= BBC Young Musician =

Biennial British televised national competition for young musicians

- Awarded for: Exceptional musical talent
- Location: Various; Bristol Beacon (2026 final)
- Country: United Kingdom
- Presented by: BBC
- Formerly called: BBC Young Musician of the Year (1978–2008)
- First award: 1978; 48 years ago
- Winner: Sofia Demetriades in 2026
- Website: BBC Young Musician website

Television/radio coverage
- Network: BBC Two, BBC Four and BBC Radio 3
- Former logo/banner used in 2004
- Related: BBC Young Composer; BBC Young Dancer; BBC Young Jazz Musician

BBC Young Musician is a televised national music competition broadcast biennially on BBC Television and BBC Radio 3. Originally BBC Young Musician of the Year, its name was changed in 2010.

The competition, a former member of the European Union of Music Competitions for Youth (EMCY), is open to UK-resident percussion, keyboard, string, brass and woodwind players, who are eighteen years of age or under on 1 January in the relevant year.

== History ==
The competition was established in 1978 by Humphrey Burton, Walter Todds and Roy Tipping, former members of the BBC Television Music Department. Michael Hext, a trombonist, was the inaugural winner. In 1994, the percussion category was added, alongside the existing keyboard, string, brass and woodwind categories. The competition has five stages: regional auditions, category auditions, category finals, semi-finals and the final. The biennial competition is managed and produced by BBC Cymru Wales.

To date, there have been 22 winners, the youngest being 12-year-old Peter Moore. In 2014, the BBC Young Musician Jazz Award was introduced; Alexander Bone, a saxophonist, was the inaugural winner.

As a result of the success of the competition, the Eurovision Young Musicians competition was initiated in 1982. The first edition was broadcast live from Manchester's Free Trade Hall. The presenter was Humphrey Burton and the producer was Roy Tipping. The winner of BBC Young Musician often went on to represent the United Kingdom in the Eurovision Young Musicians.

For the tenth edition of the competition in 1996, a series of recitals given by past finalists were broadcast on BBC Two in a late-night timeslot. The competition celebrated its 30th anniversary in May 2008 with a documentary narrated by Gethin Jones on BBC Two and with former participants speaking to 2006 winner Mark Simpson for Young Musicians Grown Old on BBC Radio 4. BBC Four's documentary BBC Young Musician: Forty Years Young was aired on 3 April 2018. To celebrate the 40th anniversary, the first BBC Young Musician Prom was held at the Royal Albert Hall and broadcast live on 15 July 2018. Presented by Clemency Burton-Hill, the concert featured performances from past winners and finalists alongside the BBC Concert Orchestra conducted by Andrew Gourlay.

The 2020 competition was affected by the COVID-19 pandemic, after proceeding as normal up to and including the filming of the semi-final. The five category finals were broadcast in May and June 2020, with broadcast of the semi-final and recording of the final postponed, at first until the autumn, and then into 2021. The Jazz Award final was broadcast as planned on 22 November 2020, having been recorded at Cadogan Hall in the absence of an audience. The grand final was recorded in April 2021 – also without an audience – and broadcast on 2 May, preceded on 30 April by the delayed broadcast of the semi-final.

The 2022 competition was deferred from spring to early autumn and was broadcast in October; the semi-final stage of the competition (introduced in 2010) was discontinued for that year. For the 2024 competition, a new format was introduced: category finals were replaced by two quarter-finals each featuring six musicians. A total of six musicians progress to the semi-final, and then three to the grand final.

=== Broadcast ===
Regional heats were televised in 1978; a round before the category final was aired until 1994, and again in 2002 and 2004. From 1978 to 1984, all programmes were broadcast on BBC One until it was moved to BBC Two in 1986; however from 2002 to 2012, the majority of the competition rounds were moved to BBC Four, with only a highlights/preview show (in 2002 and 2004) and the final aired on BBC Two. Previously, additional programmes were broadcast as part of each competition alongside coverage in some later years on BBC Radio 3.

In 2010, highlights of the new semi-final stage were also broadcast on BBC Two. In 2014, all stages of the competition moved to BBC Four, and the category finals and the grand final were broadcast on BBC Radio 3. For the 2018 competition, Radio 3 broadcast a 30-minute concert starring each competitor in the week before their category final aired. For 2024, the grand final will be broadcast on BBC Two for the first time since 2012 in the form of highlights of the concerto performances, whilst the full concert programme is to be aired on BBC Four and BBC Radio 3.

=== Hosts ===
The following have hosted stages of the competition:

==== Classical Award ====
- Humphrey Burton (1978–1992)
- Ernest Lush (1978)
- 1978 regional finals
  - Mary Marquis (Scotland)
  - Alun Williams (Wales)
  - Marian Foster (Midlands and East Anglia)
  - Margaret Percy (Northern Ireland)
  - Jeremy Carrad (South and West of England)
- Jane Glover (1986, 1988)
- J Mervyn Williams (1990)
- Edward Gregson (1990 final)
- Paul Daniel (1992 final)
- Sarah Greene (1994)
- Christopher Warren-Green (1996)
- Sarah Walker (1996)
- Stephanie Hughes (1998–2004)
- Iain Burnside (2002–2004)
- Alistair Appleton (2004)
- Howard Goodall (2006, 2010 final)
- Gethin Jones (2008)
- Aled Jones (2008)
- Nicola Loud (2008)
- Clemency Burton-Hill (2010–12, 2014 final, 2016, 2018 final)
- Josie d'Arby (2012, 2016 final, 2018, 2020, 2022 final)
- Alison Balsom (2014, 2016, 2018 final)
- Miloš Karadaglić (2014)
- Anna Lapwood (2020)
- Jess Gillam (2020 final, 2022, 2024)
- Alexis Ffrench (2022)
- Petroc Trelawny (2026)

==== Jazz Award ====
- Josie d'Arby (2014, 2016, 2018)
- Soweto Kinch (2014)
- Joe Stilgoe (2016)
- YolanDa Brown (2018, 2020, 2024)
- Jamz Supernova (2022)
- Huw Stephens (2022, 2024)

== Related awards ==
=== BBC Young Dancer ===
A competitive dance version, BBC Young Dancer, was launched in October 2014 and first awarded in May 2015.

=== BBC Young Jazz Musician ===
A separate competition for a Jazz Award was first held during the 2014 season, with the final broadcast on BBC Four in the week after the classical final. In 2016, the Jazz Award final was episode 7 of the 8-part BBC Four series, broadcast two days before the classical final. In 2018, the jazz competition had an upper age limit of 21 and the final was recorded for BBC Four in November as part of the London Jazz Festival; it was broadcast on 25 November, six months after the main final.

== Winners ==
=== Classical Award ===
Year	Name	Instrument	Place of study	Winning age	Notes	Finals venue
1978	Michael Hext	Trombone	Royal College of Music	17	Orchestra member at The Royal Opera House Covent Garden and occasional solo performances	RNCM Concert Hall, Manchester
1980	Nicholas Daniel	Oboe	Royal Academy of Music	18	International soloist and principal oboe of the Britten Sinfonia. Founder of the Britten Oboe Quartet and the Haffner Wind Ensemble. Has performed at numerous BBC Proms.	RNCM Concert Hall, Manchester
1982	Anna Markland	Piano	Chethams School, University of Oxford, Royal Academy of Music	18	Has since developed a reputation as a teacher, adjudicator and singer as Anna Crookes	Free Trade Hall, Manchester
1984	Emma Johnson	Clarinet	Sevenoaks School, Cambridge University	18	Solo clarinettist with a repertoire of over 40 concertos	Free Trade Hall, Manchester
1986	Alan Brind	Violin	Royal Academy of Music	17	Has since led the European Union Youth Orchestra and won the Young Musician of the Year award	Free Trade Hall, Manchester
1988	David Pyatt	Horn	Watford Grammar School for Boys	14	Youngest winner of the award at the time. Has performed at numerous BBC Proms. Principal at London Philharmonic Orchestra.	Free Trade Hall, Manchester
1990	Nicola Loud	Violin	Royal Academy of Music, Juilliard School	15	Has appeared in multiple British orchestras and several abroad	St David's Hall, Cardiff
1992	Freddy Kempf	Piano	St Edmund's School, Canterbury, Royal Academy of Music, London University	14	Became the youngest person at the time to win the award. Has since released numerous recital discs.	Royal Concert Hall, Glasgow
1994	Natalie Clein	Cello	Royal College of Music, Heinrich Schiff	15	Became the first British winner of the Eurovision Competition for Young Musicians. Has performed with several British orchestras.	Barbican, London
1996	Rafal Zambrzycki Payne	Violin	Yehudi Menuhin School, Royal Northern College of Music, Herbert von Karajan Centre	18	Won second prize at the Luxemburg International Violin Competition. Performed in orchestras in Europe, the United States, South Africa, The Middle East and Zimbabwe.	Symphony Hall, Birmingham
1998	Adrian Spillett	Percussion	Royal Northern College of Music	19	First percussionist to win the award. Has performed with an array of ensembles including the 4-MALITY Percussion Quartet. Principal Percussionist with the CBSO. Former Head of Percussion at Royal Birmingham Conservatoire	Waterfront Hall, Belfast
2000	Guy Johnston	Cello	Chetham's School of Music, Eastman School of Music	18	A performance at the Royal Albert Hall made him the youngest soloist to appear on the first night of The Proms.	Bridgewater Hall, Manchester
2002	Jennifer Pike	Violin	Chetham's School of Music, Guildhall School of Music & Drama	12	At the time, was the youngest ever winner of the award. Has appeared as a soloist with British orchestras and performed at other BBC events.	Barbican, London
2004	Nicola Benedetti	Violin	Yehudi Menuhin School	16	Performed with the BBC concert orchestra and recorded her debut album with Daniel Harding and the London Symphony Orchestra	Usher Hall, Edinburgh
2006	Mark Simpson	Clarinet	Royal College of Music, Oxford University, Guildhall School of Music & Drama	17	Was the Principal Clarinet of the National Youth Orchestra of Great Britain. Started studies at the Royal College of Music, but dropped out to go to the University of Oxford.	The Sage, Gateshead
2008	Peter Moore	Trombone	Chetham's School of Music	12	Youngest winner of the award. Co-principal at London Symphony Orchestra.	Wales Millennium Centre, Cardiff Bay
2010	Lara Ömeroğlu	Piano	Purcell School, Royal College of Music	16	Nowadays known by the name of Lara Melda	Wales Millennium Centre, Cardiff Bay
2012	Laura van der Heijden	Cello	Royal College of Music	15	Her debut album 1948 won the 2018 Edison Klassiek Award; the following year she won BBC Music Magazine's Newcomer of the Year Award.	The Sage, Gateshead
2014	Martin James Bartlett	Piano	Royal College of Music, Purcell School	17	He appeared in 2012 competition, at the age of 15, as a finalist in the keyboard category	Usher Hall, Edinburgh
2016	Sheku Kanneh-Mason	Cello	Royal Academy of Music, Trinity Catholic Comprehensive School	17	He holds the ABRSM Junior Scholarship to The Royal Academy of Music. Has played in the Chineke! Orchestra, as well as the JRAM Symphony Orchestra, and played chamber music with the Kanneh-Mason Piano Trio and the Ash String Trio.	Barbican, London
2018	Lauren Zhang	Piano	Birmingham Junior Conservatoire, King Edward VI High School for Girls	16	Played the fiendishly difficult Prokofiev Concerto no.2 and was commended for her 'inherent musical intelligence' and 'exceptional technical ability'. Won first prize at the 15th Ettlingen International Piano Competition in 2016. First Asian winner of the competition.	Symphony Hall, Birmingham
2020	Fang Zhang	Percussion	Chetham's School of Music	17	Member of the China Youth Percussion Orchestra and has won percussions competitions in China, New York and Tokyo.	Bridgewater Hall, Manchester
2022	Jordan Ashman	Percussion	Royal Birmingham Conservatoire	17	He has played with the National Children's Orchestra, National Youth Orchestra and the National Youth Brass Band.	Bridgewater Hall, Manchester
2024	Ryan Wang	Piano	Collingwood School, Eton College	17	His performance of Rachmaninov's Second Piano Concerto in the Final was described by judge Alexis Ffrench as "world class".	Bristol Beacon
2026	Sofia Demetriades	Violin	Junior Royal Academy of Music, Beare’s Chamber Music	18	Her accolades include first prize at the Haslemere International String Competition and the Lipinski-Wieniawski Competition. She has performed as a soloist across the UK, Europe, and Canada, playing a fine Vuillaume violin on loan from the Beare’s Cultural Trust.	Bristol Beacon

=== Jazz Award ===
Year	Name	Instrument	Place of study	Winning age	Notes	Finals venue
2014	Alexander Bone	Saxophone	Chetham's School of Music	17	Inaugural winner of the separate Jazz Award competition	Royal Welsh College of Music & Drama, Cardiff
2016	Alexandra Ridout	Trumpet	Royal Academy of Music, Purcell School	17	Her 21-year-old brother Tom was also a finalist	Royal Welsh College of Music & Drama, Cardiff
2018	Xhosa Cole	Saxophone	Holyhead School, Ladywood Community School of Music	22	Has played saxophone in the Jazzlines Ensemble, Birmingham Schools Symphony Orchestra and Midland Youth Jazz Orchestra among others. While studying in sixth form, Xhosa attended courses with the National Youth Jazz Collective and National Youth Wind Orchestra. He performs and teaches regularly around Birmingham.	Queen Elizabeth Hall, London
2020	Deschanel Gordon	Piano	Trinity Laban Conservatoire of Music and Dance	22	Has collaborated with Mercury Prize-nominated SEED Ensemble and Mark Kavuma's The Banger Factory, and also has his own trio.	Cadogan Hall, London
2022	Ewan Hastie	Double bass	Royal Conservatoire of Scotland	20	Has toured with the National Youth Jazz Orchestra of Scotland and the Sligo Jazz Festival; previously received the Mark McKergow Prize for Jazz Improvisation.	Queen Elizabeth Hall, London
2024	Ursula Harrison	Double bass	Cardiff University, Conservatorium van Amsterdam	22	Has worked with a variety of large ensembles and performed with musicians Huw Warren, Ant Law and Angharad Jenkins. Ursula's band Orbit Street was selected as a Forté Project artist for 2024 and recorded a new EP, Fores.	Queen Elizabeth Hall, London

== Past finalists ==
Key

†	Person won the competition of that year
**Bold**	Performer got through to the final
Italics	Performer was present at the semi-final stage

=== 1970s ===
==== 1978 ====
Name	Instrument/Category
Jeremy Atkin	Piano
Wissam Boustany	Flute
William Brewer	Horn
Paul Coker	Piano
**Michael Collins**	Clarinet
**Caroline Dale**	Cello
Barry Douglas	Piano
**Michael Hext**†	Trombone
**Stephen Hough**	Piano
Malcolm Martineau	Piano
David Melville	Trombone
Susie Meszaros	Viola
Lindsay Miller	Oboe
Kevin Morgan	Tuba
Rona Murray	Violin
Robin O'Neill	Bassoon
Jonathan Rees	Violin
Kenneth Rhind	Tuba
Gillian Tingay	Harp
Colin Twigg	Violin
Robin Williams	Oboe

=== 1980s ===
==== 1980 ====
Name	Instrument/Category
Niall Brown	Cello
Anna Carewe	Cello
Samuel Coles	Flute
Lorna Cook	Clarinet
**Nicholas Daniel**†	Oboe
Paul Galbraith	Guitar
John Bryan Henry	Piano
Jonathan Kowszun	Euphonium
Jacqueline Leveridge	Piano
David McClenaghan	Horn
**Clare McFarlane**	Violin
Bill Miller	Euphonium
**Ronan O'Hora**	Piano
Anthony Pike	Clarinet
Julie Price	Bassoon
Hilary Punshon	Piano
Robert Vanryne	Trumpet
**Elaine Wolff**	Cornet

==== 1982 ====
Name	Instrument/Category
Alexander Allen	Clarinet
Michael Bland	Clarinet
Sam Coles	Flute
Steven Craven	Cornet
Anthony Cross	Cornet
**Paul Galbraith**	Guitar
Richard Henry	Bass Trombone
Karen Jones	Flute
**Marie-Noelle Kendall**	Piano
James Kirby	Piano
Tasmin Little	Violin
**Anna Markland**†	Piano
Carla Marta Rodrigues	Viola
Jagdish Mistry	Violin
**Jeanette Murphy**	Horn
Jean Owen	Bassoon
Wendy Picton	Euphonium
Paul Richardson	Piano
Simon Smith	Violin
Mary Wu	Piano

==== 1984 ====
Name	Instrument/Category
Neyire Ashworth	Clarinet
**Naomi Atherton**	Horn
Brendan Ball	Trumpet
Nicola Bingham	Trumpet
Christopher Blake	Oboe
Jocelyn Boyer	Flute
Sarah Beth Briggs	Piano
Julian Cawdrey	Flute
Julian Dyson	Piano
Janice Graham	Violin
Andrew Harley	Piano
**Emma Johnson**†	Clarinet
Oren Marshall	Tuba
Robert Max	Cello
**Richard May**	Cello
**Lucy Parham**	Piano
Hannah Roberts	Cello
Ursula Smith	Cello
Julian Sperry	Flute
Louise Stopforth	Trombone
Simon Vidor	Piano
Abigail Young	Violin

==== 1986 ====
Name	Instrument/Category
**Alan Brind**†	Violin
Francesca Fraser	Recorder
Sam Haywood	Piano
**Fiona Howes**	Flute
Anthony Hughes	Piano
Boris Kucharsky	Violin
David Le Page	Violin
Jacob Lund	Tuba
**Robert Markham**	Piano
Jeremy Meehan	Bassoon
Steven Miller	Piano
Rachel Nadin	Piano
**Anthony Neal**	Trombone
Rhys Owens	Trumpet
Julian Plummer	Horn
Anna Pyne	Flute
Julian Sperry	Flute
Eva Stewart	Flute
Stephen Stewart	Trumpet
Annelies Terry	Cello
Victoria Wardman	Viola

==== 1988 ====
Name	Instrument/Category
Robert Agnew	Piano
Emily Beynon	Flute
Sarah Burnett	Bassoon
Rachel Clarke	Horn
**David Horne**	Piano
Boris Kucharsky	Violin
Jonathan Leathwood	Guitar
Ben Lees	Trumpet
Jonathan Middleton	Piano
Andrew Nicholson	Flute
Steven Osborne	Piano
Charles Owen	Piano
Craig Patterson	Trumpet
**David Pyatt**†	Horn
Katherine Spencer	Clarinet
**Jennifer Sturgeon**	Flute
Lucy Wakeford	Harp
Heather Wallington	Viola
**Paul Watkins**	Cello
David Whitehouse	Trombone

=== 1990s ===
==== 1990 ====
Name	Instrument/Category
Thomas Adès	Piano
Cathy Beynon	Harp
Ruth Bolister	Oboe
Thomas Carroll	Cello
Martyn Chambers	Trumpet
Amy Claricoates	Cello
Simon Cowen	Trombone
Gareth Davies	Flute
Martin Douglas	Tuba
Laura Jellicoe	Flute
Daniel Jemison	Bassoon
Simon Johnson	Trombone
**Nicola Loud**†	Violin
Zoe Mather	Piano
**Leon McCawley**	Piano
Richard Ormrod	Piano
**Jeremy Pooley**	Horn
**Jonathan Rimmer**	Flute
Kirsty Staines	Violin
Karen Twitchett	Piano

==== 1992 ====
Name	Instrument/Category
**Rachel Barnes**	Bassoon
**Thomas Carroll**	Cello
Elaine Clark	Violin
Simon Cowen	Trombone
James Cuddeford	Violin
Robin Haggart	Tuba
Miranda Harding	Cello
Tim Horton	Piano
**Freddy Kempf**†	Piano
Michael Lynn	Clarinet
Louise McMahon	Flute
Heather McNaughton	Horn
Helen Moody	Oboe
**Kevin Norbury**	Tuba
Jason Ridgeway	Piano
Daniel Tong	Piano
Helen Vollam	Trombone
Jamie Walton	Cello
Maxine Willis	Flute
Rebecca Wood	Oboe
Anthony Zerpa-Falcon	Piano

==== 1994 ====
Name	Instrument/Category
**Claire Allen**	Trumpet
James Arnold	Trumpet
Adrian Brendel	Cello
**Emma Bullough**	Oboe
Edward Cervenka	Percussion
**Natalie Clein**†	Cello
**Colin Currie**	Percussion
David Edmonds	Flute
Sam Elliott	Tuba
Andrea Hallam	Violin
**Stuart King**	Clarinet
Jack Liebeck	Violin
Joseph Long	Piano
Katherine Mackintosh	Oboe
Claire Madin	Piano
**Ruth McGinley**	Piano
Philip Moore	Piano
**Matthew Myatt**	Piano
Rafal Payne	Violin
Matthew Perry	Percussion
**Tracey Redfern**	Trumpet
Julie Stewart	Flute
David Thornton	Euphonium
Andrea Vogler	Percussion
Stephen Whibley	Percussion

==== 1996 ====
Name	Instrument/Category
Juliette Bausor	Flute
Edward Cervenka	Percussion
**Julien Cheriyan**	Piano
Sam Elliot	Tuba
Alison Farr	Piano
Tim Gunnell	Percussion
Richard Harpham	Oboe
James Hart	Percussion
**Ben Hudson**	Bassoon
Mark Law	Trumpet
**Rafal Zambrzycki Payne**†	Violin
**Katy Pryce**	Trombone
Sally Pryce	Harp
David Quigley	Piano
Michael Rives	Percussion
Peter Roper-Curzon	Piano
Keith Slade	Clarinet
Daniel Smith	Piano
John Storey	Euphonium
Miriam Teppich	Violin
**Sam Walton**	Percussion
Adrian Wilson	Oboe
Helena Wood	Violin
Katharine Wood	Cello
Adam Wright	Trumpet

==== 1998 ====
Name	Instrument/Category
Ron Abramski	Piano
Mark Almond	French horn
**Alison Balsom**	Trumpet
John Barker	Saxophone
**Juliette Bausor**	Flute
Emma Brodie	Percussion
Katherine Bryan	Flute
Calum Cook	Cello
Andrew Cottee	Percussion
Sam Elliott	Tuba
Benjamin Errington	Viola
**Alison Farr**	Piano
Tim Gibbs	Double bass
Charys Green	Clarinet
Nicholas Hagon	Piano
David Hilton	Trumpet
Magnus Johnston	Violin
Niall Keatley	Trumpet
**Marie Macleod**	Cello
Magnus Mehta	Percussion
Troy Miller	Percussion
Helen Reid	Piano
**Adrian Spillett**†	Percussion
Nathan Williamson	Piano
Adrian Wilsom	Oboe

=== 2000s ===
==== 2000 ====
Name	Instrument/Category
Angela Barnes	French horn
Katherine Bryan	Flute
**David Childs**	Euphonium
Simon Cosgrove	Saxophone
**Elizabeth Couling**	Oboe
Keith Forster	Percussion
Scott Foster	Percussion
Ashley Grote	Organ
**Owen Gunnell**	Percussion
Tom Hunter	Percussion
**Guy Johnston**†	Cello
Edward Jones	Trombone
Samantha Kerby	Recorder
Jack Liebeck	Violin
Katie Lockhart	Clarinet
Leo McFall	Piano
Kodo Osada	Piano
Christopher Parkes	French horn
**Tom Poster**	Piano
Nicholas Rimmer	Piano
Matthew Sadler	Trumpet
Rakhi Singh	Violin
Alexander Sitkovetsky	Violin
Helena Smart	Violin
Oliver Yates	Percussion

==== 2002 ====
Name	Instrument/Category
Henry Baldwin	Percussion
**Angela Barnes**	Horn
Katherine Bryan	Flute
**Benjamin Bryant**	Percussion
Stephen Burke	Percussion
Rowena Calvert	Cello
George Corbett	Cello
Simon Cosgrove	Saxophone
Colin Davis	Piano
Scott Foster	Percussion
Matthew Gee	Trombone
Emma Hancock	Violin
Edward Jones	Trombone
Patrick King	Percussion
Laura Lucas	Flute
Michael McHale	Piano
Leslie Neish	Tuba
Timothy Orpen	Clarinet
Thomas Osborne	Trumpet
**Jennifer Pike**†	Violin
Robert Scamardella	Piano
Andrew Shirtliff	Piano
**Sarah Tandy**	Piano
Litsa Tunnah	Violin
**Sarah Williamson**	Clarinet

==== 2004 ====
Finals for the 2004 competition took place on 2 May at the Usher Hall, Edinburgh and were televised on BBC Two. The trophy used for this year's competition was designed by John Rocha at Waterford Crystal. (Note: Extended information used where available.)

Name	Instrument/Category
Otis Beasley	Keyboard
**Lucy Beeson**	Percussion
**Nicola Benedetti**†	Violin
Elizabeth Chell	Horn
Sijie Chen	Violin
Adam Clifford	Percussion
Andrea Crossley	Percussion
Michal Cwizewicz	Violin
Elizabath Drury	Saxophone
Richard Elsworth	Percussion
Ashley Fripp	Keyboard
Christopher Gomersall	Trombone
**Benjamin Grosvenor**	Keyboard
**Daniel De Gruchy-Lambert**	Trumpet
Eddy Hackett	Percussion
Clare Hammond	Keyboard
Toni James	Keyboard
Catriona Mackinnon	Oboe
Christopher Pannell	Tenor horn
Paul Skinner	Flute
Peter Smith	Tuba
Ellen Hydref Thomas	Harp
Suzanne Thorn	Oboe
Tamsin Waley-Cohen	Violin
**Adam Walker**	Flute

==== 2006 ====
The 2006 finals were held at The Sage Gateshead on 20 May 2006. The adjudicators for this competition were Marin Alsop, Carlos Bonell, Peter Sadlo, Thea King, Sergei Nakariakov, Angela Hewitt and Kathryn McDowell.

Name	Instrument	Performance	Notes
Toby Kearney	Percussion	Veni, Veni, Emmanuel (MacMillan)	Now a member of the Royal Northern College of Music, his childhood environment encouraged him to be involved in music
David Massey	Guitar	Fantasia para un Gentilhombre	Began guitar lesson at eight years old at the Mid Herts Music Centre, with current aspirations for a career involving music; is currently studying at the Royal Academy of Music, London
Huw Morgan	Trumpet	Trumpet Concerto (Tomasi)	Principal trumpet of the National Youth Orchestra, began learning piano and other instruments at five years of age
**Mark Simpson**†	Clarinet	Clarinet Concerto (Nielsen)	Winner of the 2006 competition, originally played the keyboard and recorder
Cordelia Williams	Piano	Saint-Saens Piano Concerto No. 2	Studied at Chetham's school for 7 years, and is currently studying at the Guildhall School in London.

The semi-finalists that did not progress were, by category:

- Keyboard: Lydia Scadding, Kausikan Rajeshkumar, Melissa Gore and David Secchi
- Percussion: Katy Hebditch, Oliver Lowe, David Elliott and Daniel Jones
- Woodwind: Suzanne Thorn (oboe),Helen Wilson (flute), Emily Ross (oboe) and Harry Winstanley (flute)
- Brass: Stephen Sykes (trombone), Sasha Koushk-Jalali (tuba), Aledander Edmundson (French Horn) and Ryan Gray (euphonium)
- Strings: Meherban Gillett (double bass), Victoria Goldsmith (violin), Sarah Oliver (cello) and Sophie Rosa (violin)

==== 2008 ====
The 2008 finals took place at the Wales Millennium Centre in Cardiff on 10 and 11 May 2008. In celebration of thirty years of the competition broadcasting, the performances lasted for two days.

Name	Hometown	Instrument	Notes
Anke Batty	Lyndhurst, Hampshire	Clarinet	Achieved Grade 8 distinction in Singing, Piano and Saxophone as well as playing the clarinet
Daniel Day	Hayfield	Percussion	Began playing percussion at the age of three after his father, a professional drummer bought him a drum set; currently studies at the Chetham's School of Music
**Jadran Duncumb**	Ski, Norway	Guitar	Two time winner of the Norwegian National Youth competition; began playing the Guitar at the age of ten
Alexander Edmundson	Lytham St Annes	French Horn	Began playing the French Horn at seven years of age after hearing Mozart's Horn Concert No 4.; he studies at Chetham's School of Music and is a member of the National Youth Orchestra of Great Britain
David Elliott	Bournemouth	Percussion	Began playing percussion at the age of three, and currently studies at the Trinity College of Music after studying at Chetham's School of Music for three years; he held the position of Co Principal in the National Youth Orchestra of Great Britain percussion section
Michael Foyle	Troon	Piano	Began playing piano at the age of six, and is also a violinist, he has led the National Children's Orchestra of Scotland and the National Youth Orchestra of Great Britain; currently studying at Wellington School
Sam Law	Ballymena	Piano	Began playing piano at the age of six, and now studies at the Ballymena Academy and at the Royal Irish Academy of Music in Dublin
Henry Lindsay	Amersham	Tuba	Currently studying at The Purcell School of Music, the Junior Department of the Royal Academy of Music and is a member of the National Youth Orchestra of Great Britain
Cecilia Sultana De Maria	Warminster	Harp	Began playing the Harp at the age of ten while also playing the Piano and Violin, currently studies at the Junior Department of the Royal College of Music
**Erdem Misirlioğlu**	Ipswich	Piano	Studying at the Northgate High School in Ipswich and the Junior Department at the Guildhall School of Music and Drama
**Jim Molyneux**	Littleborough, Greater Manchester	Percussion	Started playing percussion at the age of seven and is studying at the Chetham's School of Music
**Peter Moore**†	Stalybridge	Trombone	Started to play the trombone at the age of six. Held the position of Principal Trombone of the National Children's Band of Great Britain; he is the youngest musician in this year's competition
Kausikan Rajeshkumar	Harrow, London	Piano	Began playing the piano at seven years of age, and currently Studies at The Purcell School of Music; he has received awards for composing, such as Highly Commended at BBC Proms Composers' Competition 2006
Katherine Robb	Bushey	Violin	Started playing the Violin at eight after being offered free lessons in her school in Essex; she later became a student at The Purcell School of Music, and was the first violinist in the National Youth Orchestra for 2 years
Melanie Rothman	Carshalton	Oboe	Began playing the Oboe at the age of ten, and is studying at The Purcell School of Music, but also studies at the Junior Department of the Royal Academy of Music and is Principal Oboe of the National Youth Orchestra of Great Britain after joining just one year previously
Jun Sasaki	London	Cello	Began playing the Violin at the age of four, but switched to the Cello at five; he currently studies at Yehudi Menuhin School
Joseph Shiner	East Brent, Somerset	Clarinet	Began playing the Clarinet at eight years of age; he has since achieved Principal Clarinet of the National Youth Orchestra of Great Britain after two years of membership
**David Smith**	Fife	Flute	Began playing the Flute in 2004, his influence being when he heard Prelude to the Afternoon of a Faun; he studied at St Mary's Music School in Edinburgh until 2008. He also plays the Saxophone very well
Delia Stevens	Normanton on Soar	Percussion	Studies at Loughborough High School and was influenced to play percussion after seeing the school orchestra performance
Matthew White	Bolton	Euphonium	Studies at Chetham's School of Music, and was Principal Euphonium with the National Youth Brass Band of Great Britain

=== 2010s ===
==== 2010 ====
Name	Instrument/Category
Finlay Bain	French Horn
Frederic Bager	Piano
Tom Berry	Trombone
Glain Dafydd	Harp
Anne Denholm	Harp
Sophie Dee	Piano
Anna Douglass	French Horn
Chloé Greenwood	Oboe
**Emma Halnan**	Flute
Alex Hamilton	French Horn
John Hewitt-Jones	Viola
Lucy Landymore	Percussion
James Larter	Percussion
Sam Moffitt	Trumpet
HuiWai Nok	Percussion
Joe Norris	Clarinet
**Lara Ömeroğlu**†	Piano
Oliver Pooley	Percussion
Lavinia Redman	Oboe
Seán Morgan-Rooney	Piano
Katy Smith	Violin
**Callum Smart**	Violin
Delia Stevens	Percussion
Ben Westlake	Clarinet
Yuanfan Yang	Piano

==== 2012 ====
Name	Instrument/Category
Adam Boeker	Piano
Alexander Kelly	Bass Trombone
**Charlotte Barbour-Condini**	Recorder
Charlotte Cox	Bassoon
Christopher Dunn	Tuba
Cristian Grajner-De-Sa	Violin
Dominic Degavino	Piano
Elizabeth Tocknell	French Horn
Elzbieta Young	Trumpet
Hyun-gi Lee	Percussion
James Larter	Percussion
Joel Sandelson	Cello
Jonathan Bates	E flat Tenor Horn
Jordan Black	Clarinet
Julia Hwang	Violin
Juliette Roos	Violin
**Laura Van Der Heijden**†	Cello
Lucinda Dunne	Saxophone
Luke O'Toole	Flute
Martin James Bartlett	Piano
Molly Lopresti	Percussion
Peter Rayner	Percussion
Richard Rayner	Percussion
Victor Lim	Piano
**Yuanfan Yang**	Piano

==== 2014 ====
===== Classical Award =====
Name	Instrument/Category
Daniel Shao	Flute
Dogyung Anna Im	Violin
Elizaveta Tyun	Violin
Ellena Newton	Trombone
**Elliott Gaston-Ross**	Percussion
Hannah Foster	Flute
Hayley Parkes	Piano
Isata Kanneh-Mason	Piano
Isobel Daws	Trombone
Jess Gillam	Saxophone
Jess Wood	Percussion
Julian Trevelyan	Piano
Juliana Myslov	Harp
Lewis Bettles	Trombone
**Martin James Bartlett**†	Piano
Matilda Lloyd	Trumpet
Matthew Farthing	Percussion
Nick Seymour	Saxophone
Ning Hui See	Keyboard
Roberto Ruisi	Violin
**Sophie Westbrooke**	Recorder
Stefan Beckett	Percussion
Tom Highnam	Percussion
Will Thomas	Trumpet/Flugelhorn
William Dutton	Violin

===== Jazz Award =====
Name	Instrument/Category
**Alexander Bone**†	Saxophone
Freddie Jensen	Double bass
Jake Labazzi	Trumpet
Sean Payne	Saxophone
Tom Smith	Saxophone

==== 2016 ====
===== Classical Award =====
Name	Instrument/Category
Andrew Woolcock	Percussion
**Ben Goldscheider**	Horn
Charlie Lovell-Jones	Violin
Gemma Riley	Trombone
Harvey Lin	Piano
Hristiyan Hristov	Percussion
Jackie Campbell	Piano
**Jess Gillam**	Saxophone
Joanne Lee	Flute
Joe Parks	Percussion
Joe Pritchard	Cello
Julian Trevelyan	Piano
Louisa Staples	Violin
Lucy Driver	Flute
Marie Sato	Flute
Matthew Brett	Percussion
Polly Bartlett	Recorder
Sam Dye	Trombone
**Sheku Kanneh-Mason**†	Cello
Stephanie Childress	Violin
Tom Pritchard	Percussion
Tomoka Kan	Piano
Yuanfan Yang	Piano
Zak Eastop	Trumpet
Zoe Perkins	Trumpet

===== Jazz Award =====
Name	Instrument/Category
**Alexandra Ridout**†	Trumpet
Tom Ridout	Saxophone and Recorder
Tom Smith	Saxophone
Noah Stoneman	Piano
Elliott Sansom	Piano

==== 2018 ====
===== Classical Award =====
The 2018 finals were held at the Symphony Hall, Birmingham, on 13 May 2018. The judges were Kerry Andrew (chair), Alpesh Chauhan, Natalie Clein, John Harle and Sunwook Kim.

Name	Instrument/Category
Adam Heron	Keyboard
Alexander Pullen	Percussion
Annemarie Federle	French Horn/Brass
Elias Ackerley	Keyboard
Eliza Haskins	Recorder/Woodwind
Elodie Chousmer-Howelles	Violin/Strings
Francis Bushell	Bassoon/Woodwind
Isobel Daws	Trombone/Brass
Jeneba Kanneh-Mason	Keyboard
**Lauren Zhang**†	Keyboard
Mariam Loladze-Meredith	Keyboard
Marie Sato	Flute/Woodwind
Matthew Brett	Percussion
**Maxim Calver**	Cello/Strings
Meadow Brooks	Percussion
Michaias Berlouis	Bass Trombone/Brass
**Robert Burton**	Saxophone/Woodwind
Sam Dye	Trombone/Brass
Stephanie Childress	Violin/Strings
Tom Hall	Percussion
Tom Myles	Clarinet/Woodwind
Toril Azzalini-Machecler	Percussion
Torrin Williams	Guitar/Strings
Will Duerden	Double Bass/Strings
Will Thomas	Trumpet+Flugelhorn/Brass

===== Jazz Award =====
Name	Instrument/Category
**Xhosa Cole**†	Saxophone
Reuben Goldmark	Piano
Fergus McCreadie	Piano
James Owston	Bass
Seth Tackaberry	Bass

=== 2020s ===
==== 2020–21 ====
===== Classical Award =====
Name	Instrument/Category
Alexander Pullen	Percussion
Alice Gore	Woodwind – Bassoon
**Annemarie Federle**	Brass – French Horn
Bridget Yee	Keyboard
Coco Tomita	Strings – Violin
Daisy Noton	Woodwind – Flute
Eliza Haskins	Woodwind – Recorder
Ellen Baumring-Gledhill	Strings – Cello
**Ewan Millar**	Woodwind – Oboe
**Fang Zhang**†	Percussion
Harvey Lin	Keyboard
Huw Boucher	Strings – Harp
Ilai Avni	Strings – Violin
Isaac Harari	Percussion
Jacky Zhang	Keyboard
Joseph Longstaff	Brass – French Horn
Lewis Kentaro Isaacs	Percussion
Marian Bozhidarov	Woodwind – Clarinet
Meggie Murphy	Brass – Trombone
Mio Takahashi	Strings – Violin
Rhydian Tiddy	Brass – Trombone
Sejin Yoon	Keyboard
Thomas Luke	Keyboard
Toril Azzalini-Machecler	Percussion
William Burton	Brass – Tuba

===== Jazz Award =====
Name	Instrument/Category
**Deschanel Gordon**†	Piano
Alex Clarke	Saxophone
Kielan Sheard	Bass
Matt Carmichael	Saxophone
Ralph Porrett	Guitar

==== 2022 ====
===== Classical Award =====
Name	Instrument/Category
Aki Blendis	Strings - Violin
Alex Buckley	Woodwind - Clarinet
Clara-Sophia Wernig	Strings - Violin
Daniel Hibbert	Brass - French Horn
Dawid Kasprzak	Strings - Violin
Dida Condria	Keyboard
Duru Erdogan	Keyboard
Edward Walton	Strings - Violin
Eric Zhang	Percussion
**Ethan Loch**	Keyboard
Firoze Madon	Keyboard
Florence Wilson-Toy	Brass - Trumpet
George Garnett	Percussion
Imogen Moorsom	Brass - French Horn
Isaac Skey	Woodwind - Flute
Jacky Zhang	Keyboard
**Jaren Ziegler**	Strings - Viola
**Jordan Ashman**†	Percussion
Joshua Gearing	Percussion
Lucas Dick	Woodwind - Clarinet
Phoebe Mallinson	Brass - Trumpet
**Sasha Canter**	Brass - Trumpet
**Sofía Patterson-Gutiérrez**	Woodwind - Flute
Sophie Warner	Percussion
Thomas Priestley	Woodwind - Saxophone

===== Jazz Award =====
Name	Instrument/Category
**Ewan Hastie**†	Double bass
Luke Bacchus	Piano
Nick Manz	Piano
Ralph Porrett	Guitar
Emma Rawicz	Saxophone

==== 2024 ====
===== Classical Award =====
Judging every televised round of this year's competition were trumpeter Alison Balsom, pianist and composer Alexis Ffrench, and multi-instrumentalist and broadcaster Hannah Catherine Jones. The two quarter finals were won by Jamaal Kashim and Shlomi Shahaf respectively, with Hugo Svedberg, Jacky Zhang and Ryan Wang advancing to the semi-final as "wildcards". Zhang, Wang and Shahaf were announced as the finalists.

Name	Category	Instrument
Alasdair Cottee	Woodwind	Oboe
Alicia Li-Yan-Hui	Woodwind	Clarinet
Defne Anar	Strings	Harp
Finn Anderson-Hendra	Strings	Cello
Hugo Svedberg	Strings	Cello
**Jacky Zhang**	Keyboard	Piano
Jamaal Kashim	Strings	Harp
Kaelyn Soh	Strings	Violin
Maya Broman Crawford-Phillips	Strings	Violin
Rose Gosney	Strings	Violin
**Ryan Wang**†	Keyboard	Piano
**Shlomi Shahaf**	Strings	Violin

===== Jazz Award =====
Name	Instrument/Category
Klara Devlin	Trumpet
**Ursula Harrison**†	Double bass
George Johnson	Saxophone
Nils Kavanagh	Piano

==== 2026 ====
===== Classical Award =====
- Jury: Joanna MacGregor and conductor Ben Gernon appeared on the judging panel throughout the competition and were joined by Peter Moore (live auditions), Julian Bliss (quarter-final), Jennifer Pike (semi-final) and Errollyn Wallen (final)

Name	Category	Instrument
**Alma Nunez Debretzeni**	Woodwind	Recorder
Anna Richmond	Percussion	
George Brady	Brass	French Horn
Julia Majewska	Strings	Violin
**Kezia Colton**	Woodwind	Saxophone
Oliver Hak	Keyboard	Piano
**Sofia Demetriades**†	Strings	Violin
Sylvester Maschi	Keyboard	Accordion
