= National Children's Orchestra of Great Britain =

UK's leading orchestra for children

The National Children's Orchestras of Great Britain, more commonly known as NCO, is a registered charity, and the UK’s leading orchestra for children, recognised for its rigorous auditions and national performances by children aged 8 to 14. It is the only national level organisation that caters for orchestral players of this age group in the UK. The organisation comprises three age-banded national orchestras and four project orchestras. Entry to these orchestras is by audition. In 2025, 1,068 young musicians applied for Orchestral Weeks (formerly known as National Orchestras) and Orchestral Weekends (formerly known as Project Orchestras) with 319 receiving spots in one of the Orchestral Weeks, with an additional 345 musicians gaining a place in one of the Orchestral Weekends. Furthermore, there is a non-auditioned Orchestral Days programme (formerly known as the Horizons Programme) that engages with 4-16 year olds and provides them with free, open music opportunities. NCO offers a life-changing experience to talented young musicians across the country. 2,240 children engaged with NCO activities in 2025, a 37% increase compared with 2024.

== The history of NCO ==
The NCO was founded in 1978 by Vivienne Price MBE. Price, a violin teacher, had set up a number of local orchestras for children in Surrey but was acutely aware of the lack of national opportunities for younger musicians. The National Youth Orchestra of Great Britain had existed since 1948 and there were many regional youth orchestras which catered for teenagers, but younger children struggled to fit in socially and so Price established the NCO.

== Orchestral Weeks ==
There are three age-banded auditioned national orchestras:

- Under 14 Orchestra
- Under 13 Orchestra
- Under 12 Orchestra

Prior to 2026, the Under 14 Orchestra was known as the Main Orchestra.

Prior to 2026, Orchestral Weeks were called the National Orchestras.

Each national orchestra meets twice a year at residential courses around the UK, where they receive training from leading music tutors and conductors. Under 14 and Under 13 Orchestras have an eight-day course in the spring and another eight-day course in the summer, both ending in a public concert in a major venue, as well as a non-residential winter weekend for the Under 14 orchestra. The Under 12 Orchestra has two 7-day courses a year with one private concert and one public concert after the second course. The courses are spent in sectionals and full orchestral rehearsals, preparing repertoire to be played at the end of course concert. Time is allocated for recreation and wellbeing sessions organised by the wellbeing lead. Each morning there is also a 'Thought for the Day' given by a Music Tutor, a member of Support Staff, Admin Team, the Wellbeing Lead, Creative Lead or a guest visitor.

Furthermore, a creative programme called 'Surround Sound' is where each National Orchestra is split into 14 groups, consisting of a mix of instruments across the orchestra. Each group of young musicians compose their own piece, typically over three hour-long sessions, based on an allocated prompt within an overarching theme. At the culmination of these sessions, the entire orchestra comes together for a 'Surround Sound Sharing'. Each group performs their composition in front of the entire orchestra and the creative lead for the course ties together these individual compositions into one cohesive story.

== Orchestral Weekends ==
In addition to the age-banded orchestras, there are four auditioned project orchestras that meet around the country for 2 weekends per year. These take place in the North West, the Midlands and at two venues in London. Certain programmes include special guest artists, including Jess Gillam, Sheku Kanneh-Mason, Simmy Singh and Nate Holder. Parts are often designed especially for the projects orchestras to ensure that everyone participating has a suitable part, appropriate for their level.

Orchestral Weekends rehearsals are for a more inclusive age and standard bracket with guidance of at least Grade 3 standard. Typically the Orchestral Weekends use schools or universities such as Goldsmith University and hold a sharing concert at the end of the course. The project orchestras, now renamed the Orchestral Weekends, were introduced as something similar to the Regional orchestras after they were cut.

The regional orchestras were for national members and regional-only members and took place in six locations across the country on Sundays. In 2012, the organisation introduced an associate member scheme across all of their Regional Orchestras which gives talented youngsters who just missed out on an NCO place a chance to experience playing as part of a full symphony orchestra and to learn from members. Regional Orchestra members met monthly during term time and give members additional opportunities to meet and rehearse new repertoire. Typically, each Regional Orchestra rehearsed at a school or centre which is easily accessible and can provide facilities to accommodate a full symphony orchestra. Each Regional Orchestra performed for family and friends once a year.

Prior to 2026, Orchestral Weekends were known as Project Orchestras.

== Concerts ==
The national orchestras give six public concerts each year at major concert venues. The Under 13 and Main Orchestras perform public concerts at the conclusion of their Spring and Summer Residentials, while the Under 12 Orchestra only holds a public concert at the end of its Summer Residential. In addition, the Main Orchestra performs a public concert at the end of its Winter Weekend. Performances have been given at Symphony Hall, Birmingham, Royal Albert Hall, Bridgewater Hall, Southbank Centre, The Sage Gateshead, Colston Hall, St David's Hall, Leeds Town Hall, Birmingham Town Hall, The Anvil, Basingstoke, Brighton Dome, Barbican Centre, the Bristol Beacon and Nottingham Royal Concert Hall.

In addition, there are nine family sharing concerts each year: two by each Orchestral Weekend and one by the Under 12 Orchestra at the conclusion of their Spring Residential.

Concert programmes are varied and includes Classical, Romantic, 20th and 21st century music, as well as film scores. The NCO has commissioned, premiered and played new pieces by contemporary composers such as Matthew Curtis, Rachel Portman, Debbie Wiseman and Kristina Arakelyan. The Orchestras have a reputation for tackling challenging repertoire. As of 2025, recent performances have included Mussorgsky’s Pictures at an Exhibition (orchestrated by Ravel) and Britten’s The Young Person’s Guide to the Orchestra (Spring 2025, Basingstoke), Shostakovich’s Symphony No. 5 (Winter 2024, Woolwich Works), Stravinsky’s Firebird Suite (1919 version, Summer 2025, Manchester), Rimsky-Korsakov’s Scheherazade (Summer 2025, Portsmouth), Walton’s Henry V and Howard Shore’s The Fellowship of the Ring Symphonic Suite (Summer 2025, Bristol).

In 2026, NCO will be performing at venues including Bristol Beacon, Liverpool Philharmonic Hall and Wiltshire Music Centre. Highlights include, the Under 14 Orchestra’s Cosmic programme, featuring Strauss’s Also sprach Zarathustra and Holst’s The Planets, performed with organist Anna Lapwood, an NCO alumna. Other major programmes across the season includes Gershwin’s An American in Paris, Bernstein’s West Side Story, Copland’s Rodeo and Sibelius’ Finlandia, alongside a range of film and contemporary works.

In 2025, over 4,500 people attended NCO's concerts.

== Non-Auditioned Programmes ==
The Non-Auditioned Programme grants young people access to high-level music making that may not be able to do otherwise. This includes Orchestral Days, side-by-side performances with NCO Orchestras, school performances by music tutors, workshops and free first experience tickets to an NCO public concert. In 2025, non-auditioned activity reached 1,293 children.

NCO also partners with Bristol Beacon, Cathedral Schools Trust and Oak National Academy, who are writing a new primary music curriculum for thousands of children across the country. The 2025 National Main Orchestra were filmed and interviewed during their Spring Residential to provide content for Oak National Academy. This was published in November 2025.

Prior to 2026, Orchestral Days were known as Horizon Programme.

== Tours ==
The NCO has been on tour, to Italy in 2008 when Lady Susanna Walton (widow of Sir William Walton) invited the Main Orchestra to play in the Walton's open-air theatre within the botanical gardens of La Mortella on the island of Ischia. They also played a concert to a packed audience in the Basilica di Santa Maria sopra Minerva in Rome.

In 2006 Main Orchestra toured to China where they took part in the International Festival of Music in Beijing. They performed in the Forbidden City Concert Hall and at the University of Beijing.

== Alumni ==
After leaving the NCO many musicians continue to pursue other musical opportunities. Typically, close to half of the NYO players have previously been members of the NCO (73 out of 162 in the Orchestra of 2025 and 51 out of 158 in the Orchestra of 2026). The BBC Young Musician of the Year 2024 competition featured 12 category finalists, 7 of whom had progressed through the NCO.

Many alumni become professional musicians, some playing for leading orchestras and ensembles. As well as those who build successful careers as professional musicians, many other NCO alumni go on to excel in other fields – medicine, law and engineering, among others.

=== Notable alumni ===
Name	Instrument/Profession	NCO membership
Janice Graham	Violinist	1980-2
Daniel Harding	Conductor	1988
Guy Johnston	Cellist	1992-5
Robin Ticciati	Conductor	1992-5
Nicola Benedetti	Violinist	1995-8
Katherine Bryan	Flautist	1994-5
Martin James Bartlett	Pianist	2007-9
Anna Lapwood	Harpist	

== Governance and leadership ==
The National Children’s Orchestras of Great Britain (NCO) operates as a registered charity (Charity No. 803026) overseen by a board of trustees. The board is chaired by the newly appointed Michael Eakin who has been in post since February 2026, providing strategic direction alongside the other trustees.

Day-to-day management is led by the Chief Executive, Sophie Lewis, who has been in post since 2018.

From 2017 until spring 2025, the Artistic and Education Director was Catherine Arlidge MBE, who shaped repertoire and educational strategy before stepping down to take up a senior role with the City of Birmingham Symphony Orchestra.

== See also ==
- List of youth orchestras
