= Loch (surname) =

Loch is the surname of a Scottish Lowlands family whose members have included:

- George Loch of Drylaw (1749-1788), Edinburgh land-owner
- James Loch (1780–1855), Scottish estate commissioner and later a Member of Parliament
- John Loch (1781–1868), Chairman of the East India Company
- George Loch (1811–1887), Member of Parliament
- Henry Loch, 1st Baron Loch (1827–1900), Scottish soldier and colonial administrator
- Edward Loch, 2nd Baron Loch (1873–1942), senior British Army officer
- Joice NanKivell Loch (1887–1982), Australian author, journalist and humanitarian
- Kenneth Loch (1890–1961), Lieutenant-General, a Scottish soldier and defence planner
- Tam Dalyell, born Thomas Dalyell Loch, a Scottish politician; Labour Member of Parliament from 1962 to 2005
- Gordon Dalyell of the Binns, father to Tam Dalyell, and born Percy Gordon Loch, the son of Lt Col William Loch

Loch is also a German surname:

- Birgit Loch, German-Australian mathematician and academic administrator
- Christoph Loch, Director (Dean) of Cambridge Judge Business School at the University of Cambridge
- Felix Loch (born 1989), German luger and Olympic champion
- Hans Loch (1898-1960), East German politician
- Herbert Loch (1886–1976), German general during World War II

Other people with the surname Loch include:

- Samuel Loch (born 1983), Australian rower
- Ethan Loch (born 2004), Scottish pianist

== See also ==
- Lough (surname)

Loch Sylvia www.sylvialoch.com equestrian author
