= DeLoache =

DeLoache is a surname. Notable people with the surname include:

- Ira P. DeLoache (1879–1965), American real estate developer
- Rachel DeLoache Williams (born 1988), American author and editor

== See also ==
- Deloche (disambiguation)
