= Oliver Lewis (violinist) =

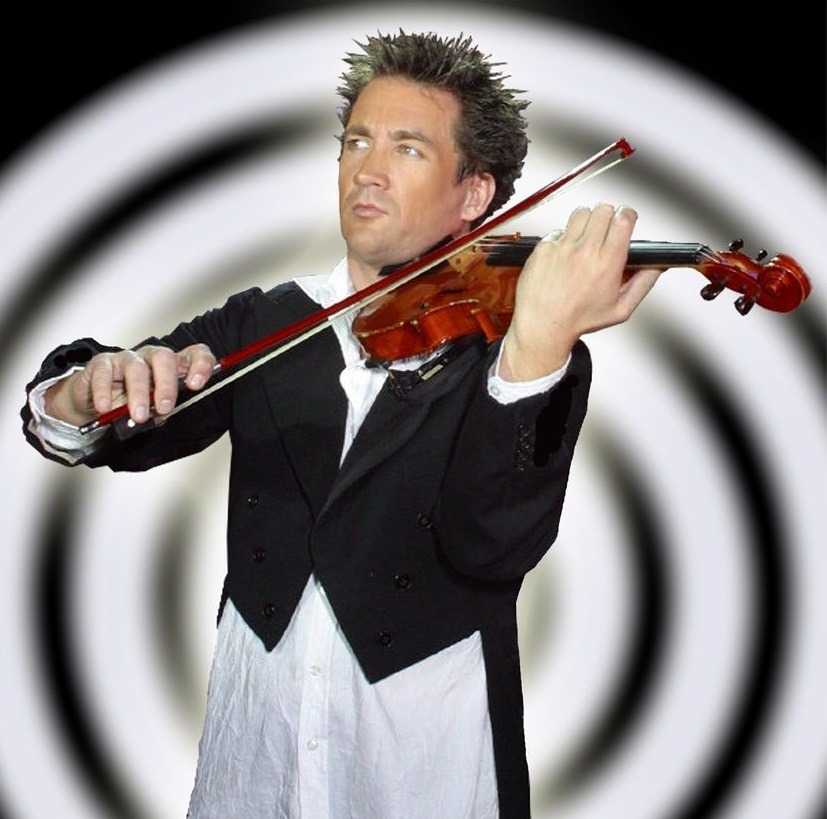
- Oliver Lewis performing in 2010

Background information
- Born: Oliver Lewis; 12 May 1971 (age 55); London, England
- Genres: Classical, Electronic, Pop
- Occupations: Violinist, actor
- Years active: 1996–present
- Label: Guild Music
- Website: www.oliverlewis.co.uk

Oliver Lewis (born 12 May 1971) is a British violinist and founder member of the electronic music group Deviations Project. He is best known as one of the 'world's fastest violinists', having broken the Guinness World Record for the fastest performance of the Flight of the Bumblebee. Lewis played the piece during a live broadcast on the BBC children's television programme Blue Peter, in October 2010, in one minute, 3.356 seconds. Lewis seemingly broke the world record again in February 2011, on the US chat show, The Ellen DeGeneres Show. His unofficial time of 47 seconds is yet to be certified by Guinness World Records.

== Early life ==
Lewis was born in London, England. He began playing violin as an eight-year-old, having fallen in love with the sound of the first record he had heard; Paganini Caprices, played by Ruggiero Ricci. At 12 years old, Lewis led the National Children's Orchestra of Great Britain. Lewis studied at the Purcell School and the Guildhall School of Music, London, and graduated from the Berne Conservatoire, Switzerland.

== Career ==
His professional career as a concert soloist began with the Bern Symphony Orchestra, before he joined the Heidelberg Chamber Orchestra.

Lewis created the electronic music group Deviations Project, with producer Dave Williams, in 2007. The group blends elements of classical and electronic music, on pieces such as Tchaikovsky’s Swan Lake and Bizet's Carmen, which are recreated using modern music technology. They have released three albums: the eponymous Deviations Project (2007); The Ivory Bow (2008); and their Christmas 2008 album, Adeste Fiddles, which reached number 16 in the US Billboard Classical Crossover Albums Chart.

He has featured in film and commercials; starring as the violinist in the car manufacturer Opel's Astra campaign; as the concert violinist in Marks & Spencer Christmas advertisements; and he recorded music for, and featured in, the 2004 British drama film written and directed by Charles Dance, Ladies in Lavender.

Stage productions in which Lewis has appeared include the West End musical Oliver! and a European tour with War of the Worlds. The show Spirit of the Dance brought Lewis' fame for fast violin playing to the fore. Playing the role of a crazy fiddler onstage, Lewis performed Rimsky-Korsakov's Flight of the Bumblebee; an orchestral interlude written for the opera The Tale of Tsar Saltan. Over the course of the show's world tour, Lewis performed the tune around 1,500 times.

Appearing on a live broadcast of the BBC children's television programme Blue Peter, on 18 October 2010, Lewis broke the Guinness World Record for the fastest performance of the Flight of the Bumblebee – previously held by David Garrett – playing the piece in one minute, 3.356 seconds, to become the 'world's fastest violinist'. Further television performances by Lewis of the Flight of the Bumblebee include ITV’s This Morning, for presenters Phillip Schofield and Holly Willoughby, on 29 October 2010. As a guest on the US chat show, The Ellen DeGeneres Show, Lewis broke the world record again on 3 February 2011. He played the Flight of the Bumblebee in an unofficial time of 47 seconds, which has yet to be certified by Guinness World Records.

== Personal life ==
Lewis' fingers are insured for US$1 million; $100,000 per finger. Insurance premium for the cover is $3,500 per month.
