= Alex Bone =

Alex Bone may refer to:

- Alex Bone (footballer), a Scottish retired footballer
- Alex Bone (musician), a British saxophonist, record producer and composer
