= Loch (disambiguation) =

Loch is the Scottish Gaelic and Irish word for a lake or a sea inlet.

Loch may also refer to:

== Places ==
- Loch, Victoria, a town in Australia
  - Loch railway station
- Lochs, Outer Hebrides, a parish on the Isle of Lewis, Scotland
- Lochans, Dumfries and Galloway, Scotland
- Loch Castle (Eichhofen), a rare example of a Bavarian cave castle
- Mount Loch, a mountain in Australia
- The Loch (Central Park) in Manhattan, New York, United States
- Loch Fyne (Greenland), a fjord in East Greenland

== Fiction and folklore ==
- Loch Ness Monster or "Nessie", a supposed aquatic being in Scottish folklore, which reputedly inhabits Loch Ness
- The Loch (novel), a novel by Steve Alten
- The Loch (TV series), a British TV series

== Other uses ==
- Loch (surname)
- Baron Loch, a title in the Peerage of the United Kingdom
- Loch-class frigate, a class of ship built for the Royal Navy and her allies during World War II

== See also ==
- Deloche (disambiguation)
- Loches, a commune in central France
- Loché, an associated commune of Mâcon, France
- Loche (disambiguation)
- List of lochs of Scotland
- Lochia, the vaginal discharge after giving birth
- Lough (disambiguation)
