= Alexandra Ridout =

British jazz trumpeter (born 1998)

- Born: November 1998 (age 27); Aylesbury, England
- Genres: Jazz, classical
- Occupation: Jazz musician
- Instruments: Trumpet, flugelhorn

Alexandra Ridout (born 1998) is an English jazz trumpeter. She is known for winning the BBC Young Musician Jazz Award 2016.

== Early life ==
Ridout began playing the trumpet at the age of nine after also learning guitar, recorder, and piano. She studied at The Purcell School for Young Musicians. At the age of 14, she got into the Junior Department of The Royal Academy of Music on a scholarship. A year later, she also got into the Junior Jazz course at The Royal Academy of Music.

== Career ==
Ridout won the jazz award for BBC Young Musician of the Year in 2016, where she competed against her brother Tom and three other jazz musicians.

Ridout leads her own band, The Alexandra Ridout Quintet, and is also a member of The Ridouts, a family band with her brother Tom (saxophone), father Mark (guitar), Tristan Mailliot (drums), and Flo Moore (bass). She is also a full-time member of The National Youth Jazz Orchestra.
