= Lough (disambiguation) =

Lough is an anglicised form of the Scottish Gaelic and Irish Loch, meaning 'lake' or 'sea inlet'.

Lough may also refer to:

- Lough (surname), with a list of people of this name
- The Lough, Cork, Ireland, a suburb and lake in Cork city
- USS Lough, a destroyer in the United States Navy

== See also ==
- Loch (disambiguation)
