= Lara Melda =

British concert pianist (born 1993)

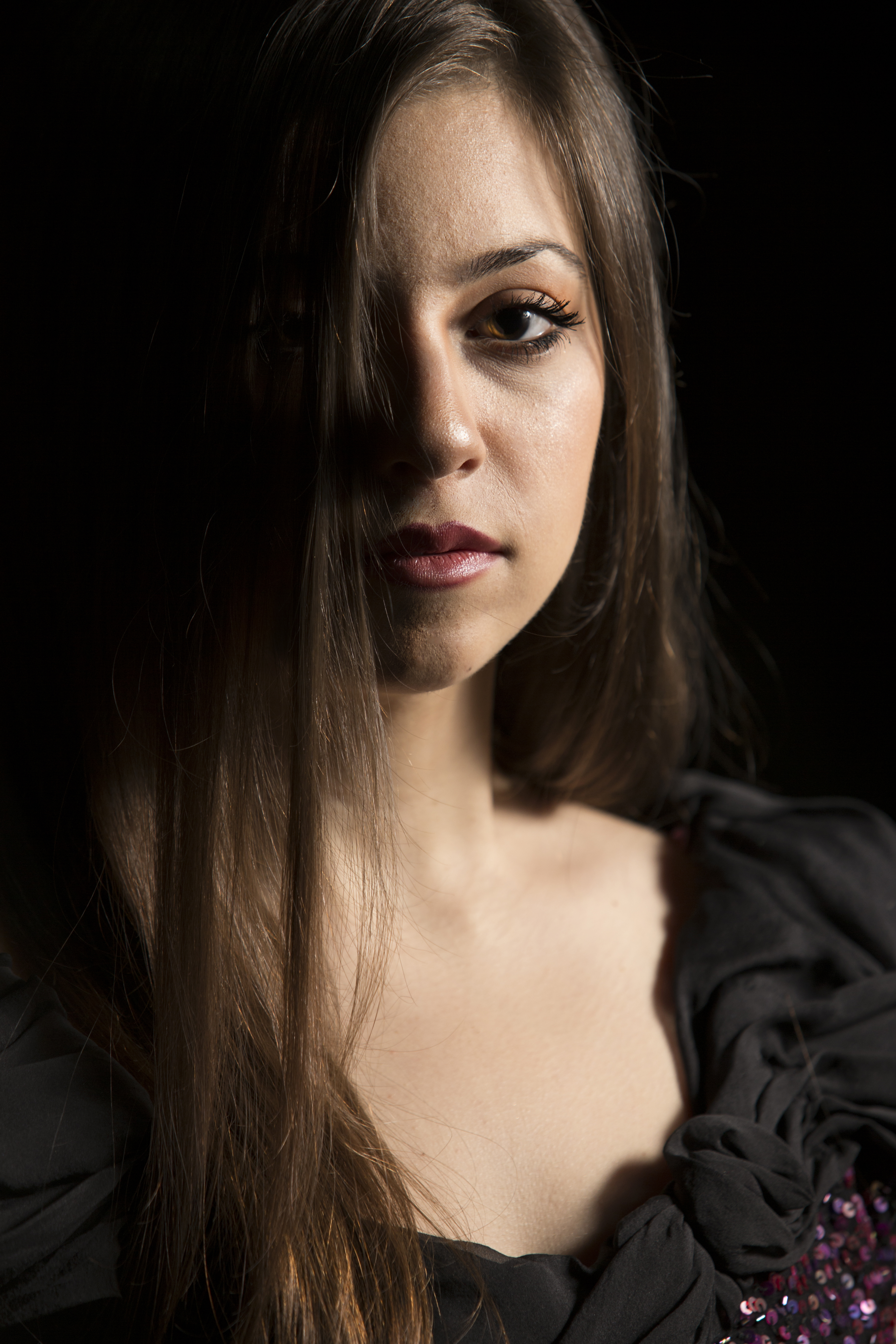
- Lara Melda by Mark Woods-Nunn

Background information
- Also known as: Lara Melda
- Born: Lara Melda Ömeroğlu; 16 December 1993 (age 32); London, UK
- Genre: Classical
- Occupation: Concert Pianist
- Instrument: Piano
- Years active: 2010-present
- Website: www.laramelda.co.uk

Lara Melda Ömeroğlu (born 16 December 1993), known professionally as Lara Melda, is a British concert pianist.

== Early life and education ==
Lara Melda was born in London, United Kingdom to Turkish parents. She began playing the piano at age 6, inspired by her sister Melis Ömeroğlu.

Melda began piano lessons with Emily Jeffrey, and at the age of 18 began studies with Ian Jones. Melda studied at The Purcell School for Young Musicians from 2008 to 2011. For her Bachelor of Music she went to the Royal College of Music where she was a Queen Elizabeth Queen Mother Scholar and graduated with a first class honour in 2016. Melda is also an accomplished viola player and plays chamber music on both piano and viola. In 2015 she was a scholarship holder under the Imogen Cooper Music Trust. She was invited to play for Alfred Brendel in 2016 and continues to work closely with him.

== Professional career ==
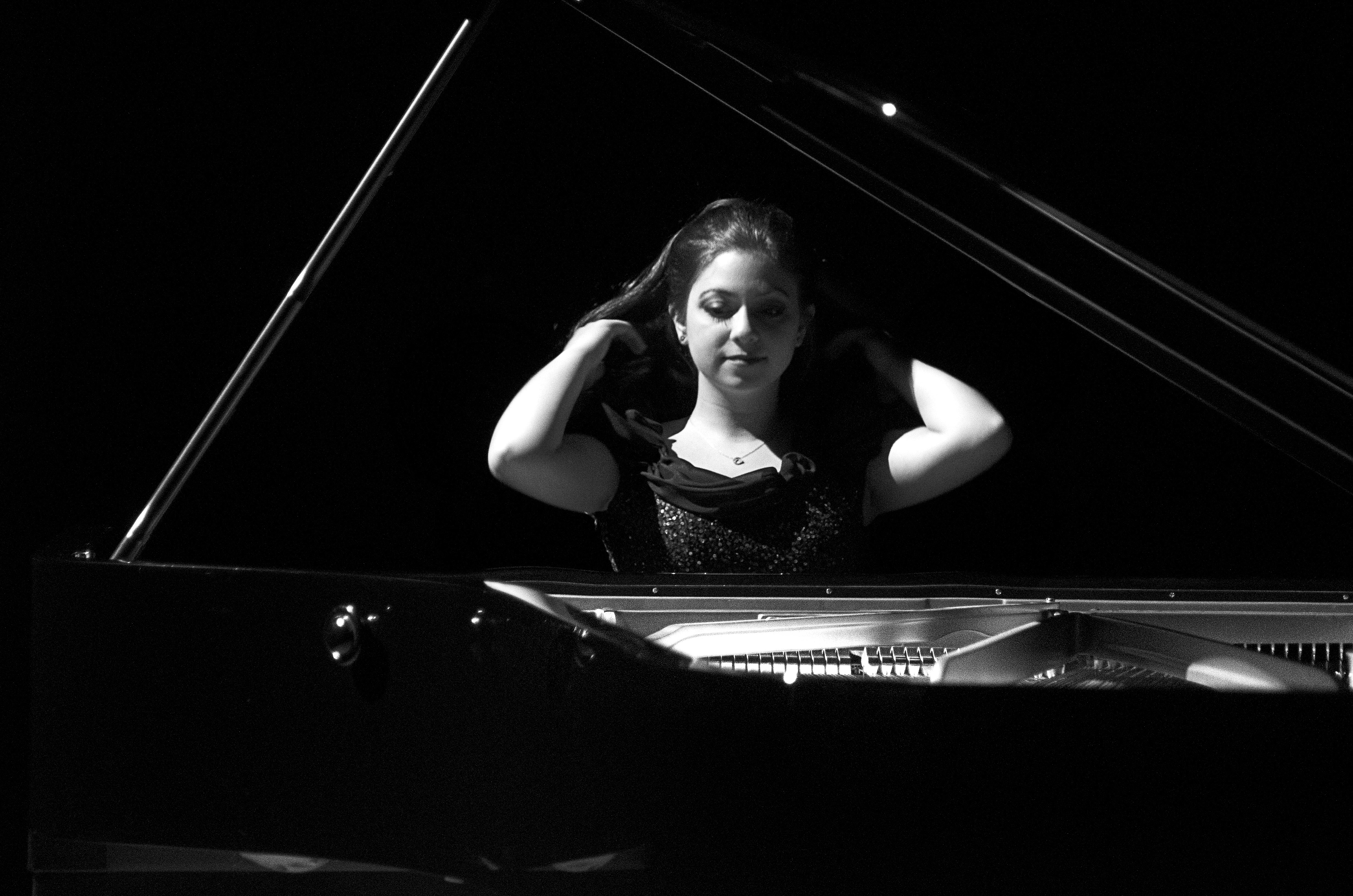
Melda during recital at the Zorlu Center PSM

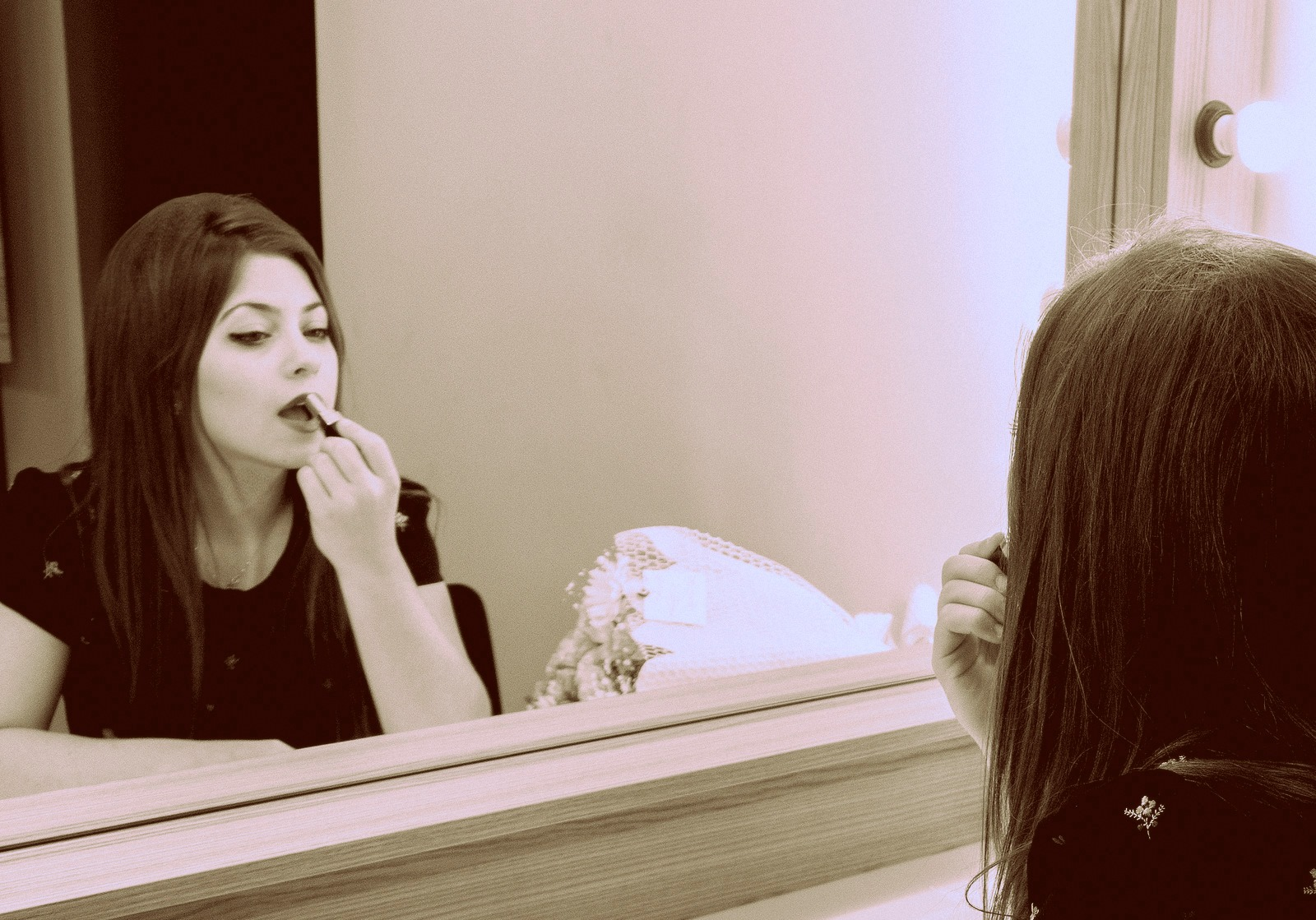
Lara Melda pre-recital backstage 2013

Melda performed her debut concert at the age of 8 and her debut concerto at the age of 12 playing Mozart's Piano Concerto in D minor K466 and Piano Concerto in A major K414. In 2009 she was a finalist in the International Franz Liszt Piano Competition in Weimar, Germany. Melda rose to international prominence in 2010 when she won the BBC Young Musician of the Year at the age of sixteen, performing Saint-Saëns' Piano Concerto No. 2 in the final round, with Vasily Petrenko and the BBC National Orchestra of Wales in Cardiff. The competition had an international following via television and radio broadcasts on the BBC. Since then she has also performed Mozart's Piano Concerto No. 20, as well as Beethoven's Piano Concerto No. 3, with the BBC National Orchestra of Wales.

In the autumn of 2013, Melda made her debut performing at the Barbican Centre in London and also with the Britten Sinfonia in a performance of Britten's Young Apollo with Paul Daniel. Previous concerto performances have included Rachmaninoff with the Royal Northern Sinfonia and Kirill Karabits, Mozart with the Aurora Orchestra and Nicholas Collon (Kings Place) and the Grieg concerto with English Sinfonia (St John's, Smith Square) Ludwig van Beethoven with the New Zealand Symphony Orchestra. She has played recitals at the Laeiszhalle (Hamburg); Les Sommets Musicaux in Gstaad, Switzerland; the Mecklenburg-Vorpommern Festival in Germany and performs often at Wigmore Hall in London.

Melda performs regularly in Turkey and made her debut at the International Music Festival (IKSV) in Istanbul in June 2011, playing the Grieg concerto with the Borusan Philharmonic. She has also been presented by the Istanbul Recitals piano series and performed at the Antalya Piano Festival and Boğaziçi University. On 24 March 2012, she received the prestigious 'Promising Young Artist' award from Kadir Has University in Istanbul, and in 2016 was awarded the 'Woman of the Year Arts Award' by the Elele-Avon Women Awards where in her speech, Melda accepted the award on behalf of Turkish women who feel that they don't have a voice in the public square and for those that have not been given the opportunities in life that she has been fortunate to receive.

Melda is most well known and praised for her Chopin interpretations. A performance of Chopin's 2nd sonata prompted this review: "Unquestionably one of the most outstanding performances of the piece I've ever heard, it evoked its yearning, energy, loneliness, lyricism, fury and gutsiness with playing of stunning precision, technical adroitness and immense, perceptive feeling."
