= Alan Brind =

British violinist (born 1969)

- Born: April 8, 1969 (age 56)
- Genres: Classical
- Occupation: Violinist
- Instrument: Violin

Alan Brind is an English violinist. He performed as a soloist for several years after winning the 1986 BBC Young Musician of the Year at the age of 17. He has since performed in many of the world's leading chamber ensembles and symphony orchestras.

Brind studied with Frederick Grinke, Manoug Parikian, Anne-Sophie Mutter, Zakhar Bron and Christopher Warren-Green. He has performed as soloist with the London Symphony Orchestra, Royal Philharmonic Orchestra, BBC Philharmonic, Danish Radio Symphony Orchestra, Hilversum Radio Orchestra, London Chamber Orchestra and the English Chamber Orchestra.

Following two years as concertmaster of the European Community Youth Orchestra, Brind was a founder member of the European Soloists Ensemble. He was also a member of the Mullova Ensemble which recorded the Bach violin concertos on Philips Classics Records. Fellow members included Klaus Stoll, François Leleux, Marco Postinghel and Manuel Fischer-Dieskau. As an orchestral musician he has played in the Philharmonia Orchestra, London Symphony Orchestra, Academy of St Martin in the Fields, Lucerne Festival Orchestra, London Chamber Orchestra, Netherlands Chamber Orchestra and the English Chamber Orchestra. He is also a member of the Human Rights Orchestra. Conductors he has played under include Bernard Haitink, Claudio Abbado, Carlo Maria Giulini, Yevgeny Svetlanov, Riccardo Muti, Gustavo Dudamel, Charles Dutoit and Kurt Sanderling.

Brind's recordings include the Sibelius Violin Concerto and Chausson Poème with the Royal Philharmonic Orchestra for Chandos Records and Stravinsky's The Soldier's Tale, with Vladimir and Dimitri Ashkenazy for Decca Records.

Brind has recently been appointed professor of violin at the Royal Conservatory of Brussels.

== Personal life ==
Brind lives in the Netherlands with his wife, Colombian scientist Alejandra Maria Ruiz Zapata. He has a daughter from an earlier relationship with violinist Viktoria Mullova.
