= Nicola Loud =

British violinist (born 1975)

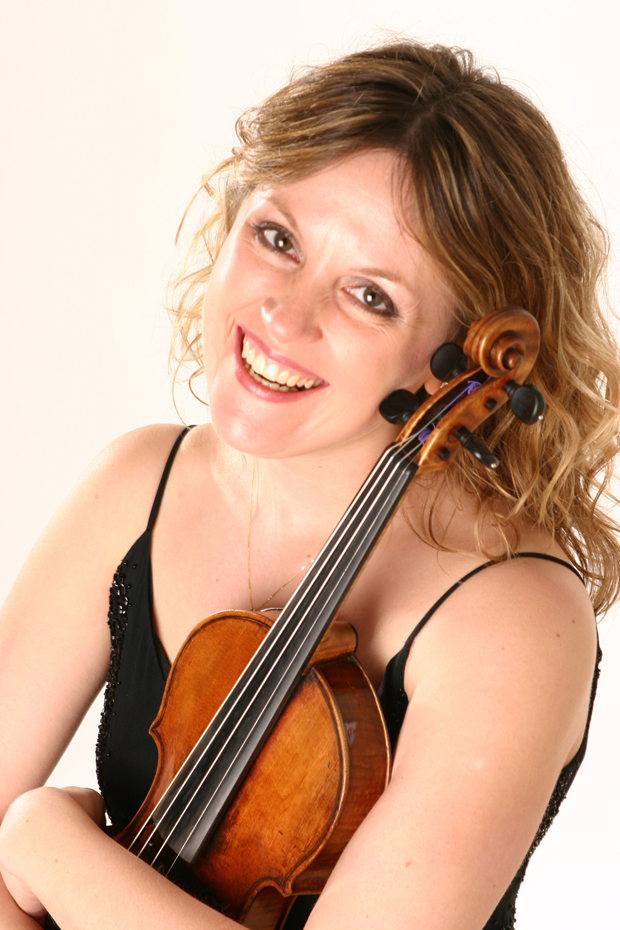

Background information
- Born: 1975 (age 49–50)
- Occupation: Violinist
- Years active: 1990–present
- Labels: EMI Classics
- Website: www.nicolaloud.com

Nicola Loud (born 1975) is a British violinist who, in 1990 at the age of 15, became BBC Young Musician of the Year.

== Early life and career ==
She studied at the Royal Academy of Music with her principal tutor György Pauk who described her as: "Very musical, with fantastic flair and presence - one of the most talented British violinists I had ever come across.".

From London she went to study in New York City with Cho-Liang Lin at the Juilliard School of Music. Loud has performed as a soloist with most of the major UK orchestras and also performs chamber music. In 2001 she created her one-woman show which features a wide range of repertoire including classical, jazz and film music.

In 2003, Nicola Loud was awarded an ARAM by the Royal Academy of Music and in 2008 became a television presenter for the BBC, co-hosting the concerto final of BBC Young Musician of the Year in Cardiff. As a past winner, she was also featured in a documentary celebrating 30 years of the competition, and provided the commentary for the Eurovision Young Musicians 2008 program on BBC Four.

== Personal life ==
In 2012, Loud married former MP Rupert Allason, who writes about espionage under the pen name Nigel West.
