= Jennifer Pike =

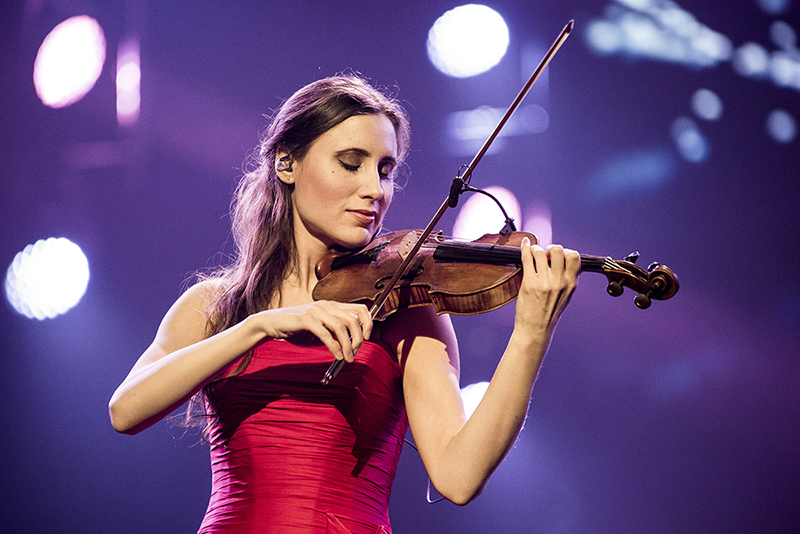
- Jennifer Pike, Lodz, Poland, 2016

Background information
- Born: 9 November 1989 (age 36)
- Genres: Classical
- Occupation: Musician
- Instrument: Violin
- Years active: 2000–present
- Website: Official website

Jennifer Elizabeth Pike MBE (born 9 November 1989) is a British violinist.

== Early years and education ==
Pike began playing the violin at the age of five, and after auditioning at the age of eight she gained a place at Chetham's School of Music in Manchester. At the age of ten she was chosen to play at a concert attended by the Prince of Wales at the Royal Opera House, Covent Garden. She soon made her concerto debut, playing Haydn's Violin Concerto in G with her school orchestra. Her professional orchestra debut was with The Hallé at Bridgewater Hall aged 11.

In 2002 Pike became the thirteenth person to win the BBC Young Musician of the Year Award, following her performance of Mendelssohn's Violin Concerto with the BBC Symphony Orchestra conducted by Sir Andrew Davis. Aged twelve at the time, she was the youngest ever winner of the competition until six years later. Earlier the same year she also won fourth prize in the Junior Section of the Yehudi Menuhin International Violin Competition, making her the youngest major prize-winner of the Competition.

At age 16, she was awarded a scholarship to study at the Guildhall School of Music and Drama. She graduated with First Class Honours in Music from Lady Margaret Hall, Oxford in 2012, where she is now the Artist-In-Residence.

Pike was a member of the BBC Radio 3 New Generation Artists scheme from 2008 to 2010.

== Career highlights ==
Following her success in the BBC Young Musician of the Year, Pike has played in concerts and recitals in major venues all over the world. In July 2005 she took part in the BBC Proms in the Royal Albert Hall, and in November 2005 she made her evening recital debut in the Wigmore Hall, both to great critical acclaim.

In 2009, Pike was a BBC Proms featured artist. She then took part in the 'Night of the Proms' 2016 tour to Poland, where she performed at the Atlas Arena in Łódź to an audience of 11,000, which was also broadcast on Polish TV.

On 19 April 2012, she took part in a live concert in Glasgow, accompanied by the BBC Scottish Symphony Orchestra under the direction of Andrew Manze. The programme, which was aired through BBC Radio 3, included music of Bach and Vaughan Williams.

On 4 August 2014, Pike performed Vaughan Williams's The Lark Ascending at the service of commemoration for the 100th anniversary of World War I at Westminster Abbey.

In 2015 and 2016, Pike toured Mexico with the London Philharmonic Orchestra, performing with the Oslo Philharmonic as part of the Sibelius festival 150th year celebrations and performing as a director and soloist with the BBC Philharmonic. She also took part in a broadcast performance of Schindler's List as part of BBC Two's Holocaust Memorial Day tribute, as well as a live broadcast on Classic FM for the Queen's 90th Birthday celebration concert.

Pike was appointed Member of the Order of the British Empire (MBE) in the 2020 Birthday Honours for services to classical music.

== Contemporary music and commissions ==
In 2017 Pike curated 'Polish Music Day' at Wigmore Hall in London, featuring three concerts of Polish music including a specially commissioned work by contemporary Polish composer Paulina Załubska, and the UK premiere of Krzysztof Penderecki's Capriccio for solo violin.

Pike has had many pieces written specially for her, such as Hafliði Hallgrímsson's Violin Concerto, which she premiered with the Iceland Symphony Orchestra and Scottish Chamber Orchestra. Other commissions for Pike include Andrew Schultz's Violin Concerto and Sonatina for solo violin, and Charlotte Bray's Scenes from Wonderland, premiered with the London Philharmonic Orchestra at Royal Festival Hall in London.

In celebration of the 40th anniversary of BBC Young Musician, Pike performed the world premiere performance of David Bruce's 'Sidechaining' as part of a BBC commission for four soloists and orchestra at the 2018 Proms. She was joined by fellow BBC Young Musician winners Nicholas Daniel, Michael Collins and Ben Goldscheider, performing with the BBC Concert Orchestra under Andrew Gourlay.

In 2020 Pike performed the world premiere of a piece by composer Dani Howard called 'Dualism' for violin and piano. Written specifically for Pike and pianist Martin Roscoe, the piece received its premiere at Wigmore Hall in January 2020.

== Charitable work ==
Pike works with multiple charities across the UK, and is an acting ambassador for The Prince's Foundation for Children and the Arts, The Prince's Trust, London Music Masters, City Music Foundation and The Wellspring in her home town of Stockport.

She also spoke out in support for the performing arts following the Covid-19 pandemic, including a performance on the steps of Manchester Central Library with Vanessa Redgrave to bring media attention to the plight of struggling artists.

== Discography ==
Her discography includes recordings with Chandos, Sony and ABC Classics. She has recorded with the Bergen Symphony and Sir Andrew Davis, the BBC Philharmonic and Rumon Gamba, the Tasmanian Symphony Orchestra and the City of Birmingham Symphony and Edward Gardner.

=== Albums ===
Title	Details
Debussy, Ravel and Franck Sonatas	Released: November 2010; Label: Chandos; Formats: Digital download, CD
Miklós Rózsa: Variations on a Hungarian Peasant Song	Released: May 2011; Label: Chandos; Formats: Digital download, CD
Andrew Schultz Violin Concerto	Released: July 2011; Label: ABC Classics
Miklós Rósza: Violin Concerto	Released: October 2012; Label: Chandos; Formats: Digital download, CD
Chausson Concert for Violin, Piano and String Quartet	Released: November 2012; Label: Chandos; Formats: Digital download, CD
Brahms & Schumann Sonatas, Clara Schumann Romances	Released: November 2012; Label: Chandos; Formats: Digital download, CD
Sibelius Violin Concerto	Released: February 2014; Label: Chandos; Formats: Digital download, CD
Janacek, Dvorak and Suk: Music for Violin and Piano	Released: July 2014; Label: Chandos; Formats: Digital download, CD
Bach to Moog	Released: May 2015; Label: Sony Classical; Formats: Digital download, CD
David Bednall Stabat Mater	Released: December 2015; Label: Regent Records; Formats: Digital download, CD
Mendelssohn Violin Concerto	Released: December 2015; Label: Chandos; Formats: Digital download, CD
Vaughan Williams The Lark Ascending	Released: November 2016; Label: Naxos; Formats: Digital download, CD
The Polish Violin	Released: February 2019; Label: Chandos; Formats: Digital download, CD
Like to the Lark	Released: January 2020; Label: Chandos; Formats: Digital download, CD
Elgar/Vaughan Williams sonatas; The Lark Ascending (1914 version)	Released: July 2020; Label: Chandos; Formats: Digital download, CD
The Polish Violin Vol.2	Released: October 2021; Label: Chandos; Formats: Digital download, CD
