= Jordan Ashman =

British multi-percussionist

- Born: 25 June 2004 (age 22); Bury St Edmunds, England
- Genres: Classical
- Instrument: Percussion
- Member of: The GUS Band
- Website: www.jordanashman.com

Jordan Ashman is a British multi-percussionist born in 2004 in Bury St Edmunds, and is the winner of the BBC Young Musician of the Year award in 2022.

== Early life and education ==
Jordan Ashman grew up in Cambridge where he attended Impington Village College, from 2015 to 2020.

== Prizes, awards and accolades ==
Ashman won the 2022 BBC Young Musician of the Year Grand Final with his performance of American composer Jennifer Higdon's Percussion Concerto, written in 2005 for Colin Currie.

The 2022 British Open Brass Band Solo Championship saw Jordan win the Youth section and come runner up in the Open section.

Starting in 2014, he played with the National Children's Orchestra of Great Britain. In 2022, he became principal percussionist with the National Youth Brass Band of Great Britain, winning the Sir Harry Mortimer solo prize during the summer course 2022.

During the COVID-19 pandemic, Ashman won the Southwest Brass Band Association's under 18 percussion and open percussion classes, best percussionist in the 2020 Online Salford Solo Contest, the most promising player in the 2020-2021 Southern Percussion International Tuned Competition, the percussion category of the Foden's Online Solo Competition, and the Davison Young Musicians, Patron's Award. On winning the Davison Young Musician’s Patron’s Award Commodore Duncan Lustig-Prean said "I selected Jordan because of the sheer artistry of his performance. His dynamic range was astonishing, showing considerable musicality. He displayed a maturity of interpretation well beyond his years and I look forward to his musical career with great enthusiasm".

Ashman has performed extensively with Youth Brass who, in 2022 became UK National Youth Champions for the seventh year in a row.

He joined The GUS Band in 2018 aged just 14, and is also a member of Junior Prime Brass, a 10-piece brass ensemble plus percussion, based in Cambridge.

In 2025, he performed as a soloist on the National Youth Orchestra's 'To the Beat' Tour performing Jennifer Higdon's Percussion Concerto at the Roundhouse, Birmingham Town Hall, Sheffield City Hall, and Bridgewater Hall under Alpesh Chauhan.
