= Rosemary Rapaport =

British violinist (1918–2011)

- Born: Nancy Rosemary Peace Rapaport; 29 March 1918; St Albans, England
- Died: 8 June 2011 (aged 93); Olney, England
- Education: Royal Academy of Music
- Occupation(s): Violinist, music teacher
- Known for: Founder of Purcell School
- Spouse: Gerard Heller

Rosemary Rapaport (29 March 1918 in St Albans – 8 June 2011 in Olney) was a violinist and music teacher who founded the Purcell School for musically gifted children.

== Early years ==
Nancy Rosemary Peace Rapaport was born into a Rabbinic family. She was the youngest of four daughters who all showed artistic talent. Although handicapped as a child by a double mastoid infection, she took up the violin at the age of eight. She also had lessons in piano and ballet. She was home educated until the age of 12, after which she attended the North London Collegiate School. In 1937 she was awarded an Associated Board scholarship at the Royal Academy of Music, winning two medals for her violin playing. Her teachers included Rowsby Woof and Frederick Grinke.

In 1941 she left the Royal Academy of Music and joined the Halle Orchestra. While in Manchester she married Gerard Heller, an insurance dealer who was an amateur pianist. They later moved to Leeds where she formed a duo with Fanny Waterman with whom she gave recitals in schools under the auspices of the local education authority. She taught at the Leeds Girls' High School from 1943 to 1947.

After World War II she and her husband moved to London where she formed a partnership with the Viennese pianist Else Cross that lasted for over 25 years. Their concerts included recitals in the Wigmore Hall. Their programmes included rarely heard classical works as well as the standard repertoire.

== Purcell School ==
Rapaport had long been of the opinion that there was a lack of suitable education for exceptionally gifted musical children. She visited Czechoslovakia where she was able to see specialist schools in operation. On her return, she and her friend Irene Foster decided to set up a school which would cater for children with special musical talent.

In 1962 they founded the Central Tutorial School for Young Musicians. They persuaded Sir Thomas Armstrong (Principal of the Royal Academy of Music), Keith Falkner (Director of the Royal College of Music), Yehudi Menuhin and Fanny Waterman to be their Patrons. There were only four pupils at first, using temporary accommodation at the Conway Hall, London, and then at Morley College. Numbers grew, and they moved to their own premises in Hampstead. Rapaport was involved in the daily running of school. As numbers continued to grow, however, it became necessary to move again, and the school, by now called the Purcell School, moved to a large house in Harrow. Later it moved again to its present site in Bushey in Hertfordshire. During these later years Rapaport's direct involvement lessened, but she maintained close links with the school, taking an interest in the pupils’ progress.

== Later years ==
In 1947 she returned to the Royal Academy of Music as a professor of violin. In 1958 she was made a Fellow of the Royal Academy of Music (FRAM). After her husband's death in 1958, she set up the Gerard Heller Memorial Quartet Prize which was to be awarded biannually to string quartets from leading music colleges. In 2005 it was awarded to the Sacconi Quartet.

In 1967, she left London to live in Newton Blossomville, a small village in Buckinghamshire near the Bedfordshire border. Sir Thomas Armstrong had a house there to which he and his wife moved on his retirement from the RAM. Rapaport continued to teach: at the RAM, privately, and at Bedford High School the Dame Alice Harpur School and the Perse School.

After the death of Lady Armstrong, she and Sir Thomas moved to Olney where they set up a house together, sharing their love of music whilst each retaining their own space. She cared for Sir Thomas in his final days, and continued to live in the house after he died in 1994.

Rosemary Rapaport was small in stature but with strong views which she communicated with authority. She liked a good argument and could hold forth about a wide variety of topics. As a teacher she was demanding but always kind, insisting on a good technique and instilling a love of music in all her pupils. For many years she was accompanied everywhere by Fingal, her West Highland Terrier, who would sit on the foot of any pupil who was tapping it to the music. She was an animal lover and supported the Wood Green Animal Shelter.

Some of her pupils became lifelong friends, always keeping in touch with the teacher who had inspired them to play their best.
