= Ant Law =

British jazz guitarist and composer

- Born: 15 November 1983 (age 42); Jeddah, Saudi Arabia
- Genre: Jazz
- Occupations: Musician, composer
- Instrument: Guitar
- Years active: 2003-present
- Website: www.antlaw.co.uk

Ant Law (born 15 November 1983) is a British jazz guitarist and composer.

Ant Law was born in Jeddah, Saudi Arabia, where he lived until the age of 16.. During his childhood and teenage years, he learnt guitar and piano, and while studying physics at University of Edinburgh, he spent a summer semester at Berklee College of Music in Boston.

From the 2000s onwards, he became an active presence on the British jazz scene, and early collaborations included working with singer Lorna Reid, playing on a track of her 2008 album Gypsy In My Soul

In 2011, he founded the Ant Law Quintet, which toured widely and released their debut album, Entanglement., in 2013. With the exception of two tracks—a rendition of a jazz standard, John Coltrane’s Satellite, and a contrafact on Sonny Rollins’ Airegin—the album consisted entirely of Law's original compositions, a pattern that would continue across many of his later releases. Their follow-up, Zero Sum World (2015), featured music and titles inspired by scientific and mathematical ideas. Writing about the album, Ian Mann observed that “for all the sophistication of his harmonic and rhythmic ideas, Law’s music is also surprisingly accessible with a strong melodic focus alongside the complexities.”

The quintet's third album, Life I Know (2018), was described in London Jazz News as “full-on modern jazz fusion.” A digital-only album, The Sleeper Wakes, followed in 2020, with Unified Theories released in 2025, featuring pianist Gwilym Simcock and saxophonist Will Vinson.

In 2015, Law co-founded Trio HLK with pianist Rich Harrold and drummer Rich Kass, the group's name derived from the initials of their surnames. Their debut album, Standard Time. (2018), featured guest appearances from American saxophonist Steve Lehman and percussionist Dame Evelyn Glennie. Describing this album, Gramophone Magazine wrote that “Nancarrow-style polymetres collide and fuse with complex harmonies in radical reinterpretations of jazz standards.” The album was included in Gramophone Magazine's Critics' Choice 2018

Evelyn Glennie also featured on Trio HLK's second release, Anthropometricks (2024), together with Varijashree Venugopal and Natalie Clein. This presented seven compositions using sections of jazz standards as their foundation. Neil Duggan writing in All About Jazz observed that “these are not gentle adaptations of parts of original tunes but a complete process of deconstruction and re-composition.” Trio HLK has performed widely, with appearances at Queen's Hall, Edinburgh in 2018, Fasching, Stockholm (2020), Kontserdisaal, Tallinn (2020), and Kings Place, London in 2024.

Beyond his ensemble work, Law has pursued numerous collaborations. These projects include Same Moon in The Same World (2022) with saxophonist Alex Hitchcock, and Ensconced (2024) with singer Brigitte Beraha. As a sideman, Law has frequently worked with saxophonist Tim Garland, appearing on Songs to the North Sky (2014), Return to the Fire (2015) and One (2016) which topped the Jazzwise Albums of the Year Critics Poll in 2016. In addition, Law has worked with violinist Thomas Gould, bassist Matt Ridley, and saxophonist Emma Rawicz

Among many notable performances, Law has appeared at Cambridge Jazz Festival in 2019, London Jazz Festival (most recently in 2022, 2023 and 2024) Love Supreme 2023, and Vancouver International Jazz Festival in 2018. He has been a regular presence at leading London venues, including Ronnie Scott's, the Vortex, and PizzaExpress Jazz Club.

In addition to his work as a performer, Law is also an author and teacher. His book 3rd Millennium Guitar: An Introduction to Perfect 4th Tuning was published by Mel Bay Publications in 2017, and he has contributed articles on music theory and technique for magazines such as Total Guitar, Guitar Techniques and Guitarist. As of 2025, he teaches at Royal Welsh College of Music & Drama and holds the position of Associate Lecturer at Goldsmith's, University of London. He has also given masterclasses at institutions such as Royal Academy of Music, Trinity Laban Conservatoire of Music and Dance and Guildhall School of Music and Drama.

In 2018, Law was included in 10 contemporary guitar virtuosos you need to hear, published by Music Radar., and he was named in the Rising Star Guitarist category in the 73rd Annual Downbeat Critics Poll (2025).

== Discography ==
=== Ant Law Quintet ===
- Entanglement (33 Records, 2013)
- Zero Sum World (Whirlwind Recordings, 2015)
- Life I Know (Edition Records, 2018)
- The Sleeper Wakes (Edition Records, 2020)
- Unified Theories (2025)

=== Trio HLK ===
- Standard Time (Ubuntu Music, 2018)
- Anthropometricks (Ubuntu Music, 2024)

=== Collaborations ===
- Same Moon in The Same World with Alex Hitchcock (Outside Music, 2022)
- Ensconced with Brigitte Beraha (Ubuntu Music, 2024)

=== As sideman (selected recordings) ===
- Songs to the North Sky — Tim Garland (Edition Records, 2014)
- Return to the Fire — Tim Garland (Edition Records, 2015)
- Into View — Paul Riley (Jellymould Jazz, 2015)
- One — Tim Garland (Edition Records, 2016)
- Counteraction — Partikel (Whirlwind Recordings, 2017)
- Refocus — Tim Garland (Edition Records, 2020)
- The Antidote — Matt Ridley (Ubuntu Music, 2021)
- Incantation — Emma Rawicz (2022)
- Chroma — Emma Rawicz (2023)
- The Antidote: Live at the London Jazz Festival — Matt Ridley (Ubuntu Music, 2023)
- Dream Band — Alex Hitchcock (Whirlwind Recordings, 2023)
- Clouded Lines — Scott Flanigan (SF Sounds, 2023)
- The Defector — Henry Spencer (AMP Music & Records, 2023)
