= Claire Allen (musician) =

British cornet and trumpet player

Claire Allen is a British cornet and trumpet player.

Claire came to prominence after receiving the BBC Young Musician of the Year 1994 Brass class award.

Claire has played with the Tintwistle Band, Sellers International Band, Black Dyke Band, and The Central Band of the Royal Air Force.

Recently, she has tutored at the 2009 National Children’s Brass Band of Great Britain event, and currently performs with The City of Bradford Brass Band.
