= Ethan Loch =

Blind Scottish pianist and composer

Ethan David Loch (born 2004) is a Scottish pianist and composer. Born blind, Loch was a competitor in the BBC Young Musician 2022 competition. He reached the competition's grand final, after winning the keyboard category final.

== Early life ==
Loch was born in 2004 in Blantyre, (Note: Some sources state Loch was born in Bonnybridge.) Scotland, to Larinda and Fraser Loch. At ten weeks old, he contracted bacterial meningitis and almost died. During eye examinations doctors noticed an unrelated defect in his retinas. At around ten months old he was formally diagnosed with Leber's Congenital Amaurosis. Until the age of five, Loch resided in Vancouver, Canada.

Loch has been playing piano since he was eighteen months old. By the age of three-and-a-half, he had learned the first movement of Beethoven's Piano Sonata No. 14 (Moonlight Sonata). Under the tutoring of his mother, he began studying piano at the age of four using the Suzuki method. Loch has been composing since he was a child and has perfect pitch.

== Education ==
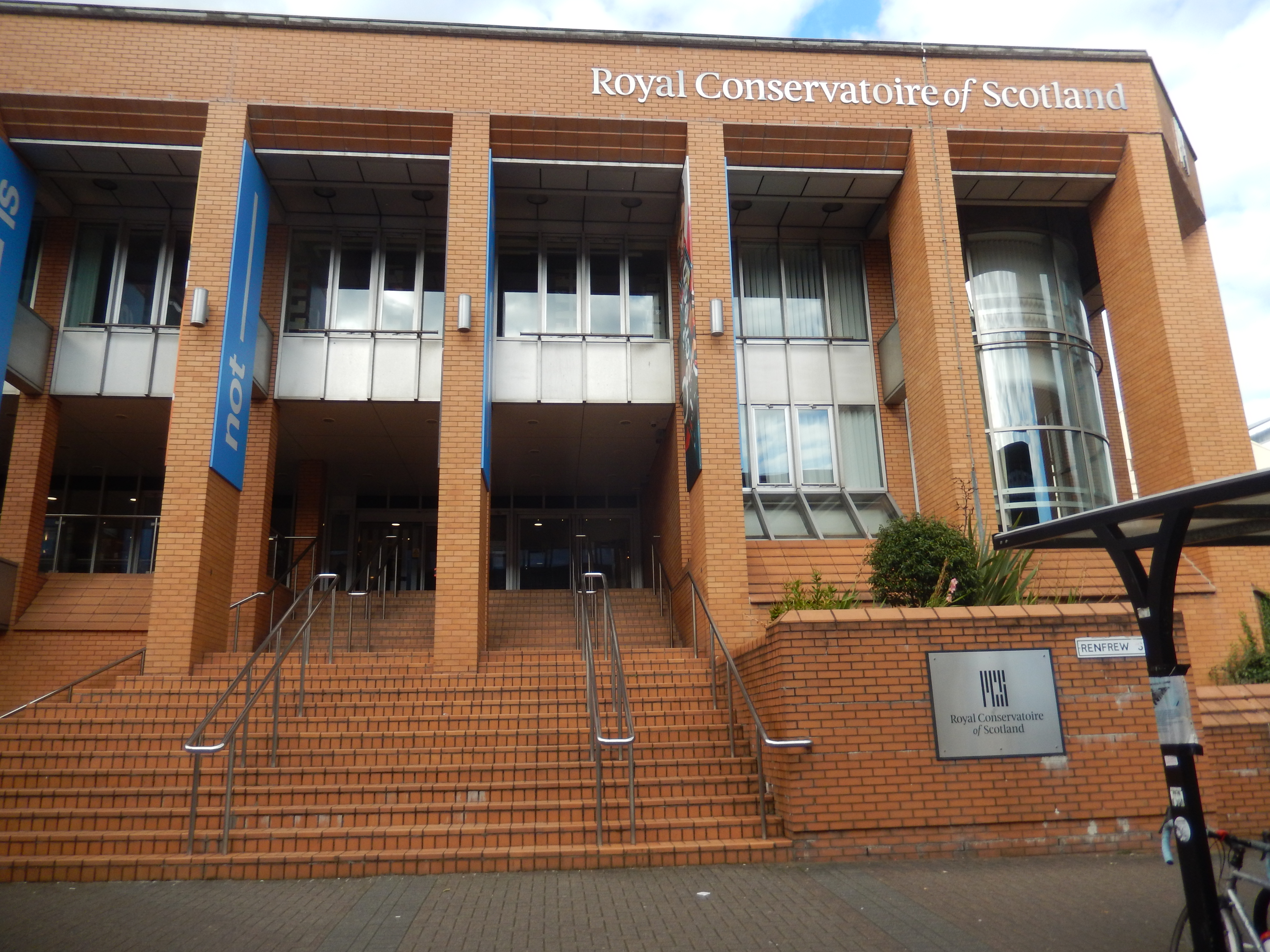
Loch is currently studying at the Royal Conservatoire of Scotland.

For his primary education, Loch was homeschooled by his parents. At the age of twelve, he started piano lessons with Simon Bottomley in Manchester. Under Bottomley, Loch developed his piano technique; of Bottomley's teaching, Loch stated:

He was the teacher who gave me the technical brilliance. I would definitely say I needed a bit more discipline in technical areas, and he really pushed me.

To help walk safely and avoid obstacles, Loch was taught echolocation by Daniel Kish. This relationship with Kish was the subject of a BBC Radio documentary called Batman and Ethan.

After a successful audition on 26 January 2015, Loch spent a year at St Mary's Music School, Edinburgh. Loch was St Mary's first blind pupil. As of 2023, Loch then studied piano at the Royal Conservatoire of Scotland under Fali Pavri. Aside from the piano, Loch also plays the accordion.

== Career ==
Loch learns music aurally, as opposed to reading braille music. To learn a piece, he first listens to multiple recordings to memorise notes and rhythms. After checking through the score with his mother and teacher, Loch begins practising the piece.

=== BBC Young Musician ===
Loch was a participant in the BBC Young Musician 2022. He won the competition's keyboard final, playing the fourth movement of Chopin's Piano Sonata No. 3; Scriabin's Poème, Op. 32, No. 1; and Debussy's Feux d'artifice. On hearing his playing, the judging panel chair Anna Lapwood remarked:

There's something about him, the way he plays, his sincerity, that made us all remember why we're involved in music-making, and it's to be moved. It's to experience those moments, when you don't expect them necessarily, where you witness something that feels genuinely life-changing through music.

Loch then progressed to the grand final, appearing alongside Jaren Ziegler, Sofía Patterson-Gutiérrez, Sasha Canter and Jordan Ashman. He played Chopin's Piano Concerto No. 2 and performed some of his own pieces and improvisation, performing with Mark Wigglesworth and the BBC Philharmonic.

== Inspirations ==
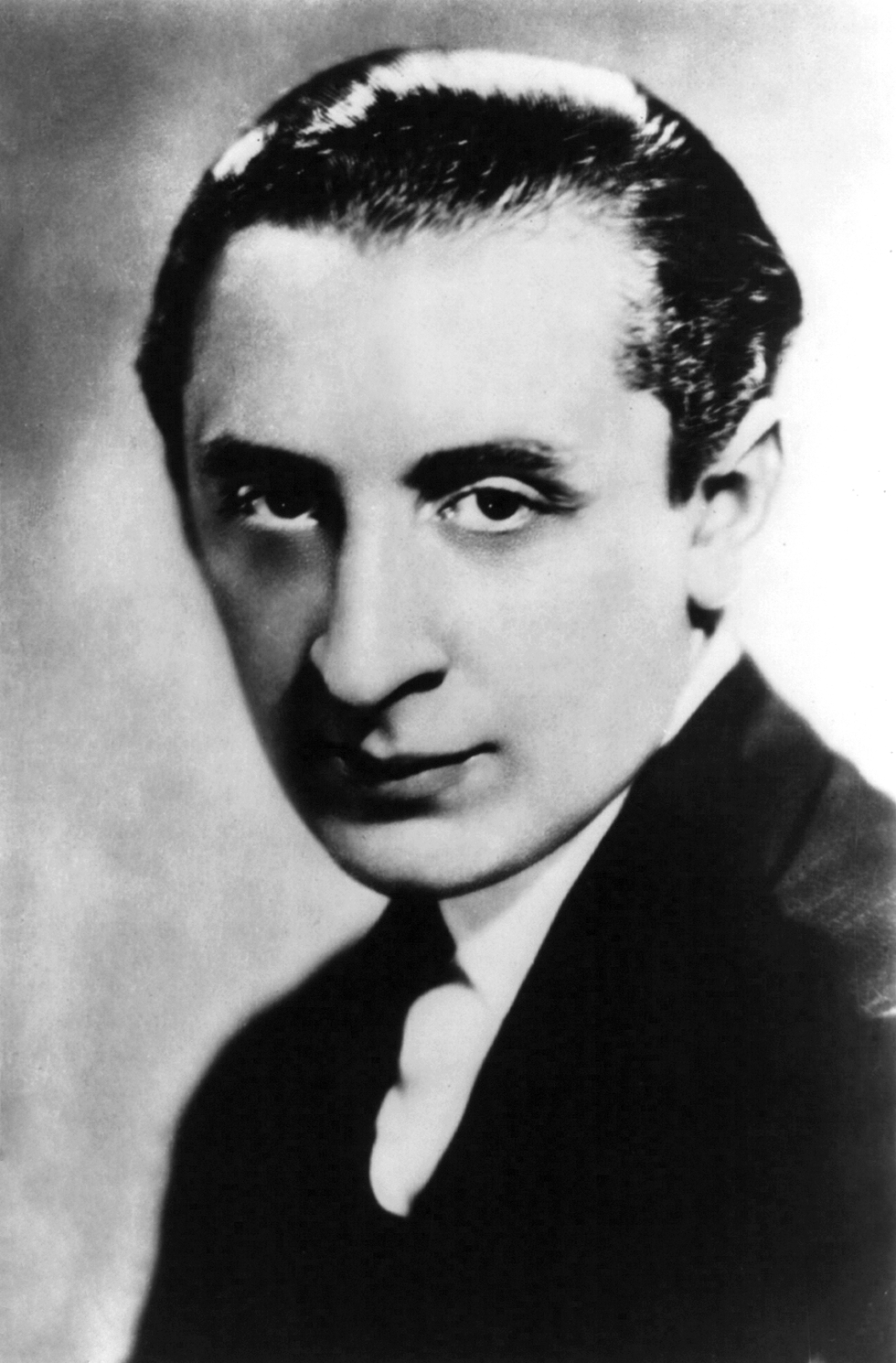
Vladimir Horowitz served as an inspiration to Loch.

Loch has two inspirations to his playing. As a child, he was inspired by Rowlf the Dog, the piano-playing dog from The Muppet Show. He was also inspired by the Russian-American pianist Vladimir Horowitz; Loch would often play Horowitz's 1987 recording, Horowitz in Vienna, on DVD.

== Awards ==
- Overall winner of the 15th International Giuseppe Sciacca Awards (2016)
- Seventh James Waterhouse Loretto Piano Competition winner (2017)
- Scottish International Youth Piano Competition senior division winner (2019)

== Discography ==
- Mysterious Pathways (2019)
