= BBC Young Dancer =

- Awarded for: Exceptional dancing talent
- Location: Various; Roundhouse, London (2022)
- Country: United Kingdom
- Presented by: British Broadcasting Corporation (BBC)
- Rewards: Trophy and £3,000 (main prize)
- First award: 2015; 11 years ago
- Final award: 2022; 4 years ago
- Winner: Adhya Shastry (2022)
- Website: BBC Young Dancer website

Television/radio coverage
- Network: BBC Four and BBC Two
- Related: BBC Young Musician

BBC Young Dancer is a televised national dance competition, broadcast on BBC Four and BBC Two, which aired between 2015 and 2022. The competition, inspired by the success of the biennial BBC Young Musician of the Year, was designed for British amateur dancers of ballet, contemporary, hip hop and South Asian dance, all of whom must be aged between 16 and 20.

== History ==
BBC Young Dancer was launched in October 2014 by Director-General of the BBC, Tony Hall and was part of BBC Four's Year of Song and Dance. Cuban ballet dancer Carlos Acosta was the competition's ambassador. On 14 January 2015, ballet dancer and Strictly Come Dancing judge Darcey Bussell was announced as co-presenter and dance expert for the Grand Final of the inaugural competition, which was aired live from Sadler's Wells Theatre on BBC Two in May. Zoe Ball and Clemency Burton-Hill were her co-hosts. There were different judges for each style. The category finals for each style were filmed at the Riverfront Arts Centre in Newport and later broadcast weekly on BBC Four. Contemporary dancer Connor Scott won the inaugural competition on 9 May 2015. The grand final was judged by a panel of dance experts: Matthew Bourne, Mavin Khoo, Wayne McGregor, Tamara Rojo, Kenrick Sandy and Alistair Spalding.

The next competition was held in 2017, contemporary dancer Nafisah Baba was announced as the winner of the overall title on 22 April. The category finals were moved to The Lowry in Salford, however the grand final remained at Sadler's Wells Theatre. The televised grand final was hosted by Bussell, Anita Rani and Ore Oduba; it was judged by Kevin O'Hare, Jasmin Vardimon, Marc Brew, Kate Prince, Kenneth Tharp, and Nahid Siddiqui.

The 2019 title, held on 18 May at Birmingham Hippodrome, was won by street dancer Max Revell. The judges this year were McGregor, Shobana Jeyasingh, Emma Gladstone, Christopher Hampson, Junior Bosila Banya and Chitra Sundaram.

The competition returned in 2022 with a new format open to all dance styles; the category finals in Salford were replaced by in-person auditions held in front of a professional panel of judges in Shoreditch, London, with those successful in this round making it through to the final ten who attended a week-long dance residency at Dartington Hall in Devon. Across the four-episode series, the finalists were put through their paces by leading choreographers to prepare new works for the grand final in London's Roundhouse where the winner was crowned. The grand final was judged by Prince, Arthur Pita, Subathra Subramaniam and Ryoichi Hirano.

== Hosts ==
The following have hosted stages of the competition:

- Darcey Bussell (2015–2017, finals only)
- Zoe Ball (2015 final)
- Clemency Burton-Hill (2015 final)
- Anita Rani (2017–2019)
- Ore Oduba (2017 final, 2019)
- Clara Amfo (2022)

== Winners ==
Year	Name	Category	Place of study or training	Winning age	Finals venue
2015	Connor Scott	Contemporary	Dance City Centre, Gateshead College	17	Sadler's Wells Theatre, London
2017	Nafisah Baba	Contemporary	Chrysalis, London	20	Sadler's Wells Theatre, London
2019	Max Revell	Street Dance	Northern School of Contemporary Dance	20	Birmingham Hippodrome
2022	Adhya Shastry	Bharatanatyam	National Youth Dance Company	17	Roundhouse, London

== Past finalists ==
Key

†	Person won the competition of that year
**Bold**	Performer won the category final and a place to the grand final
Italics	Performer was given a "wildcard" through to the grand final
‡	Performer was awarded one of two jury awards

=== 2015 ===
Name	Category
Anaya Bolar	South Asian
**Archie Sullivan**	Ballet
Connor Scott †	Contemporary
Diana Patience	Contemporary
Hamish Scott	Ballet
**Harry Barnes**	Hip Hop
**Jacob O’Connell**	Contemporary
Jaina Modasia	South Asian
Jenny Hackwell	Ballet
Jodelle Douglas	Hip Hop
Jonadette Carpio	Hip Hop
Kai Tomioka	Contemporary
Kasichana Okene-Jameson	Contemporary
Kieran Lai	Hip Hop
Lakshmi Ranjan	South Asian
Paris Fitzpatrick	Ballet
Sayaka Ishibashi	Ballet
Sharifa Tonkmor	Hip Hop
Sivani Balachandran	South Asian
**Vidya Patel**	South Asian

=== 2017 ===
Name	Category
Harry Barnes	Street Dance
Tom Hughes Lloyd	Street Dance
**Jodelle Douglas**	Street Dance
Kate Morris	Street Dance
Darren Hamilton	Street Dance
Ryan Felix	Ballet
Jade Wallace	Ballet
**Rhys Antoni Yeomans**	Ballet
Uyu Hiromoto	Ballet
Oscar Ward	Ballet
Akshay Prakash	South Asian Dance
Jaina Modasia	South Asian Dance
Anaya Bolar	South Asian Dance
**Shyam Dattani**	South Asian Dance
Anjelli Wignakumar	South Asian Dance
Nora Monsecour	Contemporary Dance
Jacob Lang	Contemporary Dance
John-William Watson	Contemporary Dance
**Nafisah Baba** †	Contemporary Dance
Joshua Attwood	Contemporary Dance

=== 2019 ===
Name	Category
Aishani Ghosh	South Asian Dance
Hahika Gautam	South Asian Dance
Sundaresan Ramesh	South Asian Dance
Tulani Kayani-Skeef	South Asian Dance
**Shree Savani**	South Asian Dance
Max Cookward	Contemporary Dance
Adanna Lawrence	Contemporary Dance
Hannah Connor	Contemporary Dance
**Matthew Rawcliffe**	Contemporary Dance
Hana Kato	Contemporary Dance
**Chloe Keneally**	Ballet
Hollie Smith	Ballet
Louis Fukuhara	Ballet
Danila Marzilli	Ballet
Keiko Tsuchiya	Ballet
**Thomas Carsley**	Street Dance
Louie Juster	Street Dance
Christian Griffin	Street Dance
Kate Morris	Street Dance
Max Revell †	Street Dance

=== 2022 ===
Name	Dance style
Adhya Shastry †	Bharatanatyam
Anna Daly	Contemporary
Elisabeth Mulenga ‡	Contemporary
Hannah Joseph	Contemporary
Kai Scanlan	Tap
Lauren Scott	Street
Maiya Leeke	Contemporary
Matthew Eudu	Street
Olivia Chang-Clarke	Ballet
Robert Dunkley-Gyimah ‡	Contemporary
