= Peter Moore (trombonist) =

Northern Irish trombonist (born 1996)

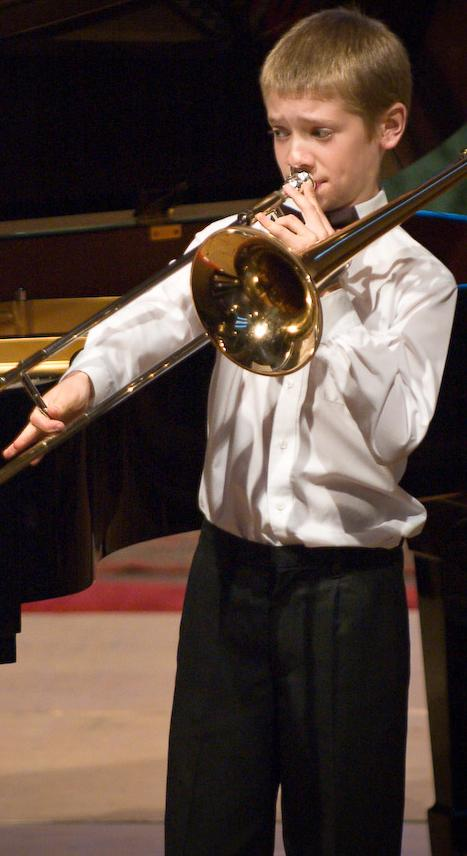
- Moore in 2007

Background information
- Born: 1 January 1996 (age 30); Belfast, Northern Ireland
- Origin: Stalybridge, Greater Manchester
- Occupation: Principal trombonist at the London Symphony Orchestra
- Instrument: Trombone

Peter Moore is a Northern Irish trombonist. He was brought up in Stalybridge, Greater Manchester and studied at Chethams School of Music in Manchester, leaving in 2014.

Moore was the winner of BBC Young Musician of the Year in May 2008, when he was only 12 years old. Moore is the youngest winner of the competition to date, which is open to young persons aged 18 and under.

On 29 May 2014, it was announced that the London Symphony Orchestra had appointed Moore its co-principal trombonist, at 18 the youngest ever member of the orchestra.

From 2014 to 2019 Peter was represented by Young Classical Artists Trust (YCAT).

== Discography ==
Edward Gregson's Trombone Concerto with BBC Concert Orchestra; Bramwell Tovey, conductor (Chandos CHAN 10627) – 2011

Life Force with James Baillieu, piano (Rubicon RCD1028) – 2018

Shift: Works for Trombone and Brass Band - works by Arthur Pryor, Gordon Langford, Phoebe Knapp, Erik William Gustav Leidzén, George Bassman, Simon Dobson and Philip Sparke, with the Tredegar Town Band conducted by Ian Porthouse (Chandos SACD) – 2025
