= Loche =

Loche may refer to:

== People ==
- Arthur Loche (mid 20th c.), American college basketball coach
- Salomon Blosset de Loche (c. 1648–1721), Huguenot army officer
- Victor Loche (1806–1863), French soldier and naturalist

== Places ==
=== Canada ===
- La Loche River (Ashuapmushuan River), Quebec
- La Loche, a village in northwest Saskatchewan
- La Loche River (Saskatchewan), river in north west Saskatchewan
- Lac La Loche, a lake in northwest Saskatchewan
- Portage La Loche, historic fur-trade canoe portage in northwestern Saskatchewan

=== France ===
- Loché, an associated commune of Mâcon

=== Mexico ===
- Loché, Yucatán, a village in the Mexican state of Yucatán

== See also ==
- Deloche (disambiguation)
- Loches, a commune in central France
- Loché, an associated commune of Mâcon, France
- Loch (disambiguation)
