= Michael Hext =

British musician

- Born: 1961 (age 64–65)
- Occupation: Trombonist
- Instrument: Trombone
- Member of: Orchestra of the Royal Opera House

Michael Hext (born c. 1961) is a trombonist in the Orchestra of the Royal Opera House. In 1978 he was the inaugural winner of the BBC Young Musician of the Year Competition.

== Career ==
Michael Hext was educated at Bedford Modern School. In 1978, at the age of 17, he became the inaugural winner of the BBC Young Musician of the Year Competition. Following study at the Royal College of Music with John Iveson, Hext has become a successful orchestral trombonist but performs on occasions as a soloist, including a tour with the European Union Youth Orchestra conducted by Claudio Abbado. He has performed recitals and concertos at the Wigmore Hall, the Royal Festival Hall, the Queen Elizabeth Hall and many other concert halls. He has also had a number of pieces written for him including a concerto by Edward Gregson (pub. Novello).

Amongst a wide variety of freelance performances he played with the Philip Jones Brass Ensemble. In 1983 he joined the Halle Orchestra as Principal Trombone. After one year he took up the same position with the London Philharmonic Orchestra for nine years.

For a period Michael Hext was professor of trombone at the Royal Academy of Music and then the Royal College of Music. Since joining the Orchestra of the Royal Opera House on Principal Trombone he moved to Sub-principal Trombone in 2000.
