= Jess Gillam =

British musician and broadcaster (born 1998)

Jess Gillam MBE
- Born: 24 May 1998 (age 28); Ulverston, Cumbria, England
- Education: Guildhall School of Music and Drama
- Occupations: Saxophonist and BBC radio broadcaster

Jess Gillam MBE (born 24 May 1998) is a British saxophonist and BBC radio broadcaster from Ulverston, Cumbria. Gillam hosts This Classical Life on BBC Radio 3.

== Education ==
Gillam attended the Junior Royal Northern College of Music while at secondary school. She left sixth form early to concentrate on practising the saxophone and then attended the Royal Northern College of Music in Manchester but dropped out before completing her undergraduate course. During the coronavirus pandemic in 2020 she completed a Master's degree from Guildhall School of Music and Drama in London.

== Recognition ==
Gillam is the youngest ever presenter on BBC Radio 3 and the first saxophonist to be signed to Decca Classics Her debut album RISE reached No.1 in the UK Classical chart.

She was appointed Member of the Order of the British Empire (MBE) in the 2021 Birthday Honours for services to music.

== Albums ==
- Rise (2019)
- Christmas (2019)
- Time (2020)
- Shine (2026)

== Virtual Scratch Orchestra ==
During the COVID-19 pandemic, Gillam offered her fans the opportunity to participate in several virtual orchestras. This involved participants submitting videos of themselves performing individual parts on their chosen instrument. These were then edited, mixed and published on YouTube. The orchestras attracted participation of well over 500 entries on each occasion, and included the songs "Where Are We Now?", "Let It Be" and "Sleigh Ride".

== Awards ==
- Classic BRIT Award in Sound of Classical 2018
- Young Sounds UK Award (Previously Awards for Young Musicians (AYM))

== Notable performances ==
- BBC Young Musician of the Year, 2016
- Last Night of the Proms, 2018
