= Holyhead School =

Coordinates: 52.5050°N 1.9459°W

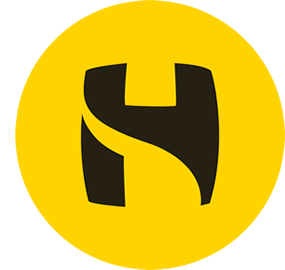

Location
- Milestone Lane; Handsworth; Birmingham, West Midlands, B21 0HN; England

Information
- Type: Academy
- Motto: "Engage, Enable, Educate"
- Local authority: Birmingham City Council
- Trust: Central Region Schools Trust
- Department for Education URN: 137034 Tables
- Ofsted: Reports
- Principal: Dave Knox
- Staff: >120
- Gender: Mixed
- Age: 11 to 18
- Enrolment: 1,300 as of March 2023
- Houses: Meriden, Edgeware, Oswestry, Corwen
- Colours: Navy, Red, Green, Light Blue
- Website: http://www.holyheadschool.org.uk/

Holyhead School is a mixed secondary school and sixth form located in the Handsworth area of Birmingham, in the West Midlands, England.

Previously a foundation school administered by Birmingham City Council, Holyhead School converted to academy status in August 2011. The school became part of the RSA Academies Trust in September 2014, but continues to coordinate with Birmingham City Council for admissions for its Year 7 intake. On 1 January 2021, Holyhead School joined Central Region Schools Trust.

In 2014, the school was described as "outstanding" by Ofsted, which stated that "achievement in mathematics has been consistently outstanding". The school's continuing achievements in Mathematics had also recently been further recognised when the department had been nominated for the "TES Maths department of the Year 2015/16" award.

Holyhead School offers GCSEs and BTECs as programmes of study for pupils, while students in the sixth form have the option to study from a range of A-levels and further BTECs.

In January 2017, long standing principal Martin Bayliss and colleague Amanda Cottam retired after 17 and 38 years teaching at the school respectively. After a long recruitment process, it was decided that the then Head of Key Stage 3, Ross Trafford, would be promoted to the role. When Holyhead joined Central Region Schools Trust, Dave Knox was made Head of School as Ross Trafford took on duties as Executive Principal at Holyhead & Gospel Oak.
