= Natalie Clein =

British classical cellist

- Born: Poole, Dorset, England
- Genre: Classical
- Instrument: Cello
- Years active: 1994–present
- Labels: EMI Classics, Hyperion
- Website: www.natalieclein.com

Natalie Clein OBE (born Poole, Dorset) is a British classical cellist. Her mother is a professional violinist. Her sister is the actress Louisa Clein.

== Early life and education ==
Clein started playing the cello at the age of six, and attended Talbot Heath School in Bournemouth, Dorset. She studied with Anna Shuttleworth and Alexander Baillie at the Royal College of Music where she was awarded the Queen Elizabeth the Queen Mother Scholarship. She has also studied with Heinrich Schiff in Vienna.

== Professional career ==
Clein came to prominence after winning the BBC Young Musician of the Year competition in 1994 with her performance of the Elgar Cello Concerto. She was the first British winner of the Eurovision Competition for Young Musicians in Warsaw, playing the Shostakovich Sonata and Elgar's concerto. Her other awards include the Ingrid zu Solms Cultur Preis at the 2003 Kronberg Academie and the Classical BRIT Award for Young British Performer of 2005.

Clein made her concerto debut at The Proms in August 1997, performing the Haydn Cello Concerto in C major with Sir Roger Norrington and the National Youth Chamber Orchestra of Great Britain.

In 1999 she was invited as one of the first artists to join the BBC Radio 3 New Generation Artists scheme. She is also a regular chamber musician with such musicians as Julius Drake, Charles Owen and Kathryn Stott, as well as the Belcea Quartet, Jerusalem Quartet, Takács Quartet, and the Nash Ensemble.

Clein has collaborated with author Jeanette Winterson on a performance piece which utilises Bach's Goldberg Variations in conjunction with Winterson's text. She has also worked with choreographer and dancer Carlos Acosta.

She records for Hyperion and has recorded the two Cello Concertos by Camille Saint-Saëns as well as Bloch's Schelomo and Bruch's Kol Nidrei with the BBC Scottish Symphony Orchestra to great critical acclaim as well as receiving a Diapason d’Or, BBC Critics Choice and Gramophone Choice awards . She has also recorded a solo disc with works by Bloch, Ligeti and Dallapiccola and the solo Kodaly sonata . She has previously released three discs for EMI. Her performances have taken Natalie Clein to orchestras including the Philharmonia, Hallé, Bournemouth Symphony, City of Birmingham Symphony, BBC National Orchestra of Wales, Montreal Symphony, Orchestre National de Lyon, New Zealand Symphony and Orquesta Filarmónica de Buenos Aires. She has performed with conductors including Sir Mark Elder, Sir Roger Norrington, Gennady Rozhdestvensky, Leonard Slatkin, Stéphane Denève and Heinrich Schiff.

She is a keen recital and chamber performer and has curated a series of concerts for BBC Radio 3 at LSO St Luke's.

She regularly works with contemporary composers such as Judith Weir, Thomas Larcher, Brian Elias, Charlotte Bray, Deborah Pritchard, Deidre Gribbin and Dobrinka Tabakova.

In 2015, Natalie Clein was appointed Artist in Residence at Oxford university for 4 years. She will curate a concert series in the context of this position.

She is Professor of cello at the HMT Rostock and appears regularly on international juries such as the Queen Elisabeth Competition in Brussels and the ARD Wettbewerb in Munich.

She is artistic director of the Purbeck International Chamber Music Festival (Dorset, UK).

She plays on the "Simpson" Guadagnini cello (1777).

Clein was appointed Officer of the Order of the British Empire (OBE) in the 2021 New Year Honours for services to music.

== Discography ==
- 1994: Duruflé: Requiem. Hyperion
- 2004: Brahms/Schubert: Cello Sonatas, with Charles Owen, piano. Classics for Pleasure
- 2006: Chopin/Rachmaninov: Cello Sonatas with Charles Owen, piano. EMI Classics UK
- 2007: Elgar: Cello Concerto with the Royal Liverpool Philharmonic Orchestra, Vernon Handley (conductor). EMI Classics UK
- 2009: Kodály: 'Sonata for Solo Cello, Adagio, Sonatina, Epigrams, Romance lyrique for cello & piano with Julius Drake, piano. Hyperion
- 2012: Bloch/Bruch: Schelomo, Kol Nidrei & other works with the BBC Scottish Symphony Orchestra, Ilan Volkov (conductor). Hyperion
- 2013: Saint-Saëns: Cello Concerto No.1, No.2 & other works with the BBC Scottish Symphony Orchestra, Andrew Manze (conductor). Hyperion
- 2017: Bridge, Clarke “ cello Sonatas “ with Christian Ihle Hadland . Hyperion
- 2019: Beethoven “Triple Concerto “ with Laurence Equilbey, Insular Orchestra, Conunova, Kadouch . Warner/Erato.
