= Purcell School for Young Musicians =

The Purcell School
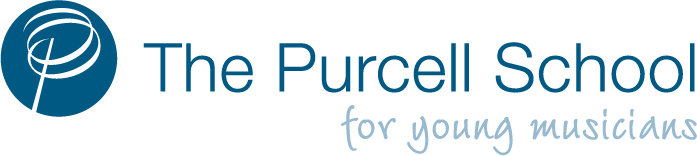

Location
- Aldenham Road; Bushey, Hertfordshire, WD23 2TS; England; 51.66083°N 0.367248°W

Information
- Type: Private day and boarding Specialist music school
- Established: 1962
- Founders: Rosemary Rapaport; Irene Foster
- Local authority: Hertfordshire County Council
- Specialist: Music College
- Department for Education URN: 102256 Tables
- Chairman: Sir Roger Jackling
- Principal: Paul Bambrough
- Gender: Mixed
- Age: 9 to 18
- Enrolment: ~180
- Website: www.purcell-school.org

The Purcell School for Young Musicians is a specialist private music school for children, located in the town of Bushey, south Hertfordshire, and is the oldest specialist music school in the UK. The school was awarded the UNESCO Mozart Medal in 2003, which was received on behalf of the school by Charles III, who is a patron of the school. Simon Rattle is honorary president of the school. In 2015, the School became the first Fazioli Pianoforti Centre of Excellence.

The School's pupils are funded largely by the Government's Music and Dance Scheme, along with the School's own scholarship funds.

== History ==
Rosemary Rapaport and Irene Forster founded the school in 1962 under the original name of the Central Tutorial School for Young Musicians, at Conway Hall in central London. The school later moved to Morley College, and subsequently to Hampstead, then to a large Victorian house in Harrow on the Hill.

The school changed its name in 1973 to The Purcell School (after composer Henry Purcell). In 1997, the school relocated to the site of the former Royal Caledonian School campus in Bushey, Hertfordshire.

== Notable former pupils ==
- Martin James Bartlett, BBC Young Musician of the Year 2014
- Katharine Blake, Kelly McCusker and Jocelyn West, vocalists and founder members of the a cappella ensemble Miranda Sex Garden
- Adiescar Chase, multi-instrumentalist and composer
- Daisy Chute, singer with classical-pop group All Angels
- Robert Cohen, cellist
- Jacob Collier, singer, arranger, composer, producer, and multi-instrumentalist
- Nicholas Daniel, oboist
- Anne Denholm, harpist, Official Harpist to the Prince of Wales 2015
- Julius Drake, pianist
- Catrin Finch, harpist
- Teo Gheorghiu, pianist and actor
- Sona Jobarteh Gambian vocalist, composer and multi-instrumentalist
- Oliver Knussen, composer and conductor
- Oliver Lewis, violinist
- Jack Liebeck, violinist
- Tirzah, singer-songwriter
- Lara Melda, BBC Young Musician of the Year, 2010
- Micachu, experimental composer and pop musician
- Leona Naess, composer, singer-songwriter
- Sarah Oates, violinist and associate leader Philharmonia orchestra
- Joseph Phibbs, composer
- Paul Sartin, oboist, violinist and singer with Bellowhead, and others
- Yevgeny Sudbin, pianist
- Yiruma, South Korean composer and pianist
