= Birgit Loch =

Australian mathematics educator and academic administrator

Birgit Ilka Loch is a German and Australian mathematician, scholar of mathematics education, and academic administrator, the Pro Vice-Chancellor, Learning & Teaching and the Institute of Education, Arts and Community at Federation University Australia. Her research expertise is in education technology for mathematics.

== Education and career ==
After a 1999 diploma in mathematics at the University of Essen in Germany, Loch continued her education in Australia, completing a Ph.D. in computational mathematics in 2004 at the University of Queensland. Her doctoral dissertation, Surface Fitting for the Modelling of Plant Leaves, was jointly supervised by John Belward and James Hanan.

She worked as a lecturer, senior lecturer, and Principal Advisor Learning and Teaching at the University of Southern Queensland, and then from 2010 to 2016 as Academic Director Digital Learning and Technologies and head of the Maths and Stats Help Centre at the Swinburne University of Technology. From 2017 until 2021 she was affiliated with the La Trobe University College of Science, Health and Engineering, as Chair of Teaching and Learning, associate pro vice chancellor for coursework, and deputy provost for learning and teaching. In 2021 she became dean of the Faculty of Science, Agriculture, Business and Law at the University of New England (Australia), and in 2024 she took her present position at Federation University Australia.

== Recognition ==
Loch is a Fellow of the Australian Mathematical Society. She was a recipient of the Australian federal government's 2016 Awards for Teaching Excellence in the physical and related sciences. In 2020 she received an Advance HE Principal Fellowship.
