= Martin James Bartlett =

English classical pianist

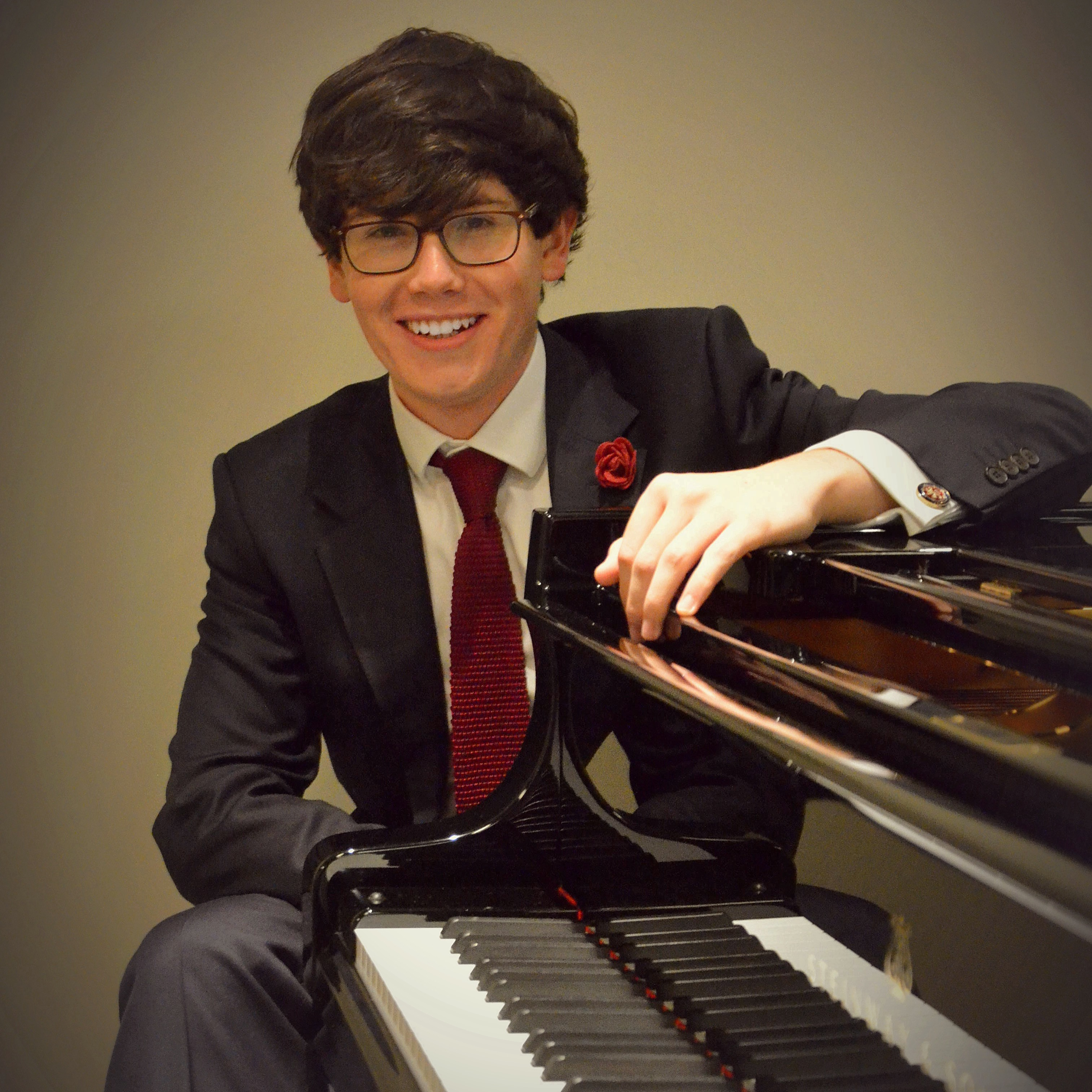

Background information
- Born: 20 July 1996 (age 30)
- Origin: Hornchurch, London, England
- Genre: Classical
- Instrument: Piano
- Years active: 2012–present
- Website: martinjamesbartlett.co.uk

Martin James Bartlett (born 1996) is an English classical pianist who has twice reached the keyboard finals of the BBC Young Musician of the Year contest, winning the competition in 2014.

== Education ==
From the year 2010, Bartlett was educated at The Purcell School for Young Musicians, a boarding and day specialist independent school in the town of Bushey in Hertfordshire.

== Life and career ==
Bartlett was born on 20 July 1996. He began his musical studies at the age of six, first with the piano and then two years later with bassoon and recorder. He appeared on the BBC Young Musician of the Year competition in 2012, at the age of 15, as a finalist in the keyboard category. At that time, he was studying for the GCE Advanced Level in music and physics. In 2014, he was again selected as a finalist in that category.

In October 2014 Bartlett was one of the musicians to record the "God Only Knows" charity single for BBC Children in Need, in collaboration with Nicola Benedetti, Stevie Wonder, Sam Smith, One Direction, Elton John, Emile Sandé, and others. The recording was broadcast on all BBC TV channels, received over 11 million hits on YouTube and also launched BBC Music.

In 2015 Bartlett was one of the youngest-ever soloists to debut at the BBC Proms, performing Gershwin's Rhapsody in Blue, with reviews in The Daily Telegraph and The Times praising his musical insight and maturity.

More recently Bartlett attended the 'Progress 1000' party hosted by the London Evening Standard celebrating London's most influential people. He was nominated as one of London's most influential musicians.

In 2018 Bartlett won the second prize and the audience prize of the piano competition Kissinger Klavierolymp (Kissingen Piano Olympics) in Germany.

Bartlett signed a recording contract with Warner Classics in 2019. The release of his debut album "Love and Death" with works of Prokofiev, Bach, Liszt, Schumann, Wagner and Granados was announced for May 2019.

On Wednesday 6 March 2019, Martin James Bartlett was awarded the Queen Elizabeth The Queen Mother Rosebowl by Prince Charles.
