= Lough (surname) =

Lough is a surname of Scottish or Irish origin, meaning lake or sea inlet. Notable people with the surname include:

== Arts and entertainment ==
- Adam Bhala Lough (born 1979), American film director and screenwriter
- Dorian Lough (born 1966), English actor
- Ernest Lough (1911–2000), English boy soprano ("O for the Wings of a Dove")
- Ida Lough (1903–1985), New Zealand tapestry maker
- John Graham Lough (1798–1876), English sculptor
- John Lough (1913–2000), English scholar of French literature and history, professor at Durham University
- Rodney Lough Jr. (born 1960), American wilderness photographer

== Military ==
- Frederick Charles Lough (1916–2002), U.S. Army brigadier general in Italy in World War II
- Maxon S. Lough (1886–1964), U.S. Army brigadier general in the Philippines in World War II

== Science ==
- Janice Lough, climate scientist at the Australian Institute of Marine Science
- Roger Lough, Chief Defence Scientist of Australia 2003–2008

== Sport ==
- David Lough (born 1986), American baseball player
- Gary Lough (born 1970), British middle distance runner
- Nicole Lough (born 1995), British Paralympic swimmer
- Peter Lough (born 1975), Canadian lacrosse player
- Tom Lough (born 1942), American pentathlete
- William Lough (1886–1939), Australian cricketer

== Other fields ==
- Lumley Lough (1832–1896), Archdeacon of Bermuda
- Thomas Lough (1850–1922), Irish-British politician; MP 1892–1918
- William H. Lough (1881–1950s), American economist

== See also ==
- Loch (surname)
