= Deloche =

Deloche may refer to:

== Surname ==
- Alain Deloche, (born 1940), French cardiac surgeon and founder of the Chain of Hope
- Campocasso (1833–1908), born Auguste Deloche, director of French theater
- Maximin Deloche (1817–1900), French historian and numismatist, member of the Société des Antiquaires de France
- Pierre Julien Deloche (born 1982), French archer
- Robert Deloche (1909–1988), furrier, trade unionist, politician in France and Algeria

== See also ==
- Loche (disambiguation)
- Loches, a commune in central France
- Loché, an associated commune of Mâcon, France
- Loch (disambiguation)
