= Forté Project =

Welsh artist development scheme

- Forte Project
- Founded: 2015
- Founder: Beacons Cymru
- Type: Music industry development
- Region served: Wales
- Website: www.forteproject.co.uk

Forté Project is an artist development scheme in Wales launched in 2015 by Beacons Cymru and Creative Wales.

Every year Forté Project supports several Welsh musicians at early stages in their career. The project is offered to those aged 16–25 for 6-months providing support, opportunities and industry development. Artists have received radio airplay and performances across the world.

== History ==
The Forté Project started in 2015. In 2021 parent company Beacons Cymru was formed with support from Creative Wales.

Until 2021, the Forté Project was only for artists based in South Wales. However, for their 2021 cohort of artists, the Forté Project became a Wales-wide scheme.

Forté Project's director is Spike Griffiths.

== Editions ==
=== 2023 ===
In January 2023, Forté Project announced 10 more artist for their eighth cohort of the scheme.

Forté Cohort 2023
Name	Hometown
ADJUA	Cardiff
Aisha Kigs
Elina Lee	Cardiff
ELIS	Wrexham
Francis Rees	Gwynedd
Half Happy
Ivor Woods
ManLikeVision	Newport
NOOKEE
Razkid	Cardiff

=== 2022 ===
In January 2022, Forté Project announced their seventh cohort of the scheme, Forté 7. The 10 successful artists include:

Forté 7
Name	Hometown
Artyshawty	Cardiff
Elin Grace	Llandrindod Wells
Elis Derby	Y Felinheli
Fig	Caerphilly
Kitty	Cardiff
Mali Hâf	Cardiff
Ogun	Newport
Only Rainyday Rainbow	Swansea
skylark	Caernarfon
sorry stacy	Cardiff

== Beacons Cymru ==
Forté Project is one of the many projects created by parent company, Beacons Cymru during its formation in 2021. Several other projects include the Honey Sessions, Crwth and Summit.
