= Alex Bone (musician) =

- Born: Darlington, England
- Genres: Electronic; pop; jazz; funk
- Occupations: Musician; record producer; composer
- Instruments: Saxophone; EWI
- Website: www.alexbone.uk

Alex Bone is a British multi-instrumentalist, record producer and composer, known for his blend of electronic music and jazz. He has gained recognition as both a saxophonist and a house music producer. Bone has worked with artists such as Disclosure, Nile Rodgers, and Tom Misch.

== Early life and education ==
Born and raised in Darlington, UK, Alex Bone displayed musical talent from a young age, playing piano at the age of two and saxophone at six, taught by his father. His early passion for dance music led him to start producing beats on a PlayStation game and collecting Ministry of Sound compilation albums.

He gained his first performance experience through busking, notably at the Edinburgh Fringe Festival. At age eleven, he received his first diploma (DipLCM) in saxophone and by eighteen, he had earned three more diplomas (ALCM, LLCM, FLCM). At thirteen, he attended Chetham's School of Music in Manchester studying jazz saxophone and jazz piano. He was later selected to attend the Brubeck Institute Summer Jazz Colony and moved to London in 2015 to study jazz saxophone at the Royal Academy of Music.

== Career ==
=== Early achievements ===
Alex Bone's career took off as a teenager. At 17, he won the inaugural BBC Young Musician Jazz Award, followed by the British Jazz Awards Rising Star, and the Kenny Wheeler Jazz Prize.

He also released house remixes under numerous aliases on labels including Spinnin' Records, Freemaison Records, and Parlophone Records.

=== Debut album ===
In July 2021, Bone released his debut album, "Falling on Infinity," featuring Nile Rodgers and Cory Wong. The album was well-received and gained significant media support, including being named Album of the Week on Jazz FM and receiving playlist placements on BBC 6 Music and editorial support from Spotify, Apple Music, and Amazon Music.

=== Recent work ===
Bone's remix of his own track "Adventure" was featured by Disclosure in their DJ sets, including at the F1 Grand Prix in Mexico.

Following the success of "Falling on Infinity", Bone has continued to produce and release new music. In 2023, he released singles "Look Back," "Queens," and "Favour," and the EPs The Greener Side and The Greener Side (The Remixes). In 2024, he released singles "Birthdays," "Don’t Overthink," "Reticence (feat. Elysia Biro)," "Cliché," and "Snog."

=== Collaborations and performances ===
Bone has collaborated with artists including Nile Rodgers, Rudimental, Cory Wong and Tom Misch. He has performed at renowned venues and events, such as the Royal Albert Hall (BBC Proms), BBC Proms in the Park, and sold out every show of his monthly residency at Ronnie Scott's in London in 2022. In 2025, Bone was featured on Think About, a single by American artist Shallou.

=== Social media and viral success ===
Bone has grown a strong presence on TikTok and Instagram. One of his saxophone solos went viral with more than 2 million views and was featured by Lad Bible.

== Brand endorsements ==
Bone has endorsements from D’Addario (US) and Yanagisawa Saxophones (Japan).

== Private performances ==
Alex Bone has performed at various prestigious venues and events, including the UK Houses of Parliament, for Queen Elizabeth II, Prince Edward, Earl of Wessex, and the England Men's Football squad at the Qatar World Cup 2022.

== Discography ==
=== Albums ===
- Falling on Infinity (2021)

=== EPs ===
- The Greener Side (2023)
- The Greener Side (The Remixes) (2023)
- Little Delights (2026)

=== Singles ===
- "In Dream" (feat. Nile Rodgers) – Uppermost Remix (2022)
- "Adventure" (feat. Cory Wong) – Alex Bone Remix (2022)
- "Look Back" (2023)
- "Queens" (2023)
- "Favour" (2023)
- "Birthdays" (2024)
- "Don't Overthink" (2024)
- "Reticence" (feat. Elysia Biro) (2024)
- "Cliché" (2024)
- "Snog" (2024)
- "Stuck" (2024)
- "Ooh" (2024)
- "Self Esteem" (2025)
- "So Good" (2025)
- "Think About" (2025)
- "Dream" (2025)
- "DNA" (2026)
