= Katherine Bryan =

British flautist (born 1982)

Katherine Bryan (born 1982) is a British flautist. She was appointed principal flute of the Royal Scottish National Orchestra in Spring 2003, at the age of 21.

== Career ==
Bryan was born in 1982 and educated at Chetham's School of Music in Manchester. In 1997 she won the Audi Young Musician competition, after performing the Nielsen concerto. She was a woodwind finalist in the BBC TV Young Musicians competition in 1998, 2000 and 2002.

Bryan studied at Juilliard School in New York from 2000 and graduated in 2003.

In 2001, Bryan debuted at the Lincoln Center playing Mozart's Flute concerto in G major with the Juilliard Symphony Orchestra. Bryan has performed with the New York Philharmonic Orchestra, the Nuremberg Symphony Orchestra, and performed at the Pacific Music Festival Orchestra in Japan. Bryan performed Mozart's Flute and harp concerto with the harpist Pippa Tunnell in the 2004 RSNO Scottish Power Proms, and in July 2004, she gave a solo flute recital at the Cheltenham International Festival.

In addition to her position with the RSNO, Bryan has performed as Guest Principal Flute with orchestras including the Halle, the Scottish Chamber Orchestra, the Northern Sinfonia, Royal Philharmonic Orchestra, London Philharmonic Orchestra and the London Symphony Orchestra.

Bryan is a lecturer of flute at the Royal Scottish Academy of Music and Drama.

In September 2015, Bryan released an album, Silver Bow, accompanied by the Royal Scottish National Orchestra conducted by Jac van Steen.

Katherine joined management agency Ikon Arts Management in March 2016.
