= Alexander Baillie =

English cellist

- Born: 6 January 1956 (age 70); Stockport, England
- Occupation: Cellist
- Instrument: Cello
- Website: alexanderbaillie.com

Alexander Baillie (born 6 January 1956) is an English cellist, recognised internationally as one of the finest of his generation. He is currently professor of cello at the Bremen Hochschule and previously taught at Birmingham Conservatoire, as well as at various summer schools in the UK and Europe. He is one of the main cello professors at the Cadenza Summer School, and also runs an annual cello summer course in Bryanston.

Baillie has worked as a concerto soloist all around the world. He has been a soloist at the BBC Proms numerous times, having performed the Schumann, Delius and Beethoven Triple Concertos, as well as various premieres of contemporary works. British Orchestras he has performed with include the London Symphony Orchestra, City of Birmingham Symphony Orchestra, BBC Symphony, Royal Philharmonic Orchestra and the National Youth Orchestra of Scotland. He has also directed and performed the Haydn and Boccherini concertos with the English Chamber Orchestra.

Baillie and his wife, the painter and former violinist Christel Baillie, are the parents of violinists and violists Max Baillie and Helena Baillie.

== Early life, education, and family ==
Alexander Baillie was born in Stockport, England on 6 January 1956. He grew up in St Albans at a home on Cunningham Hill Road. He was educated at Francis Bacon School, St Albans which he attended until he was sixteen years old. In his home town he was known by the nickname Sandy.

Baillie started learning the cello at the late age of twelve, after having been inspired by seeing Jacqueline du Pré perform. He advanced very quickly, and was soon playing in the National Youth Orchestra of Great Britain and the Hertfordshire County Youth Orchestra. He gained a place at the Royal College of Music (RCM) at the age of 16; studying cello with both Anna Shuttleworth and Joan Dickson, and music composition with Herbert Howells. He was a student at the RCM from 1972 to 1975.

In 1974 Baillie attended a summer music program in Siena, Italy where he was a student of André Navarra. After this he went to Austria to pursue further studies with Navarra at the Vienna Hochschule from 1975 to 1978. Other cellists he received tuition from included Pierre Fournier, Anthony Pleeth, Mstislav Rostropovich, and the cellist who had earlier been his inspiration, Jacqueline du Pré.

Baillie married violinist and painter Christel Wiehe; later known by her married name, Christel Baillie. Their twin daughters, Helena and Martina, were born in 1978. Their son, Maximillian, was born in 1981. The Baillie family lived for more than 30 years at their Cunningham Hill Road address in St Albans until temporarily moving to South London in February 1995 while Alexander was beginning his teaching career in Bremen, Germany. The family moved to Bremen not long after. Helena and Max Baillie followed their parents, and became professional violists and violinists. As of 2026 Helena teaches on the faculty at Bard College Conservatory of Music.

== Career ==
=== 1970s ===
Baillie made his concert debut in St. Albans in 1973 performing Edward Elgar's Cello Concerto; that same year winning the St. Alban's Young Music Award. In 1975 he was a featured soloist in the concert series given at the Chiswick School of Art (then Chiswick Polytechnic), and gave a recital at St. Alban's College. In 1976 he performed a chamber music concert at the Assembly House, Norwich which featured Britten's Cello Suite No. 3, Op. 87, and performed in a chamber music concert at St Albans Cathedral (SAC) in a program of music by Bach, Debussy, Handel, and Purcell. He returned to the SAC in 1977 to perform a concert with organist John Clough, and that same year gave a recital at St Albans School, Hertfordshire with a program that included Bach's Cello Suite No. 3.

In 1978 Baillie made his first appearance at Wigmore Hall; giving a recital with pianist William Howard which included Britten's Cello Suite No. 1, Op. 72 and Schubert's Arpeggione Sonata. That same year he played Boccherini's Cello Concerto No. 9 with the St. Albans Chamber Orchestra, performed a program with mezzo-soprano) Sarah Walker at the SAC, and performed as a member of Emanuel Hurwitz's chamber group Divertimenti in repertoire like Schubert's String Quintet and Zoltan Kodály's Duo for violin and cello. In November 1978 he was a soloist with Jan Latham-Koenig's Koenig Ensemble in a London concert at the Purcell Room (PR) featuring an all-Janáček program that included the Pohádka and Presto for cello and piano with Koenig as pianist. He returned to the PR in 1979 to give a recital.

In September 1978 Baillie was appointed Lesley Shrigley-Jones's successor as cellist for the Fires of London (FOL); a chamber group led by Peter Maxwell Davies. He was a member of this group through 1980; drawing particular notice for performing Davies's difficult cello part in Vesalii Icones from memory in a staged dance production in which he performed in character dressed as a medieval monk. He later returned as a guest performer with FOL to play this same work in 1982. In 1979 he was a guest soloist with the orchestra of the Royal Northern College of Music at Whitworth Hall with conductor Timothy Reynish. In February 1979 he was the soloist in Granville Bantock's Sapphic Poem with the Fulham Municipal Orchestra and conductor Joseph Vandernoot. The following month he performed a benefit concert with his wife at the Abbey Theatre, St. Albans to raise funds for Amnesty International.

In October 1979 he performed the Elgar Cello Concerto with the Bournemouth Symphony Orchestra led by George Hurst at Colston Hall; a concert resulting from his win of the bronze medal at the Bristol International Cello Festival competition (also known as the Imperial Tobacco Cello Competition), a prize awarded to him by Princess Michael of Kent. He also gave recitals in 1979 with pianist Tessa Uys.

=== Early 1980s ===
In 1980 Baillie won second prize in the International Pablo Casals Cello Competition held in Budapest. That same year he played Arthur Bliss's Cello Concerto with Ruth Gipps and the Chanticleer Orchestra at Queen Elizabeth Hall (QEH), and performed Tchaikovsky's Variations on a Rococo Theme with the Welwyn Garden City Music Society orchestra led by Krišs Rusmanis. In August 1980 he was a guest soloist with Jessye Norman in her recital at Wigmore Hall (WH) in which he accompanied her in a performance of Ravel's Chansons madécasses. He returned to the WH the following month to give his own recital there in a program that included Brahms' Cello Sonata No. 1 and Giovanni Valentini's Cello Sonata among other works.

In November 1980 Baillie recorded Strauss's Cello Sonata for broadcast on BBC Radio 3 with pianist and composer Margaret Lyell (then known as Julian Dawson-Lyell). He performed in multiple recitals with Lyell around this time. These included recital performances at WH (1980), St George's Church, Brandon Hill (1980), Church of St Margaret of Scotland, Twickenham (1981), and the Merlin Theatre, Frome (1981). After this he performed a prolific partnership with pianist Kathron Sturrock that included recital performances at Hull University (1981), Gawthorpe Hall (1981), University of East Anglia (1982), Leighton House (1982), QEH (1982), WH (1982 & 1983), the Amersham Concert Club (1982), University of Huddersfield (1983), the Dorset County Museum (1983), Kenwood House (1983), the Gardner Arts Centre (1983), and the University of Leicester (1983).

Baillie gave his first performance with the BBC Symphony Orchestra in 1981 playing Dutilleux's Tout un monde lointain under Mark Elder. He returned to the PR in April 1981 to perform a program with Sturrock that included André Jolivet's Nocturne and Prokofiev's Cello Sonata. By this time he was playing an 18th-century cello made by Bartolomeo Cristofori. In July 1981 he participated in a public masterclass filmed for BBC Two television with his teacher, Jacqueline du Pré. Later that year he repeated the Elgar concerto in concert with the Essex Symphony Orchestra, and performed a program of music by Berlioz, Saint-Saëns, and Hindemith with the BBC Scottish Symphony Orchestra.

In 1982 Baillie won top prize in the cello division of the ARD International Music Competition in Munich. By that time he was the cellist member of the Koenig Ensemble with whom he toured in chamber music concerts. He played the Dvořák Cello Concerto with the City of Southampton Orchestra led by Jonathan Del Mar in May 1982. In November 1982 he performed the UK premiere of Alfred Schnittke's Sonata No. 1 for cello and piano at QEH, and Frank Bridge's Oration with the Brighton Philharmonic Orchestra led by John Carewe. In 1983 he played Gordon Crosse's Cello Concerto with the Royal Liverpool Philharmonic (RLP) and conductor Charles Groves; was a guest soloist at the 12th annual International Organ Festival held at St Albans Cathedral; and performed the Schumann Cello Concerto with the Ulster Orchestra at Ulster Hall. Crosse composed his work for cello and piano Wavesongs for Baillie; a work he performed with Sturrock in his 1983 WH recital.

In November 1983 Baillie and Sturrock performed the world premiere of John Kefala-Kerr's Abstract No. 3 at the Huddersfield Contemporary Music Festival. In January 1984 he performed on the radio with the BBC Welsh Symphony Orchestra, and the following month he played a recital with pianist Michael Dussek recorded for BBC Radio 3. That same year he performed the Dvořák Cello Concerto with the RLP at Philharmonic Hall, Liverpool; reprised the Elgar concerto with the New Westminster Philharmonic Orchestra at the Barbican Centre, returned to WH to perform a recital with Kathryn Stott, and returned to QEH to give a recital with Piers Lane. In September 1984 he gave his first performance at the BBC Proms playing the world premiere of Colin Matthews's Cello Concerto with conductor David Atherton. That same year he played the Dvořák Cello Concerto under Atherton at Royal Albert Hall with the BBC Symphony Orchestra.

=== Late 1980s and early 1990s ===
In April 1985 Baille repeated the Dvořák Cello Concerto with Simon Rattle and the City of Birmingham Symphony Orchestra at the Lichfield Cathedral. In the summer of 1985 he toured to the United States with the London Symphony Orchestra (LSO) where he performed the Elgar Cello Concerto under Claudio Abbado at the Pepsico Summerfare festival held at State University of New York at Purchase. He repeated this work with the LSO in October 1986 with Andrew Litton conducting at Barbican Hall.

In March 1988 he gave his New York City recital debut at The Town Hall. The following September he returned to the BBC Proms to perform Hans Werner Henze's Sieben Liebeslieder in that work's UK premiere which was conducted by the composer. In July 1989 he returned to the BBC Proms to perform as the soloist in Tōru Takemitsu's Orion and Pleiades with the BBC Welsh Symphony Orchestra led by Tadaaki Otaka. (Note: Some sources such as Grove Music Online state that Baillie performed the premiere of this work. However, this is likely in error. The publication of the score for Orion and Pleiades by Schott Music explicitly states the cellist in the world premiere performance in Paris on May 27, 1984 was Tsuyoshi Tsutsumi. It is possible that the 1989 performance was the first performance in the United Kingdom of the work, which would explain the error in the literature.) He appeared at the BBC Proms again the following year, performing the Schumann Cello Concerto with the BBC Symphony under Marek Janowski.

In 1990 Baille performed the Dvořák Cello Concerto with the Kensington Symphony Orchestra and Malcolm Binney at the Jacqueline du Pré Memorial Fund Concert given at QEH. That same year he returned to New York to give a recital at Weill Recital Hall with Phillip Bush that featured Nikolai Myaskovsky's Cello Sonata No. 1 and Beethoven's Cello Sonata No. 3. In 1991 he performed Krzysztof Penderecki's Cello Concerto No. 2 with the Winnipeg Symphony Orchestra led by Bramwell Tovey; a work he repeated with the The National Youth Orchestra and conductor Andrew Mogrelia in January 1993. In February 1993 he performed the Walton Cello Concerto with the Royal Philharmonic Orchestra led by Alexander Gibson.

Baille performed H. K. Gruber's Cello Concerto with the Bournemouth Sinfonietta in March 1992. That same month he gave a recital at the Kennedy Center in Washington D.C. with pianist Mihae Lee. He returned to the QEH in July 1992 to give a recital with Martin Roscoe in which they performed the world premiere of Mark-Anthony Turnage's Sleep On; a work composed for Baillie. The following month Baillie and Roscoe performed the world premiere Richard Rodney Bennett's Sonata for Cello and Piano at the Harrogate Music Festival. In 1993 he returned to WH to perform with Gábor Takács-Nagy and Wu Han in trios by Beethoven and Dvořák.

In May 1993 Baille gave his first performance with the Boston Philharmonic (BP) and conductor Benjamin Zander performing Shostakovich's Cello Concerto No. 1 at Jordan Hall; a performance which was recorded and released on the Carlton Classics label. He later reunited with the BP and Zander in 1997 to perform Shostakovich's Cello Concerto No. 2. In 1994 he performed a recital at Smith Square Hall with Gordon Back.

=== Later career ===
In 1994 Baillie joined the teaching staff at the University of the Arts Bremen (UAB) after having previously taught for many years at both the Royal College of Music and the Royal Academy of Music. He became a full professor at the UAB in 1995. In 2013 Baillie was appointed International Chair in Cello at the Royal Birmingham Conservatoire (RBC). He was still in both teaching positions at the UAB and RBC as late as 2019. As of 2026, Baillie was still a professor at UAB but was no longer teaching at RBC. He was also working as a visiting professor at the Australian National Academy of Music in 2026. One of his notable pupils is cellist Natalie Clein.

Baille performed in the world premieres of two works by Andrew Paul MacDonald: Icarus (1996, at the Guelph Spring Festival with the pianist Marc-André Hamelin) and Free Flight, op. 40 (1997, with conductor Simon Streatfeild and the Manitoba Chamber Orchestra). In 1998 he performed a chamber music concert at the Bedford Corn Exchange with violinist Sigrún Eðvaldsdóttir and pianist James Lisney; later returning to that venue to perform a recital with Lisney in 2001. They subsequently performed together in concerts at St. George's Bristol (2001), Leighton House (2001), and Bush Hall (2001). In 2002 they performed all of Beethoven's cello sonatas in "The Beethoven Project" concert tour for performances across the United Kingdom and in the United States and Germany.

In October 2002 Baille performed the Dvořák Cello Concerto at the Worcester Music Festival, Massachusetts with the Boston Philharmonic (BP) and conductor Benjamin Zander; returned to the BBC Proms to perform the Schumann Cello Concerto under Marek Janowski; In 2003 he performed the Haydn Cello Concerto No. 1 with John Landor and the London Musical Arts Orchestra at the Academy of St Martin in the Fields, and reprised the Dvořák Cello Concerto with the Vancouver Symphony Orchestra and conductor Kazuyoshi Akiyama.

In 2005 Baille performed the United States premiere of Bridge's Oration at the Sanders Theatre, Harvard University with the BP and Zander, and in December of that year he performed the world premiere of Jan Vriend's Anatomy of Passion with Lisney during a recital they gave at Wigmore Hall (WH). In 2006 he was awarded an honorary doctorate from the University of Hertfordshire. That same year he performed the Schumann Cello Concerto with the BP and Zander. In January 2007 he performed Witold Lutosławski's Cello Concerto with the National Youth Orchestra of Scotland at Usher Hall. He later repeated the Lutosławski Cello Concerto with the BP and Zander in 2012. Twelve years later he performed the Elgar Cello Concerto with the BP and Zander in November 2024.

Baille gave further concerts with James Lisney at Riverhouse Barn Arts Centre (2007), WH (2007 & 2008) the Pittville Pump Room (2008), and Queen's University Belfast (2010). In 2016 he was the cello soloist in the world premiere of Robert Smedley's The Land of the Prince Bishops with Orchestra North East at the Durham Cathedral. In 2017 he was a guest soloist in concerts with the Gildas Quartet. In 2018 he gave a concert at the Barber Institute of Fine Arts with pianist John Thwaites that included James MacMillan's Cello Sonata No. 2. Thwaites grew up with Baillie in St. Albans (living on the same street), and the two have performed together many times.

Baillie has also taught masterclasses; including a masterclass sponsored by the Boston Philharmonic in 2024. He has also taught at summer music courses, including Cadenza International Summer School and the Bryanston International Cello Course in the South of England. While not a prolific composer, Baille's Rainforest Song was given its world premiere by the Marryat Players of Wimbledon in 2007 with Baillie conducting the ensemble. At the time Baillie was working as visiting music director of this chamber group. Baillie has been a recurring guest conductor of this ensemble of which his son, Max, was a founding member.

== Recordings ==
In 1981 Baillie made several recordings with pianist Kathron Sturrock for Meridian Records; including Robert Schumann's Fantasiestücke, Op. 73 and César Franck's Cello Sonata as crafted by Jules Delsart. His album, Britten: The Suites for Cello (1984, Etcetera Records; later re-issued on CD in 1993), featured recordings of Benjamin Britten's three solo cello suites. Alex Ross wrote the following in his review in The New York Times which compared Baillie's recording to that of Mstislav Rostropovich :

"Mr. Rostropovich's recording of the first two suites on London remains an invaluable document, but many other cellists have made a strong claim on this repertory. Perhaps the most successful is Alexander Baillie, a gifted English cellist relatively unknown in this country... It could be argued that Mr. Baillie's tone quality -- lucid, tense, more tenor than baritone -- somehow suits this music better than Mr. Rostropovich's broad, deep-throated sound. There is passion here but also isolation, an honest awkwardness, as private thoughts come into the open. Perhaps the Rostropovich touch is indispensable in the great double-stop "Canto" of the First Suite. But Mr. Baillie gives a more focused view of the introverted Second and a lyrically integrated interpretation of the difficult Third.".

Baillie recorded the Elgar Cello Concerto with Edward Downes and the BBC Philharmonic Orchestra (1989, Conifer Records). With violinist Ernst Kovacic and violist Gérard Caussé, Baille recorded Sir Michael Tippett's Triple Concerto with the composer leading the BBC Philharmonic Orchestra (1991, Nimbus Records). He recorded Gordon Crosse's Cello Concerto, Op. 44 with the BBC Symphony Orchestra under Martyn Brabbins (1999, NMC Recordings). This was followed soon after by a recording Alan Rawsthorne's Cello Concerto with David Lloyd-Jones and the Royal Scottish National Orchestra which was released by Naxos Records in 2000.

== See also ==
- List of English people
- List of cellists
