= András Mihály =

Hungarian composer

András Mihály [ˈɒndraːʃ ˈmihaːj] (6 November 1917 – 19 September 1993) was a Hungarian cellist, composer and academic teacher.

== Life ==
Mihály was born in Budapest. He studied there at the Franz Liszt Academy: cello with Adolf Schiffer, chamber music with Leó Weiner and Imre Waldbauer, and composition in private lessons with Pál Kadosa and István Strasser. In 1946, he was the principal cellist of the Budapest Opera and in 1950 a professor of chamber music at the Franz Liszt Academy. He then became a musical advisor for the radio (1962–1978). In 1967, he founded the Budapest Chamber Ensemble, dedicated to the repertoire of contemporary music, and from 1978 to 1987 he was the director of the Budapest Opera. He was notably the teacher of all four of the original members of the Takács Quartet: violinists Gábor Takács-Nagy and Károly Schranz, violist Gábor Ormai, and cellist András Fejér.

Mihály composed the opera Együtt és egyedül (Together and Alone, 1965–66), three symphonies (the last one 1962), a cello concerto (1963), a violin concerto, a piano concerto (1954), a concerto for wind quintet and orchestra (1955), Monodia for orchestra (1970), chamber works, piano pieces, choral music and lieder.

Mihály died in Budapest at age 75.

== Sources ==
- Vignal, Marc (2005). Dictionnaire de la musique (in French). Paris: Larousse. p. 653. ISBN 2-03-505545-8. OCLC 896013420.
