= Gábor Ormai =

Hungarian violist and educator

Gábor Ormai (1 September 1954 – 7 July 1995) was a Hungarian violist and educator who was most famous as a co-founder of the Takács Quartet in 1975; a group with which he toured widely in performance, made several recordings, and won multiple international awards up until just a few months before his death from cancer in 1995.

In 1982, the quartet became an ensemble in residence at the University of Colorado Boulder, and Ormai taught on the string faculty at that institution until his illness prevented him from continuing. Prior to forming the quartet, Ormai won second prize at the ARD International Music Competition as a solo violist.

== Early life and education ==
Born in the Hungarian People's Republic, Ormai studied piano, viola, and violin; and was trained at the Franz Liszt Academy of Music. There he gave a recital on all three instruments when he was 17 years old. His string teachers at the academy were cellist András Mihály and violinist Zoltán Székely. While a student, he won second prize at the ARD International Music Competition in Munich as a solo violist.

== Career ==
In 1975, Ormai cofounded the Takács Quartet with three of his fellow students: violinists Gábor Takács-Nagy and Károly Schranz, and cellist András Fejér. The quartet won first prize at both the International String Quartet Competition in Évian-les-Bains, France in 1977 and the Portsmouth International String Quartet in 1979.

In 1982 Ormai moved with his wife, Gyonge, from Hungary to Boulder, Colorado in the United States when the Takács Quartet became an ensemble in residence at the University of Colorado Boulder. While at the University of Colorado Boulder, Ormain maintained a busy international performance schedule with the Takács Quartet. The group recorded Bartok's six string quartets in 1984 with Hungaroton. In 1988 they recorded string quartets by Haydn for Decca's subsidiary London Recordings, and they made three recording for Decca Classics in 1990-1991.

He taught there until his diagnosis of terminal cancer just months before his death on July 7, 1995.

== Personal life ==
Ormai and his wife had one son together, and divorced in 1992. He was romantically involved with violinist Anna Schmidt in the latter part of his life.
