= Anna-Maria Helsing =

Finnish-Swedish conductor

Anna-Maria Helsing (born 17 October 1971, in Södertälje, Sweden) is a Finnish-Swedish conductor.

== Biography ==
Raised in a musical family, with a mother who played the piano and a father who played the violin, Helsing grew up in the former Finnish municipality of Munsala (now Nykarleby). Helsing studied music at the Jakobstad conservatory, and completed her violin teacher's degree there in 1992 and earned an additional degree in 1996. She continued her violin studies at the music conservatory in Jakobstad. Helsing furthered her music education in Poland at the Music Academy in Bydgoszcz, graduating in the spring of 2000 with honours.

From 2004 to 2007, Helsing studied in the conducting class of the Sibelius Academy with Leif Segerstam, Atso Almila, and Jorma Panula. She has also participated in conducting master classes with Vladimir Jurowski and John Carewe. She subsequently attended the International Conductor's Academy of the Allianz Cultural Foundation, where her conducting mentors included Esa-Pekka Salonen and Gustavo Dudamel.

Helsing was chief conductor of the Oulu Symphony Orchestra (Oulu Sinfonia) from 2010 to 2013, the first female conductor to hold the Oulu Sinfonia post, and the first female chief conductor of any Finnish orchestra. In November 2019, the BBC Concert Orchestra (BBC CO) announced the appointment of Helsing as its principal guest conductor, the first female conductor ever named to the post, and the third female conductor to be named to a titled post with a BBC orchestra. In 2020, Helsing became artistic director of the RUSK chamber music festival in Jakobstad, Finland.

In June 2023, the BBC CO announced the elevation of Helsing to the post of its chief conductor, effective 1 October 2023, with an initial contract through 2026. Helsing is the first female conductor to be named chief conductor of the BBC CO, the first female conductor to be named chief conductor of a BBC orchestra, and the second female conductor to be named chief conductor of a BBC music ensemble. In December 2023, the Vaasa City Orchestra announced the appointment of Helsing as its next chief conductor, the first female conductor to be named to the post, with an initial contract from 2025 to 2028.

Cultural offices
Preceded by Dima Slobodeniouk	Chief Conductor, Oulu Symphony Orchestra; 2010–2013	Succeeded by Johannes Gustavsson
Preceded by Bramwell Tovey	Principal Conductor, BBC Concert Orchestra; 2023–present	Succeeded by incumbent
Preceded by Tomas Djupsjöbacka	Chief Conductor, Vaasa City Orchestra; 2025–present	Succeeded by incumbent
