= Roberto González-Monjas =

- Born: February 23, 1988 (age 38); Valladolid, Spain
- Genre: Classical music
- Instrument: Violin
- Years active: 2008–present
- Labels: Sony Classical; Claves Records

Roberto González-Monjas (born February 23, 1988, in Valladolid, Spain) is a Spanish conductor and classical violinist. He is chief conductor of three orchestras — Orchester Musikkollegium Winterthur (since 2021), Orquesta Sinfónica de Galicia (since 2023), and Mozarteum Orchestra Salzburg (since 2024).

== Education ==
He studied at the Mozarteum University of Salzburg with Igor Ozim and at the Guildhall School of Music and Drama in London with David Takeno. He has been very much influenced by musical contact with Ferenc Rados, Ana Chumachenco, Rainer Schmidt, Sergey Fatkulin, Reinhard Goebel, Mark Stringer, Gábor Takács-Nagy, the Hagen Quartet, András Schiff and John Corigliano.

== Conductor ==
From 2019 to 2023, Roberto González-Monjas served as Chief conductor of the Dalasinfoniettan in Falun, Sweden, after which the orchestra named him Honorary Conductor in recognition of his tenure.

In July 2020, the Musikkollegium Winterthur appointed Roberto González-Monjas as their new Chief Conductor. In February 2026, González-Monjas announced his departure from the Swiss institution, effective June 2027.

The Orquesta Sinfónica de Galicia made it known in October 2022 that González-Monjas would become its next Chief Conductor, starting in August 2023.

In March 2023, it was announced that González-Monjas would become the next Chief Conductor of the Mozarteum Orchestra Salzburg, beginning in September 2024.

The Orchestre de Paris named González-Monjas their very first Principal Guest Conductor in May 2026, starting in the season 2027/28 for a minimum of four years.

González-Monjas served as Principal Guest Conductor of the Belgian National Orchestra from 2021 until 2025. He has also conducted orchestras such as Los Angeles Philharmonic, Orchestre de Paris, Oslo Philharmonic, Hong Kong Philharmonic Orchestra, Swedish Radio Symphony Orchestra, Orchestre National du Capitole de Toulouse, Orquesta Nacional de España, Baltimore Symphony Orchestra, Mahler Chamber Orchestra and Berliner Barock Solisten.

He is also deeply engaged with the music written by living composers, having premiered works and worked closely with composers such as Richard Dubugnon, Andrea Tarrodi, Anders Hillborg, Diana Syrse, Thierry Escaich, Hannah Kendall, and Edmund Finnis, among others.

== Violinist ==
He appears regularly as a soloist, often directing orchestras from the violin for classical repertoire, but also performing post-romantic and contemporary works such as Szymanowski, Vaughan Williams, Karl-Amadeus Hartmann and Esa-Pekka Salonen. In May 2018 he premiered "Colorfields", Violin Concerto No. 2 written and dedicated to him by composer Richard Dubugnon.

While his usual recital partner is Kit Armstrong, he also played with pianists Alexander Lonquich, Yuja Wang and Louis Schwizgebel, as well as appearing in chamber music formations at the Verbier Festival, Kammermusikfest Lockenhaus and Bürgenstock Festival.

From 2013 to 2021, González-Monjas was the concertmaster of the Orchester Musikkollegium Winterthur, a position he also held at the Orchestra dell'Accademia Nazionale di Santa Cecilia in Rome from 2014 until July 2020.

== Teacher and educator ==
Roberto González-Monjas is the co-founder and artistic director of Iberacademy in Medellín, Colombia, a non-profit organisation which aims at creating an efficient and sustainable model of musical education in Latin America, focusing on vulnerable segments of the population and supporting highly talented young musicians. He also works with other educational institutions such as Sinfonía por el Perú and the Verbier Festival junior orchestra in Switzerland. He is a violin professor at the Guildhall School of Music and Drama in London.

== Instrument ==
He plays a Giuseppe Guarneri ‘filius Andreae’ violin from around 1710. Its purchase was made possible thanks to five families from the city of Winterthur and the Rychenberg Foundation. He also owns a violin made by Stephan von Baehr in 2011.

== Discography ==
Together with the Musikkollegium Winterthur, he has released albums featuring music by Wolfgang Amadeus Mozart, C.P.E. Bach, and Sergei Prokofiev, as well as a triptych of recordings presenting Mozart's last three symphonies alongside works by Andrea Tarrodi, Diana Syrse, Hannah Kendall, Josef Haydn, Michael Haydn, and Ludwig van Beethoven.

Following his debut recording with the Mozarteum Orchester Salzburg — which included Mozart's Colloredo Serenade and Serenata Notturna — Berlin Classics released a recording of Mozart's complete violin concertos in January 2026.

He also contributed to Reinhard Goebel's recording of Johann Sebastian Bach′s Brandenburg Concerti with the Berliner Barocksolisten for Sony Classical.
