= Manchester Orchestra (disambiguation) =

Manchester Orchestra is an indie rock band from Atlanta, Georgia, United States.

"Manchester Orchestra" may also refer to any of the following orchestras based in Manchester, United Kingdom:

- The Manchester Camerata, chamber orchestra
- The Hallé, symphony orchestra
- The BBC Philharmonic, symphony orchestra
