= Dima Slobodeniouk =

Russian conductor

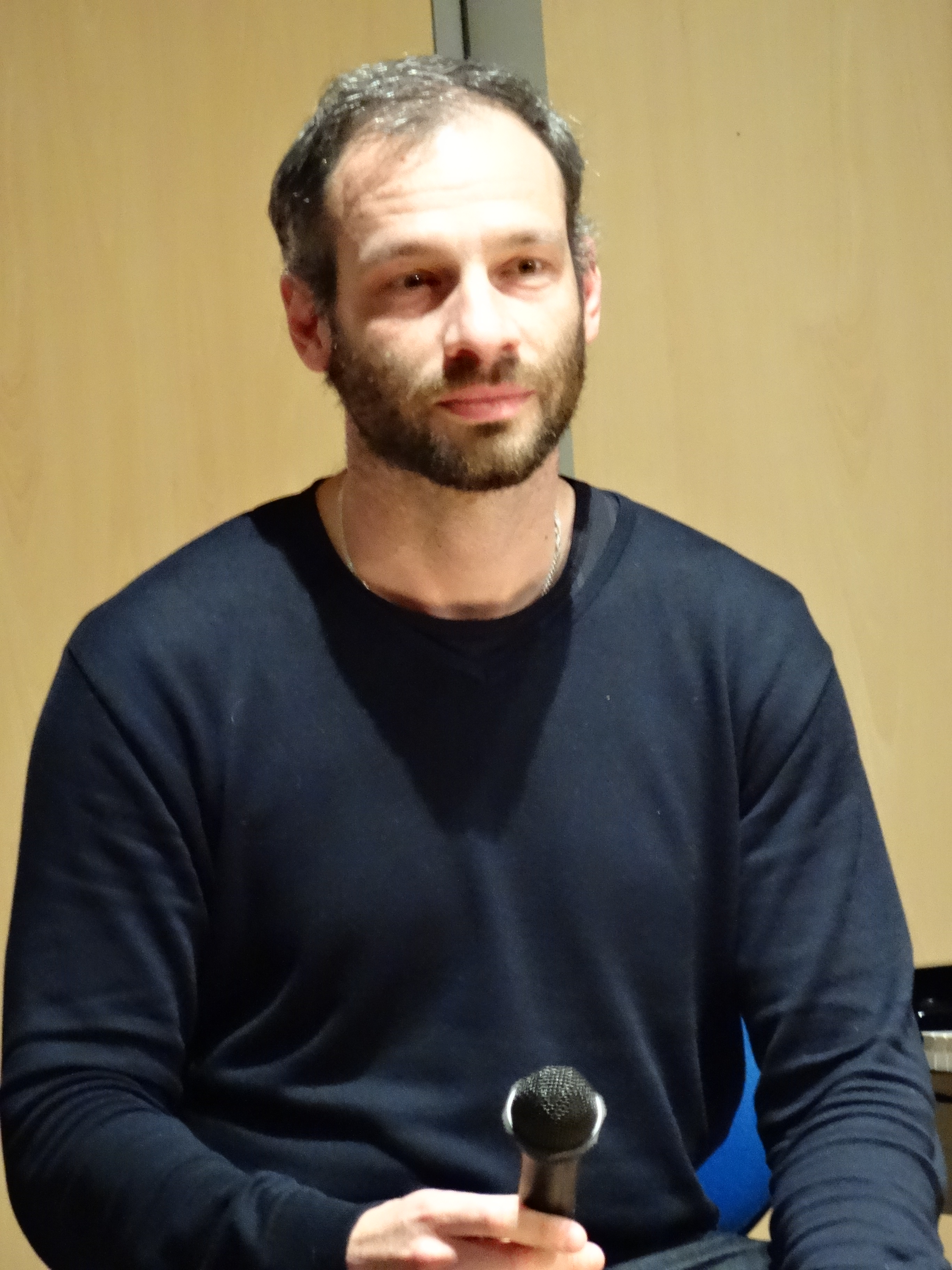
- Dima Slobodeniouk in 2016
- Born: 1975 (age 50–51); Moscow, USSR
- Occupation: Conductor
- Years active: 2004–present

Dima Slobodeniouk (Димa Слободенюк; born 1975) is a Russian-born Finnish conductor.

== Early years ==
Slobodeniouk was born in Moscow. As a youth, Slobodeniouk began his violin studies from 1980 to 1989, at the Moscow Central Music School, where his teachers included Zinaida Gilels. He settled in Finland at age sixteen. Slobodeniouk continued his violin studies at the Conservatory of Central Finland and the Sibelius Academy. He was also in the conducting class of the Sibelius Academy, where his teachers included Leif Segerstam, Jorma Panula and Atso Almila.

== Career ==
Slobodeniouk was principal guest conductor of the Kymi Sinfonietta from 2004 to 2006. From 2005 to 2008, he was chief conductor of the Oulu Symphony Orchestra (Oulu Sinfonia). He was artistic director of the Korsholm Music Festival in 2007 and in 2009.

In November 2012, Slobodeniouk first-guest conducted the Orquesta Sinfónica de Galicia (OSG). On the basis of this appearance, in February 2013, the OSG named Slobodeniouk its next principal conductor, effective from the 2013–2014 season. In March 2015, the OSG extended his initial contract through 2019. In July 2018, the OSG and Slobodeniouk agreed on a further extension of his OSG contract through 2022.

Slobodeniouk became chief conductor of the Lahti Symphony Orchestra (Sinfonia Lahti) as of the 2016–2017 season. In April 2016, his initial Lahti contract was extended through 2021. He concluded his chief conductorship of Sinfonia Lahti at the close of the 2020–2021 season. In May 2026, Finnish National Opera and Ballet announced the appointment of Slobodeniouk as its next principal conductor, with an initial contract of four years, from 1 August 2026 through 31 July 2030.

Slobodeniouk's commercial recordings include an album of works by Lotta Wennäkoski (with the Finnish Radio Symphony).

Cultural offices
Preceded by Arvo Volmer	Chief Conductor, Oulu Sinfonia; 2005–2008	Succeeded by Anna-Maria Helsing
Preceded by Víctor Pablo Pérez	Principal Conductor, Orquesta Sinfónica de Galicia; 2013–present	Succeeded by incumbent
Preceded by Okko Kamu	Chief Conductor, Lahti Symphony Orchestra; 2016–2021	Succeeded by Dalia Stasevska
Preceded by Hannu Lintu	Principal Conductor, Finnish National Opera and Ballet; 2026–present	Succeeded by incumbent
