= Edward Dusinberre =

British violinist

Edward Dusinberre (born 1968 in Leamington Spa, England) is a British/American violinist. He is the first violinist of the Takács Quartet and Artist in Residence at the University of Colorado Boulder. He is the author of Beethoven for a Later Age: The Journey of a String Quartet (2016)

== Biography ==
Edward Dusinberre studied with the Ukrainian violinist Felix Andrievsky at the Royal College of Music and with Dorothy DeLay and Piotr Milewski at the Juilliard School. In 1990 he won the British Violin Recital Prize and gave his debut recital in London in the Purcell Room of South Bank Centre. He joined the Takács Quartet in 1993. Dusinberre is the first violinist of the Takács Quartet and Artist in Residence at the University of Colorado Boulder. His first book, Beethoven for a Later Age: The Journey of a String Quartet (2016) won a Royal Philharmonic Society Award in the Creative Communication category. His second book, Distant Melodies: Music in Search of Home was published by Faber and Faber and the University of Chicago Press in November 2022.

== Performances and recordings ==
Based in Boulder at the University of Colorado, the Takács Quartet performed ninety concerts a year worldwide, throughout Europe as well as in Australia, New Zealand, Japan and South Korea. The Quartet's recordings include the complete Beethoven String Quartets on the Decca label. Their recordings of the early and middle Beethoven quartets won a Grammy Award, a Gramophone Award, a Chamber Music of America Award and two awards from the Japanese Recording Academy. In 2005, their recording of the Late Beethoven Quartets won "Disc of the Year" and "Chamber Award" from BBC Music Magazine, a Grammy and a Japanese Record Academy Award. Since 2005 the Takács Quartet has recorded for the Hyperion label, making critically acclaimed recordings of Schubert, Brahms, Schumann, Franck, Debussy, Haydn, Janáček, Fanny Hensel and Felix Mendelssohn, amongst others. The group's recording of piano quintets by Elgar and Beach won a Gramophone Award in 2021.

Dusinberre regularly performs as a recitalist and concerto soloist. He has recorded Kreutzer Sonata and Opus 96 for the Decca label with pianist David Korevaar.

== Teaching and writing ==
With his Takács Quartet colleagues, Dusinberre teaches at the University of Colorado, Boulder. Dusinberre is a member of the faculty at the Music Academy of the West, Montecito and a visiting fellow of the Guildhall School of Music.

Dusinberre writes about music. In addition to his two books, he wrote an essay "A Winter Drive" for "Ways of Hearing: Reflections on Music in 26 Pieces", published by Princeton University Press in 2021. He has written articles for the Financial Times, Los Angeles Times, Radio Times, The Strad, Massachusetts Review and The Guardian.

== Interdisciplinary programming ==
Dusinberre is well known for his innovative program ideas, devising amongst others a project with the poet Robert Pinsky that toured throughout the US, mixing love poetry with the music of Janáček, Britten and Barber. In 2007, he created a program called Everyman inspired by Philip Roth's novel of that name. Philip Seymour Hoffman read extracts from the novel, surrounded by the music of Arvo Pärt and Philip Glass and concluding with a performance of Schubert's Death and the Maiden.

A collaboration with writer David Lawrence Morse led to Morse's play Quartet, a drama that explores the circumstances surrounding the composition of Beethoven's Late Quartets.
