= Orchester Musikkollegium Winterthur =

Orchestra

- Orchestra
- Former name: Stadtorchester Winterthur
- Founded: 1875; 150 years ago
- Location: Winterthur, Switzerland
- Concert hall: Musikkollegium Winterthur
- Principal conductor: Roberto González-Monjas
- Website: Official website

The Orchester Musikkollegium Winterthur is a Swiss symphony orchestra based in Winterthur, Switzerland at its namesake venue, the Musikkollegium Winterthur. The orchestra performs around 60 concerts a year, and in addition to orchestra concerts, performs in the pit at the Zurich Opera.

== History ==
The oldest orchestra in Switzerland, the orchestra was founded in 1875 as the Stadtorchester Winterthur. The Musikkollegium itself, as an organisation based out of religious roots to that time, was founded in 1629.

From 2002 to 2008, Jac van Steen was principal conductor of the orchestra. The orchestra and van Steen made several commercial recordings for the MDG label, including music of the composers of the Second Viennese School and of Frank Martin. In April 2008, the orchestra announced the appointment of Douglas Boyd as its next principal conductor, effective with the 2009–2010 season. Boyd concluded his tenure as principal conductor after the 2015–2016 season. In June 2015, the orchestra announced the appointment of Thomas Zehetmair as its next principal conductor, effective September 2016, with an initial contract of three seasons. Zehetmair is scheduled to conclude his Winterthur tenure at the close of the 2020–2021 season. In July 2020, the orchestra announced the appointment of Roberto González-Monjas, first concertmaster (leader) of the orchestra since the 2013–2014 season, as its next principal conductor, effective with the 2021–2022 season, with an initial contract of 4 years.

In May 2020, the orchestra announced the appointment of Dominik Deuber as its next managing director, effective August 2020.

In the modern repertoire, the orchestra has often worked with Heinz Holliger, and in the Baroque repertoire with Maurice Steger and Nicholas Kraemer. With Boyd as conductor, the orchestra has made commercial recordings of music of Wolfgang Amadeus Mozart, Felix Mendelssohn, Josef Rheinberger and Ralph Vaughan Williams. The orchestra has made other commercial recordings with Holliger, and other conductors such as Werner Andreas Albert.

== Principal conductors ==
- Franz Welser-Möst (1987–1990)
- János Fürst (1990–1994)
- Heinrich Schiff (1995–2001)
- Jac van Steen (2002–2008)
- Douglas Boyd (2009–2016)
- Thomas Zehetmair (2016–2021)
- Roberto González-Monjas (2021–present)
