= Víctor Pablo Pérez =

Spanish conductor (born 1954)

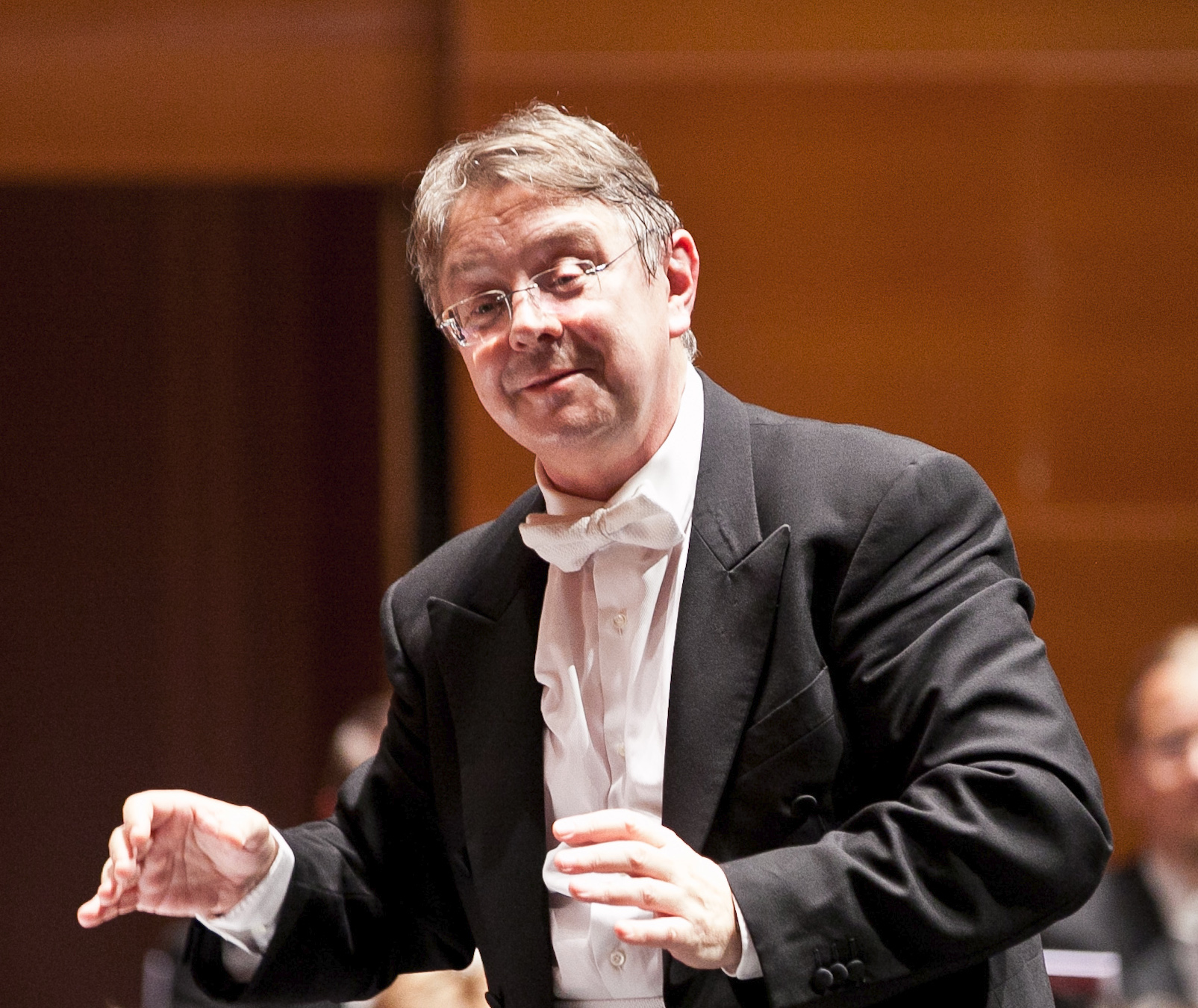
Víctor Pablo Pérez

Víctor Pablo Pérez (born 1954, Burgos) is a Spanish conductor known for specializing in zarzuelas.

He was principal conductor and artistic director of the Symphony Orchestra of Asturias 1980-1988, and then of the Orquesta Sinfónica de Tenerife.

== Discography ==
- Francisco Barbieri: El barberillo de Lavapiés
- Gonzalo Roig: es:Cecilia Valdés

Cultural offices
| Preceded by (no predecessor) | Principal Conductor, Orquesta Sinfónica de Galicia; 1993–2013 | Succeeded by Dima Slobodeniouk |
