= Thomas Zehetmair =

Austrian violinist and conductor

Thomas Zehetmair (born 23 November 1961) is an Austrian violinist and conductor.

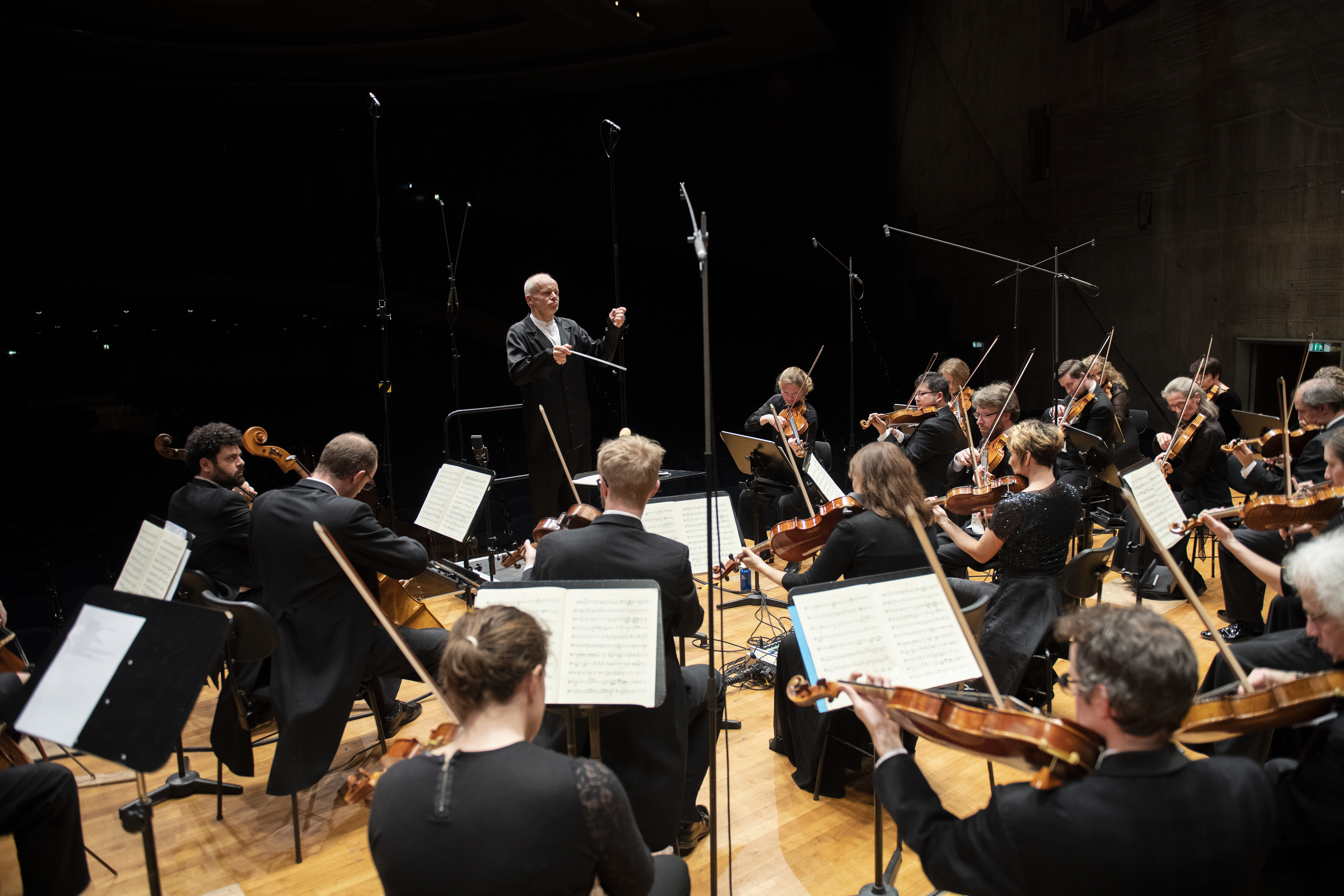
Zehetmair, Stuttgarter Kammerorchester, 2020

== Biography ==
Zehetmair was born in Salzburg, and studied at the Salzburg Mozarteum, where both of his parents taught. His festival debut was at age 16. He was in master classes with Nathan Milstein and Max Rostal.

In 1994, Zehetmair formed a string quartet which bears his name. The Zehetmair Quartet performs all works entirely from memory, and learns one new programme a year. Zehetmair has made several recordings for ECM, both as soloist and with his quartet.

Zehetmair later developed a parallel career in conducting. In November 2001, he was named music director and chief conductor of the Northern Sinfonia (now the Royal Northern Sinfonia), his first conducting post, starting with the 2002–2003 season, for an initial contract of 3 years and 6 weeks of concerts each season. In August 2005, he extended his contract for another 3 years through 2008. He concluded his music directorship of the Royal Northern Sinfonia after the 2013–2014 season, and now has the title of conductor laureate with the orchestra. He became an Artistic Partner of the Saint Paul Chamber Orchestra in Minnesota in 2010. In June 2015, the Orchester Musikkollegium Winterthur announced the appointment of Zehetmair as its next principal conductor, effective September 2016, with an initial contract of 3 seasons. He is scheduled to conclude his Winterthur tenure at the close of the 2020–2021 season.

In October 2017, the Stuttgart Chamber Orchestra announced the appointment of Zehetmair as its next chief conductor, effective with the 2019–2020 season, with an initial contract of 3 years. In March 2021, the Orchestre national d'Auvergne announced the appointment of Zehetmair as its next principal conductor, effective with the 2021–2022 season, with an initial contract of 3 years. Since May 2022, he has been Principal Conductor and Artistic Partner of the Irish Chamber Orchestra.

Zehetmair is married to the violist Ruth Killius, who is also a member of the Zehetmair Quartet. He holds honorary doctorates from the Music Academy Franz Liszt in Weimar and Newcastle University.

Cultural offices
Preceded by Jean-Bernard Pommier	Music Director, Northern Sinfonia; 2002–2014	Succeeded by Lars Vogt
Preceded by Douglas Boyd	Principal Conductor, Orchester Musikkollegium Winterthur; 2016–present	Succeeded by incumbent
Preceded by Matthias Foremny	Chief Conductor, Stuttgart Chamber Orchestra; 2019–present	Succeeded by incumbent
Preceded by Jörg Widmann	Principal Conductor, Irish Chamber Orchestra; 2022–present	Succeeded by incumbent
