= Marcus Dods (musician) =

Scottish composer (1918–1984)

Marcus Dods (19 April 1918 in Edinburgh – 30 April 1984 in Henley-on-Thames), was a Scottish musician and composer. He was educated at Rugby School, King's College, Cambridge, where he won a choral scholarship, and later graduated from the Royal Academy of Music. He played rugby union at school and university and represented Cambridge University R.U.F.C. in The Varsity Match in December 1938.

Dods was assistant music director in the Rank Organisation 1947–1951, where he assisted Muir Mathieson. He worked with Mathieson on the soundtrack recording of William Walton's score for Laurence Olivier's Hamlet in 1948. Although a composer in his own right, he was better known as an arranger and conductor. Dods was the conductor and chorus master for Sadler's Wells Opera Company (now the English National Opera) from 1952 to 1956. In 1966, he became chief conductor of the BBC Concert Orchestra, a post he held until 1970. In 1972 he became the musical director of the London Concert Orchestra, a post he held until his death in 1984. As a musical director, he worked on such films as Far from the Madding Crowd (1967), Nicholas and Alexandra (1971), Lady Caroline Lamb (1972), Murder on the Orient Express (1974) and Watership Down (1978). His television work included Life on Earth, Doctor Who and The Forsyte Saga.

Recordings with Dods as conductor include Malcolm Williamson's The Happy Prince on Argo (with the Academy of St Martin in the Fields), Lionel Bart's Oliver! original cast recording for Decca Records, and "British Music for Film & Television" with the City of Birmingham Symphony Orchestra for EMI. Dods' short composition Highland Fancy has been recorded for ASV Records.

Preceded by Vilém Tauský	Principal Conductor, BBC Concert Orchestra; 1966–1970	Succeeded by Ashley Lawrence
