= BBC Concert Orchestra =

British orchestra

- Orchestra
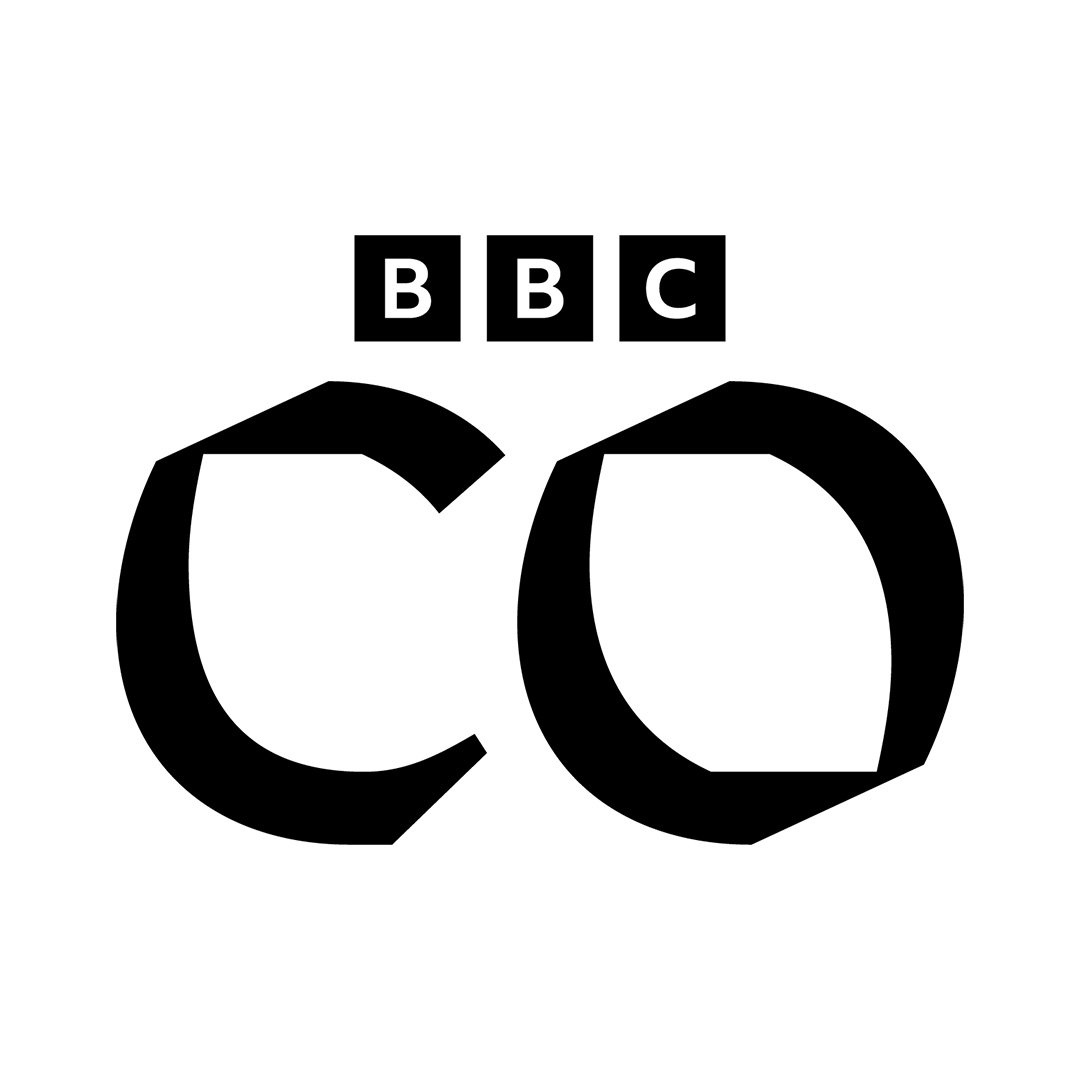
- Official logo
- Short name: BBC CO
- Former name: BBC Theatre Orchestra (1931); BBC Opera Orchestra (1949)
- Founded: 1952; 74 years ago
- Location: London, United Kingdom
- Principal conductor: Anna-Maria Helsing
- Website: bbc.co.uk/concertorchestra

The BBC Concert Orchestra is a British concert orchestra based in London, one of the British Broadcasting Corporation's five radio orchestras. With around fifty players, it is the only one of the five BBC orchestras which is not a full-scale symphony orchestra. The BBC Concert Orchestra is the BBC's most populist ensemble, playing a mixture of classical music, light music and popular numbers. Its primary role is to produce music for radio broadcast, and it is the resident orchestra of the world's longest-running live music programme, Friday Night Is Music Night on BBC Radio 3.

== History ==
The parent ensemble of the orchestra was the BBC Theatre Orchestra, which was formed in 1931 and based in Bedford. The orchestra also did opera work and was occasionally billed as the BBC Opera Orchestra. Stanford Robinson was the principal conductor from 1931 until 1946, but others included Walter Goehr, Spike Hughes, Harold Lowe, Mark Lubbock and Lionel Salter. In August 1949, the ensemble was formally renamed the BBC Opera Orchestra. In January 1952, the BBC Opera Orchestra was disbanded and the BBC Concert Orchestra was formed from its players.

Until 1972, the orchestra was based at the Camden Theatre. From 1972 to 2004, the orchestra performed regularly at the Golders Green Hippodrome. It also appears regularly at the Royal Festival Hall and The Proms in London, as well as venues around the United Kingdom. As well as its performances on BBC Radio 2, it also performs on BBC Radio 3 and the BBC Proms and was a core part of the BBC's Electric Proms, now discontinued. As well as light classical music, it also plays pop music, jazz, opera, operetta and much of the popular repertoire previously the mainstay of the disbanded BBC Radio Orchestra. It links, from time to time, with the BBC Big Band for concerts and broadcasts.

=== Conductors ===
Gilbert Vinter served as its first principal conductor. Barry Wordsworth, principal conductor from 1989 to 2006, now holds the title of Conductor Laureate. In August 2010, the orchestra announced the simultaneous appointments of Keith Lockhart as its seventh principal conductor, with immediate effect, and of Johannes Wildner as principal guest conductor. Lockhart concluded his principal conductorship of the orchestra at the end of 2017, and subsequently took the title of chief guest conductor. In November 2017, the orchestra announced the appointment of Bramwell Tovey as its next principal conductor, effective January 2018, with an initial contract of five years. Tovey served as principal conductor until his death on 12 July 2022.

In November 2019, the BBC CO announced the appointment of Anna-Maria Helsing as its next principal guest conductor, the first female conductor ever named to the post, and the third female conductor to be named to a titled post with a BBC orchestra. In June 2023, the BBC CO announced the appointment of Helsing as its next chief conductor, effective 1 October 2023, with an initial contract of three seasons. Helsing is the first female conductor to be named chief conductor of the BBC CO, the first female conductor to be named chief conductor of a BBC orchestra, and the second female conductor to be named chief conductor of a BBC music ensemble.

In March 2024, the BBC Concert Orchestra announced the appointment of Matthew Swann as its next Director, in succession to Bill Chandler, effective 27 March 2024. In June 2024, the orchestra announced the appointment of Edwin Outwater as its next principal guest conductor, effective 1 September 2024.

=== Composers ===
Composers who have been affiliated with the orchestra have included Anne Dudley and Jonny Greenwood, who was named the orchestra's composer-in-association in 2004. In January 2013, the orchestra announced the appointment of Guy Barker as its new Associate Composer, replacing Greenwood, with an initial contract of two years. From 2017 until 2023 Dobrinka Tabakova was the BBC CO's Composer-in-Residence.

=== Recordings ===
The orchestra has recorded commercially for the NMC Recordings label.

== Principal conductors ==
- Gilbert Vinter (1952–1953)
- Charles Mackerras (1954–1956)
- Vilém Tauský (1956–1966)
- Marcus Dods (1966–1970)
- Ashley Lawrence (1970–1989)
- Barry Wordsworth (1989–2006)
- Keith Lockhart (2010–2017)
- Bramwell Tovey (2018–2022)
- Anna-Maria Helsing (2023-2029)
