= Jean-Bernard Pommier =

French pianist and conductor (1944–2026)

- Pommier in the 1980s
- Born: 17 August 1944; Béziers, South Zone, German occupied France
- Died: 23 April 2026 (aged 81); Boujan-sur-Libron, France
- Education: Conservatoire de Paris
- Occupations: Pianist; Conductor; Academic teacher
- Organizations: Northern Sinfonia; Orchestra Filarmonica di Torino; Sofia Philharmonic Orchestra; École Normale de Musique de Paris
- Awards: Ordre national du Mérite; Légion d’Honneur

Jean-Bernard Pommier (17 August 1944 – 23 April 2026) was a French pianist, conductor and academic teacher who made an international career. He was known for playing music by Beethoven, Tchaikovsky and Rachmaninoff. As a conductor, he led the Northern Sinfonia, the Orchestra Filarmonica di Torino and Sofia Philharmonic Orchestra. From 2006 to 2008, he directed the Festival de Menton. He taught as professor at the École Normale de Musique de Paris from 2018.

== Life and career ==
Jean-Bernard Pommier was born in Béziers on 17 August 1944, the son of an organist. He began playing the piano at the age of four and gave his first public concert at the age of seven. He had his first lessons in Béziers with the Russian-schooled Mina Koslova. His father introduced him to Pablo Casals. At the age of 14, he moved to Paris to study the piano, first privately with Yves Nat, as his last student, and then at the Conservatoire de Paris with Pierre Sancan, also studying conducting with Eugène Bigot. Later, he also worked with Eugene Istomin in New York City.

He was recognised internationally when he won Berlin Young Musicians International Competition in 1960. In 1962, he was at age 17 the youngest finalist at the International Tchaikovsky Competition in Moscow. He was awarded an honourable mention by a jury presided over by Emil Gilels.

In 1963 Pommier and Eugene Istomin met in Sofia where Pommier played Ravel's Piano Concerto in G major for the first time. Istomin complimented him on the Ravel Concerto and suggested they would meet again. They established a transatlantic relationship punctuated by Istomin's travels to Europe. Istomin said: "It was not a master-student relationship, but an ongoing dialogue between colleagues. Jean-Bernard's career was already well launched! I cannot take the glory for this – it is Jean-Bernard who deserves all the credit. I am honoured to have been his teacher - the teacher of an exceptional student!”. They would go on to have a friendship of over forty years, performing together and making recordings.

=== Career ===
After the Tchaikovsky Competition, Pommier began recording with EMI. Ten years later, he began a long period of collaboration with Herbert von Karajan and the Berlin Philharmonic in Berlin and Salzburg. He played with conductors including Pierre Boulez, Zubin Mehta, Bernard Haitink, Kurt Masur, Riccardo Muti and Simon Rattle, among others. His recital and concert appearances included London, Vienna, Berlin, Leipzig, Dresden, Amsterdam, Moscow, Chicago and New York City. He performed Beethoven's complete piano concertos with Daniel Barenboim conducting the Orchestre de Paris.

From the beginning of the 1980s, Pommier also worked as a conductor working with major orchestras in Europe and America such as the Orchestre philharmonique de Radio France, Philharmonia Orchestra in London, the Royal Liverpool Philharmonic Orchestra, San Francisco Symphony, Los Angeles Philharmonic, Staatskapelle Dresden, Royal Philharmonic Orchestra, Rotterdam Philharmonic, Tonhalle Zurich, Warsaw Philharmonic, Czech Philharmonic, Budapest Symphony, Leipzig Radio, Belgium National Orchestra, Orchestre de la Suisse Romande and Salzburg Mozarteum.

He conducted piano concertos from the keyboard, with the Scottish Chamber Orchestra, the Northern Sinfonia, the English Chamber Orchestra, the Chamber Orchestra of Europe, the Sinfonia Varsovia, the Israel Chamber Orchestra, and the Orchestre de Chambre de Lausanne. His chamber music partners included Isaac Stern, Itzhak Perlman, Mstislav Rostropovich, Pinchas Zukerman, Leonard Rose, Alexander Schneider, Jean-Pierre Rampal, Paul Tortelier, Maurice Bourgue, Jaime Laredo, Josef Suk, the Guarneri Quartet and the Vermeer Quartet. Pommier gave masterclasses in Chicago, London, Lausanne, Rotterdam, Durham, Barcelona, Melbourne and Shanghai. Pommier was also artistic director of the Northern Sinfonia, principal conductor of the Orchestra Filarmonica di Torino, and principal conductor of the Sofia Philharmonic Orchestra. From 2006 to 2008 he was artistic director of the Festival de Menton.

Pommier recorded Mozart's complete Piano Sonatas and piano concertos by Mozart, Tchaikovsky and Rachmaninoff, among others. He recorded Poulenc's Concerto for Two Pianos and Orchestra with pianist Anne Queffélec and the City of London Sinfonia, conducted by Richard Hickox. Pommier recorded the Sonate Pour Deux Pianistes that the jazz pianist Claude Bolling composed on Pommier's initiative with the composer in 1972. A recording of Beethoven's complete Piano Sonatas earned him a Diapason d'Or. He was a recipient of the Ordre national du Mérite and the Légion d’Honneur.

=== Personal life ===
Pommier was married to the Russian violinist Olga Martinova, with whom he often performed.

Pommier died in Boujan-sur-Libron on 23 April 2026, at the age of 81, after a long illness.

Preceded by Heinrich Schiff	Artistic Director, Northern Sinfonia; 1996–1999	Succeeded by Thomas Zehetmair
