= Douglas Boyd =

British oboist and conductor

- Born: 1959 (age 66–67); Glasgow, Scotland
- Education: Royal Academy of Music
- Occupations: oboist conductor

Douglas Boyd (born 1959, Glasgow, Scotland) is a British oboist and conductor.

== Biography ==
Boyd studied oboe at the Royal Academy of Music, London, as a pupil of Janet Craxton. He later was a student with Maurice Bourgue in Paris. In 1984 he won the Young Concert Artists International Auditions, which led to his New York City recital debut at Carnegie Hall.

Boyd was one of the founding members of the Chamber Orchestra of Europe (COE), and served as its principal oboist from 1981 to 2002. During his time with the COE, he developed an interest in conducting, and counted as his first conducting mentors Claudio Abbado and Nikolaus Harnoncourt. He also had guidance from Paavo Berglund and Sir Colin Davis. In 2006, Boyd ceased performing on the oboe to focus full-time on his conducting career.

In 2001, Boyd became music director of the Manchester Camerata, his first major conducting post. He conducted several recordings with the Manchester Camerata for the Avie label, including music of Beethoven, Mozart and Mahler. Boyd concluded his Manchester tenure after the 2010–2011 season. Boyd has also served as principal guest conductor of the City of London Sinfonia. In November 2012, Boyd was named artistic director of Garsington Opera, with immediate effect.

Outside of the UK, in April 2008, the Orchester Musikkollegium Winterthur announced the appointment of Boyd as its principal conductor, as of the 2009–2010 season. Boyd has since extended his Winterthur contract through the 2015–2016 season, and concluded his Winterthur tenure after the 2015–2016 season. Boyd has conducted the Winterthur orchestra in commercial recordings of music of Wolfgang Amadeus Mozart, Felix Mendelssohn and Josef Rheinberger. On 1 July 2015, Boyd became the new music director of the Orchestre de chambre de Paris. He held the post through the 2019-2020 season.

In the US, Boyd's first conducting appearance was with the Gardner Chamber Orchestra in 2000. In 2002, Boyd became co-artistic director of the orchestra, along with Paula Robison. In 2004, he became one of the first Artistic Partners with the Saint Paul Chamber Orchestra. In 2006, he extended his contract with the SPCO into the 2009–2010 season. He concluded his SPCO Artistic Partnership in September 2009. He first conducted the Colorado Symphony Orchestra in December 2006, and was named their principal guest conductor in January 2008, for a contract of 3 years with 2 weeks of guest appearances per season.

Boyd and his wife Sally Pendlebury, a cellist, have three children, Iona, Sebastian and Sam. The family reside in London.

Cultural offices
Preceded by Sachio Fujioka	Music Director, Manchester Camerata; 2001–2011	Succeeded by Gábor Takács-Nagy
Preceded by Jac van Steen	Principal Conductor, Orchester Musikkollegium Winterthur; 2009–2016	Succeeded by Thomas Zehetmair
Preceded by Anthony Whitworth-Jones	Artistic Director, Garsington Opera; 2012–present	Succeeded by incumbent
Preceded by John Nelson	Music Director, Orchestre de chambre de Paris; 2015–2020	Succeeded by Lars Vogt
