= Károly Schranz =

Hungarian violinist

Károly Schranz is a Hungarian violinist and founding second violinist of the Takács Quartet. During his forty-three year career with the quartet he received awards from the Hungarian Government of the Knight's Cross and the Commander's Cross of the Order of Merit of the Republic of Hungary. As a member of the Takács he was awarded one Grammy and four nominations, several Gramophone Awards, as well as other awards of excellence.

== Biography ==
Born in Budapest, Hungary in 1952, he began playing the violin at the age of four, receiving his first lessons from a Gypsy violinist neighbor. At fourteen he entered the Béla Bartók Secondary Music School in Budapest and upon graduation from that institution he entered the prestigious Franz Liszt Academy of Music. It was there in 1975 that he co-founded the Takács Quartet with classmates Gábor Takács-Nagy (violin), Gábor Ormai (viola), and András Fejér (cello). Károly was the recipient of the Franz Liszt Prize in 1983. He currently lives in Boulder, Colorado with his wife and three daughters.

== Evaluation ==
New York Times music critic Jeremy Eichler wrote of Károly: "...The second violinist, Karoly Schranz, is the musical heart of this quartet, and he often leans toward the center of the ensemble as he plays, urging the phrases forward from deep within the fray. He and the cellist, Andras Fejer, are the only two original members remaining, though their dark, rich Central European tone is still at the core of the quartet's sound." He left the Takacs Quartet in 2018
