= Barry Wordsworth =

British conductor (born 1948)

- Born: 20 February 1948 (age 77); Worcester Park, Surrey, England, UK
- Occupation: conductor
- Years active: 1972–present

Barry Wordsworth (born 20 February 1948) is a British conductor.

== Biography ==
Wordsworth was appointed assistant conductor to the touring orchestra of The Royal Ballet in 1972. In 1973, he became principal conductor of the Sadler's Wells Royal Ballet, and held the same title after the company moved to Birmingham to become the Birmingham Royal Ballet (BRB). He served as music director of the Royal Ballet from 1990 to 1995, and again from 2006 to 2015. He returned to BRB as its music director from 2005 to 2008. Wordsworth is currently principal guest conductor of The Royal Ballet.

From 1989 to 2006, he was principal conductor of the BBC Concert Orchestra, becoming conductor laureate in 2006. From 1989 to 2015, Wordsworth was music director and the Principal Conductor of the Brighton Philharmonic Orchestra. In March 2007 at Brighton, Wordsworth caused controversy when he refused to conduct Andrew Gant's new composition A British Symphony the day of its scheduled premiere.

Wordsworth's discography includes works by lesser-known British composers alongside more mainstream pieces. In his career Wordsworth has appeared with orchestras in the UK and overseas. He has made appearances at the BBC Proms and conducted the Last Night of the Proms in 1993 with the BBC Symphony Orchestra. In 2003, he was the first conductor to record commercially all nine surviving movements of Constant Lambert's ballet Horoscope (only a suite of five movements had previously been recorded).

Cultural offices
Preceded by John Carewe	Music Director and Principal Conductor, Brighton Philharmonic Orchestra; 1989–2015	Succeeded by Joanna MacGregor
Preceded by Ashley Lawrence	Principal Conductor, BBC Concert Orchestra; 1989–2006	Succeeded by Keith Lockhart
