= Ashley Lawrence (musician) =

New Zealand conductor (1934–1990)

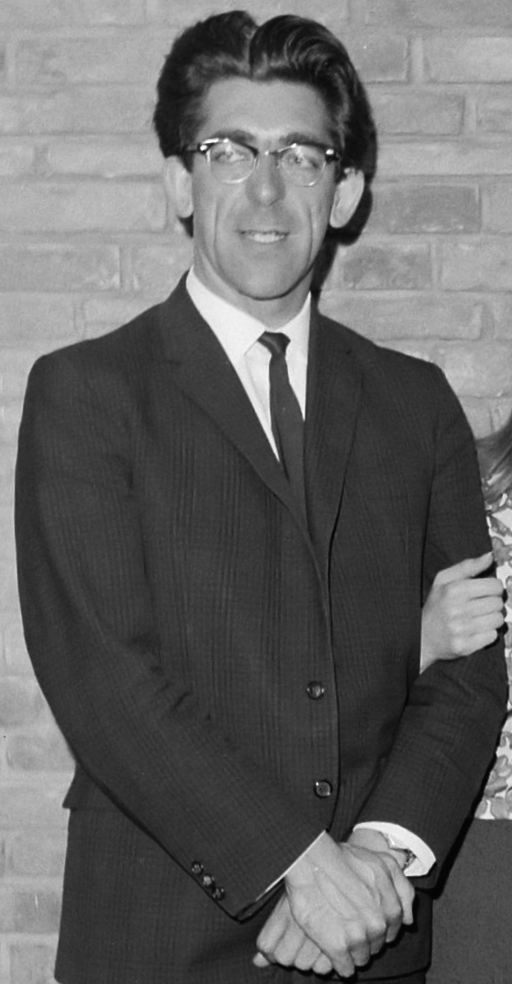
Ashley Lawrence in 1964

Ashley Macdonald Lawrence (5 June 1934, Hamilton, New Zealand – 7 May 1990, Tokyo) was a New Zealand conductor mainly active in the UK and Germany, and particularly associated with ballet.

== Career ==
After having graduated from the University of Auckland, Lawrence went to London in 1956 and spent three years at the Royal College of Music studying piano and conducting. He also studied with Rafael Kubelik. In 1962 he joined the Royal Ballet and soon made his debut at the Royal Opera House, Covent Garden.

In September 1966 he became Music Director of the ballet company of the Deutsche Oper in West Berlin, and in 1971 was appointed Music Director of the Stuttgart Ballet. In 1971 he also became Principal Conductor of the BBC Concert Orchestra. In 1972 he was appointed as Principal Conductor of the Royal Ballet at Covent Garden, and in 1973 Music Director of the same company, leaving in 1987. He also regularly conducted the Sadler's Wells Royal Ballet, including on a tour to his home country in late 1989. He was Principal Guest Conductor of the Paris Opera Ballet from 1987 to 1989, and had been appointed to a similar position at the New York City Ballet shortly before his death.

At the Deutsche Oper, Lawrence not only played piano for rehearsals, but conducted all the ballet performances, and made time to learn Benesh Movement Notation. Kenneth MacMillan credited him with suggesting music by Martinů to be used in the ballet Anastasia.

He had a wide repertoire in the concert hall, with many studio broadcasts on BBC radio with the BBC Concert Orchestra. He conducted at the Proms with programmes of Tchaikovsky; Delius, Grainger and Sullivan (1974) and Sullivan (1975). Lawrence conducted the premieres of works by Arthur Butterworth, Anthony Hedges, Anthony Payne, Gerard Schurmann, Patric Standford and Robert Farnon.

He conducted the premieres of many ballet productions, including:

- Berlin: Cain und Abel, 1968 (music by Panufnik), Scarecrows, 1970 (Reimann)
- Stuttgart: Carmen, 1970 (Wolfgang Fortner)
- Royal Ballet: Requiem, 1983 (Fauré), Valley of Shadows, 1983 (Tchaikovsky/Martinů), Varii capricci, 1983 (Walton), Young Apollo, 1984 (Britten/Crosse), The Sons of Horus, 1985 (Peter McGowan), The Prince of the Pagodas, 1990 (Britten).

He also conducted the premiere of MacMillan's production of The Sleeping Beauty for American Ballet Theatre.

With the Royal Ballet, he conducted several televised performances that have been released on video, including Swan Lake (1980), Manon (ballet) (1982) and Romeo and Juliet (Prokofiev) (1984). With Stuttgart Ballet, Giselle und die Wilis (1990).

Peter Wright described him as "the most proficient and responsive conductor of ballet I have ever come across". In preparation for touring engagements with the Royal Ballet, he would often go well in advance to countries as distant as China and India to take the local orchestra through the music. Barry Wordsworth considered him to be "one of the most modest yet self-reliant and determined men" he had met.

Lawrence was a private, reticent man but generous to colleagues with advice and knowledge. He often had a punishing schedule, conducting alternative nights in Paris and London with BBC recordings in the daytime in between. He died in Tokyo while on tour with the Stuttgart Ballet, from an aneurysm.

== Recordings ==
Along with TV recordings, a performance of Britten's The Prince of the Pagodas at the Royal Ballet in 1990 has been issued. Lawrence conducted the ballet music in the pioneering BBC recording of Verdi's Les vêpres siciliennes in 1969. Radio recordings of Tchaikovsky, Bridge, Delius and Grainger, Milhaud, have been issued on CD, along with The Wedding on the Eiffel Tower by Auric, Milhaud, Poulenc, Tailleferre, and Honegger. In association with the BBC television series, he conducted ballet music for the LP 'The Magic of Dance' in 1979.

In 1988 he conducted Patience for a broadcast on BBC Radio 2 on 22 October 1989.

A 1972 BBC radio recording of Walter Leigh's Jolly Roger conducted by Lawrence, with Maryetta and Vernon Midgley, Helen Landis, Alan Dudley and Neilson Taylor among the cast, was issued by Lyrita in 2015.

== Filmography ==
Ashley Lawrence featured as conductor in various television programmes:

- "This is Rudolf Nureyev" (1965)
- "The Tribute" (1966)
- "The Royal Ballet in rehearsal: Concerto" (1967) (Piano)
- "Arena: Theatre" (1975)
- "Gala Performance" (28 March 1975)
- "Gala Performance" (2 January 1976)
- "The Queen's Silver Jubilee Gala" (1977)
- "Dance Month: The Dream; A Month in the Country" (1978)
- "The Magic of Dance – Reflections" by Dame Margot Fonteyn: "The Romantic Ballet" / "What is New" / "The Ebb and Flow" / "The Magnificent Beginning" / "Out in the Limelight, Home in the rain" (1979)

Cultural offices
Preceded by Marcus Dods	Principal Conductor, BBC Concert Orchestra; 1970–1989	Succeeded by Barry Wordsworth
Preceded by John Lanchbery	Music Director, The Royal Ballet; 1973–1987	Succeeded by Barry Wordsworth
