= János Fürst =

Background information
- Born: 8 August 1935; Hungary
- Died: 3 January 2007 (aged 71) Paris, France
- Occupations: Conductor, violinist

János Fürst (8 August 1935 – 3 January 2007) was a Hungarian-born conductor and violinist.

== Biography ==
Fürst was born in Budapest to a Jewish-Hungarian family. He originally studied the violin at the Franz Liszt Academy of Music in his native Budapest. After the 1956 Soviet invasion of Hungary, he continued studies at the conservatory in Brussels. He attended the Conservatoire de Paris and there won a Premier Prix. He took a job in 1958 with the Radio Éireann Symphony Orchestra, and developed his career as an orchestra leader.

In 1963, Fürst founded the Irish Chamber Orchestra, and developed his conducting career from that point. On the formation of the Ulster Orchestra in 1966, Fürst became its concertmaster, and later its assistant conductor in 1971. He held positions as Chief Conductor and Music Director with orchestras in Malmö (1974–77), Aalborg (1980–83), Dublin, Winterthur (1990–94) and was Chief Guest Conductor of the Helsinki Philharmonic Orchestra.

Fürst was music director of the Opéra de Marseille from 1981 to 1990. He was also a frequent guest at English National Opera, Scottish Opera and the Royal Swedish Opera. In 1978 he conducted the premiere of Salome by Sir Peter Maxwell Davies and subsequently recorded it.

He also made numerous recordings for Vox Records with the Bamberg Symphony Orchestra, including some rarely heard orchestral music of Tchaikovsky released in the mid-1970s; some of the recordings have been reissued on CD.

Fürst was known as a fine teacher. A number of his students at the Paris Conservatoire won prestigious conducting competitions. He worked with youth orchestras including the National Youth Orchestra of Great Britain. Late in life he was invited to become head of orchestral conducting at Royal College of Music in London, but he did not live enough to take up the post.

== Death ==
Fürst died of cancer in Paris in 2007. He was married three times. His first wife, Antoinette (now Antoinette Kirshbaum), his third wife and two sons survived him.

== Awards and nominations ==
=== ARIA Music Awards ===
The ARIA Music Awards is an annual awards ceremony that recognises excellence, innovation, and achievement across all genres of Australian music. They commenced in 1987.

Year	Nominee / work	Award	Result	Ref.
1995	Powerhouse Three Poems of Byron – Capriccio Nocturnes Unchained Melody (with Adelaide Symphony Orchestra & David Porcelijn)	Best Classical Album	Nominated	

Cultural offices
Preceded by Elyakum Shapirra	Chief Conductor, Malmö Symphony Orchestra; 1974–1977	Succeeded by Stig Westerberg
Preceded by Franz Welser-Möst	Principal Conductor, Orchester Musikkollegium Winterthur; 1990–1994	Succeeded by Heinrich Schiff
