= Irish Chamber Orchestra =

The Irish Chamber Orchestra (ICO) is an Irish classical music ensemble, administratively based at the University of Limerick. János Fürst founded the ICO in 1963. The ICO consisted only of strings as its regular ensemble for many years, adding wind, brass and percussion players on a freelance basis when needed. The ICO was reformed in 1970 under the name of the New Irish Chamber Orchestra and the principal conductorship of André Prieur. The orchestra first toured North America in 1978. In 1995, the orchestra was again reconstituted, reverting to its original name of the Irish Chamber Orchestra.

== Overview ==
Since May 2022, Thomas Zehetmair has been Principal Conductor and Artistic Partner of the Irish Chamber Orchestra.

Irish composers who have worked with the orchestra include Frank Corcoran, Mícheál Ó Súilleabháin, and Bill Whelan.

Plectrum & Bow, a CD release, marked a collaborative recording with US composer and guitarist Steve Mackey. It features his Concerto for Violin and Strings, Four Iconoclastic Episodes, which was jointly commissioned by the Irish Chamber Orchestra, the Academy of St Martin in the Fields and the DeBartolo Performing Arts Center, University of Notre Dame, US. Other recordings include Night Moves, conducted by Gérard Korsten, and Hommage, which features works by Irish composer John Kinsella.

It owns a custom built studio, which has been acoustically modelled, on campus at UL, Limerick.

== Music and artistic directors ==
- János Fürst
- André Prieur
- Nicholas Kraemer (artistic director, 1986–1992)
- Fionnuala Hunt (music director, 1995–2002)
- Nicholas McGegan (music director, 2002–2005)
- Anthony Marwood (artistic director, 2006–2011)
- Jörg Widmann (Principal Guest Conductor/Artistic Partner, 2011–2017; Principal Conductor/Artistic Partner, 2017–2022)
- Gábor Takács-Nagy (Principal Artistic Partner, 2013–2018)
- Thomas Zehetmair (Principal Conductor/Artistic Partner, 2022–2025)
- Henning Kraggerud (Principal Conductor/Artistic Partner, 2025–)

== See also ==
- Something Else (The Cranberries album), a 2017 live album featuring the group
