= Oulu Symphony Orchestra =

Finnish orchestra

- Symphony orchestra
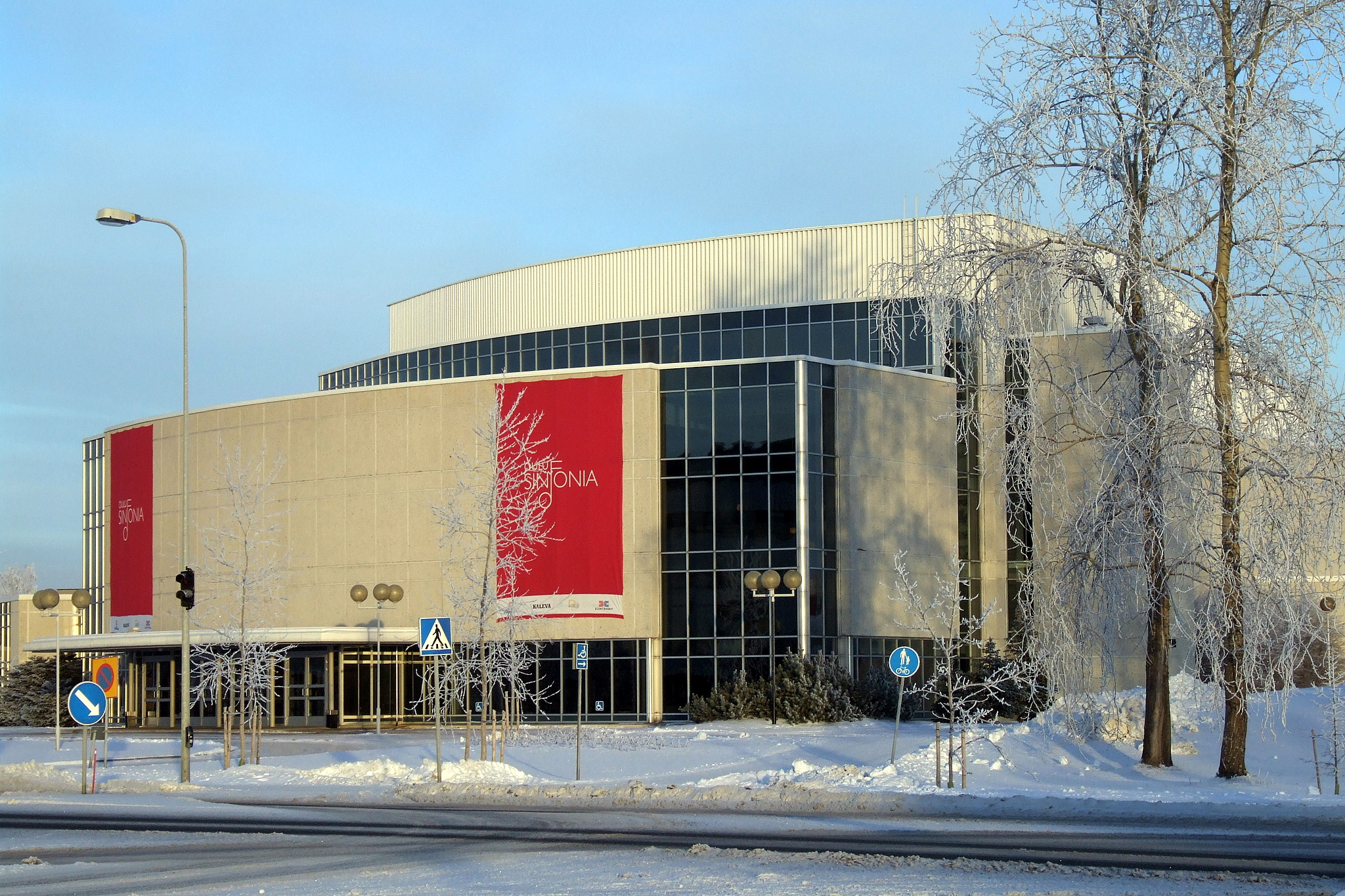
- Oulu Music Centre
- Native name: Oulu Sinfonia
- Former name: Oulun kaupunginorkesteri
- Founded: 1937
- Location: Oulu, Finland
- Concert hall: Madetoja Hall
- Principal conductor: Rumon Gamba
- Website: www.oulusinfonia.fi

The Oulu Symphony Orchestra (Finnish: Oulu Sinfonia or formerly Oulun kaupunginorkesteri) is a Finnish orchestra based in Oulu, Finland. Oulu Sinfonia gives concerts primarily at the Oulu Music Centre, in the Madetojan sali (Madetoja Concert Hall), located in the Karjasilta district, and named for Leevi Madetoja, who was born in Oulu.

== History ==
The roots of the orchestra date back to 1856, with the first attempts to establish a permanent orchestra in Oulu. The Oulu Music Society (Oulun Soitannollinen Seura) was established in 1901, and worked with such musicians as Toivo Kuula and Jean Sibelius. The current orchestra officially began its activities in 1937, as the Oulu Orchestra. In 1954, the city of Oulu granted the orchestra the rights to use the name of the Oulu City Orchestra, and municipalised the orchestra in 1961. The orchestra took up its current residence at the Oulu Music Centre in 1983. The orchestra acquired its current name of Oulu Sinfonia in 2005.

Under the orchestra's current name, past chief conductors of the orchestra have included Dima Slobodeniouk (2005-2008) and Anna-Maria Helsing (2010-2013). Helsing was the first female chief conductor in the history of the orchestra. From 2013 to 2021, Johannes Gustavsson served as chief conductor. Under Gustavsson, Oulu Sinfonia has recorded commercially for such labels as Ondine.

The current chief conductor of the orchestra is Rumon Gamba, since January 2022. In February 2024, the orchestra announced the extension of Gamba's contract as chief conductor through 2026.

== Chief conductors (partial list) ==
- Urpo Pesonen (1944–1959)
- Ari Angervo (1985-1990)
- Peeter Lilje (1990–1993)
- Arvo Volmer (1994–2005)
- Dima Slobodeniouk (2005–2008)
- Anna-Maria Helsing (2010–2013)
- Johannes Gustavsson (2013–2021)
- Rumon Gamba (2022–present)
