= John Landor =

British conductor

John Landor is conductor and music director of the London Musical Arts Orchestra. He studied at Oxford University, the Royal Academy of Music in London and the St Petersburg Conservatory under conducting teacher Ilya Musin. A semi-finalist in the Besançon International Conductors' Competition in 1991, he has conducted orchestras, choirs and opera companies in Spain, Italy, Bulgaria, Russia, Germany, France, Romania and South Africa. His recordings include releases for Pickwick Records. He is an Associate of the Royal Academy of Music, London and has presented a series at St Martin-in-the-Fields, London since 1992. John is also a composer, arranger and an experienced and popular presenter of educational concerts for both children and adults, including the Mini Maestro Family Concert and Meet-the-Music series at St Martin-in-the-Fields.

== Biography ==
American-born British conductor John Landor has been Music Director of London Musical Arts Orchestra since its formation in 1985. He has also conducted at major London venues such as the Queen Elizabeth Hall and St. John's Smith Square and worked with international soloists Hu Kun, Raphael Wallfisch, Alexander Baillie, Jill Gomez, Nicola Benedetti and many of Britain's finest early musicians.

He is frequent guest conductor abroad, performing and recording in France, Germany, Italy, Spain, Russia, the Czech Republic, Bulgaria, Romania, Poland and South Africa.

John brings to his work both intimate knowledge and wide practical experience of a broad range of musical styles. He was educated at Westminster Cathedral Choir School, Oxford University, the Royal Academy of Music in London and the St Petersburg State Conservatory where he studied with the legendary Ilya Musin. His professional work includes symphony and chamber orchestra repertoire, early music, contemporary music, opera/operetta and choral-orchestral works.

John is also a composer, arranger and an experienced presenter of educational concerts for both children and adults.

He has recorded several CDs for Pickwick Records. His achievements have been recognised by election as an Associate of the Royal Academy of Music, London.

== Music-in-Motion ==
John Landor created Music-in-Motion, an immersive, visual and theatrical performance concept which brings a bold new aesthetic approach to the traditional classical concert. During a Music-in-Motion concert, musicians are encouraged to embody the music whilst performing, moving and playing from memory. John Landor said to the New York Times: “I just wanted a sense of people being inside the music, you remember things visually so much better. The amount of space in your brain that processes visual things is much bigger than what processes sound.”

== Educational Concerts ==
John Landor has been presenting the popular Mini Maestro Family Concert series for children aged 4 to 12 at St Martin-in-the-Fields since 2006, and his Meet-the-Music series since 2010, also at St Martin-in-the-Fields together with the London Musical Arts Orchestra.

== Candlelight Concerts ==
John Landor has been conducting candlelight concerts at St Martin-in-the-Fields, London since 1992.
