= Jac van Steen =

Dutch conductor (born 1956)

Jac van Steen (born 1956 in Eindhoven) is a Dutch conductor. He studied music theory, as well as orchestral and choral conducting, at the Brabants Conservatory of Music.

In the Netherlands, van Steen was conductor and music director of the Nijmegen Bach Choir from 1986 to 1990. From 1989 to 1994, he was the music director of Het Nationale Ballet in Amsterdam. Since 1992, he has been on the faculty at the Royal Conservatory of music and dance in The Hague. Currently, in collaboration with fellow conductors Kenneth Montgomery and Ed Spanjaard at the Royal Conservatory in The Hague, he manages a course in conducting, to which only two students are admitted annually.

Between 1997 and 2002, van Steen was chief conductor of the Nuremberg Symphony Orchestra. He has also served as music director of the Neues Berliner Kammerorchester. Between 2002 and 2005 he was a music director of Deutsches Nationaltheater Weimar and chief conductor of the Staatskapelle Weimar. Van Steen was chief conductor of the Orchester Musikkollegium Winterthur from 2002 to 2008. Between 2008 and 2013, he was Generalmusikdirektor of the Dortmunder Philharmoniker (Dortmund Philharmonic Orchestra).

In the UK, van Steen was principal guest conductor of the BBC National Orchestra of Wales between 2005 and 2013. In May 2014, the Ulster Orchestra named van Steen its next principal guest conductor, effective September 2014. Van Steen has frequently been broadcast by the BBC, and has recorded many CDs with various of the orchestras he has directed.

Van Steen is also principal guest conductor of the Prague Symphony Orchestra (2013 - ).

Cultural offices
| Preceded by Thomas Gabrisch | Chief Conductor, Nürnberger Symphoniker; 1997–2002 | Succeeded by Bernhard Gueller |
| Preceded by George Alexander Albrecht | Chief Conductor, Staatskapelle Weimar; 2002–2005 | Succeeded by Carl St.Clair |
| Preceded by Heinrich Schiff | Chief Conductor, Orchester Musikkollegium Winterthur; 2002–2008 | Succeeded by Douglas Boyd |
| Preceded by Arthur Fagen | Generalmusikdirektor, Dortmunder Philharmoniker; 2008–2013 | Succeeded by Gabriel Feltz |
