= Orquesta Sinfónica de Galicia =

Spanish orchestra founded in 1992

- Orchestra
- Founded: 1992
- Location: A Coruña
- Principal conductor: Roberto González-Monjas
- Website: Official website

YouTube information
- Channel: SinfonicadeGalicia
- Years active: 2008-present
- Genre: Classical music
- Subscribers: 151 thousand
- Views: 5.07 million
- Last updated: 11 October 2022

Orquesta Sinfónica de Galicia is a Spanish orchestra, created in 1992 and based in A Coruña. Its conductor is Roberto González-Monjas.

== 2012-13 staff ==
- Violins I: Massimo Spadano (CM), Ludwig Dürichen (CMA), Vladimir Prjevalski (CMA), Ruslan Asanov, Yana Antonyan, Caroline Bournaud, Gabriel Bussi, Vinka Hauser, Dominica Malec, Dorothea Nicholas, Benjamin Smith, Stefan Utanu, Florian Vlashi, Roman Wojtowicz
- Violins II: Julián Gil (P), Fumika Yamamura (P), Lucica Trita (PA), Gertraud Brilmayer, Lilia Kirilova, Marcelo González, Deborah Hamburger, Enrique Iglesias, Helle Karlsson, Gregory Klass, Adrián Linares, Stefan Marinescu, Mihai Tanasescu
- Violas: Eugenia Petrova (P), Francisco Miguens (P), Andrei Kevorkov (PA), Raymond Arteaga, Alison Dalglish, Despina Ionescu, Jeffrey Johnson, Jozef Kramar, Luigi Mazzucato, Karen Poghosyan, Wladimir Rosinskij
- Celli: David Ethève (P), Puslana Prokopenko (P), Gabriel Tanasescu (PA), Antonieta Carrasco, Berthold Hamburger, Scott Hardy, Vladimir Litvihk, Ramón Solsona, Florence Ronfort
- Double Basses: Risto Vuolanne (P), Diego Zecharies (P), Todd Williamson (PA), Mario Alexandre, Douglas Gwynn, Sergei Rechetilov, José Rodrigues

- Flutes: Claudia Walker (P), María J. Ortuño (PA), Juan Ibáñez
- Oboes: Casey Hill (P), David Villa (PA), Scott MacLeod
- Clarinets: Juan A. Ferrer (P), Iván Marín (PA), Pere Anguera
- Bassoons: Steve Harriswangler (P), Mary H. Harriswangler (PA), Manuel A. Salgueiro

- Horns: David Bushnell (P), David Fernández (P), Miguel Á. Garza (PA), Manuel Moya, Amy Schimmelman
- Trumpets: John A. Hurn (P), Thomas Purdie (PA), Michael Halpern
- Trombones: Petur Eiriksson (P), Jon Etterbeek (P), Eyvind Sommerfelt
- Tuba: Jesper Boile-Nielsen (P)

- Percussion: Simon Levey (P), José A. Trigueros (P), José Belmonte, Alejandro Sanz
- Harp: Celine Landelle (P)

== World Premieres ==
Season	Date	Composer	Composition	Conductor
2007–08	2008-01-11	Wladimir Rosinskij	Cello Concerto	Tuomas Ollila
	2008-04-04	Joam Trillo	Festa na lembrança	Rubén Gimeno
2008–09	2009-03-13	Sergio Moure de Oteyza	Admonitum	Víctor Pablo Pérez
	2009-04-17	Eduardo Soutullo	They Hear no Answering Strain	Josep Pons
	2009-04-24	Antoni Ernest Sebastià	Angelus Novus	José Ramón Encinar
2009–10	2009-11-13	Fernando Alonso	Suite latinoamericana	Miguel Harth-Bedoya
	2010-02-19	Juan Vara	Noche más allá de la noche	Pablo González
	2010-04-23	Tomás Marco	Symphony No. 9 Thalassa	Víctor Pablo Pérez
2010–11	2011-02-11	Fernando Buide	Antiphones	Pietari Inkinen
	2011-03-18	Octavio Vazquez	Ewiges blaues Licht	Víctor Pablo Pérez
2011–12	2011-11-05	Fernando Alonso	Diálogos en la penumbra	Pietro Rizzo
	2011-11-11	David Vayo	Wellspring	Michal Nesterowicz
	2011-11-18	Fernando Buide	Lingua de escuma	Miguel Harth-Bedoya
2012–13	2012-10-19	Federico Mosquera	Three Symphonic Movements	Víctor Pablo Pérez
	2012-10-26	Eligio Vila	Symphonic Meditations	Guillermo García Calvo
	2013-01-05	Wladimir Rosinskij	Taimyr	Pietro Rizzo
	2013-02-01	Javier Martínez Campos	Cliffs of Moher	Josep Pons

== Music directors ==
- Víctor Pablo Pérez (1993 - 2013)
- Dima Slobodeniouk (2013 - 2022)
- Roberto González-Monjas (2023 - 2029)
