= Royal Northern Sinfonia =

British chamber orchestra

- Orchestra
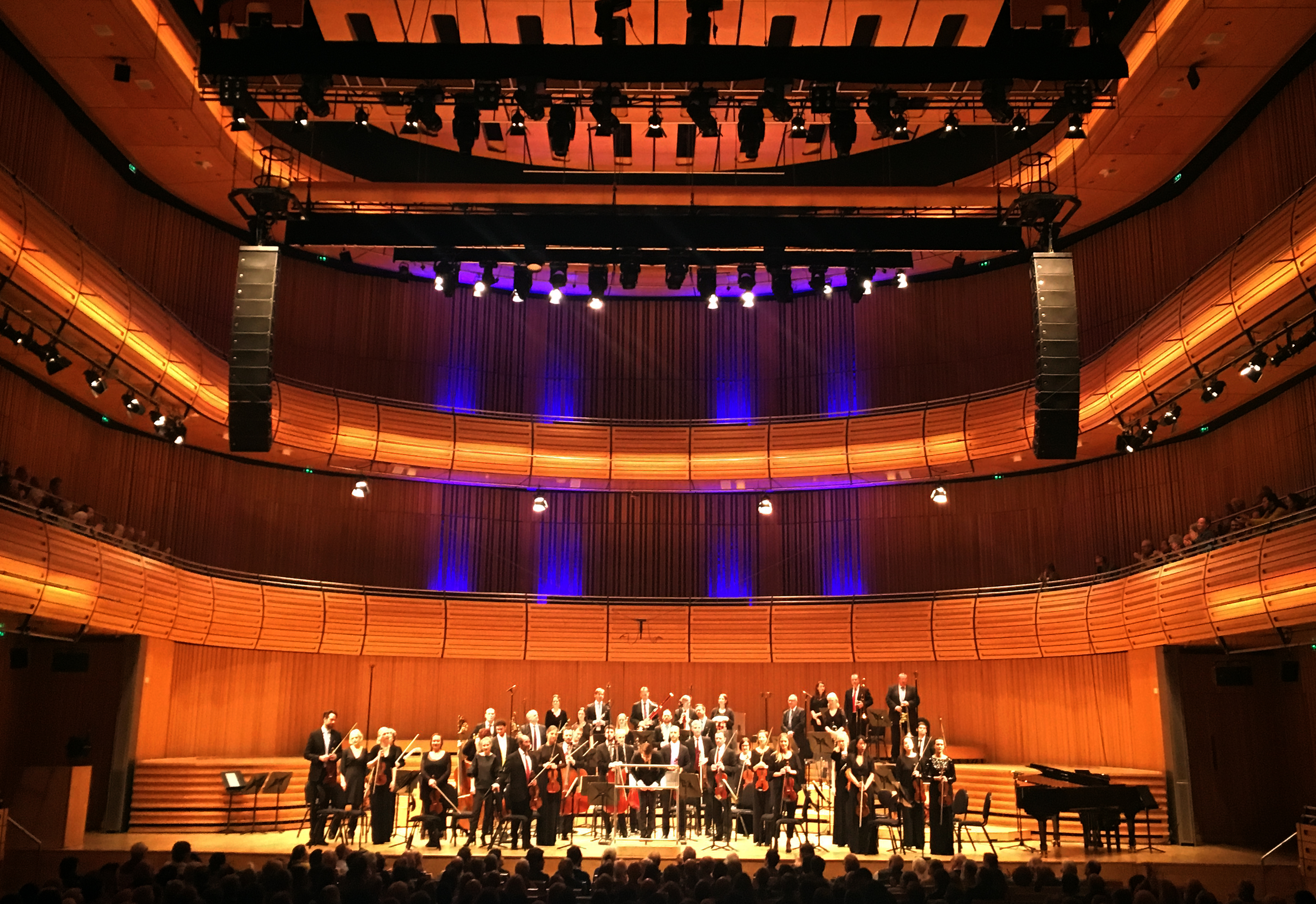
- Former name: Northern Sinfonia
- Founded: 1958; 68 years ago
- Concert hall: Glasshouse International Centre for Music
- Principal conductor: Dinis Sousa

Royal Northern Sinfonia is a British chamber orchestra, founded in Newcastle upon Tyne and currently based in Gateshead. For the first 46 years of its history the orchestra gave most of its concerts at the Newcastle City Hall. It also gave monthly concerts in Middlesbrough town hall and at Stockton & Billingham Technical College in Billingham. Since 2004 the orchestra has been resident at The Glasshouse, formerly known as Sage Gateshead. In June 2013 Queen Elizabeth II bestowed the title 'Royal' on the orchestra, formally naming it Royal Northern Sinfonia.

== History ==
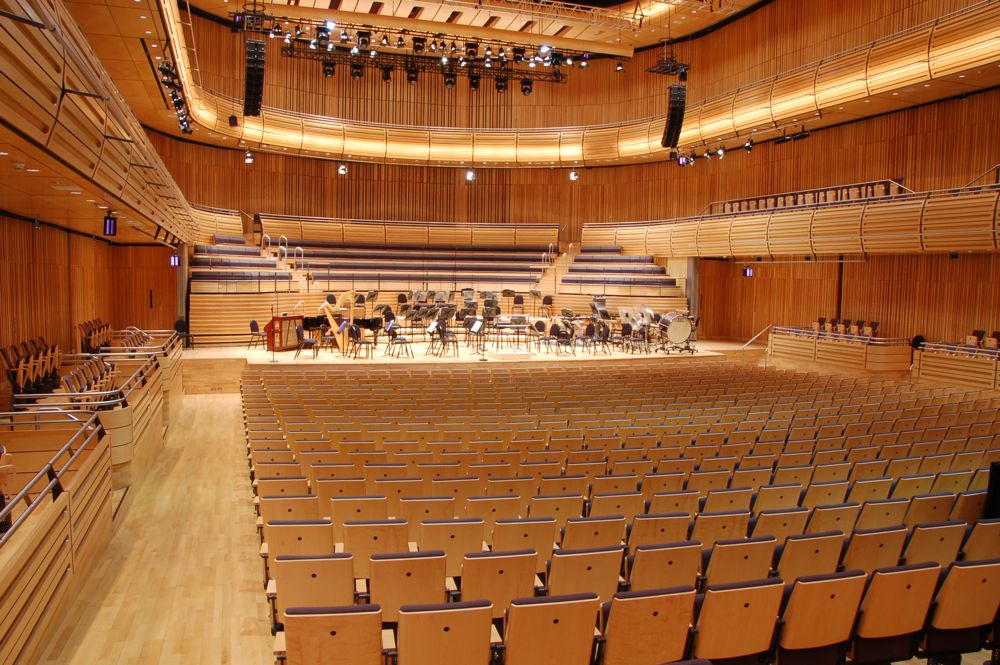
Hall 1 at Sage Gateshead, the orchestra's current home

Michael Hall (1932–2012) founded the ensemble in 1958 as the first permanent professional resident chamber orchestra in Britain outside London. The ensemble gave its first concert on 24 September 1958 as the 'Sinfonia Orchestra', at the City Hall, Newcastle upon Tyne, and gave six concerts in its first season, 1958–1959. Hall acted as the organization's single leader, in effect as "general manager, secretary, artistic director, conductor and fund-raiser", though without a formal title. The word 'Northern' was added to the orchestra's name in 1959 to give the name of 'Northern Sinfonia'. The orchestra became an established institution in 1959, with Humphrey Noble chosen as the first chairman of the ensemble's management committee. Hall resigned from the orchestra in 1964 but returned as a guest conductor in subsequent years. After Hall's departure, Rudolf Schwarz and Boris Brott took over musical leadership of the ensemble in parallel, with Schwarz being the first titled artistic director of the ensemble. Keith Statham served as the orchestra's general manager from 1966 to 1974.

Thomas Zehetmair was appointed as music director in November 2001, starting with the 2002–2003 season, for an initial contract of three years and six weeks of concerts each season. Following contract extensions in 2005 and 2011, he concluded his tenure with the orchestra at the end of the 2013–2014 season. Other conductors on the orchestra's roster currently include as its Principal Conductors John Wilson since 2009 and Mario Venzago since 1 January 2010. Venzago's current contract as Principal Conductor is through 2013. Simon Halsey served as Principal Conductor of the Northern Sinfonia's Choral Programme from 2004 through 2012.

In May 2014, the Royal Northern Sinfonia announced the appointment of Lars Vogt as its next music director, effective September 2015. Vogt served as music director designate for the 2014–2015 season, in his first formal orchestral post. In November 2014, the orchestra announced the appointment of Julian Rachlin as its new principal guest conductor, effective with the 2015–2016 season.

During Vogt's tenure, Royal Northern Sinfonia toured to Asia. In 2017, the orchestra performed at the BBC Proms' first Prom outside of London since 1930, at Stage@TheDock in Hull. Vogt concluded his tenure as music director in 2020, and subsequently held the title of Principal Artistic Partner with the orchestra until his death in September 2022.

In January 2020, Dinis Sousa first guest-conducted the orchestra. He returned as guest conductor in the autumn of 2020. In March 2021, the orchestra announced the appointment of Sousa as its next principal conductor, effective from September 2021. In September 2023, Royal Northern Sinfonia announced the extension of Sousa's contract as principal conductor through the close of the 2026–2027 season.

In November 2022, Nil Venditti first guest-conducted the orchestra. In June 2024, the orchestra announced the appointment of Venditti as its next principal guest conductor, the first female conductor to be named to the post, effective with the 2024–2025 season.

The orchestra has recorded for the NMC and Naxos labels, among others.

== Artistic Directors, Music Directors and Principal Conductors ==
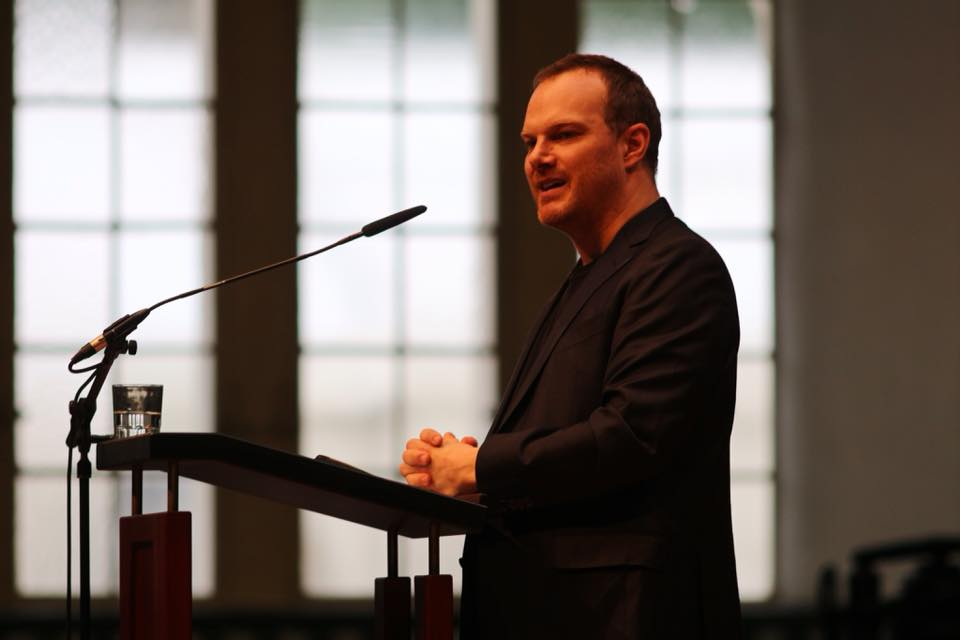
Lars Vogt, former Music Director

- Michael Hall (1958–1964)
- Rudolf Schwarz (1964–1973)
- Christopher Seaman (1973–1979)
- Tamás Vásáry and Iván Fischer (1979–1982)
- Richard Hickox (1982–1990)
- Heinrich Schiff (1990–1996)
- Jean-Bernard Pommier (1996–1999)
- Thomas Zehetmair (music director, 2002–2014)
- Simon Halsey (Principal Conductor, Choral Programme, 2004–2012)
- John Wilson (Principal Conductor, 2009–2015)
- Mario Venzago (Principal Conductor, 2010–2015)
- Lars Vogt (music director, 2015–2020; Principal Artistic Partner, 2020–2022)
- Julian Rachlin (Principal Artistic Partner, 2015–present)
- Thomas Zehetmair (Conductor Laureate, 2015–present)
- Dinis Sousa (Principal Conductor, 2021–present)
