= Heinrich Schiff =

Austrian cellist

Heinrich Schiff (German: [haɪ̯nʁɪç ˈʃɪf]; 18 November 1951 – 23 December 2016) was an Austrian cellist and conductor.

== Early life ==
Heinrich Schiff was born on 18 November 1951 in Gmunden, Austria. His parents, Helga (née Riemann) and Helmut Schiff, were composers. He studied cello with Tobias Kühne and André Navarra and made his solo debut in Vienna and London in 1971. He studied conducting with Hans Swarowsky.

== Career ==
Schiff made his conducting debut in 1986. He was artistic director of the Northern Sinfonia from 1990 to 1996, and recorded with them for the Collins Classics label. He also held chief conductorships with the Copenhagen Philharmonic Orchestra in Copenhagen, Denmark (1996–2000), and the Orchester Musikkollegium Winterthur (1996–2001).

In 2004, he was appointed Chief Conductor of the Vienna Chamber Orchestra and served in the post from 2005 to 2008. He stood down from the post in 2008 for health reasons.

Schiff played the "Mara" Stradivarius (1711) and "Sleeping Beauty" made by Montagnana in Venice in 1739. His recording of the Bach Cello Suites won prizes, and his recording of the Shostakovich concertos won the Grand Prix du Disque in 1985. His recording of the Brahms Double Concerto with Frank Peter Zimmermann and Wolfgang Sawallisch won the Deutscher Schallplattenpreis. Composers who have written cello concertos for Schiff include John Casken, Friedrich Gulda and Otto Zykan.

Among his students were Christian Poltéra, Rudi Spring, Gautier Capuçon, Richard Harwood and Natalie Clein.

== Other ==
Schiff frequently experienced pain in his right shoulder and arm, the one that holds the bow, presumably caused by overexertion, but tried to ignore it. While playing in a chamber concert in Vienna on 25 April 2010 he had to take breaks during pieces due to the pain. After this evening, he never played cello in public again.

Since 2012, the "Mara" cello has been played by Christian Poltéra, one of Schiff's former students.

== Death ==
Schiff died in Vienna on 23 December 2016 at the age of 65.

Cultural offices
Preceded by Richard Hickox	Artistic Director, Northern Sinfonia; 1990–1996	Succeeded by Jean-Bernard Pommier
Preceded by János Fürst	Chief Conductor, Orchester Musikkollegium Winterthur; 1995–2001	Succeeded by Jac van Steen
Preceded by Okko Kamu (first guest conductor)	Chief Conductor, Copenhagen Philharmonic Orchestra; 1996–1999	Succeeded by Giordano Bellincampi
Preceded by Christoph Eberle	Chief Conductor, Vienna Chamber Orchestra; 2005–2008	Succeeded by Stefan Vladar
