= Gilbert Vinter =

English conductor and composer

Gilbert Vinter (4 May 1909 – 10 October 1969) was an English conductor and composer, most celebrated for his compositions for brass bands.

== Life ==
Vinter was born in Lincoln. As a youth, he was a chorister at Lincoln Cathedral, and eventually became Head Chorister there. He later became a bassoonist, playing in Thomas Beecham's newly-formed London Philharmonic Orchestra. In 1930, he joined the BBC Military Band, where he did much of his early conducting. It was during that time that he also began to compose. During World War II, Vinter played in The Central Band of the RAF and later led several other RAF bands. He was conductor of the BBC Midland Light Orchestra, and the first principal conductor of the BBC Concert Orchestra, from 1952 to 1953.

In 1960, The Daily Herald newspaper and sponsors of brass band contests, commissioned Vinter to write his first major work for brass band, the result of which was Salute to Youth.

Vinter was an adjudicator at the British Open Championships at Belle Vue, Manchester, in 1969 where his Spectrum was the test piece. Midway through the contest, however, he was forced to retire from 'the box' due to his failing health. His position at the contest on the day was taken by Tom F Atkinson.

Vinter died in Tintagel, aged 60.

== Major works ==
Vinter wrote a number of works for brass band, including:

- Challenging Brass (1966)
- Variations on a Ninth (1964)
- The Trumpets (1964)
- Triumphant Rhapsody (1965)
- Centenary March (1968)
- Dover Coach (1964)
- Portuguese Party (1965)
- Symphony of Marches (1963)
- John O'Gaunt (1967)
- James Cook - Circumnavigator (1968)
- Spectrum (1969)
- Salute to Youth (1961)
- Entertainments (1968 for Brass Band)
- Lisbon Carnival (1965)
- Simon Called Peter (1963)
- Vizcaya (1967)

Vinter's other works include three brass quartets:

- Elegy and Rondo (written at the request of the GUS (Footwear) Band Quartet to play at the 1966 National Brass Quartet Championship)
- Fancy's Knell (written for the 1967 Championship)
- Alla Burlesca (written for the 1968 Championship).

Preceded by (no predecessor)	Principal Conductor, BBC Concert Orchestra; 1952–1953	Succeeded by Charles Mackerras
