= Karjasilta =

District of Oulu, Finland

Coordinates: 65.0017°N 25.4939°E

- District of Oulu
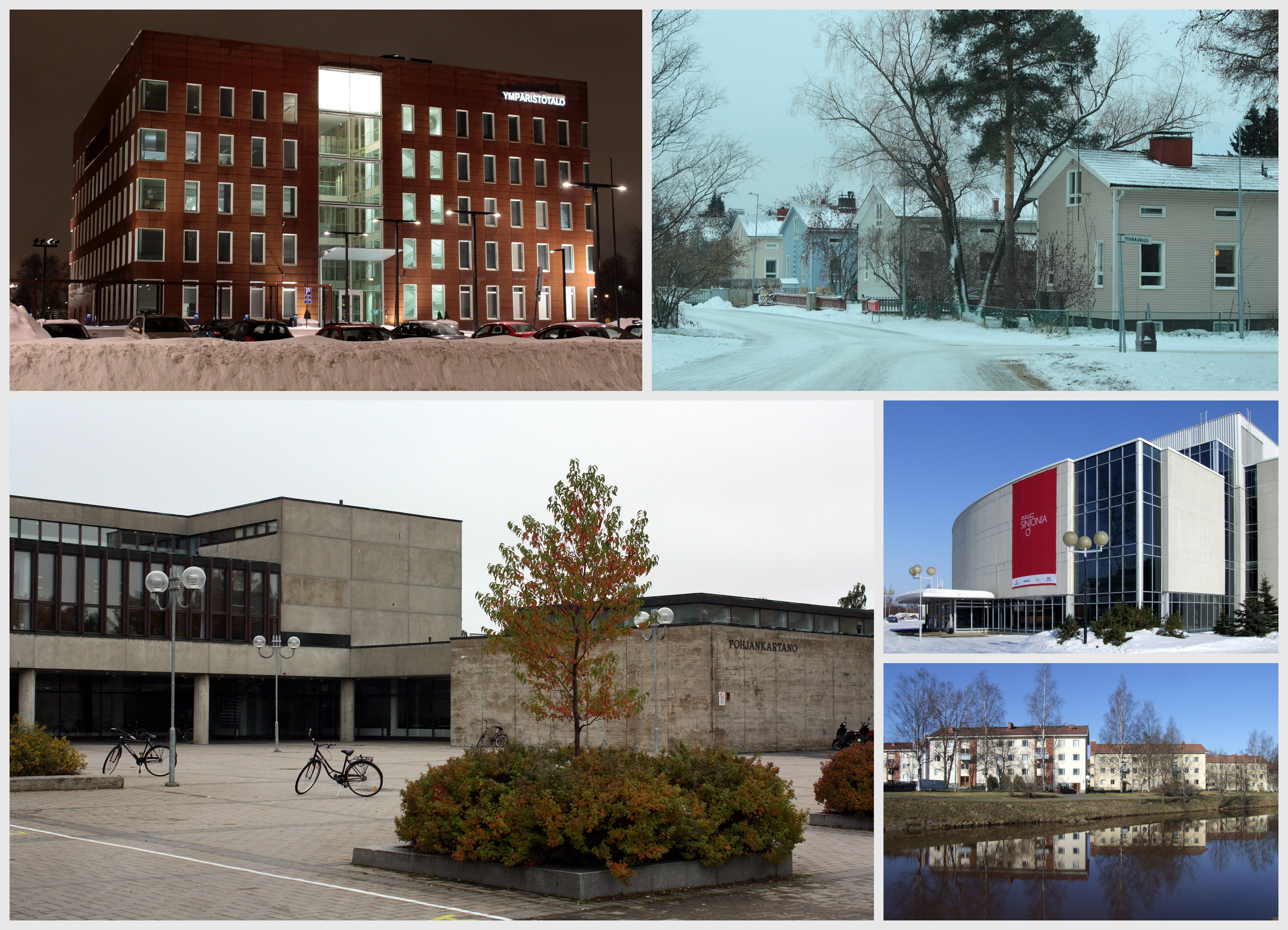
- Interactive map of Karjasilta
- Country: Finland
- City: Oulu
- Areas of Oulu: Höyhtyä area

Population (2014)
  - Total: 3 151
- Postal code: 90140

Karjasilta is a district in the Höyhtyä area in the city of Oulu, Finland. The district close to the city centre is bordered by the Raksila district to the north, Finnish national road 4 to the east, the Vanhatulli and Limingantulli districts to the west and the Nokela and Höyhtyä districts to the south.

Karjasilta is mainly a residential area with detached housing and apartment blocks built in the 1940s and 1950s. Most of the district's residential area is taken up by simple wooden houses built for the World War II veterans. Karjasilta was voted as the best neighbourhood to live in Finland in 2009. Oulu Music Centre, the primary concert venue for the Oulu Symphony Orchestra, and the Pohjankartano school complex are located on the east side of the Leevi Madetoja street, while most of the other commercial and public services are located on the west side of the street. There is also a small scale industrial area in the southwest of Karjasilta.
