= Nicholas Kraemer =

British harpsichordist and conductor (born 1945)

Nicholas Kraemer (born 7 March 1945, in Edinburgh, Scotland) is a British harpsichordist and conductor.

== Career ==
Kraemer began his career as a harpsichordist. From playing continuo (on a harpsichord) at the back of an orchestra he proceeded to the front where he began directing from the harpsichord, notably the English Chamber Orchestra in the 1970s, where his repertoire widened, taking in the 19th and 20th centuries as well as Baroque music.

Kraemer has served as artistic director of the Irish Chamber Orchestra, the London Bach Orchestra, the music programme of the Bath Festival and English Touring Opera (then Opera 80). He founded and directed the Raglan Baroque Players. From 1971 to 1988 he was musical director of the W11 Opera children's opera, which he co-founded. He currently holds the positions of Principal Guest Conductor of the Manchester Camerata, Principal Guest Conductor of Music of the Baroque, Chicago and Permanent Guest Conductor of Orchester Musikkollegium Winterthur.
