= Gábor Takács-Nagy =

Hungarian violinist and conductor (born 1956)

- Born: 17 April 1956 (age 70); Budapest
- Education: Franz Liszt Academy of Music
- Occupations: Violinist, conductor
- Website: gabortakacsnagy.com

Gábor Takács-Nagy (born 17 April 1956 in Budapest) is a Hungarian violinist and conductor. He began violin studies at age 8. He attended the Franz Liszt Academy of Music, where he won the Jenő Hubay prize. His teachers at the Liszt Academy included Ferenc Rados, András Mihály, and György Kurtág.

In 1975, Takács-Nagy, Károly Schranz, Gábor Ormai and András Fejér founded the Takács Quartet. The quartet recorded for the Hungaroton and Decca labels. Takács-Nagy left the group in 1992 after developing hand stress, which forced him to stop playing the violin, and personal tensions arose within the quartet after it emigrated from Hungary to the United States. After he left the quartet, Takács-Nagy underwent musical therapy and resumed playing the violin.

In 1996, Takács-Nagy founded the Takács Piano Trio with Dénes Várjon (piano) and Péter Szabo (cello). He also became concertmaster of the Budapest Festival Orchestra. In 1997, he joined the faculty of the Conservatoire de Musique de Genève as Professor of String Quartet. In 1998, he established the Mikrokosmos String Quartet with Zoltán Tuska (second violin), Sándor Papp (viola) and Miklós Perényi (cello).

Takács-Nagy also developed an interest in conducting. In 2005, he formed the string orchestra Camerata Bellerive, as a resident ensemble at the Festival de Bellerive in Geneva, where he has served as co-artistic director. In 2007, he became music director of the Verbier Festival Chamber Orchestra and principal guest conductor of the Hungarian State Symphony and of the MÁV Symphony Orchestra. In 2010, he became chief conductor and artistic director of the MÁV Symphony Orchestra. He became principal guest conductor of the Budapest Festival Orchestra effective with the 2012/2013 season.

In 2010, the Manchester Camerata announced Takács-Nagy's appointment as its fifth principal conductor (and Music Director), effective with the 2011–12 season. Since then, he has recorded with the Manchester Camerata commercially for the Avie label and more recently for Chandos Records. For Chandos, Manchester Camerata and Takács-Nagy have embarked on a multi-year project to perform and record all of Mozart's piano concertos with pianist Jean-Efflam Bavouzet at Chetham's School of Music's concert venue, The Stoller Hall.

He became a principal artistic partner of the Irish Chamber Orchestra in 2013.

Takács-Nagy has held the International Chair in Chamber Music at the Royal Northern College of Music. He married Lesley de Senger (née Townson), a native of Burnley, in 1991. They have two daughters.

Cultural offices
Preceded by Tamás Gál	Chief conductor and artistic director, MÁV Symphony Orchestra; 2010–2012	Succeeded by Péter Csaba
Preceded by Douglas Boyd	Principal conductor, Manchester Camerata; 2011–present	Incumbent
