= Takács Quartet =

Hungarian-American string quartet (1975-)

The Takács Quartet is a string quartet founded in Budapest, Hungary, and now based in Boulder, Colorado, United States.

== History ==
In 1975, four students at the Franz Liszt Academy of Music in Budapest, Gábor Takács-Nagy (first violin), Károly Schranz (second violin), Gábor Ormai (viola), and András Fejér (cello) formed the Takács Quartet. Takács-Nagy, Ormai and Fejér had been playing trios together for several months when they met Schranz during a pickup soccer game after classes. With his immediate addition to the group, the trio became a quartet.

The quartet first received international attention in 1977, winning the First Prize and the Critics' Prize at the International String Quartet Competition in Évian-les-Bains, France. After that, the quartet won the Gold Medal at the 1979 Portsmouth and Bordeaux Competitions and First Prizes at the Budapest International String Quartet Competition in 1978 and the Bratislava Competition in 1981. The quartet made its first North American tour in 1982.

In 1983, the group decided it would be best for them and their families if they moved to the United States. A colleague offered them a position as quartet-in-residence at the University of Colorado at Boulder, and they accepted the job.

In 1993, Takács-Nagy left the group, and the British violinist Edward Dusinberre replaced him. In 1994, Ormai learned that he had incurable cancer, and was replaced by another British musician, violist Roger Tapping. Following these changes, the quartet embarked on a successful series of recordings: a cycle of all six Béla Bartók quartets (dedicated to the memory of Ormai, who died in 1995) and a critically acclaimed complete Ludwig van Beethoven quartet cycle, as well as quartets by Bedřich Smetana and Alexander Borodin.

In 2005, following the completion of the Beethoven cycle, Tapping retired from the group to spend more time with his family. He joined the faculty at Juilliard, and played with the Juilliard Quartet until his death in 2022. His replacement was Geraldine Walther, an American violist who until then had been principal violist of the San Francisco Symphony. The quartet's members and critics remarked on how quickly she fit into the ensemble.

Also in 2005, the quartet became associate artists at the South Bank Centre. In 2006, they released their first recording with Walther, of Franz Schubert's Rosamunde and Death and the Maiden quartets. This was also their first recording with Hyperion Records, after switching from the Decca label.

Schranz retired from the quartet in 2018 and was replaced by University of Colorado faculty member Harumi Rhodes.

In 2019, violist Walther announced her retirement from the quartet. She was replaced in 2020 by American violist Richard O'Neill. In fall 2025, the quartet's last remaining original member, András Fejér, announced his retirement at the end of the 2025-2026 season. He will be replaced by Mihai Marica.

== Current members ==
- Edward Dusinberre, first violin (since 1993)
- Harumi Rhodes, second violin (since 2018)
- Richard O'Neill, viola (since 2020)
- Mihai Marica, cello (since 2026)

== Past members ==
Years	First violin	Second violin	Viola	Cello
1975-1993	Gábor Takács-Nagy	Károly Schranz	Gábor Ormai	András Fejé
1993-1994	Edward Dusinberre	Károly Schranz	Gábor Ormai	András Fejé
1994-2005	Edward Dusinberre	Károly Schranz	Roger Tapping	András Fejé
2005-2018	Edward Dusinberre	Károly Schranz	Geraldine Walther	András Fejé
2018-2020	Edward Dusinberre	Harumi Rhodes	Geraldine Walther	András Fejé
2020-2026	Edward Dusinberre	Harumi Rhodes	Richard O'Neill	András Fejé
2026-date	Edward Dusinberre	Harumi Rhodes	Richard O'Neill	Mihai Marica

== Awards and recognition ==
Grammy Award for Best Chamber Music Performance: Andrew Keener (producer), Simon Dominic Eadon (engineer) and the Takács Quartet for Beethoven: String Quartets ("Razumovsky" Op. 59, 1–3; "Harp" Op. 74) (2003)

The New Yorker critic Alex Ross wrote that the quartet's complete Beethoven quartets "stands as the most richly expressive modern account of this titanic cycle".

The Takács Quartet's interpretation of Bartók's six string quartets has been praised.

The quartet was nominated for a Grammy Award for Best Chamber Music Performance for its recording of Johannes Brahms's String Quartet, Op. 51, No. 2, on the Hyperion label.

In 2010, the quartet was honored for Excellence in Research and Creative Work by the Boulder Faculty Assembly at the University of Colorado.

== Selected discography ==
- Bartók: The Six String Quartets (Decca 289 455 297-2) (1998). Gramophone Award Winner, Best Chamber Music Recording
- Beethoven: The Early Quartets: Op. 18, Nos. 1–6 (Decca 000186402) (2004)
- Beethoven: The Late Quartets: Op. 95; Op. 127; Op. 130; Op. 131; Op. 132; Op. 133; Op. 135 (Decca 000387502) (2005)
- Beethoven: The three "Rasumovsky" Quartets, Op. 59; the "Harp" Quartet, Op. 74 (Decca 470 847-2 3 DH2) (2002). Grammy Award Winner, Best Chamber Music Recording & Gramophone Award Winner, Best Chamber Music Recording
- Borodin: String Quartet No. 2 in D Major (Decca 452 239-2)
- Brahms: String Quartets Op. 51, Nos. 1 and 2 (Decca 425 526-2) (2003)
- Brahms: String Quartet, Op. 67; Piano Quintet Op. 34 with András Schiff (Decca 430 529-2)
- Chausson: Concert for piano, violin and string quartet in D major, Op. 21 with Joshua Bell and Jean-Yves Thibaudet (Decca 000444702) (2005)
- Dvořák: String Quartet Op. 96 "American"; String Quartet, Op. 105; Five Bagatelles (Decca 47430 077-2)
- Dvořák: String Quartet in E-flat Major, Op. 51; Piano Quintet in A Major, Op. 81 with Andreas Haefliger (Decca 289 66197-2) (1999)
- Haydn: String Quartets Op. 76, Nos. 1–3 (Decca 421 360-2)
- Haydn: String Quartets Op. 76, Nos. 4–6 (Decca 425 467-2)
- Haydn: String Quartets Op. 77, Nos. 1 and 2; String Quartet, Op. 103 (Decca 430 199-2)
- Mozart: String Quintet in C Major, K. 515; String Quintet in G minor, K. 516; Adagio and Fugue in C minor, K. 546 with György Pauk (Decca 430 772-2) (1993)
- Schubert: String Quartet in A minor, D. 804 Rosamunde; String Quartet in D minor D. 810 Death and the Maiden (Decca 436 843-2) (1993)
- Schubert: String Quartet in A minor, D. 804 Rosamunde; String Quartet in D minor D. 810 Death and the Maiden (Hyperion CDA67585) (2006)
- Schubert: String Quintet in C Major, D. 956 (with Miklós Perényi); Quartettsatz in C minor, D. 703 (Decca 436 324-2)
- Schubert: String Quartet in G Major D. 887; Notturno with Andreas Haefliger, (Decca 452 854-2) (2003)
- Smetana: String Quartet No. 1 in E minor "From My Life" (Decca 452 239-2) (2003)
- Smetana: String Quartet No. 1 in E minor "From My Life" & Janáček, String Quartets No. 1 ("The Kreutzer Sonata") and No. 2 ("Intimate Letters"); Hypérion A67997 (2015)

== Selected concert reviews ==
- Review from Wigmore Hall by Tom Service, The Guardian, 30 November 1999.
- Tom Service, review from Wigmore Hall, London, July 2001. The Guardian, 6 July 2001.
- Rian Evans, review from Assembly Rooms, Bath. The Guardian, 13 November 2002.
- Rian Evans, review from St George's, Bristol. The Guardian, 19 May 2004.
- Tom Service, review from Wigmore Hall. The Guardian, 10 May 2005.
- George Hall, review from Queen Elizabeth Hall. The Guardian, 15 November 2005.
- Review from Queen Elizabeth Hall by Martin Kettle, The Guardian, 26 February 2007.
