= Andrew Mogrelia =

Music conductor

Andrew Mogrelia is a British conductor with a varied career conducting symphonic works, ballets and a large discography for the Naxos label.

== Career ==
Andrew Mogrelia was Conductor-in-Residence at Birmingham Conservatoire, United Kingdom, from 1992 to 2002, and music director of the San Francisco Ballet from 2003 to 2005. He was, from 2005-2012, Music Director of the San Francisco Conservatory of Music Orchestra. And, after serving as the Principal Guest Conductor of the Queensland Ballet from 2009-2013, he was promoted to Music Director and Principal Conductor for that ensemble from 2013-2015.

Mogrelia has conducted many orchestras around the world, including the Royal Philharmonic, BBC Symphony, BBC Scottish Symphony, Residentie Orchestra, Dutch Radio Symphony, Slovak Radio Symphony and Slovak Philharmonic. As a ballet conductor, he has worked with such companies as the English National Ballet, Dutch National Ballet, Nederlands Dans Theater, Birmingham Royal Ballet, Finnish National Ballet, Norwegian National Ballet, both Australian and West Australian Ballet, Hong Kong Ballet, and the American Ballet Theatre.

He has recorded dozens of CDs for the Amadis, Marco Polo and Naxos record labels, with works by Handel, Suk, Vieuxtemps and others.
