= John Carewe =

British conductor (born 1933)

John Carewe (born 24 January 1933) is a British conductor and teacher.

== Biography ==
Very early in his student career at the Guildhall School of Music, Carewe gave up his original intention of being a composer and turned to conducting. His teachers, nevertheless, were all composers: Walter Goehr and Max Deutsch (both Schoenberg pupils), Messiaen (with whom he studied in Paris on a French Government scholarship) and Pierre Boulez.

In 1958, he founded the New Music Ensemble and gave many British premieres of music by composers including Birtwistle, Boulez, Bennett, Maxwell Davies, and appeared at most of the major British festivals, including the BBC Proms. He was one of the three conductors in the first British performance of Stockhausen’s Gruppen, given in Glasgow in 1960.

In 1966, at the invitation of Sir William Glock, Carewe became principal conductor of the BBC Welsh Orchestra, and held the post until 1971. From 1974 to 1986, Carewe was music director of the Brighton Philharmonic Orchestra. He was principal conductor of The Fires of London between 1980 and 1984.

In 1988, Carewe gave the world premiere of Elliott Carter's Oboe Concerto with Heinz Holliger. In 1996, he was involved with Sir Simon Rattle and Daniel Harding in six performances of Gruppen in Birmingham, London and Vienna.

From 1993 to 1996, Carewe was Generalmusikdirektor (General Music Director) of the Chemnitz Opera, which encompassed its resident orchestra, the Robert-Schumann-Philharmonie.

Carewe's pupils have included Sir Simon Rattle. He frequently worked with the Bundesjugendorchester and taught conducting at both the Royal Academy of Music and the Royal College of Music in London. He has served on the jury of the Gustav Mahler Conducting Competition.

Carewe's recordings include Debussy's Pelléas et Mélisande (recorded in 1988 after performances at Nice Opera), and Milhaud's La Création du Monde and Stravinsky's The Soldier's Tale (recorded with a chamber ensemble from the London Symphony Orchestra).

Carewe has two daughters, Mary, a vocalist, and Anna, a cellist.

Cultural offices
Preceded by Rae Jenkins	Principal Conductor, BBC Welsh Orchestra; 1966–1971	Succeeded by Boris Brott
Preceded by Herbert Menges	Principal Conductor, Brighton Philharmonic Orchestra; 1974–1986	Succeeded by Barry Wordsworth
Preceded by Dieter-Gerhardt Worm	Generalmusikdirektor, Theater Chemnitz; 1993–1996	Succeeded by Oleg Caetani
