= Manchester Camerata =

English chamber orchestra

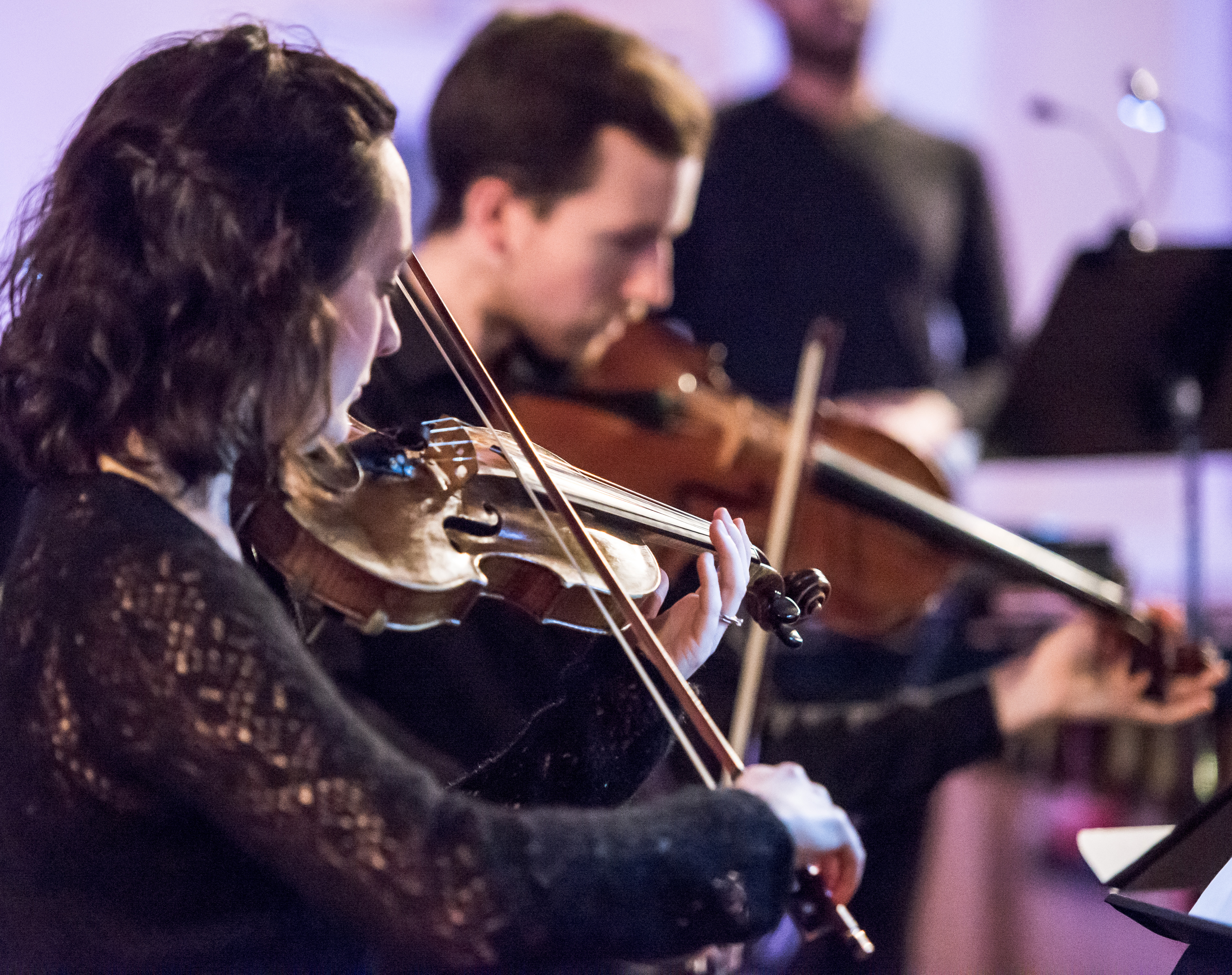
The Manchester Camerata performing at the University of Salford in 2015.

The Manchester Camerata is a British chamber orchestra based in Manchester, England. A sub-group from the orchestra, the Manchester Camerata Ensemble, specialises in chamber music performances.

The orchestra's primary concert venue is The Bridgewater Hall. It also presents concerts at the Royal Northern College of Music. In addition, the orchestra gives run-out and residency concerts in various towns and cities in the North of England, including Kingston upon Hull, Sheffield, Leeds, Kendal, Whitby, Keswick, Bradford, Stamford, Crewe, Colne, Stafford and Ulverston. The orchestra appeared annually at the Rasiguères Festival of Music and Wine, held near Perpignan, France, which Moura Lympany established in 1981.

In 1972, Raph Gonley, a music producer at BBC Radio Manchester, founded the orchestra. Gonley ran the Camerata until 1975. Funding for the Camerata after its initial period came from the Greater Manchester Council. The Camerata became an autonomous organisation in 1979.

The Camerata's first principal conductor was Frank Cliff, who served from 1972 to 1977. Subsequent principal conductors have included Szymon Goldberg, Manoug Parikian, Nicholas Braithwaite, and Sachio Fujioka. Braithwaite had also been principal guest conductor of the orchestra from 1977 to 1984. Douglas Boyd was principal conductor of the orchestra from 2001 to 2011. In March 2010, the orchestra announced the appointment of Gábor Takács-Nagy as the orchestra's newest principal conductor, effective September 2011. Nicholas Kraemer serves as the Camerata's permanent guest conductor.

The orchestra has recorded commercially for the Avie Records label, conducted by Boyd and by Takács-Nagy.

Bob Riley is the orchestra's current chief executive.

In 2021, the Manchester Camerata moved into a new home at Gorton Monastery, a large Victorian church built in 1872 by the noted Gothic Revival architect Edward Welby Pugin.

== Principal conductors ==
- Frank Cliff (1972–1977)
- Szymon Goldberg (1977–1980)
- Manoug Parikian (1980–1984)
- Nicholas Braithwaite (1984–1991)
- Sachio Fujioka (1995–2000)
- Douglas Boyd (2001–2011)
- Gábor Takács-Nagy (2011–present)
