= Guelph Spring Festival =

The Guelph Spring Festival (GSF) was an annual music festival held during the months of April and May in Guelph, Ontario, Canada. It was founded in 1968 by the Edward Johnson Music Foundation. The festival presented concerts and operas to the public, and also includes master classes, seminars, and music competitions for professional musicians. After the 2006 festival, the GSF ceased following the bankruptcy of the Edward Johnson Music Foundation in the fall of 2006.
