= Brighton Philharmonic Orchestra =

Orchestra in Brighton, England

- Symphony orchestra
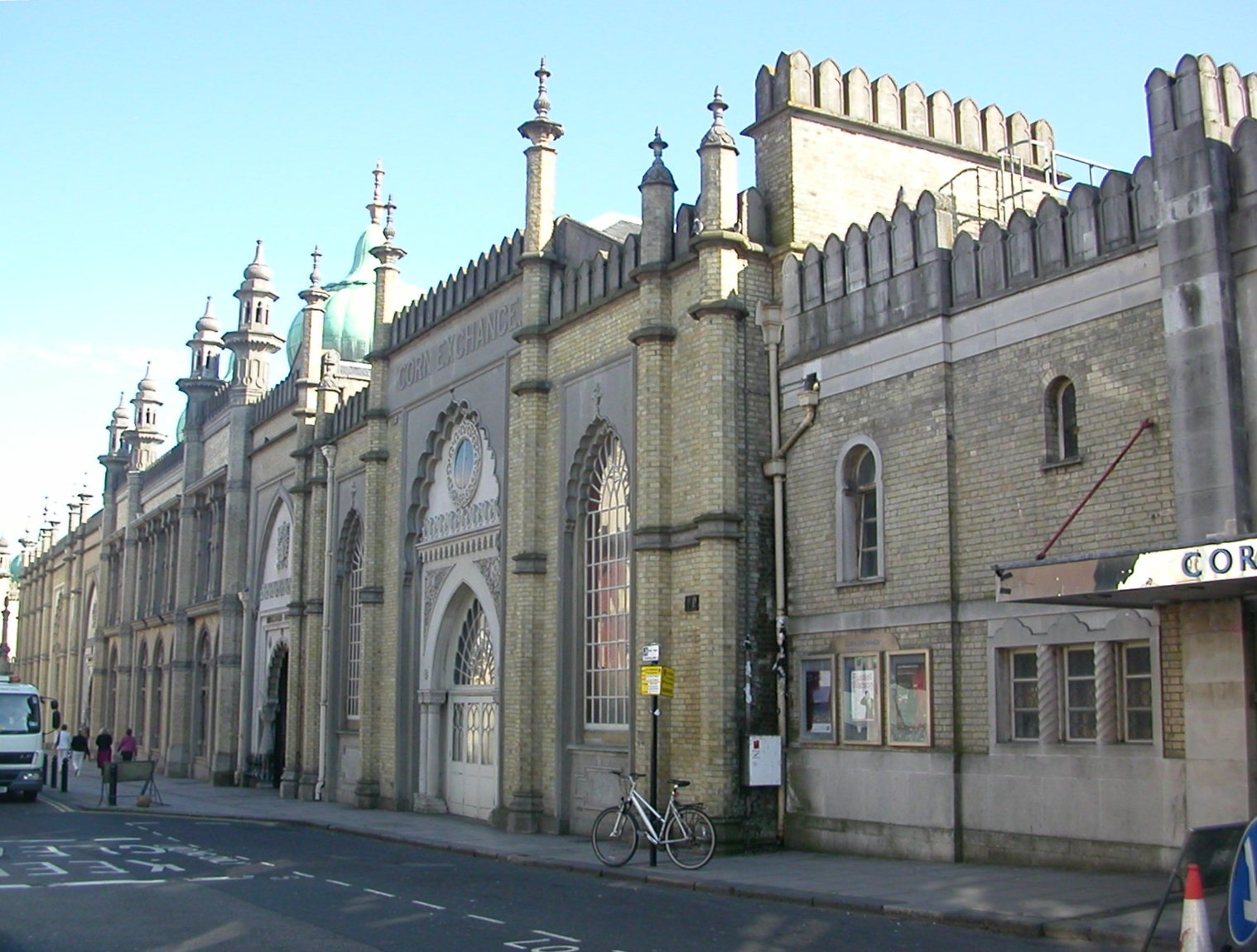
- Brighton Dome, home of the orchestra
- Former name: Symphonic String Players; Symphonic Players
- Founded: 1925
- Location: Brighton, England
- Concert hall: Brighton Dome
- Principal conductor: Joanna MacGregor
- Music director: Joanna MacGregor
- Website: brightonphil.org.uk

Brighton Philharmonic Orchestra (BPO) is a professional orchestra based in Brighton and Hove. Founded in 1925, it performs regularly at Brighton Dome and other venues across Sussex and London.

== History ==
=== Early years ===
In May 1925, Herbert Menges and his mother Kate formed the Symphonic String Players. The orchestra initially performed in Hove Town Hall with Molly Paley as the first leader. By 1928, the orchestra had moved to Brighton Dome and had adopted the name Symphonic Players. The Dome, originally riding stables, had been converted into a concert hall in 1867. Menges continued as Principal Conductor after a new president was appointed. Performers during this period included Joseph Szigeti, Sergei Rachmaninoff, Henry Wood, Adrian Boult, Moura Lympany, Myra Hess and Clifford Curzon.

=== 1940s to 1980s ===
During World War II, the Symphonic Players put on regular concerts, sometimes in conjunction with the London Philharmonic Orchestra under the leadership of Malcolm Sargent. In 1942 they organised a week-long music festival at which many soloists of the era performed, as did the Bournemouth Symphony Orchestra. In 1945, the orchestra moved from featuring amateur musicians to professionals and changed its name. "An ambitious scheme for its future development" was proposed and was accepted by Brighton Borough Council, which agreed to provide £1,000 to cover any losses made. The same amount came from the lessees of Brighton Racecourse, and the Arts Council of Great Britain also provided funding. At this time the orchestra travelled to other towns on many occasions, giving concerts at Eastbourne, Hastings, Portsmouth, Southampton, Folkestone and Swindon. Ralph Vaughan Williams took over the position of President in 1947, and the orchestra had guest appearances from Malcolm Sargent, Yehudi Menuhin, Rosalyn Tureck, Norman Del Mar and William Walton.

In 1958 the name Brighton Philharmonic Orchestra was adopted. In 1967 the orchestra appointed Benjamin Britten as President, with concerts including Jacqueline du Pré, Alfred Brendel, André Previn, Brighton Festival Chorus and Mstislav Rostropovich. This was despite "a succession of financial crises" which were averted by funding received from the Arts Council, Brighton Borough Council and Southern Television, the local ITV broadcasting licence holder. The orchestra was also one of several that performed at the inaugural Brighton Festival in 1967.

Menges, the principle conductor in 1972 died and was replaced by John Carewe.

=== 1980 to present ===
The orchestra celebrated its 90th concert season in 2014/15, including a performance of Franz Schubert's Marche Militaire, which was performed at the Symphonic String Players' first concert in May 1925. Wordsworth stepped down at the end of the season and became the BPO's first Conductor Laureate.

In 2019, Joanna MacGregor CBE became Music Director and began conducting the orchestra as principal. In 2024/25 the orchestra celebrated its Centenary season, with guest appearances from Evelyn Glennie and Jess Gillam and culminating in a gala performance of Messiaen's Turangalîla Symphony.

== Bibliography ==
- Carder, Timothy (1990). The Encyclopaedia of Brighton. Lewes: East Sussex County Libraries. ISBN 0-861-47315-9.
- Chapman, Brigid (1996). Brighton in the Fifties. Lewes: The Book Guild. ISBN 1-85776-151-0.
- Musgrave, Clifford (1981). Life in Brighton. Rochester: Rochester Press. ISBN 0-571-09285-3.
