= András Fejér =

Hungarian cellist

András Fejér (born 1955) is a Hungarian cellist. He is a member of the Takács Quartet, having founded it with three classmates at the Franz Liszt Academy of Music in Budapest in 1975.

He was born into a musical family and became familiar with the chamber music repertoire at an early age, as his parents would spend the weekends playing music with their friends. András himself began playing the cello at age seven, and legend has it that he originally wanted to play violin, but his father, unwilling to listen to the terrible scratching sounds produced by beginning violinists, forbade it.

In 1974, he entered the Franz Liszt Academy of Music, where he studied with Ede Banda, András Mihály, Ferenc Rados and György Kurtág. Notably, he studied Bartok’s music with the violinist Zoltán Székely, to whom Bartok dedicated his Second Violin Concerto. In 1982, he and his colleagues in the Takács Quartet moved to Boulder, Colorado and took up the position of quartet-in-residence at the University of Colorado Boulder.
