= List of symphony orchestras =

This is a list of symphony orchestras that includes orchestras with established notability. The orchestras of Europe have a separate list. A list of youth orchestras can be found at List of youth orchestras.

== Africa ==
=== Algeria ===
- Algiers International Philharmonic Orchestra

=== Democratic Republic of the Congo ===
- Orchestre Symphonique Kimbanguiste

=== Egypt ===
- Cairo Symphony Orchestra

=== Ghana ===
- National Symphony Orchestra Ghana
- Pan-African Orchestra

=== Kenya ===
- Nairobi Orchestra
- Kenya National Youth Orchestra
- Safaricom Youth Orchestra
- Kenya Conservatoire Symphony Orchestra

=== Morocco ===
- Moroccan Philharmonic Orchestra

=== South Africa ===
- Cape Town Philharmonic Orchestra
- Johannesburg Philharmonic Orchestra
- Johannesburg Youth Orchestra
- KwaZulu-Natal Philharmonic Orchestra
- South African National Youth Orchestra Foundation
- Mzansi National Philharmonic Orchestra

=== Tunisia ===
- Tunisian Symphony Orchestra

== North America and the Caribbean ==
=== Canada ===
- Calgary Philharmonic Orchestra
- Edmonton Symphony Orchestra
- Esprit Orchestra
- Hamilton Philharmonic Orchestra
- I Musici de Montréal Chamber Orchestra
- Kingston Symphony
- Kitchener–Waterloo Symphony
- Manitoba Chamber Orchestra
- Montreal Symphony Orchestra (Orchestre symphonique de Montréal)
- Montreal Youth Symphony Orchestra (Orchestre symphonique des jeunes de Montréal)
- National Arts Centre Orchestra
- Niagara Symphony Orchestra
- Oakville Symphony Orchestra
- Orchestra London Canada (now London Symphonia)
- Orchestre de la Francophonie
- Orchestre Métropolitain
- Orchestre Symphonique de Québec (Quebec Symphony Orchestra)
- Ottawa Symphony Orchestra
- Regina Symphony Orchestra
- Saskatoon Symphony Orchestra
- Saskatoon Youth Orchestra
- Sherbrooke Symphony Orchestra (Orchestre Symphonique de Sherbrooke)
- Symphony Nova Scotia
- Thunder Bay Symphony Orchestra
- Tafelmusik Baroque Orchestra
- Toronto Symphony Orchestra
- Toronto Symphony Youth Orchestra
- Vancouver Symphony Orchestra
- Vancouver Youth Symphony Orchestra
- Victoria Symphony
- Winnipeg Symphony Orchestra
- Windsor Symphony Orchestra

=== Cuba ===
- National Symphony Orchestra of Cuba

=== Mexico ===
- Orquesta de Baja California
- Orquesta Filarmónica de Jalisco (Jalisco Philharmonic Orchestra)
- Mexico City Philharmonic Orchestra (Orquesta Filarmónica de la Ciudad de México)
- Orquesta Filarmónica del Estado de Querétaro
- Xalapa Symphony Orchestra (Orquesta Sinfónica de Xalapa)
- Orquesta Sinfónica de Yucatán
- Orquesta Sinfónica del Estado de México
- National Symphony Orchestra (Orquesta Sinfónica Nacional)

=== Puerto Rico ===
- Puerto Rico Symphony Orchestra (Orquesta Sinfónica de Puerto Rico)

=== Trinidad and Tobago ===
- St Augustine Chamber Orchestra

== South and Central America ==
- The Orchestra of the Americas

=== Argentina ===
- Argentine National Symphony Orchestra
- Buenos Aires Philharmonic
- Juan de Dios Filiberto National Orchestra of Argentine Music
- Olavarria Symphony Orchestra (Orquesta Sinfónica Municipal de Olavarría)

=== Bolivia ===
- Oruro Symphony Orchestra

=== Brazil ===
- Amazonas Philharmonic
- Brazilian Symphony Orchestra
- Orquestra Lira Sanjoanense
- Orquestra Ribeiro Bastos
- Porto Alegre Symphony Orchestra
- São Paulo State Symphony Orchestra
- São Paulo Municipal Symphony Orchestra

=== Colombia ===
- Bogotá Philharmonic Orchestra
- Cali Philharmonic Orchestra
- National Symphony Orchestra of Colombia

=== Peru ===
- National Symphony Orchestra

=== Venezuela ===
- Grand Marshal of Ayacucho Symphony Orchestra
- Mérida State Symphony Orchestra
- Simón Bolívar Symphony Orchestra
- Venezuela Symphony Orchestra

== Asia ==
=== Pan-Asia ===
- Asian Youth Orchestra
- Arab Youth Philharmonic Orchestra
- West–Eastern Divan Orchestra

=== Armenia ===
- Armenian State Symphony Orchestra
- Armenian Philharmonic Orchestra

=== Azerbaijan ===
- Azerbaijan State Chamber Orchestra
- Azerbaijan State Orchestra of Folk Instruments
- Azerbaijan State Symphony Orchestra

=== Cambodia ===
- Angkor National Youth Orchestra

=== China ===
- Beijing Symphony Orchestra
- Central Philharmonic Orchestra
- China National Symphony Orchestra
- China NCPA Orchestra
- China Philharmonic Orchestra
- Guangzhou Symphony Orchestra
- Guiyang Symphony Orchestra
- Hangzhou Philharmonic Orchestra
- Harbin Symphony Orchestra
- National Ballet of China Symphony Orchestra
- Qingdao Symphony Orchestra
- Shanghai Chinese Orchestra
- Shanghai City Symphony Orchestra
- Shanghai Philharmonic Orchestra
- Shanghai Symphony Orchestra
- Shenzhen Symphony Orchestra
- Sichuan Symphony Orchestra
- Xiamen Philharmonic Orchestra

=== Georgia ===
- Georgian Philharmonic Orchestra

=== Hong Kong ===
- City Chamber Orchestra of Hong Kong
- Pan Asia Symphony Orchestra
- Hong Kong Chamber Orchestra
- Hong Kong Festival Orchestra
- Hong Kong Philharmonic Orchestra
- Hong Kong Sinfonietta
- Metropolitan Youth Orchestra of Hong Kong

=== India ===
- India National Youth Orchestra
- Symphony Orchestra of India
- Calcutta Chamber Orchestra

=== Indonesia ===
- Jakarta Philharmonic Orchestra
- Jakarta Simfonia Orchestra
- Jakarta City Philharmonic
- Jakarta Metropolitan Orchestra
- Jakarta Concert Orchestra
- Jakarta Sinfonietta
- Amadeus Symphony Orchestra
- Surabaya Symphony Orchestra

=== Iran ===
- National Orchestra
- Tehran Symphony Orchestra
- Iranian Orchestra for New Music
- Melal Orchestra

=== Israel ===
- Israel Philharmonic Orchestra
- Jerusalem Symphony Orchestra
- Rishon LeZion Orchestra (see also Rishon LeZion Orchestra on the Hebrew WP)

=== Japan ===
- Hiroshima Symphony Orchestra
- Hyogo Performing Arts Center Orchestra
- Japan Philharmonic Orchestra
- Kanagawa Philharmonic Orchestra
- Nagoya Philharmonic Orchestra
- New Japan Philharmonic
- NHK Symphony Orchestra, Tokyo
- Orchestra Ensemble Kanazawa
- Osaka Philharmonic Orchestra
- Saito Kinen Orchestra
- Sapporo Symphony Orchestra
- Tokyo Metropolitan Symphony Orchestra
- Tokyo Philharmonic Orchestra
- Tokyo Symphony Orchestra
- Yomiuri Nippon Symphony Orchestra

=== Lebanon ===
- Lebanese National Symphony Orchestra

=== Macau ===
- Macao Orchestra

=== Malaysia ===
- Malaysian Philharmonic Orchestra
- Malaysian Philharmonic Youth Orchestra
- KLPac Orchestra
- Penang Philharmonic Orchestra
- Selangor Philharmonic Orchestra
- Selangor Symphony Orchestra

=== Mongolia ===
- Mongolian Symphony Orchestra

=== Myanmar ===
- Myanmar National Symphony Orchestra

=== North Korea ===
- State Symphony Orchestra of the Democratic People's Republic of Korea

=== Philippines ===
- ABS-CBN Philharmonic Orchestra
- De La Salle Zobel Symphony Orchestra
- Manila Symphony Orchestra
- Manila Philharmonic Orchestra
- Philippine Philharmonic Orchestra
- San Miguel Philharmonic Orchestra

=== Qatar ===
- Qatar Philharmonic Orchestra

=== Russia ===
- Mariinsky Theatre Orchestra
- Moscow Chamber Orchestra
- Moscow City Symphony
- Moscow Philharmonic Orchestra
- Moscow State Symphony Orchestra
- Moscow Symphony Orchestra
- Moscow Virtuosi
- Murmansk Philharmonic Orchestra
- National Philharmonic of Russia
- Novosibirsk Youth Symphony Orchestra
- Osipov State Russian Folk Orchestra
- Persimfans
- Russian National Orchestra
- Russian Philharmonic Orchestra
- Sochi Symphony Orchestra
- Saint Petersburg Academic Symphony Orchestra
- Saint Petersburg Philharmonic Orchestra
- State Academic Symphony Orchestra of the Russian Federation
- State Symphony Capella of Russia
- State Symphony Cinema Orchestra
- Tchaikovsky Symphony Orchestra
- Ural Philharmonic Orchestra

=== Singapore ===
- Braddell Heights Symphony Orchestra
- Orchestra of the Music Makers
- Singapore Symphony Orchestra
- Singapore National Youth Orchestra

=== South Korea ===
- Bucheon Philharmonic Orchestra
- KBS Symphony Orchestra
- Seoul Philharmonic Orchestra
- Korean Symphony Orchestra
- Gwangju Symphony Orchestra

=== Sri Lanka ===
- Symphony Orchestra of Sri Lanka

=== Syria ===
- Syrian National Orchestra for Arabic Music
- Syrian National Symphony Orchestra

=== Taiwan ===
- Chamber Philharmonic Taipei
- Chimei Philharmonic Orchestra
- Evergreen Symphony Orchestra
- Kaohsiung Symphony Orchestra
- National Chinese Orchestra Taiwan
- National Symphony Orchestra (also known as Taiwan Philharmonic)
- National Taiwan Symphony Orchestra
- Taipei Century Symphony Orchestra
- Taipei Chinese Orchestra
- Taipei Philharmonic Orchestra
- Taipei Symphony Orchestra

=== Turkey ===
- Presidential Symphony Orchestra
- İzmir State Symphony Orchestra
- Antalya State Symphony Orchestra
- Bilkent Symphony Orchestra
- Çukurova State Symphony Orchestra
- Turkish Republic of Northern Cyprus Presidential Symphony Orchestra
- Barış Youth Symphony Orchestra

=== Turkmenistan ===
- State Symphony Orchestra of Turkmenistan

=== Thailand ===
- Siam Philharmonic Orchestra
- Thailand Philharmonic Orchestra
- Royal Bangkok Symphony Orchestra

=== United Arab Emirates ===
- UAE Philharmonic Orchestra (previously known as Dubai Philharmonic Orchestra)

=== Vietnam ===
- Vietnam National Symphony Orchestra

== Oceania ==
=== Australia ===
- Adelaide Symphony Orchestra
- Adelaide Youth Orchestra
- Australian Chamber Orchestra
- Australian Opera and Ballet Orchestra
- Australian Youth Orchestra
- Brisbane Philharmonic Orchestra
- Canberra Symphony Orchestra
- Canberra Youth Orchestra
- Darwin Symphony Orchestra
- Eminence Symphony Orchestra
- Melbourne Symphony Orchestra
- Orchestra Victoria
- Queensland Symphony Orchestra
- Queensland Youth Orchestras
- RMIT Symphonic Orchestra
- SBS Radio and Television Youth Orchestra
- Sydney Symphony Orchestra
- Sydney University Symphony Orchestra
- Sydney Youth Orchestra
- Tasmanian Symphony Orchestra
- Western Australian Charity Orchestra
- West Australian Symphony Orchestra

=== New Zealand ===
- Auckland Symphony Orchestra
- Auckland Philharmonia Orchestra
- Christchurch Symphony Orchestra
- New Zealand Symphony Orchestra

== See also ==
- List of concert halls
- List of principal conductors by orchestra
- List of radio orchestras
