= The National Youth Orchestra =

- Youth orchestra
- Short name: NYO
- Founded: 1948
- Location: Holborn, London
- Principal conductor: Alpesh Chauhan
- Website: www.nyo.org.uk

The National Youth Orchestra (NYO), formerly the National Youth Orchestra of Great Britain, is the national youth orchestra of the United Kingdom, consisting of 164 members of ages 13 to 19 years. Auditions take place in the autumn each year at various locations in the country. The minimum standard needed to audition is ABRSM / Trinity Guildhall / London College of Music Grade 8, though it is not necessary to have taken any examinations.

== NYO organisation and past conductors ==
Ruth Railton (later Dame Ruth King) founded the National Youth Orchestra in 1948. Subsequent NYO directors have included Ivey Dickson (1966-1984), Derek Bourgeois (1984–1993), Jill White (1993–2002), and Jonathan Vaughan (2002–2007). Sarah Alexander was named the NYO's director in 2007 and is now titled CEO & Creative Director.

Each course is directed by a distinguished conductor. Walter Susskind was a founder conductor of the NYO and was the main conductor on several courses, well into the 1950s. Later in the NYO's history, Christopher Seaman was the main conductor on a number of courses. Other conductors who have worked with the NYO have included Vladimir Jurowski, Marin Alsop, Jiří Bělohlávek, Pierre Boulez, Sir Adrian Boult, Sir Malcolm Sargent, Semyon Bychkov, Paul Daniel, Sir Andrew Davis, Sir Colin Davis, Sir Mark Elder, Iván Fischer, Edward Gardner, Antonio Pappano, Hugo Rignold, Andrew Litton, Keith Lockhart, Sir Roger Norrington, Tadaaki Otaka, Geoffrey Paterson, Sir Simon Rattle, Mstislav Rostropovich and Dalia Stasevska.

In October 2025, the NYO announced the appointment of Alpesh Chauhan as its new principal conductor and musical advisor.

== Courses ==
The orchestra assembles thrice-yearly during school holidays, at New Year, Easter and Summer for two-week residential courses, coached by tutors. Their repertoire includes a wide variety of works by Romantic, 20th century and contemporary composers including James MacMillan, Thomas Adès, and most recently Julian Anderson, Judith Weir, Gabriel Prokofiev, Dani Howard and Anna Clyne. In addition to the main orchestral activity they have time to participate in a range of activities including chamber music, physical workshops, dance, singing, improvisation and establishing friendships.

Venues for their concerts include Barbican Hall, London; Symphony Hall, Birmingham; Bridgewater Hall, Manchester; The Sage Gateshead; Philharmonic Hall, Liverpool; and Royal Festival Hall, London. Every year they play in a Promenade Concert in the Royal Albert Hall to celebrate young British talent. Performances in 2011, for example, included Gabriel Prokofiev's Concerto for Turntables & Orchestra with DJ Switch, Britten's Piano Concerto and Sergei Prokofiev's Romeo & Juliet televised at the BBC Proms, Leoš Janáček's Sinfonietta (which required an enlarged brass section) conducted by Kristjan Järvi and Gustav Mahler's Symphony No. 10, in the completion by Deryck Cooke, as part of the Southbank Centre's Mahler centenary celebrations.

Contemporary music is also an important part of their repertoire. In August 2010, as part of their performance at the BBC Proms (marking the conclusion of their summer course), the orchestra gave the London premiere of British composer Julian Anderson's Fantasias, conducted by Semyon Bychkov, which had been commissioned specially for the Cleveland Orchestra (who gave the world premiere in November 2009). The NYO also gave the European premiere of the same work at Birmingham Symphony Hall.

In April 2010, the orchestra expanded to 173 players to focus on the entire orchestral works of Edgard Varèse, including the first UK performance of Varèse's Amériques, in its original version from 1921, conducted by Paul Daniel. Their concert at Royal Festival Hall was the climax of the Varèse 360° event, in which the NYO and London Sinfonietta (conducted by David Atherton) performed the entire works of Varèse over one weekend as part of the Southbank Centre's annual Ether festival. Courses also feature encounters between NYO members and younger musicians so they can pass on their passion and expertise to the next generation.

The orchestra made its debut at Young Euro Classic in 2015, returning in 2019.

== NYO Inspire ==
NYO Inspire is a programme for 13-18 year olds at Grade 6 to Grade 8 level which has been running since 2014. Similarly to The National Youth Orchestra, NYO Inspire musicians participate in music-making activities, residentials and concerts.

The programme provides free musical opportunities to teenage musicians, primarily from state school, where there’s a lack of opportunity to progress in music. The programme is also open to musicians who face other systemic challenges to accessing musical opportunities.

NYO Inspire musicians develop their skills on the programme through playing in their instrument groups and as part of a full orchestra. Some musicians also get the chance to experience touring as part of a full orchestra with performances in schools and youth clubs across the UK.

== NYO Open ==
NYO Open events are outreach events run by NYO that are open to teenagers of a wide range of musical ability. This includes Side by Side activities, which are open rehearsals held at local venues that teenagers with instrument grades 3+ can join. During NYO Side by Side, The NYO musicians act as mentors and role models for the local musicians. Primary schools and secondary schools have also hosted NYO for open rehearsals and concerts. The National Youth Orchestra also provide a Free for Teens ticket offer at their concerts.

== Notable alumni ==
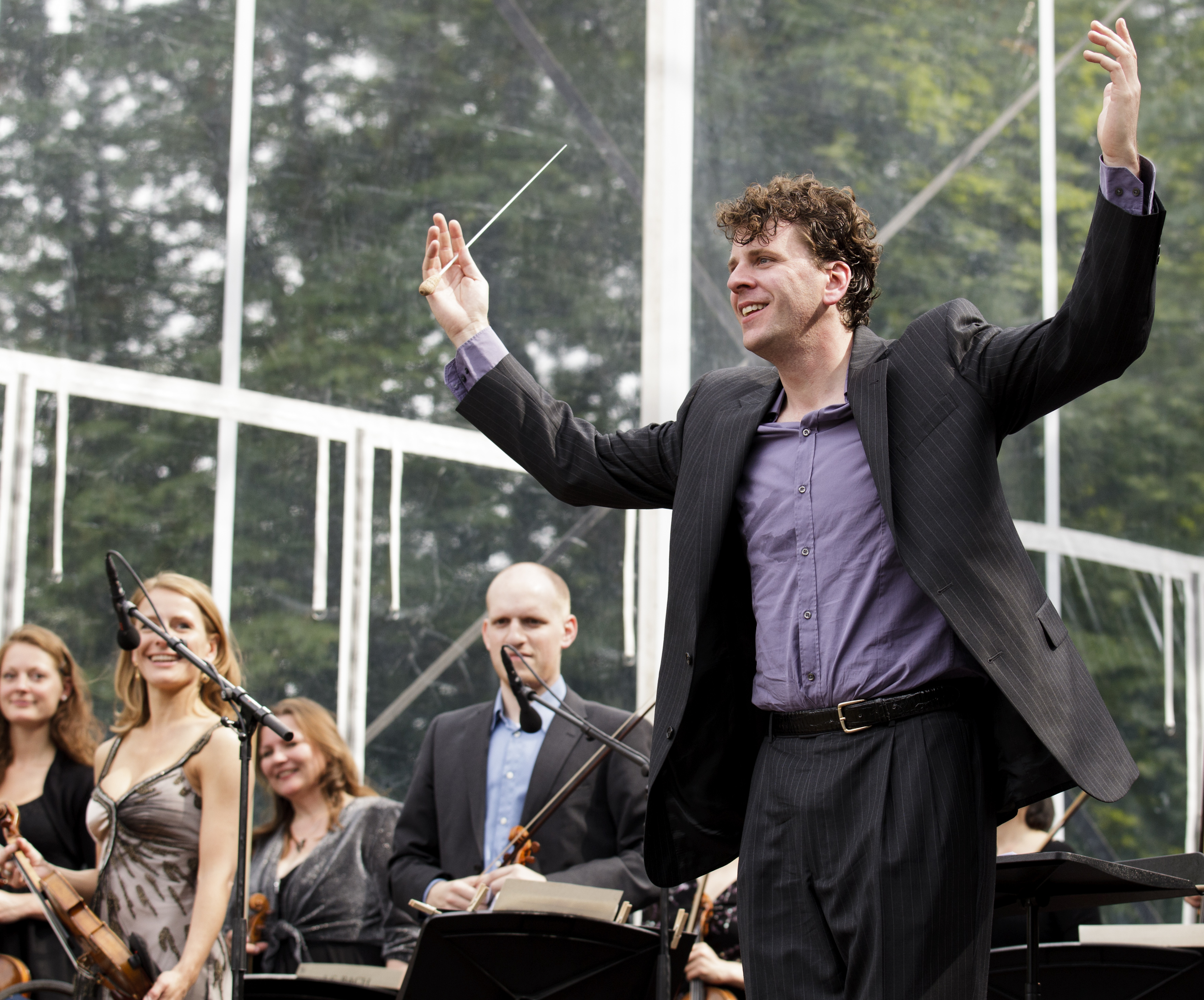
Dominic Seldis (1986–1989)

| Name | Instrument/profession | Instrument in NYO | NYO membership |
|---|---|---|---|
| David Campbell | Clarinetist | Clarinet | 1969–1970 |
| Simon Rattle | Conductor | Percussion | 1971 |
| Judith Weir | Composer | Oboe | 1971–1972 |
| Dominic Seldis | Double bassist | Double bass | 1986–1989 |
| Thomas Adès | Composer | Percussion | 1988 |
| Kwamé Ryan | Conductor | Double bass | 1988–1990 |
| Daniel Harding | Conductor | Trumpet | 1989–1992 |
| Katherine Bryan | Flautist | Flute | 1996–1999 |
| Guy Johnston | Cellist | Cello | 1997–1999 |
| Robin Ticciati | Conductor | Percussion | 1999–2002 |
| Adam Walker | Flautist | Flute | 2003 |
| Anna Lapwood | Organist | Harp | 2012–2013 |

== Selected honours ==
- In 2011, the orchestra was shortlisted for the Royal Philharmonic Society's Best Ensemble Award.
- In 2012, the NYO received the Queen's Medal for Music.
- In 2015, the NYO received the Royal Philharmonic Society's Ensemble award, which recognized particularly the launch of NYO Inspire as well as their other work.
- In 2020, NYO received UK Youth’s Inspiring Inclusivity Award, when the orchestra celebrated black voices in classical music through the #NYOmightyriver project during the Covid pandemic.

== See also ==
Other national level ensembles from different organizations:

- National Youth Wind Orchestra of Great Britain
- National Youth String Orchestra
- National Children's Orchestra of Great Britain
- National Youth Jazz Orchestra
- National Youth Wind Ensemble of Great Britain
- National Children's Wind Orchestra of Great Britain
- National Children's Wind Sinfonia of Great Britain
- National Youth Orchestras of Scotland
- National Youth Orchestra of Wales
- National Youth Choir

Other international national youth orchestras:

- List of youth orchestras
