= National Youth Wind Orchestra of Great Britain =

- Youth orchestra
- Short name: NYWO
- Founded: 1968
- Location: United Kingdom
- Music director: Louisa Denby
- Website: www.nywo.org.uk

The National Youth Wind Orchestra (NYWO) consists of around 75 young musicians aged 14 to 21 from England, Scotland, Wales, and Northern Ireland. Membership is by audition.

== History and heritage ==
The National Youth Wind Orchestra (NYWO) was originally named The British Youth Wind Orchestra when founded by clarinettist Eric McGavin in 1968. Stephen Dodgson (Chairman), Andrew McGavin, Robert Montgomery and Leonard Salzedo established it as a charity on 1 January 1986 and registered it with the Charity Commission on 28 February 1986.

It was renamed the National Youth Wind Orchestra of Great Britain (NYWO) in 1986. Thousands of young wind, brass, and percussion players have passed through the orchestra, many of whom are now found in professional music-making around the world. Kit Shepherd directed the organisation from 1990 until 2013. In 2024 the organisation was renamed 'National Youth Wind Orchestra' (NYWO). The current CEO and Artistic Director is Louisa Denby.

NYWO has conductor Simon Rattle as its patron.

== Performances ==
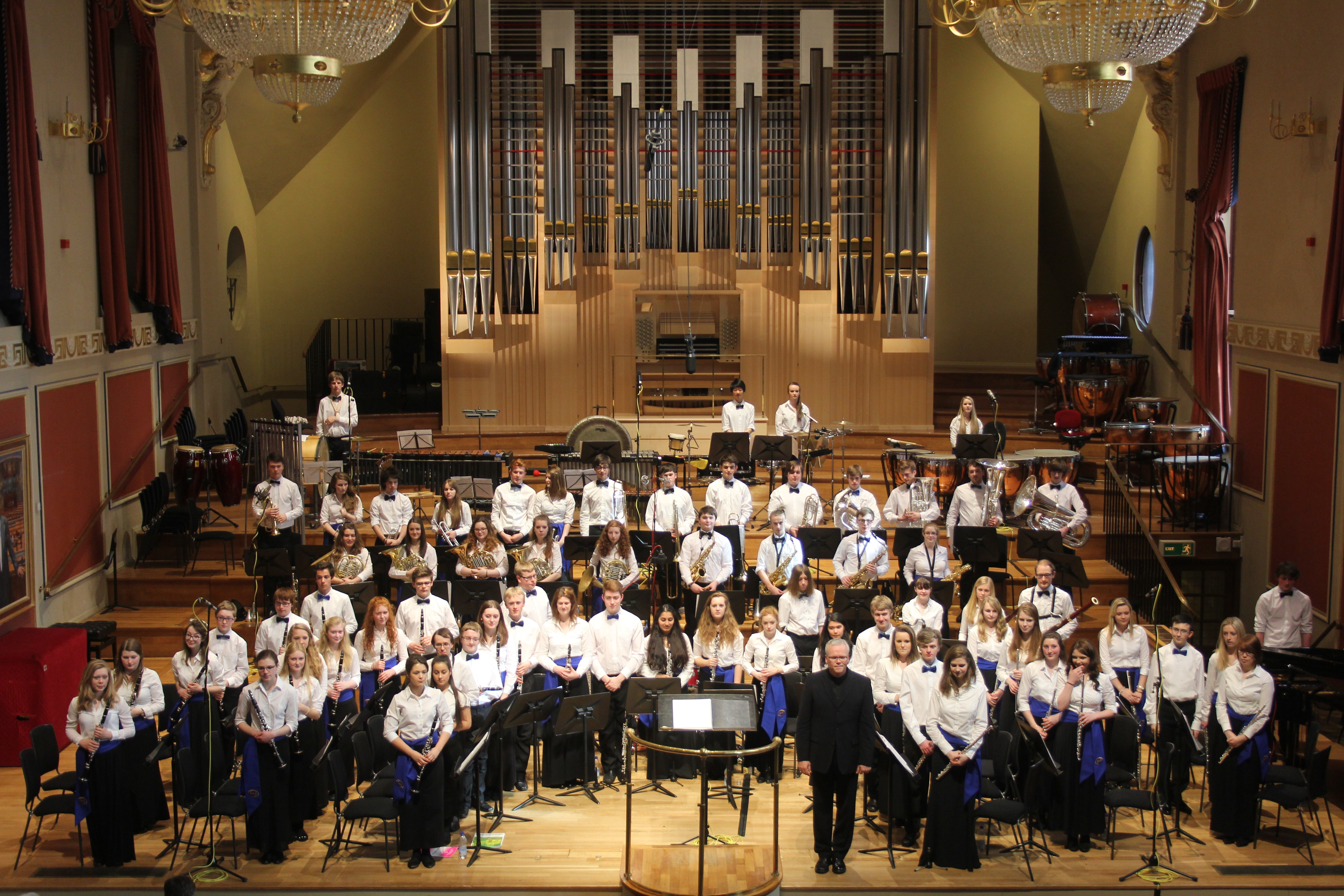
Duke's Hall Easter Concert 2014; conductor Tijmen Botma

The NYWO has performed at concert venues throughout the country and abroad including St John's, Smith Square, the Royal Albert Hall, Duke's Hall, Cadogan Hall, Birmingham Town Hall, Oxford Town Hall, the Zeughaus in Teufen, Ittingen Charterhouse (Switzerland) and the Rudolfinum in Prague (Czech Republic).

It performed at the Royal Albert Hall Promenade Concert 40 in the 2012 season and the BBC Proms Millennium Day in 2000 which was organised by Kit Shepherd in conjunction with the BBC. NYWO has also been recorded on BBC Radio 3 and Classic FM.

== Conductors ==
Conductors have included Dr Glenn D.Price (Canada), Dr Matthew George (America), Dr James Gourlay (Scotland), Colin Touchin (England) 1969–89, Harry Legge OBE (England), Peter Bassano (England), Tijmen Botma (Netherlands), Tourgny Hanson (Sweden), Dr Robert Childs (Wales).

== Composition ==
NYWO continues to commission new works whenever possible, inviting composers and soloists to work closely with members of the orchestra on new compositions. The orchestra were invited to perform Gavin Higgins's BBC Commission and world premiere, Der Aufstand, to much acclaim for the BBC Promenade Concert 40 in the 2012 season.

Commissions by the NYWO (pre 1986, the British Youth Wind Orchestra)
Year	Work	Composer
1972	Introduction & Rondo (clarinet choir)	Gordon Jacob
1974	Work for clarinet choir	Edwin Roxburgh
1974	Wind Symphony	Stephen Dodgson
1976	Concerto for Wind Orchestra	David Morgan
	Tonada Sefardita (clarinet choir)	Leonard Salzedo
1977	Symphony 8 The Four Elements	Wilfred Josephs
	Epigrams from a Garden (sop & Cl choir)	Stephen Dodgson
1979	Processiones	Leonard Salzedo
1980	Scenes from an imaginary Ballet	Graham Williams
1983	Sinfonietta	Derek Bourgeois
1984	Ultramarine	John Hopkins
1985	East Coast Sketches	Nigel Hess
1986	Quiet	Gordon Crosse
1987	1984	Dominic Muldowney
1988	Concert Dances	Howard Blake
1991	Theatre Fountain	Gary Carpenter
1992	Sinfonietta no 2	Philip Sparke
	Symphony Our Hopes like Towering Falcons	Colin Touchin
	Bandwagon	Stephen Dodgson
1994	Scenes from Breugel	Adam Gorb
2008	Gilded Theatre	Kenneth Hesketh

== Charitable trust ==
NYWO is a registered charity (no. 1205305). Current trustees are Mr Paul Harris, Mr Andrew Somerville, Ms Catherine Millar, and Mr John Hutchins.

This orchestra relies wholly on charitable donations, gifts and sponsorship.

== See also ==
- Children's National Youth Wind Orchestra
- National Youth Wind Ensemble of Great Britain
- National Youth Jazz Orchestra
- List of youth orchestras

== Sources ==
- NYWO Concert Programmes
- Repertoire by country on timreynish.com
- bedfordschool.org.uk
- YouTube
- sjss.org.uk
- biography on timreynish.com
- 4barsrest.com
