= Chimei (disambiguation) =

Chimei may refer to:

- Chimei Corporation - a Taiwan-based performance materials company; formerly Chi Mei Corporation
- Chimei Museum - a museum in Tainan, Taiwan
- Chimei Philharmonic Orchestra - a Taiwanese symphony orchestra
- Chimei（魑魅） - a supernatural being in Chinese folklore
- Red Eyebrows (Chinese: 赤眉; pinyin: Chìméi) - a peasant rebellion in the Xin dynasty
