= Anna Bourma =

Greek singer of Pontian origin

Anna Bourma (in Greek Άννα Μπουρμά) (born in Athens, Greece) is a Greek singer of Pontian origin. She studied at New Smyrna Conservatory, and has been working with various artists for more than a decade, including with Yorgos Dalaras, Νikos Zoudiari, Y. Zika, and M. Avdaki. She released her solo album Ta roda tis avlis (in Greek Τα Ρόδα Της Αυλής) in 2011.

== Discography ==
=== Albums ===
- 2011: Ta roda tis avlis (in Greek Τα Ρόδα Της Αυλής)
- 2014: " Ena tragoudi an swthei" (in Greek Ενα τραγούδι αν σωθεί)
