= George Dalaras =

Greek singer (born 1949)

George Dalaras Γιώργος Νταλάρας
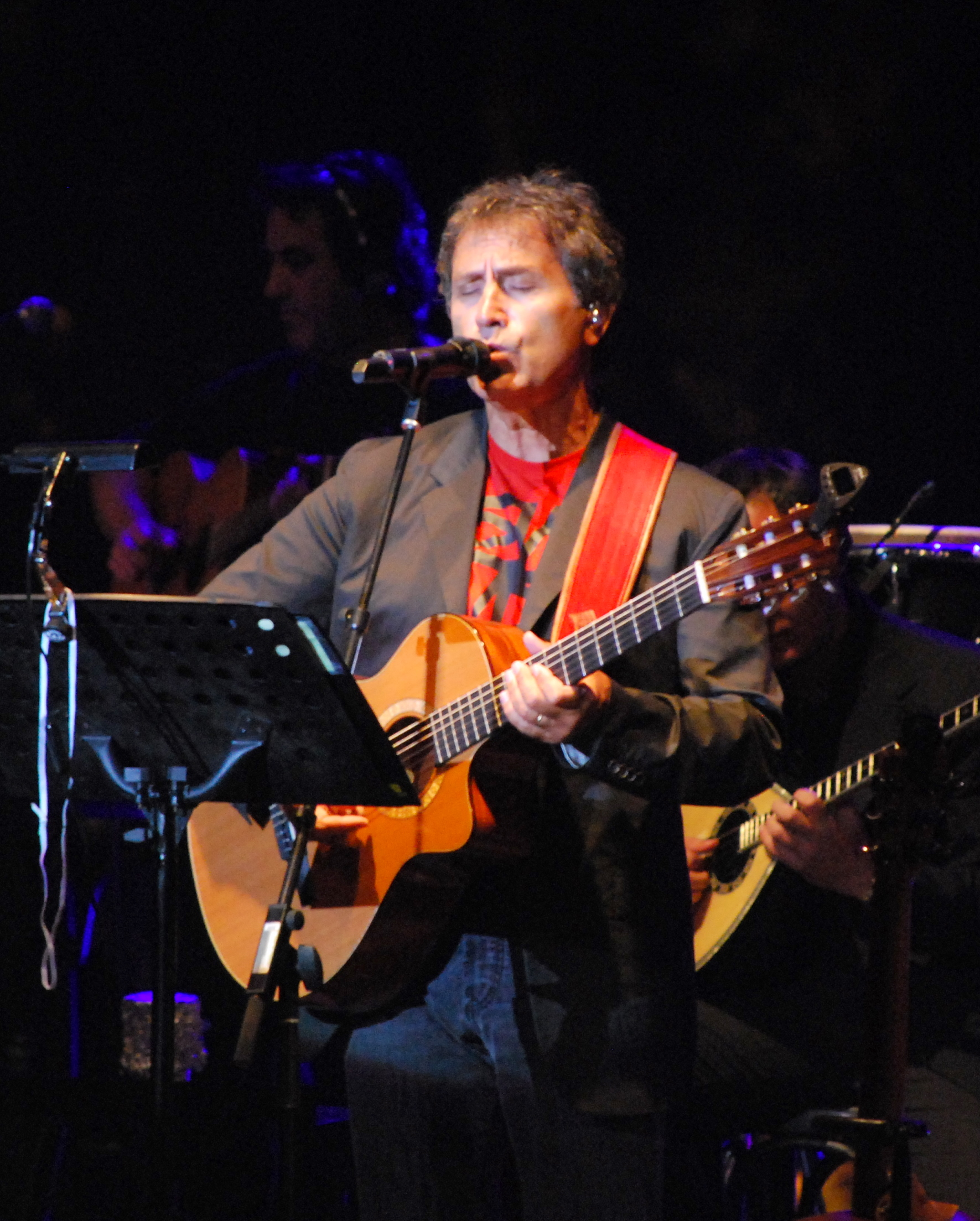
- George Dalaras in 2009

Background information
- Born: 29 September 1949 (age 77); Nikaia, Attica, Kingdom of Greece
- Origin: Greek
- Genres: pop music, éntekhno, laïko, traditional folk music, rebetiko, byzantine music, rock music, music of Latin America, western classical music, contemporary classical music, symphonic music, opera, etc
- Occupations: Singer, musician, composer, instrumentalist, music arranger, record producer, recording artist
- Instruments: Voice, guitar, string instrument, bouzouki, oud, baglamas, tzouras, harmonica, percussion instrument
- Years active: 1967–present
- Spouse: Anna Ragoussi (m. 1982)
- Website: http://www.georgedalaras.com

George Dalaras (Greek: Γιώργος Νταλάρας, born 29 September 1949) is a Greek singer and musician. He is one of the most prominent figures of Greek music. In October 2006, he was selected as a Goodwill Ambassador for the UN Refugee Agency.

He was born on 29 September 1949 at General Hospital of Nikaia Agios Panteleimon in Nikaia, Attica. His first memories of music were the basic forms of Greek music, such as traditional, folk, rebetiko, laïka, which influenced him as an artist. In addition, he has performed many other music genres in several different languages, such as pop, rock, latin, contemporary, byzantine music, classical, opera etc. He has collaborated with many Greek and foreign artists (composers, poets, maestros, musicians, etc.). In all, he has released almost 90 personal albums and has collaborated in more than 150 others as a singer, musician or producer. He is the Greek artist who has performed the biggest concerts of all time, both in Greece and abroad. He has performed at some of the most famous concert halls and stadiums all over the world, and has collaborated with many of the most renowned symphonic orchestras of the world.

He has received several honors and awards including a Cyprus citizenship, the "Kennedy" Award and the UNHCR Goodwill Ambassadorship.

== Concerts and sales ==
George Dalaras has released almost 90 personal albums (which in total have sold more than 18,000,000 copies worldwide) and has collaborated in many other albums. His popularity and performances around the world have led to him being considered a prominent representative of music from Greece.

In 1983, he performed two back to back sold-out concerts in the Olympic Stadium of Athens, attended by more than 160,000 people. It is the biggest music event ever held in Greece. "Greek music enters the era of the big stadiums" stated the Rolling Stone magazine. In 1987, he performed a third personal sold-out concert at the Olympic Stadium of Athens.

Since the late 1970s, he has performed in over 800 concerts outside Greece, promoting Greek culture abroad. He has performed at many concerts venues across the world, such as Radio City Music Hall, Royal Albert Hall, Metropolitan Opera, Olympia, Roy Thompson Hall, Meadowlands Arena, Kooyong Stadium, Rod Laver Arena, Sydney Opera House, Hammerstein Ballroom, Madison Square Garden, Wembley Arena, Rosemont Theatre, Trump Taj Mahal, Heichal HaTarbut, The Wang Theatre, Apollo Theater, Place des Arts, Wiener Konzerthaus, Palais des Congrès, etc.

He has also appeared at numerous cultural festivals, including Cuba (1981,1998), the Europalia Festival in Brussels (1982), the Peace Festival in Vienna (1983), the Youth Festival in Moscow (1985), the Aid to Africa Concert in the Peace and Friendship Stadium in Piraeus (1986), the Amnesty International Concert in Athens with Peter Gabriel, Sting, Bruce Springsteen, Tracy Chapman and Youssou'n'Dour (1988), the Poznan Jazz Festival in Poland (1999), the Crossing Border Festival in Amsterdam (2001), the Saratoga Festival in USA, with the famous Philadelphia Orchestra conducted by Charles Dutoit (2001), etc.

In 1992, he performed a sold-out concert at the Wembley Arena in London. It is the biggest Greek concert ever held in United Kingdom. It was a personal initiative of George Dalaras, to support Cyprus and to promote the Cyprus problem. Among others, Vanessa Redgrave and Georges Moustaki had taken part in the concert.

In 1994, he performed at the Meadowlands Arena in New Jersey before an audience of 22,000. It is the biggest Greek concert ever held outside of Greece. This concert was also dedicated to Cyprus. After this concert, he was invited to Washington D.C., where he received the "Kennedy" Award from Senator Edward Kennedy, in recognition of his humanitarian contributions.

== Collaborations and styles ==
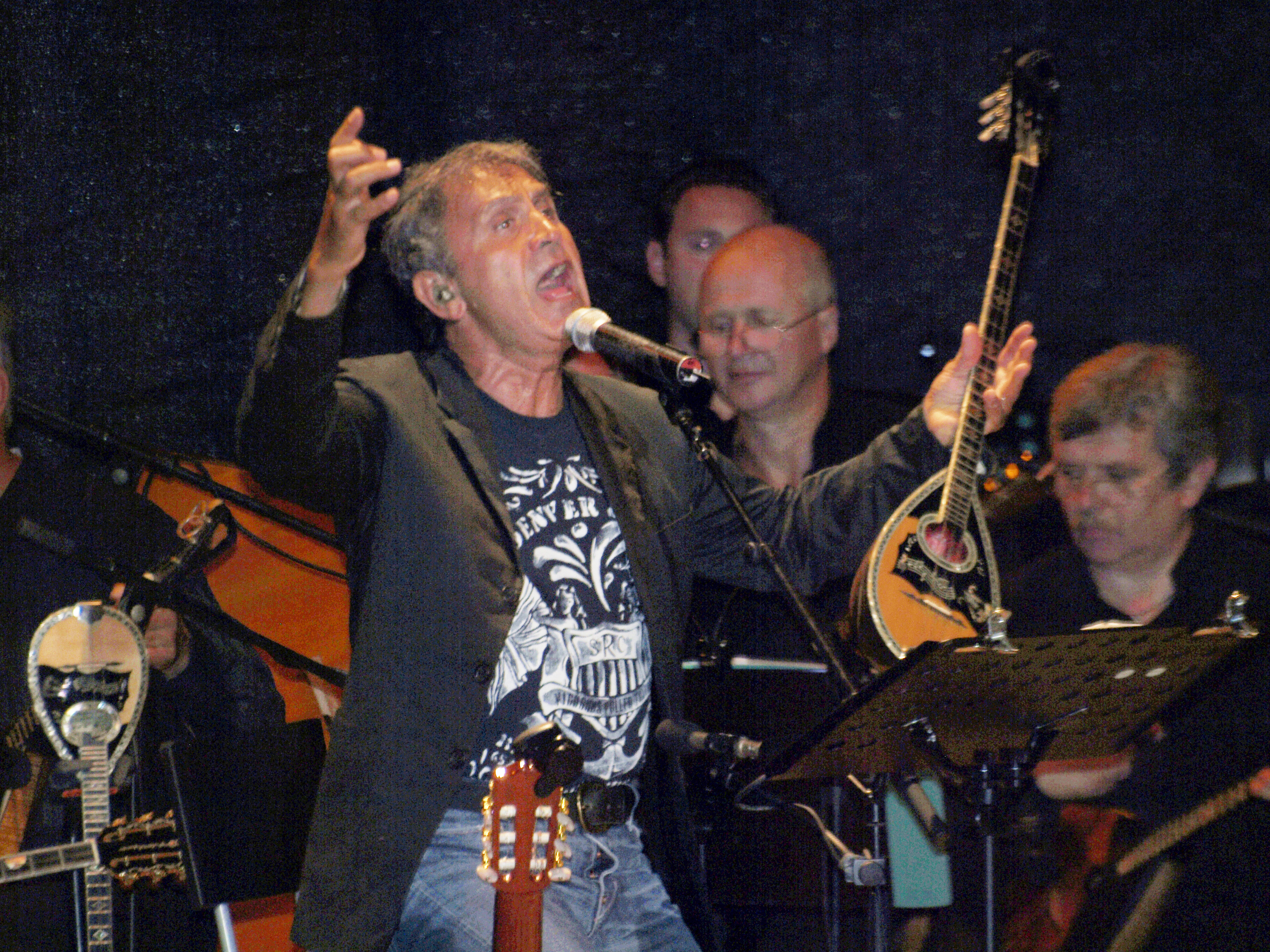
George Dalaras in Caesarea's Roman theatre in 2011

Since the 1960s, George Dalaras has sung numerous different Greek music styles (e.g. rebetiko, laïkó, Latin, pop), Arabic music, and religious music. He has collaborated with many contemporary Greek composers, including Mikis Theodorakis, Stavros Kouyioumtzis, Manos Loizos, Apostolos Kaldaras, Stavros Xarhakos, Manos Hadjidakis and Christos Nikolopoulos. He also discovered and supported young Areti Ketime, producing her first album. Apart from his prominent singing career, Dalaras is considered to be one a talented musician as he plays most of the stringed instruments of a Greek folk band with great success, including the guitar, bouzouki, baglamas, tzouras and outi. He has accompanied Al Di Meola and Paco de Lucía, among others. Dalaras' most important projects include collaborations with several international singers, including British singer Sting, releasing together a duet of Sting's song Mad About You. He has also collaborated with Termites, Pyx Lax, Bruce Springsteen, Jethro Tull, Yehuda Poliker, Emma Shapplin, Goran Bregovic, Apostolis Anthimos, Dulce Pontes, Andriana Babali and many others. Dalaras moved from his homestay label of Minos EMI in favour of Universal Music Greece in 2006, thus ending an almost 40-year collaboration.

In 2000, Dalaras discovered a new local orchestra that specialized at traditional Smirneiko (from Smyrna) and Rebetiko songs. The orchestra's name was "Εστουδιαντίνα Νέας Ιωνίας" (Estoudiantina Neas Ionias and it came from Nea Ionia, a city near Volos. Dalaras pulled Estoudiantina in the light of publicity and make it known to the Greek public. Since then Estoudiantina has become one of the most important and famous orchestras in Greece. Estoudiantina's repertoire now also includes Modern Greek, Greek Laiko, and Mediterranean.

== Early career ==
Dalaras' first song, "Προσμονή" (Prosmoni, "expectation"), was recorded in 1967. The single never reached any popular status, in fact it was barely released. Dalaras had to struggle to get into the studio, as the day he began his studio career was the day that the Greek military junta took over the streets of Athens, and the roads were littered with tanks. After several appearances on various recordings as a guest singer, his debut album was released in early 1969, a self-titled album released on the Minos label. The recording included many compositions by Stavros Kouyioumtzis, who in the early years proved a fountain of help towards Dalaras achieving musical success. As Dalaras has said in various interviews, he owes the fact that he became a singer to Kouyioumtzis, who composed Dalaras' first songs. His relation with Kouyioumtzis remained friendly until the sudden death of the composer due to a heart attack in March 2005.

The biggest hit of the record, "Που 'ναι τα χρόνια" (Pou 'ne ta chronia, "Where are the years?"), is still sung today, and is regarded as a mainstay in Dalaras' large repertoire. In 1970, he released the album "Να 'τανε το 21 " (Na 'tane to ikosi-ena, "If only it were '21", that is, 1821, a reference to the Greek War of Independence). The album was immediately more successful than his debut LP and included hits such as "Na 'tane to 21'", "Κάπου νυχτώνει" ("Kapou nichtoni", Somewhere the night falls), and an instrumental version of "Pou 'ne ta chronia". The album was made up entirely of compositions by Stavros Kouyioumtzis. The songs were mainly reinterpretations, as was common in the late 60s for new Greek singers; however, not all the songs on their first release (most of them on the smaller yet more distinctive LYRA label) had proved successful, and in many instances, even now, many people in Greece believe that the Dalaras songs are originals and not cover versions.

=== First gold album ===
In 1972, Dalaras along with singer Haris Alexiou, received his big break in the Greek music industry when their LP "Μικρά Ασία" (Mikra Asia, Asia Minor) went gold, his first album to do so. The songs were written by Apostolos Kaldaras, a heavyweight in the laïkó scene of the 50s and 60s, who at this time decided to enter the political fray of Greek music. Dalaras and Alexiou were immediately thrown into the limelight. The LP was also recently re-released in both CD and limited edition LP format by Minos-EMI. The Mikra Asia LP was followed up by "Βυζαντινός Εσπερινός" (Vizantinos Esperinos, Byzantine Vespers) in 1973. The album consisted again of Dalaras and Haris Alexiou, and was composed by Apostolos Kaldaras, however the lyrics were by the emerging Lefteris Papadopoulos, who had written Dalaras' first official recording. This was the last time that Dalaras officially worked with Apostolos Kaldaras in the studio, however, they worked together in live performances. Unlike Mikra Asia, Vizantinos Esperinos did not meet with exceptional sales, and is somewhat 'forgotten' in the repertoire of Dalaras's songs.

=== Rebetiko revival ===
After several LPs and further collaborations with Kouyioumtzis, Kaldaras, Manos Loïzos, Mikis Theodorakis and others, Dalaras decided to release his own renditions of rebetiko songs on the double LP "50 Χρόνια Ρεμπέτικο Τραγούδι" (Peninta Chronia Rebetiko Tragoudi, 50 Years of Rebetiko songs), released 1975. The recording proved an immediate success, despite the toning down of the lyrics. However, as a result, a new movement was set to take place in Greek music, and the once forgotten rebetes were finding themselves performing, in some cases for the first time in 30 to 40 years. He followed up this work with an LP in 1980, "Ρεμπέτικα της Κατοχής" (Rebetika tis Katohis, Rebetiko (songs) of the occupation), which was a more gritty and meaty release, more faithful to the tone of the original rebetika as heard in the 1930s. However, again references to drugs were cut out, and only mentioned in passing. Unlike the previous double LP, this one contained some of the original musicians, Bayianteras and Genitsaris in particular making an appearance on the album.

=== International Orthodox Youth Conference controversy ===
Dalaras had been scheduled to perform a concert on the closing night of the second International Orthodox Youth Conference held in Istanbul from 11 to 15 July 2007. The event, organised by the Ecumenical Patriarchate of Constantinople, had drawn the ire of the Turkish press and Turkish nationalist politicians who filed complaints to the Governorship of Istanbul to revoke the licence for the concert it had issued, and the concert was abruptly cancelled by the Turkish authorities of the Governorship of Istanbul on the grounds that the country's Archaeological Service did not permit the use of the planned venue, the 15th century Rumeli Hisar castle. The site had previously been used for international theatre festivals and for an international dance festival, until its use was prohibited by the Archaeological Service. The last-minute cancellation of the concert attracted strong media coverage and criticism in neighbouring Greece.

== Personal life ==
Dalaras was born George Daralas, son of the rembetiko singer Loukas Daralas. He subsequently anagrammatized his name to Dalaras. Since 1982, Dalaras is married to Anna Ragousi, also his manager and former politician who served with the PASOK government in 2009 and 2011. They have one daughter, Georgianna. Dalaras is a collector of musical instruments and in his spare time he goes fishing and traveling on his motorcycle, being a big motorsports fan.

== Orchestral collaborations ==
Dalaras is known for emphasizing the distinct character and global appeal of Greek music. His career has often bridged traditional Greek sounds with international musical styles, leading to collaborations with orchestras and artists worldwide.

- The famous Dutch Metropole Orchestra is the first big orchestra with which George Dalaras collaborated. It was an artistic gathering which took place in 1995 in the Odeon of Herodes Atticus under the direction of Dick Baker. The performances were recorded live and consequently released by EMI CLASSICS in fifteen countries, in an album titled "GEORGE DALARAS & METROPOLE ORCHESTRA".
- The artist's next collaboration with one of the most prominent and long-existent choirs in Europe took part when, in 1996, he interpreted Ariel Ramirez Misa Criolla Mass accompanied by the choir of the Deutsche Oper Berlin in the Berlin Opera. It was culturally significant due to its prominence in Greek media. The concert was transmitted live by SFB, a radio station with a predominantly classical repertoire.
- The next event was to be with the Israel Philharmonic Orchestra. In 1997, the Orchestra invited George Dalaras to stage two concerts in the Tel Aviv Mann Auditorium. It was a collaboration which materialized George Dalaras’ long desire to interpret Greek songs with the accompaniment of a symphony orchestra. The live recordings of these performances were internationally released in April 1999 by EMI CLASSICS in a digital disc titled: "GEORGE DALARAS AND THE ISRAEL PHILHARMONIC ORCHESTRA".
- In parallel George Dalaras collaborated with the Armonia Ateneaa, on the stage of the Athens Concert Hall in both the "...and by light and by death incessantly" by Costa Gavra (1994, 1995) and the "Angel Hymns in Human Rhythms" (1997) by Stavros Kougioumtzis, conducted by Alexandros Myrat.
- In 1999, George Dalaras collaborated with the Osipov State Russian Folk Orchestra. It was a high standard collaboration which made an impression by means of its simplicity. Thousands of spectators attended George Dalaras’ interpretation of songs by Greek composers as well as of ballads from the Mediterranean. These versions were performed by the Ossipov Orchestra. It merges the symphonic structure with the pop and folk elements. The 70-membered orchestra (which consisted of players of balalaikas and domras) was conducted by Nikolai Kalinin. The performances were staged in the Athens Concert Hall in Salonica, in the Patras Ancient Conservatory in Cyprus, in London's Queen Elizabeth Hall and finally, in Moscow in November 2000.
- In October 1999, George Dalaras met with the Montreal Symphony Orchestra in the Notre-Dame Basilica of Montreal.
- In September 2000, George Dalaras collaborated with the BBC Concert Orchestra. They met at the packed theatre Odeon of Herodes Atticus in a recital of orchestrations for a grand orchestra under the direction of Nick Davies and the participation of Joan Faulkner, the American jazz singer. The concert, the tickets of which had been sold out days before, was repeated in October of the same year in London's Royal Festival Hall with the participation of the big School.
- In October 2000, four concerts that were staged in Cyprus signaled George Dalaras’ collaboration with the Kremlin Moscow State Symphony Orchestra. This was an event in which Margarita Zorbala had also taken part. Pavel Ovsianikov is the artistic director and conductor of the orchestra; he is a composer who, in the course of his creative career, has managed to combine the preservation of Russian cultural heritage with the quest for new musical ideas. In November 2000 they met again in Russia in a concert that was staged in Grand Kremlin Palace’s George Hall.
- In June 2001, George Dalaras collaborated again with the Osipov State Russian Folk Orchestra conducted by Nikolai Kalinin. The event took place in Delphi and it was a unique concert that was part of the list of events scheduled for the celebration of the First World Refugee Day as well as for the completion of 50 years upon the founding of the United Nations High Commissioner for Refugees.
- In August 2001, George Dalaras –through his participation in the Saratoga Classical Music Festival- collaborated for the first time with the Philadelphia Orchestra conducted by Charles Dutoit. The above Festival is held each summer and is organized in Saratoga Springs, N.Y. It was the first time that a Greek artist participated in it.
- In September 2001, he collaborated with Armonia Atenea Orchestra, with ninety musicians in total and the Fons Musicalis choir, at the Odeon of Herodes Atticus. He was accompanied by Emma Shapplin.
- Toward the end of 2002 and the beginning of 2003, George Dalaras collaborated with the Cyprus Symphony Orchestra. Together, they staged three concerts in London, Copenhagen and Paris which aimed at promoting the cultural visage of Europe, upon the instance Cyprus’ imminent integration within the European Union.
- In August 2004, George Dalaras performed two concerts entitled "30th – 40th parallel – Musical Journey to the Mediterranean" at the Odeon of Herodes Atticus.
- In May 2005 George Dalaras and Dulce Pontes performed two unique concerts at the Herodes Atticus Odeon entitled "The Sea and Us". These concerts were organized by the Association of Friends of Children with Cancer "ELPIDA" for supporting their objectives, under the auspices of the Hellenic Festival.
- In November 2005, George Dalaras performed at the Athens Concert Hall two of the most significant works of Mikis Theodorakis "Romiosini" poetry by Yiannis Ritsos and "Axion Esti" poetry by Odysseas Elytis. George Dalaras was accompanied by the Popular Orchestra "Mikis Theodarakis" and a popular orchestra, the Greek Radio and TV Modern Music Orchestra. The proceeds of both concerts were offered to the Association of Rehabilitation for Addicted persons.
- In November 2010, George Dalaras had a unique concert in New York at Lincoln Center with CityMusic Cleveland conducted by Alexandros Myrat. The works of the Greek-Canadian composer Christos Hadzis "Credo" and "Telluric Dances" were presented for the first time in a world premiere.
- In June and September 2011, George Dalaras cooperated with the Osipov State Russian Folk Orchestra conducted by Vladimir Andropov, in very successful concerts in Cyprus and Israel. He was accompanied by Aspasia Stratigou.
- In July 2011, George Dalaras cooperated for the first time with the Istanbul State Symphony Orchestra conducted by Hakan Sensoy, in a unique sold out concert, accompanied by Aspasia Stratigou.
- On 26 November 2011, George Dalaras presented in a world premier the work "Kavafis" by the composer Alexandros Karozas at the Konzerthaus, Vienna with Vienna Chamber Orchestra and Wiener Singakademie.
- In September 2012, George Dalaras participated in "Balkan Symphony" in Sarajevo. In this concert prominent artists from Balkan countries and the Mediterranean participated together with the Sarajevo Philharmonic Orchestra, enriched with local instruments, conducted by Oguzhan Balci.
- In February 2013, George Dalaras presented the work "Kavafis" by the composer Alexandros Karozas, at Gasteig in Munich with Vienna Chamber Orchestra and Wiener Singakademie of the "Vienna Academy of Music" under the direction of Stefan Vladar. One of the leading German character actors, Lambert Hamel recited the poems of Konstantine Kavafis.
- In May 2014, he collaborated again with the Israel Philharmonic Orchestra, at the Mann Auditorium in Tel Aviv, conducted by Loukas Karytinos. He was accompanied by Maria Faradouri.
- In June 2014, he collaborated with the Bursa State Symphony Orchestra and the State Polyphonic Choir, in Bursa of Turkey, with the participation of Okan Bayülgen.
- In October 2017, he collaborated with the İzmir State Symphony Orchestra, in Izmir, conducted by Hakan Şensoy.
- In June 2019, he collaborated again with the İzmir State Symphony Orchestra, conducted by Hakan Şensoy. The two concerts were held at the Odeon of Herodes Atticus.
