= Adana Metropolitan Theatre =

Theatre hall in Adana, Turkey

Coordinates: 36°59′35″N 35°19′33″E

Adana Büyükşehir Belediyesi Tiyatro Salonu
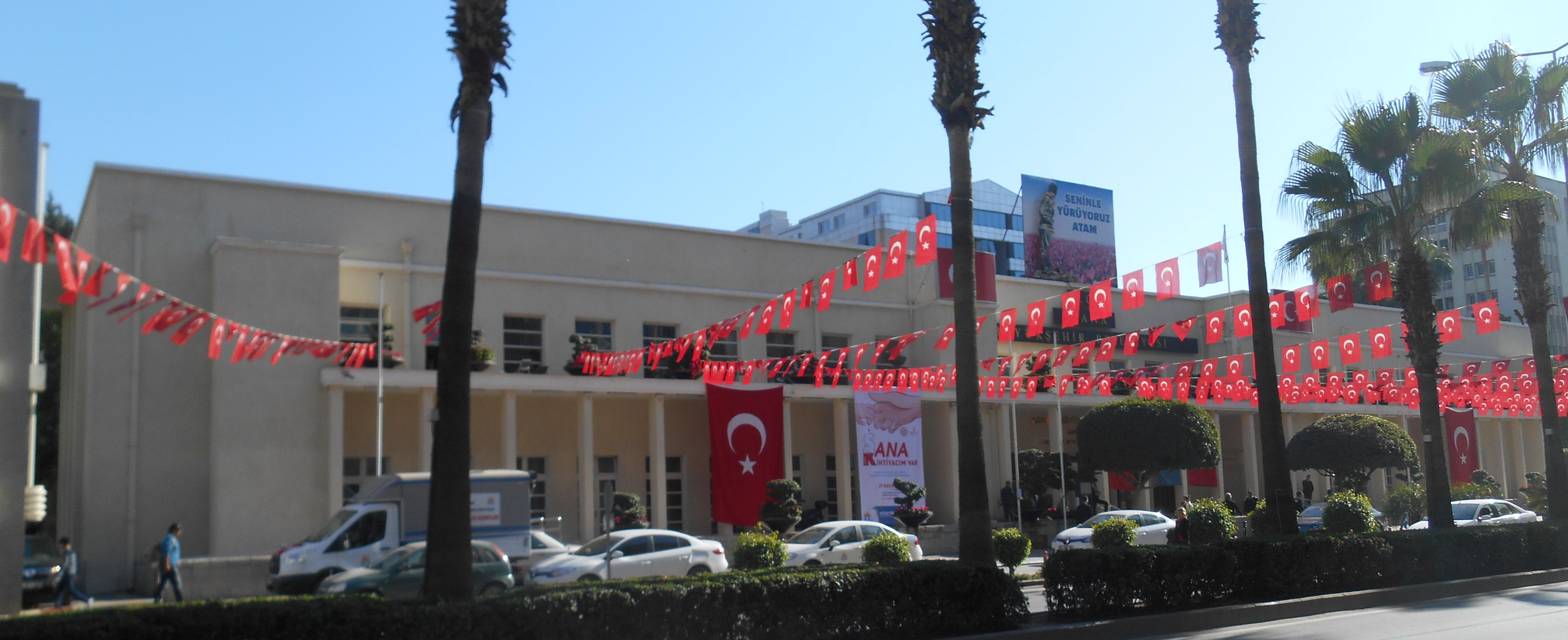
- Interactive map of Adana Büyükşehir Belediyesi Tiyatro Salonu
- Address: Atatürk Caddesi, Reşatbey, Seyhan; Adana; Turkey
- Owner: Adana Metropolitan Municipality
- Capacity: 525
- Type: Theatre
- Current use: Theatre, Concert
- Production: Çukurova State Symphony Orchestra; Adana Town Theatre

Construction
- Opened: 1938

Adana Metropolitan Theatre (Turkish: Büyükşehir Tiyatro Salonu) is a theatre hall in the Reşatbey neighborhood of the city of Adana. It is the oldest living theatre hall of the city, and currently the most active; hosting numerous theatre performances, concerts and conferences.

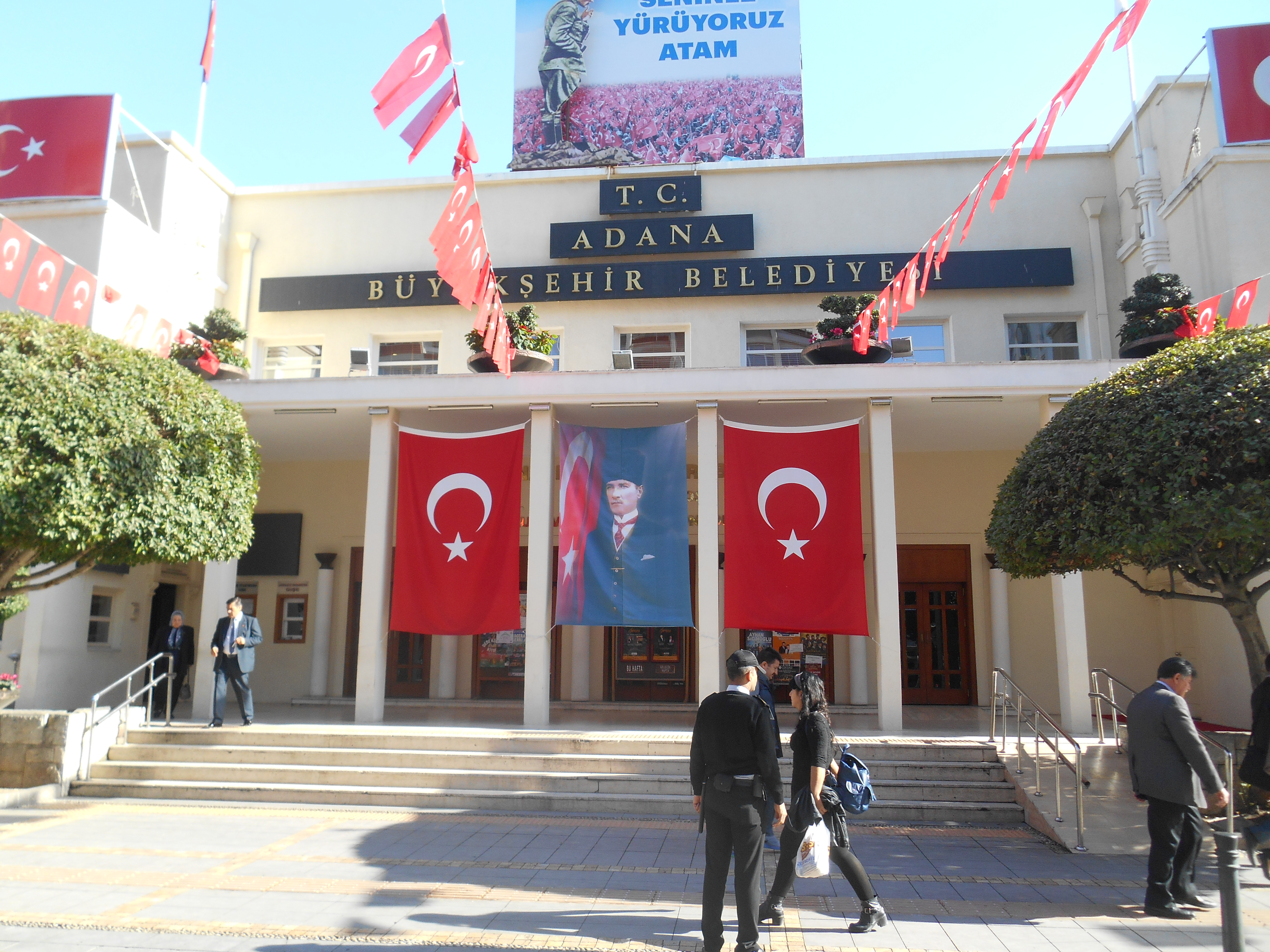
Main entrance

== History ==
The theatre was built in 1938, as a community centre ((Turkish: Halkevi)). It was converted into City Hall in 1951, after the law introduced by the national government that shut down all the community centres in Turkey. Adana Town Theatre was founded in 1958, performed its first play 'An American in Harput' on October 15, 1958. Çukurova State Symphony Orchestra conducted its first concert at the hall in 1992.

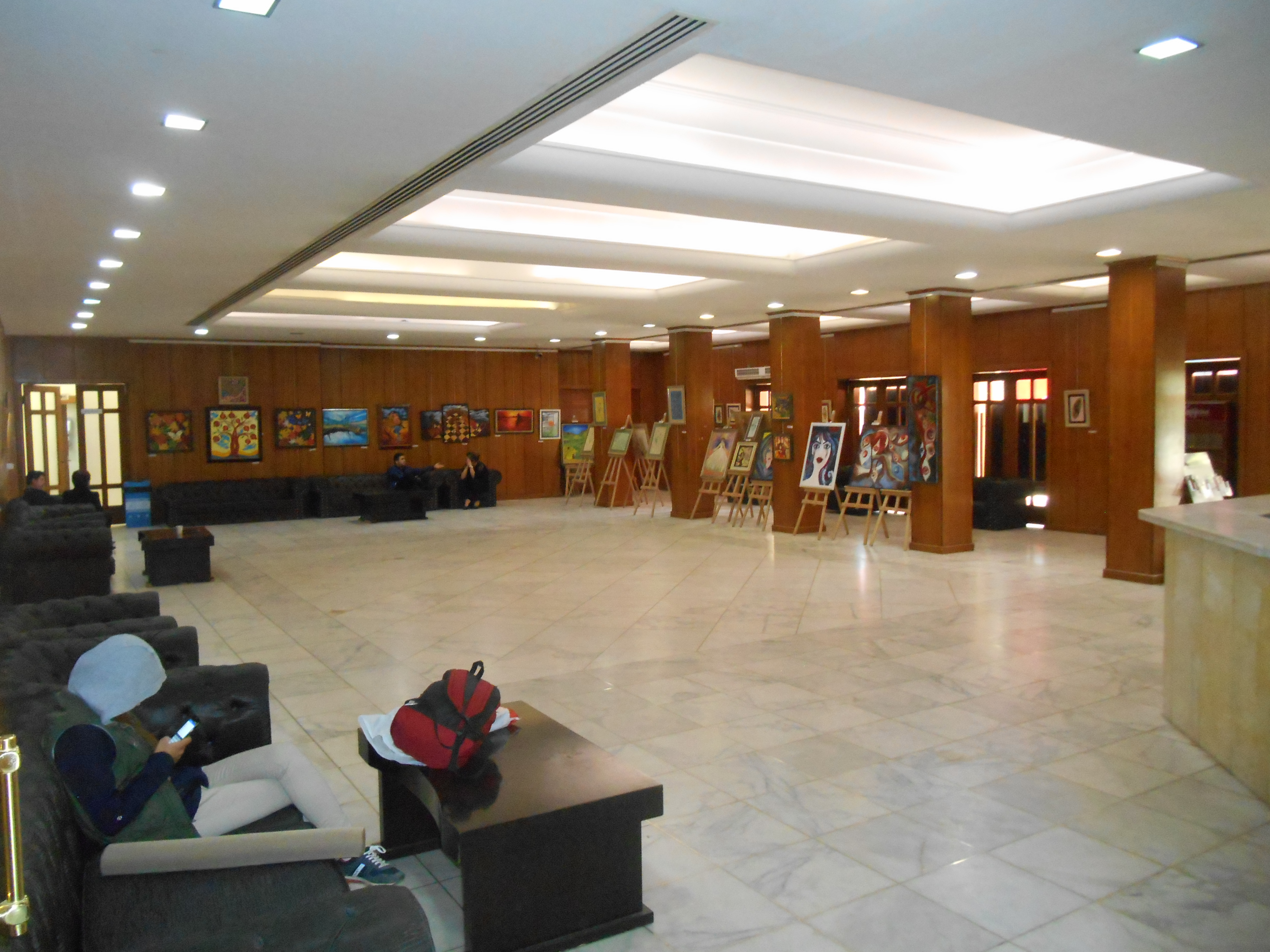
The lounge

== The Hall ==
525-seater theatre hall is the permanent home of the Çukurova State Symphony Orchestra and Adana Town Theatre. Symphony Orchestra conducts concerts every Friday, from October to May at the hall. Town theatre stage twice weekly. Several private theatres, concert groups also performs all year long at the theatre hall.

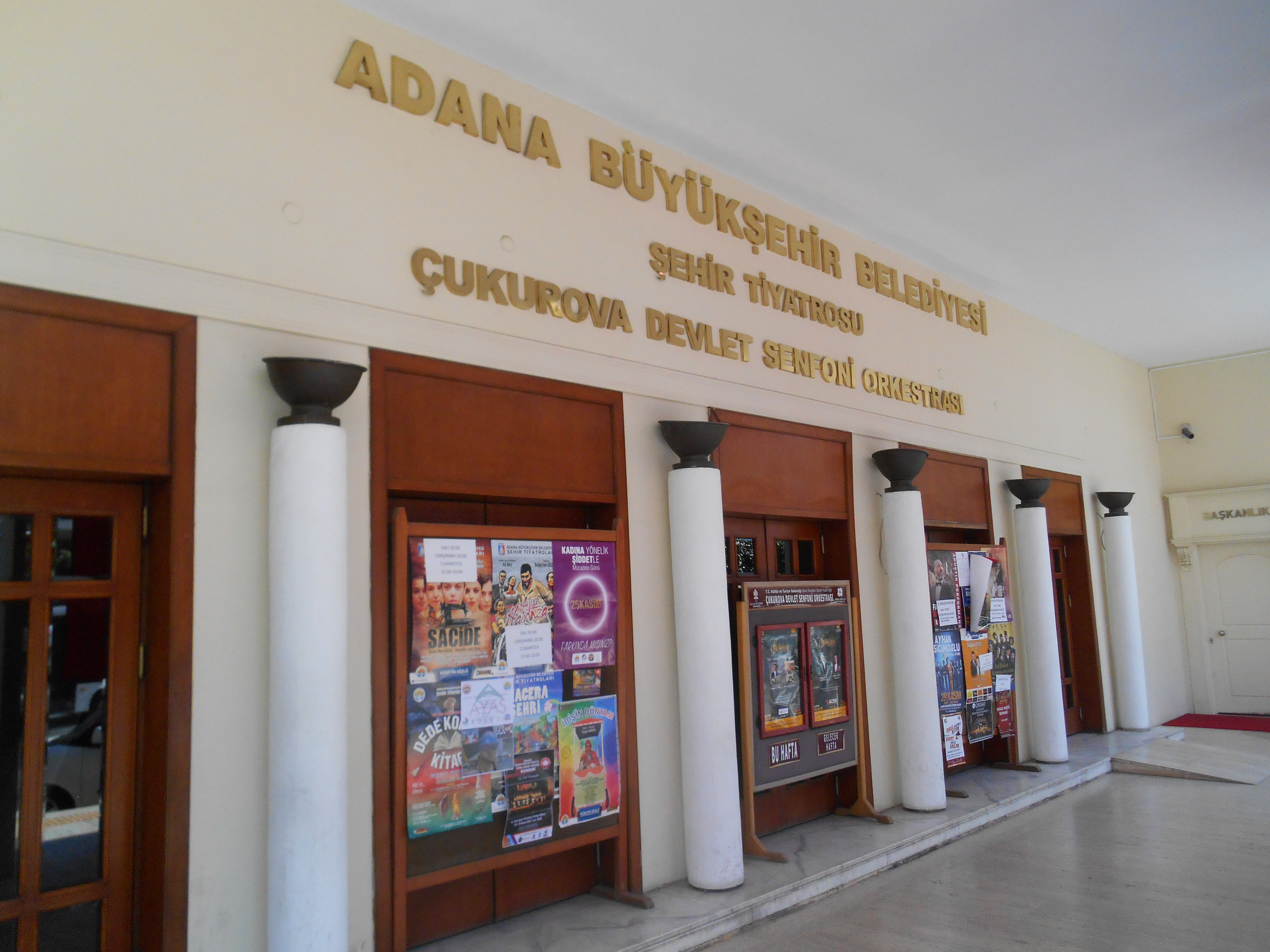
