= Damian Iorio =

British-Italian conductor (born 1972)

- Born: 1972 (age 52–53); London, UK
- Genres: Classical
- Occupations: Conductor, musician
- Instrument: Violin
- Labels: Sony Classics; Naxos
- Awards: Knight of the Order of Saint Agatha; 2006
- Website: damianiorio.com

Damian Iorio (born 1972) is a British-Italian conductor.

== Early life and education ==
Born in London, Iorio is the son of violinist Diana Cummings and viola player Luciano Iorio. Iorio's uncle is Douglas Cummings, the former principal cello of the London Symphony Orchestra. He began violin studies as a young child with Sheila Nelson. While an undergraduate violin student of Yossi Zivoni at the Royal Northern College of Music, Iorio began conducting studies and participated in conducting masterclasses with Ilya Musin.

He completed violin studies at Indiana University School of Music in the United States with Franco Gulli. Iorio went on to study conducting at Saint Petersburg Conservatory with Ilya Musin and Alexander Polishchuk. At the same time, he held a position in the first violin section of the Danish National Symphony Orchestra.

== Career ==
Iorio appeared on the international scene in 2006 following his debut with the London Philharmonic Orchestra. He went on to work with Glyndebourne Festival Opera, Paris Opera, Detroit Symphony Orchestra, San Francisco Symphony, Philharmonia, Netherlands Radio Philharmonic Orchestra, Royal Philharmonic Orchestra, Orchestre National de Belgique, and the BBC Symphony, Scottish, Welsh and Philharmonic orchestras. Iorio was music director of the Milton Keynes City Orchestra from 2014 until the orchestra's closure in 2019. He is also Music Director of the National Youth String Orchestra, having held this position since 2012.

In 2021 he founded the music publishing company Sfera Publishing.

== Selected recordings ==
- Dvořák - Concerto for Violin and Orchestra in A minor, op. 53 (Sony Classics)
- Pizzetti - Symphony in A Harp Concerto (Naxos)

== Awards ==
In 2006, Iorio received the Knight of the Order of Saint Agatha from the Republic of San Marino in recognition for his services to music.
