= Samuel Parry =

Samuel Parry may refer to:

- Sam Parry (born 1991), Welsh rugby union player
- Samuel Parry, founder of the Western Australian Charity Orchestra
