= Algiers International Philharmonic Orchestra =

Algerian international philharmonic orchestra

- Philharmonic orchestra
- Native name: الأوركسترا الفيلهارمونية الدولية للجزائر
- Founded: 2026
- Location: Algiers, Algeria
- Concert hall: Algiers Opera House
- Principal conductor: Amine Kouider

The Algiers International Philharmonic Orchestra (Arabic: الأوركسترا الفيلهارمونية الدولية للجزائر, Berber languages: Tuṛkist Tafilaṛmunit Tagraɣlant n Dzayer) is an Algerian philharmonic orchestra established in October 2026 by decision of President Abdelmadjid Tebboune. The orchestra is supervised by the Algerian Ministry of Culture and Arts and conducted by Amine Kouider.

== History ==
The project to establish the orchestra received the endorsement of President Tebboune during a Council of Ministers meeting on 23 February 2026. The president described it as a national artistic and cultural project intended to contribute to the development of Algeria's musical scene.

On 12 September 2026, the Ministry of Culture and Arts announced the opening of applications for auditions to recruit musicians for the orchestra. The auditions began on 28 September at the Algiers Opera House, under the supervision of Culture Minister Malika Bendouda and project director Amine Kouider. Lebanese musician Marcel Khalife participated in evaluating professional instrumentalists.

During the auditions, Kouider described the project as an effort to establish an international musical and cultural representation of Algeria. The proposed repertoire included Algerian music arranged for philharmonic and symphonic performance, alongside international musical works. The initial recruitment plan envisaged an ensemble of 100 musicians, comprising approximately 70 percent Algerian musicians and 30 percent international musicians from around 12 countries.

The orchestra was officially established by presidential decision on 30 October 2026. The announcement stated that it comprised 70 musicians and was directed by Kouider, under the supervision of the Ministry of Culture and Arts.

== Organisation and repertoire ==
The orchestra's stated objectives include presenting Algerian musical heritage through symphonic arrangements and performing international repertoire. The project also envisaged the creation of an academy to support young musicians and develop a youth orchestra as a training and recruitment pathway for the main ensemble.
