= National Ballet of China Symphony Orchestra =

The National Ballet of China Symphony Orchestra (Chinese: 中央芭蕾舞团交响乐团) is a national symphony orchestra of China.

The orchestra was founded in 1959 under the National Ballet of China. Zhang Yi is the music director and chief conductor and Liu Ju is the resident conductor.

French conductor Jean Perrison has visited the orchestra and offered technical exchanges during his stay in China. Ashley Lawrence, the chief conductor of National Symphony Orchestra of Peru; Peter Larsen, the chief conductor of Royal Danish Ballet and a group of soloists and singers from the American Music Education Delegation have held various concerts with the orchestra.

In recent years, the orchestra has been regularly invited to audio and video recording by various Central stations, China Central Television and other China's record companies, publishers and film studios. It has toured across China including Hong Kong and Macao, as well as overseas. The orchestra has performed many works in the ballet repertoire: Swan Lake, The Sleeping Beauty, The Nutcracker, Raise the Red Lantern, Pirates, Don Quixote, Coppélia, Leiquan, Ji Purcell and others.

== Useful links ==
- National Ballet of China Symphony Orchestra Webpage
- National Ballet of China Symphony Orchestra - Orchestra Members' List Webpage
- Nation Ballet of China Official Website
- List of Symphony Orchestras in Greater China -PRC. HKSAR. Macao SAR and Taiwan
