= City Chamber Orchestra of Hong Kong =

Hong Kong chamber orchestra

The City Chamber Orchestra of Hong Kong (CCOHK) was founded in Hong Kong in 1999 and is one of Asia’s leading chamber orchestras. Members are professional musicians experienced in playing a diverse range of styles from early music to tango, Bollywood and jazz.

== Background ==
CCOHK was founded in 1999 by oboist Leanne Nicholls, who is also the artistic director. It is known for having a very large repertoire spanning many different styles. French conductor Jean Thorel served as chief conductor from 2008 to 2016. Previous and current guest conductors include Anthony Inglis, Philip Walsh, Nicholas Routley, Peter Leech, Richard Honner, Richard Harvey, Lorenzo Colitto (guest concertmaster), Vahan Mardirossian, Colin Touchin, Nicholas Cleobury and Jonathan Berman. City Chamber Orchestra of Hong Kong is in high demand with performing engagements for Hong Kong Ballet, Le French May Arts Festival, RTHK Radio 4, the World Harp Congress, the Hong Kong Contemporary Music Festival and the Hong Kong International Piano Competition. Since 1999 the orchestra has performed with many world-class artists including Sir James Galway, Dame Evelyn Glennie, Dame Emma Kirkby, Sir Thomas Allen, Christian Lindberg, Sarah Chang, Mario Brunello, Julian Lloyd Webber, Edgar Meyer, Branford Marsalis, Richard Galliano, Sir Neville Marriner, The King’s Singers, The Swingles and Kirill Troussov. In addition to hosting masterclasses, workshops and soirées for kids, CCOHK has conceived, scripted and produced its own highly successful orchestral-theatre programmes aimed at engaging and educating children in Hong Kong. These include Magnificent Mozart, The Star Bach and Bug Symphony which won the Public Choice Award at the YAMawards in Portugal 2017.

== Tour ==
CCOHK has performed in Taipei, Italy and China at historical locations such as the Forbidden City Concert Hall in Beijing and the San Filippo Teatro in L'Áquila (since devastated by earthquake). In 2018, CCOHK was invited to perform at the 20th China Shanghai International Arts Festival.

== Recordings ==
Recordings include a CD featuring the world premiere of Richard Harvey's Concerto Incantanto with Danish recorder virtuoso Michala Petri on OUR Recordings.

== See also ==
- Hong Kong Philharmonic Orchestra
- Hong Kong Sinfonietta
- Hong Kong Chamber Orchestra
- Pan Asia Symphony Orchestra
