= Alpesh Chauhan =

British conductor (born 1990)

Alpesh Chauhan OBE (born 26 April 1990) is a British conductor and music director of Birmingham Opera Company. He is also principal guest conductor of the Düsseldorf Symphony Orchestra, as well as being the recently appointed Principal Conductor & Music Advisor of The National Youth Orchestra.

Chauhan was born in Birmingham and studied cello, before then pursuing his conducting studies at the Royal Northern College of Music. He was assistant conductor at the City of Birmingham Symphony Orchestra from 2013 to 2016 where he was assistant to and mentored by music director Andris Nelsons and principal guest conductor Edward Gardner.

== Titles ==
- Principal Conductor & Music Advisor, The National Youth Orchestra [2025- ]
- Principal guest conductor, Düsseldorf Symphony Orchestra [2021– ]
- Music director, Birmingham Opera Company [2020– ]
- Associate conductor, BBC Scottish Symphony Orchestra [2020–2023]
- Principal conductor, Filarmonica Toscanini [2017–2020]
- Assistant conductor, City of Birmingham Symphony Orchestra [2014–2016]
- Conducting fellow, City of Birmingham Symphony Orchestra [2013–2014]

== Discography ==
- Tchaikovsky Orchestral Works, Vol. 1 – Chandos Records (2023); Vol. 2 (2024); Vol. 3 (2025): TBA – currently in production

== Honours ==
- Officer of the Most Excellent Order of the British Empire, Elizabeth II's 2022 New Year Honours
- Newcomer of the Year, International Opera Awards 2021
