= Philip Grange =

English composer and academic

Philip Grange (born 17 November 1956) is an English composer and academic.

== Career ==
Grange was born in London. He attended Peter Maxwell Davies’s classes at Dartington, and then took further, private, lessons with Davies while at The University of York, where he also studied composition with David Blake.

He was Fellow Commoner in Creative Arts at Trinity College, Cambridge (1985–7), and Northern Arts Fellow in Composition at Durham University (1988–9) before joining the music department at Exeter University as lecturer (1989), reader (1995) and professor (1999) in composition. In 2000 he moved to the University of Manchester, where he is Professor of Music.

== Works ==
Grange's first published pieces date from the late 1970s, and include Cimmerian Nocturne (1979), which was commissioned by The Fires of London, and included a performance under director Peter Maxwell Davies at the 1983 Proms as well as performances in Britain and abroad. Other early works include The Kingdom of Bones for mezzo-soprano and chamber orchestra, (1983), Variations (1988) and Concerto for Orchestra: Labyrinthine Images (1988)

During the early 1990s Grange completed two BBC commissions, Focus and Fade for the BBC Symphony Orchestra, which performed the premiere at the Royal Festival Hall in 1992 conducted by Andrew Davis, and Lowry Dreamscape, which was premiered at the 1993 BBC Festival of Brass by the Sun Life Brass Band conducted by Roy Newsome. Other works from this period include Piano Polyptich (premiered by Stephen Pruslin on 26 June 1993 at the Aldeburgh Festival) and Bacchus Bagatelles for wind quintet.

Grange has written works for the National Youth Wind Ensemble of Great Britain, Ensemble Gemini and the Psappha New Music Ensemble. On 12 July 2009, the National Youth Wind Ensemble performed the world premiere of Cloud Atlas, a large-scale work based on the 2004 novel by David Mitchell, at the Cheltenham Music Festival, conducted by Philip Scott. Ensemble Gemini's CD Homage, including the works Tiers of Time (piano, violin, viola and cello, 2007), Elegy (cello solo, 2009), Piano Trio: Homage to Chagall (1995), and Shifting Thresholds (flute, clarinet, piano, percussion, violin, cello, 2016), was issued by Metier in 2019. The Psappha Ensemble first performed Cimmerian Nocturne at the 1980 St Magnus Festival in Orkney.

Grange's music is published by Maecenas and Edition Peters.
