= Evergreen Symphony Orchestra =

- Orchestra
- Native name: 長榮交響樂團
- Short name: ESO
- Former name: Evergreen Orchestra
- Founded: 2001
- Location: Taipei, Taiwan
- Principal conductor: Gernot Schmalfuss
- Website: www.evergreensymphony.org

Performance of Haydn's Symphony No. 104 in D major, Hob.I:104 at the National Concert Hall in Taipei (10 March 2022)

The Evergreen Symphony Orchestra (ESO; Chinese: 長榮交響樂團; pinyin: Chángróng Jiāoxiǎng Yuètuán) is a Taiwanese orchestra founded by the Chang Yung-Fa Foundation of Evergreen Group in 2001. The orchestra is featured by bringing up talented Taiwanese players and promoting Taiwanese folk music. Two of the many performances of ESO is on EVA Air's boarding, approach, and disembarkation background music, accompanying the shots of Taiwan on the PTV's and overhead screens during boarding. On final approach, the music is accompanied by "no cellulars", "no smoking", live plane map, and current plane information and departure and destination information, including estimated time of arrival on the screens. During disembarkation, the music is accompanied by "We Look Forward To Serve You Again" message, no smoking, no cellulars, and real-time information display on screens.

== History ==
In April 2001, the Chang Yung-Fa Foundation invited a number of Chinese musicians and well-known international arts consultants to help form a 20-person Evergreen Orchestra, which was soon expanded to a 70-person symphony orchestra in 2002. Lim Kek-tjiang, a renowned Chinese-Indonesian violinist and conductor, was invited to be the first music director and chief conductor. In July 2004, 36-year-old Wang Ya-hui, the then music director of Akron Symphony Orchestra and a former recipient of an Evergreen Music Scholarship, took over at the position and became the first woman to head a symphony orchestra in Taiwan.

ESO has held regular concerts since October 2002 and performs local Taiwanese folk songs and ballads in the form of symphonic music in addition to famous classical works at each concert. Since September 2004, they began tours abroad, include public performances at the Esplanade Concert Hall in Singapore, Beethoven Music Festival in Tokyo, Japan, and a successful tour to Beijing and Shanghai, China.

In addition to performing, ESO also aims for education. In March 2005, they organized an international musical education event and invited the internationally renowned violinist Zakhar Bron to Taiwan to share and teach his skills to local students.

== Music directors ==
- Lim Kek-tjiang (林克昌), 2002–2004
- Wang Ya-hui (王雅蕙), 2004–2006
- Gernot Schmalfuss, 2007–present

== See also ==
- Chimei Symphony Orchestra
- List of symphony orchestras in Taiwan
- Evergreen Marine
- EVA Air
