= Loukas Daralas =

Loukas Daralas (Greek: Λουκάς Νταράλας) (1927 – June 12, 1977) was born in Athens and is perhaps best known as the father of contemporary singer George Dalaras. He was a performer of Rebetiko music in Greece during the 1950s and early 1960s and is famous for the song "To Vouno" ("The Mountain"), a well-known rebetiko song. He released the album Enas Rebetis.

According to the surviving relatives of famous rebetissa Marika Ninou, in an interview with Panos Geramanis on radio in late 2004, Marika Ninou was the one who discovered, hence the first singer to record "To Vouno", one of the last songs recorded by Ninou, prior to her death. The Keti Grei version was issued a short while later and became very popular.

Loukas Daralas' recordings were few. There were only two official releases on the now defunct Sonora label. The first being Enas Rebetis, which included his own rendition of "To Vouno". The LP was a compilation of his own songs and 11 other pieces. A follow-up LP was released a year later in 1975. However it did not achieve the success of the first LP.

Both LPs are now available on the PolyGram label on one CD. The rarity of the original releases has resulted in copies of the two LPs being much sought after.

Little is known about Loukas Daralas. He was born in Athens in 1927 and died in 1977. In an interview, George Dalaras once described his father as a free man who travelled a lot and seldom spent time at home.
