= Tsegmidiin Namsraijav =

Mongolian composer

Tsegmidiin Namsraijav (Mongolian: Цэгмидийн Намсрайжав; 1927–1987) was a Mongolian composer. He is perhaps best known for the melody to the popular song "Khaluun elgen nutag" (Халуун элгэн нутаг, Country of the Heart), his Festive Overture (Баярын жавхаа удиртгал) composed in 1971, and his "Baatarlag Marsh" (Heroic March). He was the first conductor of the Mongolian Symphony Orchestra after its establishment in 1957.
