= Taipei Century Symphony Orchestra =

- Orchestra
- Founded: 1968
- Location: Taipei, Taiwan
- Website: www.century.org.tw

The Taipei Century Symphony Orchestra (Chinese: 台北世紀交響樂團; pinyin: Táiběi Shìjì Jiāoxiǎng Yuètuán) is one of the oldest symphony orchestras in Taiwan.

== History ==
The orchestra was established by prof. Liao Nian-Fu in 1968.

== See also ==
- List of symphony orchestras in Taiwan
