= Mr Switch =

- Birth name: Anthony John Culverwell
- Origin: Birmingham, UK
- Genres: Hip hop, drum and bass, electronica
- Occupation: DJ
- Years active: 2001–present
- Website: www.djswitchbeatz.co.uk

Anthony John Culverwell, known professionally as Mr Switch (formerly DJ Switch), is a British DJ and turntablist, based in Birmingham. He has been crowned world champion three times.

== Notable achievements ==
Switch won the DMC World DJ Championships (specifically in the 'Battle For Supremacy' category) in 2008. He successfully defended his title for the next two years, becoming the first person to achieve a triple-win in the supremacy battle.

In 2011, Switch became the first DJ to have ever performed at the BBC Proms. He was the lead soloist in Gabriel Prokofiev's "Concerto For Turntables & Orchestra", conducted by Vladimir Jurowski & performed by the National Youth Orchestra of Great Britain. He has since performed the piece in Venezuela with the Simon Bolivar Youth Orchestra.
