= Khaluun elgen nutag =

Song

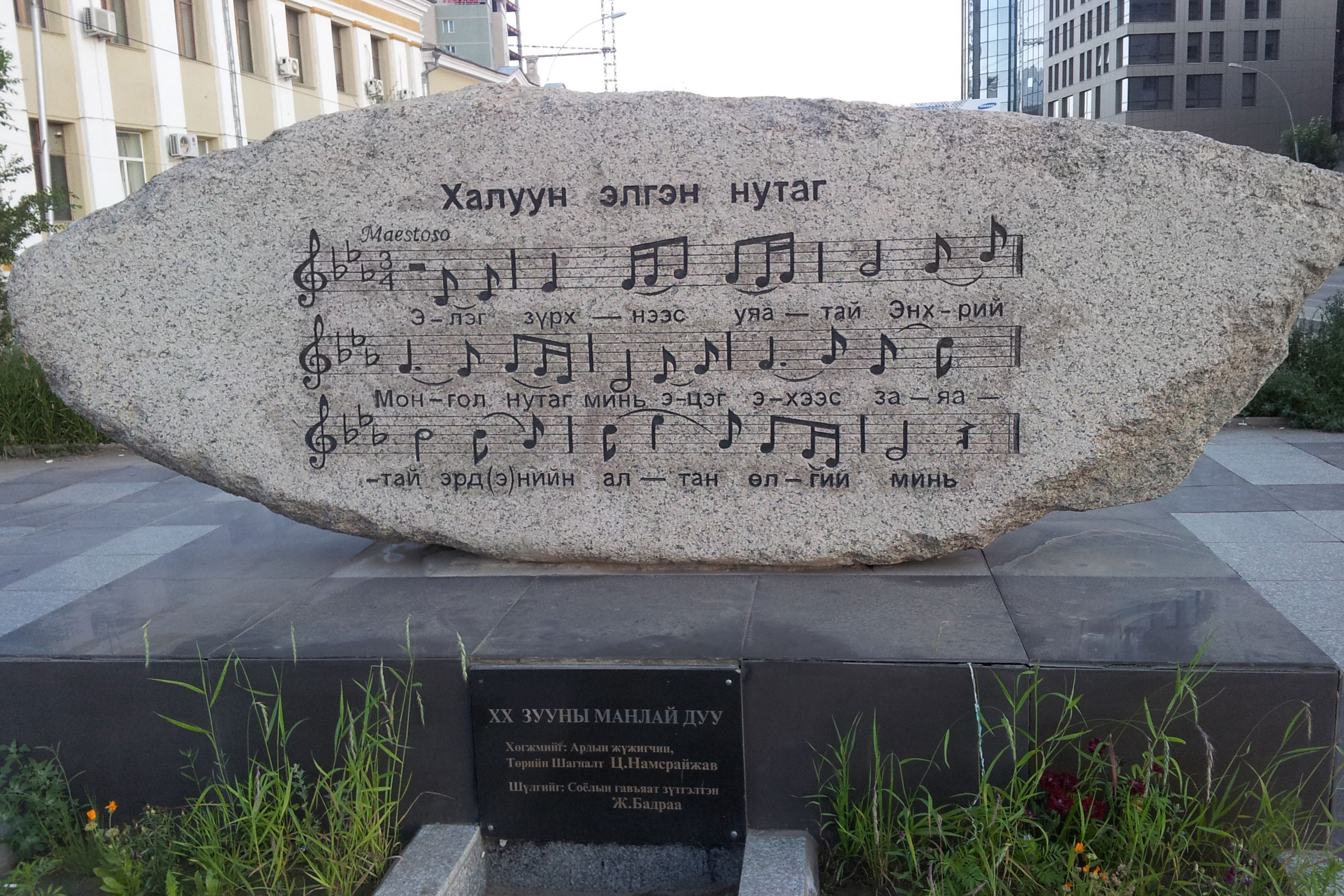
Monument in Ulaanbaatar

"Khaluun elgen nutag" (Mongolian: Халуун элгэн нутаг; lit. 'The Warmth of The Land') is a Mongolian patriotic song. The words were written by Jamtsyn Badraa and the music was composed by Tsegmidiin Namsraijav.

A monument showing the lyrics was dedicated to the song in front of the Ministry of Foreign Affairs in Ulaanbaatar.

== Lyrics ==
=== Mongolian original ===
Cyrillic script

Элэг зүрхнээс уяатай
Энхрий Монгол нутаг минь
Эцэг эхээс заяатай
Эрдэнийн алтан өлгий минь

Цэцгийн шимийг тэтгэсэн
Цэнгэлийн хавар айлчилхад
Мөрөн голоо нь дуугаа дуулж
Мөнх сарьдаг аа нь мишээдэг ээ

Сэрүүн салхи сэвсүүлсэн
Хацар нүүрийг илбэн байж
Сэтгэл дотрыг ариулсан
Халуун элгэн нутаг минь

Classical script

ᠡᠯᠢᠭᠡ ᠵᠢᠷᠦᠬᠡᠨ ᠡᠴᠡ ᠤᠶᠠᠭ᠎ᠠ ᠲᠠᠢ
ᠡᠩᠬᠦᠷᠡᠢ ᠮᠣᠩᠭᠣᠯ ᠨᠤᠲᠤᠭ ᠮᠢᠨᠢ
ᠡᠴᠢᠭᠡ ᠡᠬᠡ ᠡᠴᠡ ᠵᠠᠶᠠᠭ᠎ᠠ ᠲᠠᠢ
ᠡᠷᠳᠡᠨᠢ ᠶᠢᠨ ᠠᠯᠲᠠᠨ ᠥᠯᠥᠭᠡᠢ ᠮᠢᠨᠢ

ᠴᠡᠴᠡᠭ ᠦᠨ ᠰᠢᠮ᠎ᠡ ᠶᠢ ᠲᠡᠳᠬᠦᠭᠰᠡᠨ
ᠴᠡᠩᠭᠡᠯ ᠦᠨ ᠬᠠᠪᠤᠷ ᠠᠶᠢᠯᠴᠢᠯᠬ᠎ᠠ ᠳᠤ
ᠮᠥᠷᠡᠨ ᠭᠣᠣᠯ ᠢᠶᠠᠨ ᠨᠢ ᠳᠠᠭᠤᠤ ᠶᠢ ᠪᠠᠨ ᠳᠠᠭᠤᠯᠠᠵᠤ
ᠮᠥᠩᠬᠡ ᠰᠠᠷᠢᠳᠠᠭ ᠠ᠋ ᠨᠢ ᠮᠥᠰᠢᠶᠡᠳᠡᠭ ᠡ

ᠰᠡᠷᠢᠭᠦᠨ ᠰᠠᠯᠬᠢ ᠰᠡᠪᠰᠡᠭᠦᠯᠦᠭᠰᠡᠨ
ᠬᠠᠴᠠᠷ ᠨᠡᠭᠦᠷᠢ ᠶᠢ ᠢᠯᠪᠢᠨ ᠪᠠᠶᠢᠵᠤ
ᠰᠡᠳᠬᠢᠯ ᠳᠣᠲᠣᠷ ᠢ ᠠᠷᠢᠭᠤᠯᠠᠭᠰᠠᠨ
ᠬᠠᠯᠠᠭᠤᠨ ᠡᠯᠢᠭᠡᠨ ᠨᠤᠲᠤᠭ ᠮᠢᠨᠢ

Latin script

Eleg zürkhnees uyaatai
Enkhrii Mongol nutag mini
Eceg ekhees zayaatai
Erdeniin altan ölgii mini

Cecgiin shimiig tetgesen
Cengeliin khawar ailchilkhad
Mörön goloo-ni duugaa duulj
Mönkh saridag aa-ni misheedeg ee

Serüün salkhi sewsüülsen
Khacar nüüriig ilben baij
Setgel dotriig ariulsan
Khaluun elgen nutag mini
