= Algerian National Theater Mahieddine Bachtarzi =

Theatre in Algiers, Algeria

Coordinates: 36.7811°N 3.0603°E

Théâtre National Algérien Mahieddine Bachtarzi
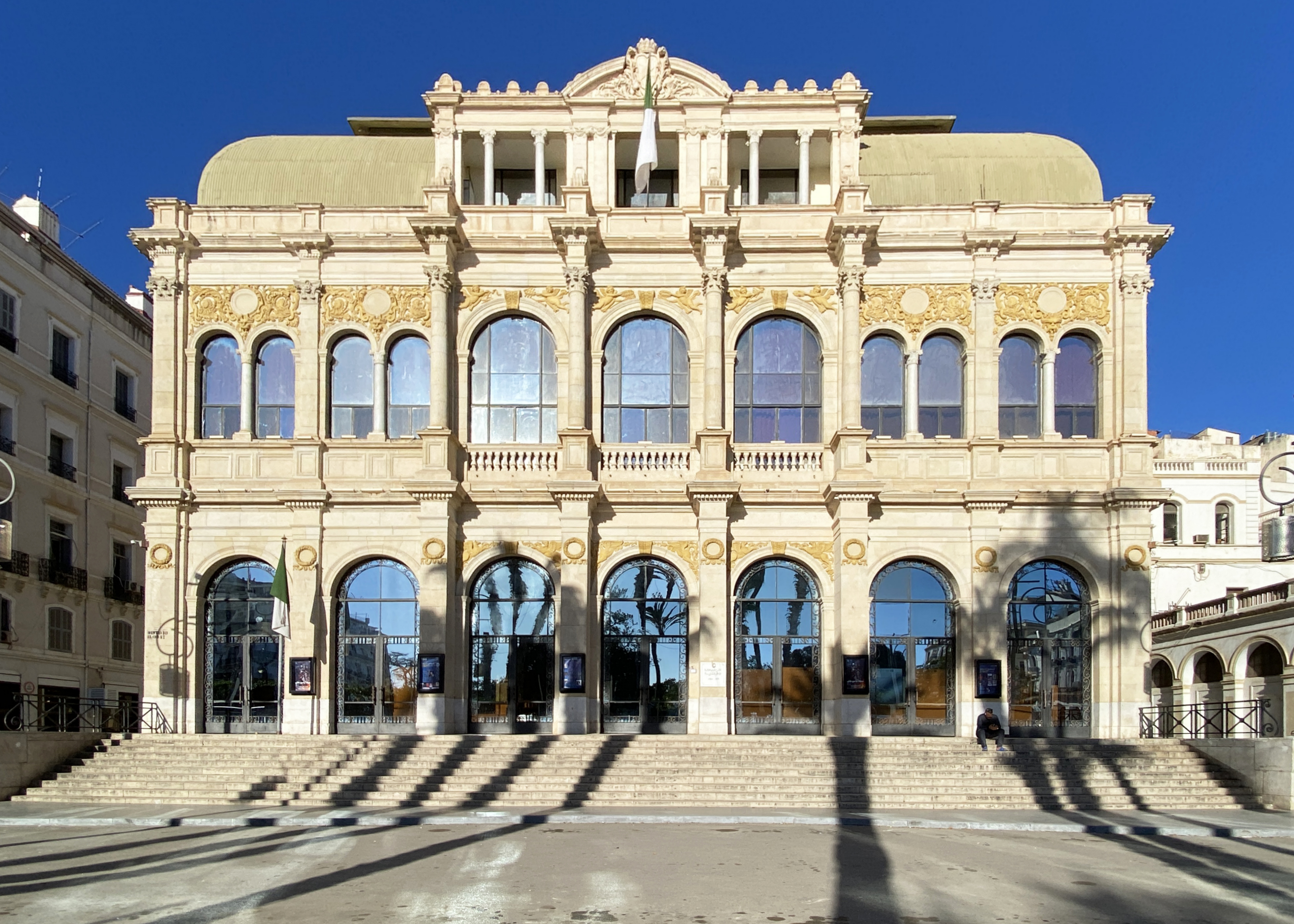
- The Mahieddine Bachtazi Theatre
- Interactive map of the Théâtre National Algérien Mahieddine Bachtarzi area

General information
- Location: Algiers, Algeria
- Construction started: 1850
- Completed: 1853

Design and construction
- Architects: Charles Frédéric Chassériau; Justin Ponsard

The Théâtre National Algérien Mahieddine Bachtarzi, formerly known as the Algiers Opera House, is a historic building in Algiers, Algeria. It was built from 1850 to 1853. It was designed by architects Charles Frédéric Chassériau and Justin Ponsard in the Baroque Revival style. After it caught fire in 1883, it was rebuilt from the ground up.

== See also ==
- Algiers Opera House
