= Murmansk Philharmonic Orchestra =

Russian orchestra

- Orchestra
- Native name: Мурманский Филармонический Оркестр
- Founded: 1975
- Concert hall: Murmansk Philharmonia Hall

The Murmansk Philharmonic Orchestra is an orchestra based in Murmansk, Russia. It is currently the largest full professional orchestra in the Barents region. It is funded by the regional government of Murmansk.

== History ==
The Murmansk Regional Philharmonic Society was founded in 1975, when the concert and variety bureau was reformed into a philharmonic. The Murmansk Philharmonic Orchestra has its own hall built in 1994, which was revamped in 2016 as part of a large plan for the centennial of Murmansk. In 1999, the main orchestra of the philharmonic society was formed under its current name, the Murmansk Philharmonic Orchestra, and performed under the baton of English conductor Damian Iorio.

It has been decorated with the Order "For Merit to the Fatherland" II class, Russia's highest civilian honor.

== Concerts ==
The orchestra performs in its own concert hall in the centre of the city. It has performed around the region such as in St. Petersburg, Norway, Sweden, and often go on concert tours in the Kola Peninsula. The orchestra also performs regularly with the Norwegian National Opera and Ballet.

== Repertoire ==
The orchestra repertoire ranges from Baroque to Contemporary music, with the core Russian repertoire at its centre. It has performed the operas Tosca, La Traviata, Eugene Onegin, La bohème, and Madama Butterfly together with the Norwegian National Opera and Ballet.

== Conductors ==
Chief Conductors

- Damian Iorio (1999–2005)
- Terje Boye Hanson (2005–2008)
- Jukka-Pekka Kuusela (2008–2011)

The post of Chief Conductor has been vacant since 2011, and the orchestra has been led by guest conductors hired for each concert.
