= National Children's Wind Sinfonia of Great Britain =

National Children's Wind Sinfonia of Great Britain (NCWS)
- Orchestra
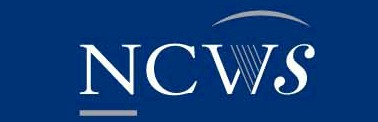
- Location: London, UK
- Principal conductor: Gill Bathurst

The National Children's Wind Sinfonia of Great Britain (NCWS) is the most junior of the national-level wind ensembles in Great Britain. Most players aspire to join the National Youth Wind Ensemble of Great Britain when they are older and more experienced. The aim of this group is to gain experience and to partake in the "sheer joy of music".

== History ==
NCWO was formed as a stepping-stone to the National Children's Wind Orchestra of Great Britain and similarly to this group there is no compromise on difficulty of music for the age of performers.

It is one of the few Children's Ensembles in the country to offer the experience of the level of music and of the way in which the more senior National groups work. The standard required of the children to apply for audition is Grade 5 and they must be over the age of 10, and usually under 14.
