= Cali Philharmonic Orchestra =

- Native name: Orquesta Filarmónica de Cali
- Short name: OFC
- Founded: 2002
- Location: Cali, Colombia
- Website: orquestafilarmonicadecali.com

The Cali Philharmonic Orchestra (Spanish: Orquesta Filarmónica de Cali (OFC)) is a Colombian orchestra based in based in Cali, Valle del Cauca, Colombia. It is the only professional orchestra in the southwest of Colombia and the smallest in the country, considered one of the oldest symphonic groups with a long history of more than 80 years and one of the most prestigious symphonic groups together with the National Symphony Orchestra of Colombia and the Philharmonic Orchestra of Medellín.

Since 2021, the Orchestra is being directed by Francesco Belli.

== Principal conductors ==
- Antonio María Valencia
- León J. Simar
- Luis Carlos Figeroa Sierra
- Gustavo Yepes
- Agustin Cullell
- Dimitri Manolov
- François Dolmetsch
- Paul Dury
- Ricardo Jaramillo
- Eduardo Carrizosa
- Irwin Hoffman
- Adrián Chamorro
- Jorge Mario Uribe
- Francesco Belli

== See also ==
- List of symphony orchestras
