= Chimei Philharmonic Orchestra =

Taiwanese symphony orchestra

- Orchestra
- Native name: 奇美愛樂管弦樂團
- Former name: Chimei Symphony Orchestra
- Founded: 2003
- Music director: Lu Ching-ming

Chimei Philharmonic Orchestra (Chinese: 奇美愛樂管弦樂團; pinyin: Qíměi Aiyuè Guǎnxiányuè Tuán), formerly known as Chimei Symphony Orchestra (Chinese: 奇美管絃樂團), is a Taiwanese symphony orchestra organized in 2003 by Chi Mei Group, an international plastics producer and liquid crystal display maker.

In early 2007, they changed their name to Chimei Philharmonic Orchestra and appointed Lu Ching-ming the new music director.

== Music directors and chief conductors ==
- (Japan) Naoki Tokuoka (徳岡直樹), ?-2007
- (Taiwan) Lu Ching-ming (呂景民), 2007–present

== See also ==
- Evergreen Symphony Orchestra
- List of symphony orchestras in Taiwan
