= Turkmenistan State Symphony Orchestra =

Based in Ashgabat, Turkmenistan

State Symphony Orchestra of Turkmenistan
- Orchestra
- Founded: 2008
- Location: Ashgabat, Turkmenistan

The State Symphony Orchestra of Turkmenistan (SSOT) is based in Ashgabat, Turkmenistan. The State Symphony Orchestra of Turkmenistan was founded on the initiative and under the patronage of the President of Turkmenistan in 2008.

== History ==
The orchestra has included famous musicians, laureates of international and national competitions, and talented young graduates of the Turkmen National Conservatory.

The first concert of the State Symphony Orchestra of Turkmenistan, conducted by Meritorious Artist Orazgeldi Berdiyev, was held in February 2008. The concert program was consisted of works by prominent Turkmen and foreign composers.

== Principal conductors ==
- Orazgeldi Berdiyev (2008–?)
- Rasul Klychev (?–incumbent)
