= Mongolian Symphony Orchestra =

Mongolian orchestra

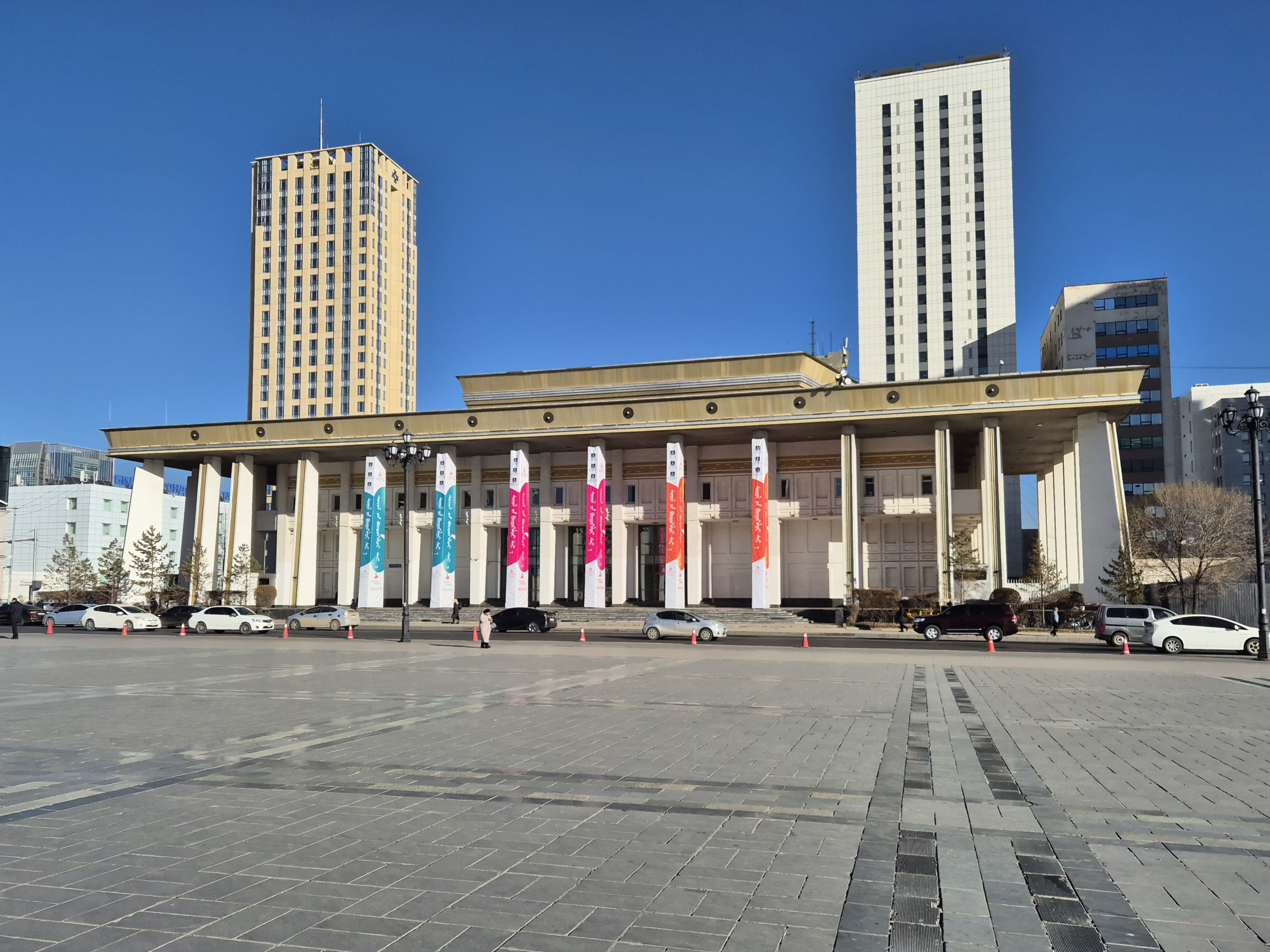
Central Cultural Palace, where the Mongolian Symphony Orchestra is based at

The Mongolian Symphony Orchestra or Mongolian Philharmonic (Mongolian: Монгол Улсын Филармони) was established on 5 June 1957 under the 118th decree by the ministry of culture becoming one of the earliest in Asia. Tsegmidiin Namsraijav was the first conductor.

On June 15, 2012, a Laural Gala Concert was held to celebrate the 55th anniversary of the orchestra and Namsraijav's 85th birthday.
