= Çukurova State Symphony Orchestra =

Symphony orchestra in Adana, Turkey

The Çukurova State Symphony Orchestra (Turkish: Çukurova Devlet Senfoni Orkestrası) is a symphony orchestra based in Adana, Turkey. It is affiliated with the Turkish Ministry of Culture and Tourism's General Directorate of Fine Arts. Founded officially in 1988, it was the fourth state symphony orchestra established in Turkey after the Presidential Symphony Orchestra, the Istanbul State Symphony Orchestra and the İzmir State Symphony Orchestra.

== History ==
The orchestra was formally established in 1988, reportedly through the initiative of conductor Hikmet Şimşek, and began its first rehearsals in the final months of 1991 with a small ensemble of 17 musicians under the direction of Emin Güven Yaşlıçam. Its first concert was held on 5 January 1992, the anniversary of Adana's liberation from occupation, at the Adana Metropolitan Municipality Concert Hall. The orchestra subsequently expanded its personnel through auditions and continued its regular concerts with support from the Çukurova Philharmonic Association and guest musicians from other symphony orchestras, opera and ballet orchestras and state conservatories.

The orchestra's regular venue is the Adana Metropolitan Municipality Concert Hall in the Seyhan district of Adana. Alongside its symphonic concerts, the ensemble has presented educational and outreach concerts in schools, districts and villages, and has also given concerts for prison staff and inmates and for workers in cotton fields, as part of its aim to introduce polyphonic music outside conventional concert-hall settings.

The orchestra has undertaken tours and guest performances in Turkey and abroad, including concerts in Tarsus, İskenderun, Diyarbakır, Malatya, Trabzon, Mersin, Gaziantep, Antalya, Ankara, Istanbul, Elazığ, Cyprus, Syria, Germany, Azerbaijan and Japan. During a Japan tour, it recorded Tchaikovsky's Piano Concerto No. 1 and Symphony No. 5. Between 2000 and 2006 it gave regular concerts at the Aspendos ancient theatre in Antalya during May and September.

The orchestra has appeared at festivals including the Side International Music Festival, the Mersin International Music Festival, the Qabala International Music Festival in Azerbaijan, the Bellapais International Music Festival in Cyprus, the Bodrum D-Marin International Music Festival, the Adana Golden Boll Film Festival and the Adana International Orange Blossom Carnival. At the 13th Mersin International Music Festival in 2014, the orchestra opened the festival with British violinist Charlie Siem under conductor İbrahim Yazıcı.

Several large-scale thematic projects have formed part of the orchestra's activity. The Harput Symphony, based on symphonic arrangements of folk songs from Elazığ and Harput, was first presented in Elazığ and later repeated in Ankara and Istanbul. The orchestra has also presented projects such as Senfoni ile İlahiler and Senfoni ile Türküler, and has performed at open-air historical sites, including a concert at Mount Nemrut despite difficult weather conditions. In 2015, its closing concert for the Adana International Orange Blossom Carnival was reported by the orchestra's official history to have reached an audience of approximately 100,000 people.

In 2018, the orchestra launched the Senfonik Saz Eserleri project with tambur virtuoso Murat Salim Tokaç, aiming to present traditional Turkish instrumental works in a symphonic context; the project was recorded on CD and presented in Adana and Istanbul. The orchestra also gives annual "Ancient Cities Concerts" in historical sites around Turkey under the title Senfoni ile Müziğimiz.

== Guest artists and conductors ==
The Çukurova State Symphony Orchestra has worked with Turkish and international conductors and soloists in its regular seasons, festivals and special projects. Guest artists and conductors associated with the orchestra have included İdil Biret, Gülsin Onay, Charlie Siem, Svetlin Roussev, Emil Tabakov, Rengim Gökmen, İbrahim Yazıcı, Murat Cem Orhan, Rumon Gamba, Nayden Todorov, Orhan Şallıel, Batuğhan Uzgören, Ferhat Can Büyük, Başar Can Kıvrak, Bülent Evcil, Çağatay Akyol, Murat Salim Tokaç, Tülay Uyar and Ayhan Uştuk.

In 2015, the orchestra commemorated the 70th anniversary of the death of Béla Bartók with a concert in Adana under İbrahim Yazıcı, with İdil Biret as soloist in Bartók's piano concerto.
