= Alexander Polishchuk =

Russian conductor

Alexander Polishchuk (Russian: Александр Полищук) is a Russian conductor and Meritorious Artist.

== Conductor ==
Polishchuk graduated from Saint Petersburg Conservatory in 1991 and after it worked as an assistant to Professor Ilya Musin following by 1988 winning at the All-Union Conductors’ Competition. Since 1990 he has conducted numerous works at both Mariinsky Theatre and Saint Petersburg Philharmonic. As his fame grew nationally, he began to do international performances as well with Covent Garden's Royal Opera House being his first international place for performance. There, her performed one of the Red Square's concerts with Russian National Orchestra after which he returned to Russia. When he returned, he continued collaboration among Russian ballet and theatres such as the Yekaterinburg Opera and Ballet Theatre and Kyiv Opera.

From 1989 to 1991, he worked with Helikon Opera and both Bolshoi and Mikhaylovsky Theatres, with which he had international performances as well. By 1991 he became a principal conductor of the St. Petersburg Municipal Symphony Orchestra where he served till 1995 and then next year became Saint Petersburg State Symphony Orchestra's artistic director and principal conductor.

Two years later he became guest conductor-in-chief of the Russian Chamber Orchestra in London and in the beginning of the 21st century till 2008 held the same positions at the Chamber Orchestra of the Novosibirsk Philharmonic and worked as a conductor of both the Saint Petersburg House of Music and Novosibirsk Philharmonic with which society he also toured the world. He has performed his work throughout all former Soviet Union republics and traveled throughout Europe (except the Balkans, the Mediterranean states, Norway, Spain and states of former Yugoslavia). He also traveled to such Asian countries as Japan, Singapore and Taiwan at which he performed at such places as Classical Nights in Megève, and various Christmas Festivals such as Musical Kremlin and Classic and Modern at Novosibirsk. While being in France he appeared at both Music in the Mountains and Pablo Casals Festival which were followed by German and Swiss festivals as well. It is important to mention that from 1995 to 2002 professor Polishchuk was an artistic director of the Peter the Great Master Class and Workshop and from 1998 to 1999 was a guest professor and conductor of the Royal Academy College of Music as well.
