= National Youth String Orchestra =

- Youth orchestra
- Former name: National ISIS Strings Academy (NISA)
- Founded: 1995
- Principal conductor: Damian Iorio
- Website: www.nyso.uk

The National Youth Strings Orchestra (NYSO) was founded by Viviane Ronchetti in 1995 and is a specialist string chamber youth orchestra based in the United Kingdom. Initially founded as the National ISIS Strings Academy (NISA), in 2005 the orchestra was renamed the National Youth Strings Academy and became a company limited by guarantee Charity no. 1110462. Its name was changed again in 2013 to National Youth String Orchestra to clarify its classification as an orchestra.

NYSO's Music Director is Damian Iorio.

The orchestra celebrated its 5th anniversary with a concert at St John's, Smith Square in London conducted by Sir Neville Marriner, who also made his fourth appearance with the orchestra at a gala concert at St John's in 2011.

== Tours ==
The orchestra has given concerts in various parts of England, including London, Birmingham, Leeds, York, Aldeburgh, Oxford and The Sage Gateshead, in Wales and in Scotland, where it has made repeat visits to the Aberdeen International Youth Festival. NYSO performed at the Three Choirs Festival in 2016 and Lake District Summer Music in 2018. In 2026 the orchestra performed at the Snape Maltings Concert Hall in Suffolk.

The orchestra toured in Italy in 2007 and 2012, including performances at La Mortella, Ischia, at the invitation of the William Walton Trust. It also toured in the United States of America in 1999, 2001, when it performed at the Kennedy Center Millennium Stage and 2006. In 2015 the orchestra toured Denmark.

== Notable people associated with the orchestra ==
=== Patrons ===
- Sir Neville Marriner C.B.E.
- Sir Mark Elder C.B.E.
- Dr. Jane Glover
- Alina Ibragimova

data from unless noted

=== Trustees ===
- Charles Clark (Chairman of the Board)
- David Woodhead
- Richard Davison
- John Bimson
- Alison Pickard
- Louise Lansdowne

data from

== See also ==
- List of youth orchestras
