= Olavarria Symphony Orchestra =

The Olavarria Municipal Orchestra is an Argentinian orchestra based in Olavarria. Founded in 1961, it is based in the Municipal Theatre of Olavarria and is considered one of the most prestigious orchestras in its nation.

== History ==
Since its creation in 1961 the Municipal Orchestra Stable, current Municipal Symphony Orchestra, he has performed extensively in Olavarria and a wide area in the center of the Province of Buenos Aires; in addition to several presentations in major cities like Buenos Aires by National Radio and Television Channel 7; in Mar del Plata on channel 8 and the Teatro Solis in Montevideo, concerts giving hierarchy and renown to the orchestra.

It stresses that the Olavarría Symphonic Orchestra was one of the first Argentine orchestras that performed since 1961 a comprehensive and continuous cycle of educational concerts at elementary schools. From the date of its creation performed more than 500 concerts.

After a hiatus of seven years of inactivity, the Municipal Symphony Orchestra, under the direction of its owner, the master Mario Patané, resumed his cultural work in 1993, with the support of the municipal authorities and the community of Olavarria.

During the 1994 season featured 24 Symphony concerts.

During the 1997 season the Symphonic Orchestra of Olavarria offered symphony concerts in the cities of Bolivar, Henderson, Daireaux and the Golden Hall of the Municipality of La Plata (second year).

Orchestra depends on the Department of Culture and Education of the Municipality of Olavarria.
