= Algiers Opera House =

Opéra d'Alger
- أوبرا الجزائر
- Interactive map of the Opéra d'Alger area

General information
- Type: Opera
- Location: Algiers, Algeria
- Coordinates: 36.73716°N 2.93020°E
- Construction started: 2016
- Owner: Ministry of Culture and Arts

Algiers Opera House is an opera house in Ouled Fayet, Algiers, Algeria. It was built in 2016 by the Chinese government. The former opera house is the Algerian National Theater Mahieddine Bachtarzi.
