= Sheila Nelson =

English string teacher

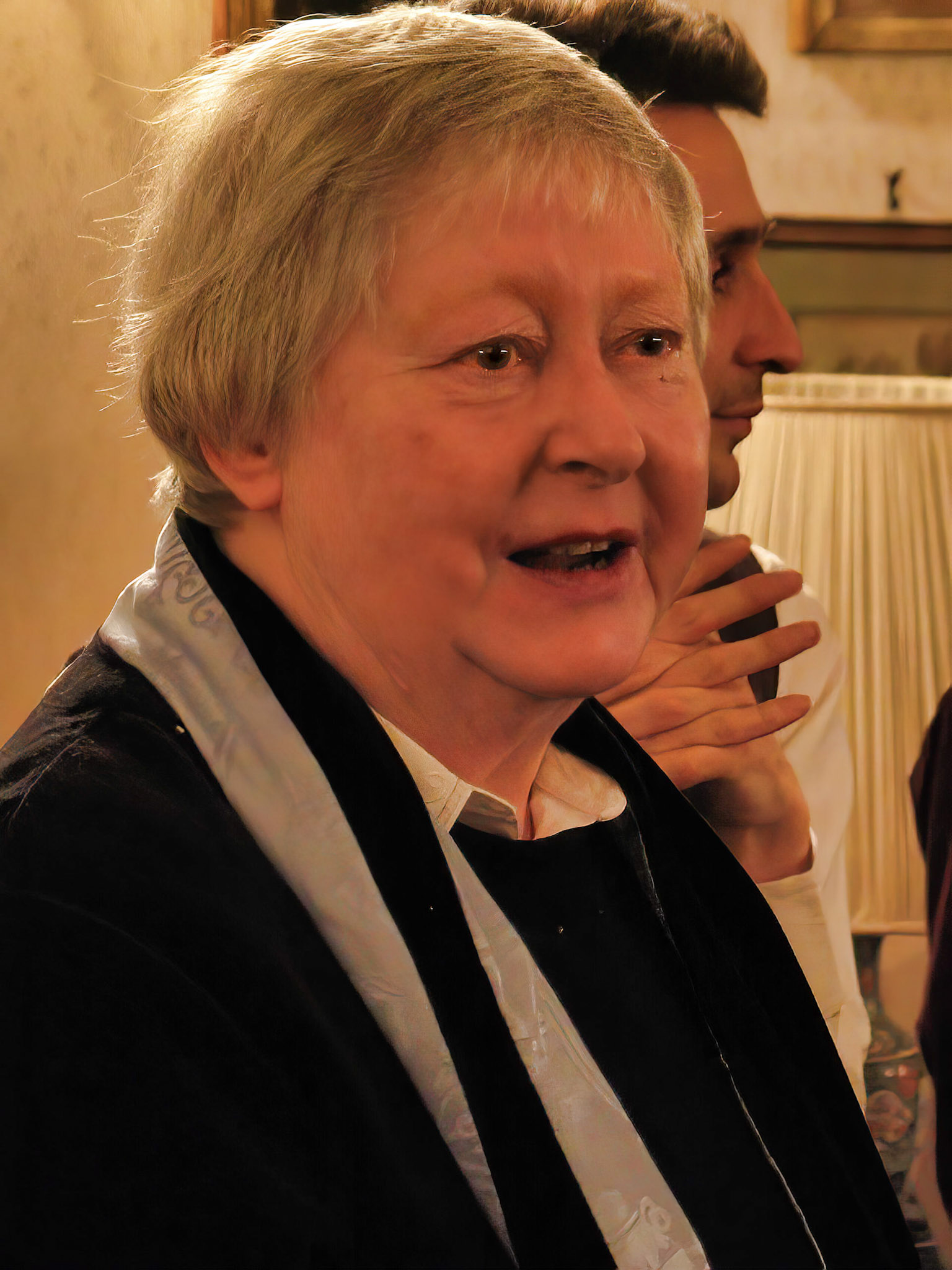
- Nelson at her 70th birthday party, London, March 2006
- Born: Sheila Mary Nelson; 5 March 1936; Manchester, England
- Died: 16 November 2020 (aged 84)
- Education: Royal College of Music; London University; University of Birmingham
- Occupations: Violin and viola teacher; Composer; Writer; Academic teacher; Violinist; Violist

Sheila Mary Nelson (5 March 1936 – 16 November 2020) was an English musician, music educator, writer and composer. She had played with the English Chamber Orchestra, the Royal Philharmonic Orchestra and the Menuhin Festival Orchestra but was best known as a violin and viola teacher. She is usually referred to as Sheila Nelson but appears in her published works as Sheila M. Nelson.

== Biography ==
Nelson studied at the Royal College of Music and had a B.Mus degree from London University. She also studied at the University of Birmingham and in Denmark. In 1976 she went to the United States on a Churchill Fellowship to study with the eminent string pedagogue Paul Rolland, and in the 1980s directed an innovative group-teaching project in the London Borough of Tower Hamlets. The Tower Hamlets Project taught strings and piano to whole school classes in a deprived area of London, and was featured in a six-part TV documentary series, Beginners Please.

Nelson was co-author of the Essential String Method series and author/composer of many other music instruction and repertoire books, published by Boosey & Hawkes. She was an Honorary Member of the Royal Academy of Music (Hon RAM), a distinction limited to 300 musicians.

Nelson died aged 84 on 16 November 2020 having lived with Alzheimer's disease in her final years.

== Publications ==
Nelson was a prolific writer and composer. Selected works include:

- Christmas Tunes for strings
- Technitunes for individual strings or ensemble
- Octotunes for individual strings or ensemble
- Quartet Club for string quartet
- Stringsongs for violin/viola and piano
- The Violin and Viola: History, Structure, Techniques. 1972 book republished 2003
