= Colin Touchin =

British conductor and educator (1953–2022)

Colin Michael Touchin (3 April 1953 – 30 September 2022) was a British conductor, composer and music educator. His compositions include two oratorios, four orchestral sinfoniettas, and works for wind band and choral groups.

== Biography ==
Colin Touchin was educated at William Hulme's Grammar School and Keble College, Oxford.

Touchin taught for eight years at Chetham's School of Music, and for two years was Head of Composition. For over a decade he was Director of Music at the University of Warwick. While in the UK he played in a piano duo with his friend Peter Donohoe. In 2005 he founded and conducted the Spires Philharmonic Orchestra and Chorus in Coventry, made up of professional and skilled amateur musicians from the Coventry and Warwickshire area. Spires recorded a CD of his compositions in 2012. He also conducted West Midland Wind Orchestra

In Frankfurt he was Chief Conductor of the Lufthansa Orchestra, an ensemble made up of pilots, flight attendants, technicians and office workers who make music in their spare time. In Hong Kong he was musical director of the Hong Kong Welsh Male Voice Choir, the a capella female choir Grace Notes, and guest conductor of the City Chamber Orchestra of Hong Kong and Tak-Ming Philharmonic Winds.

His home was in Warsaw, where he died of pancreatic cancer.

== Selected works ==
- A Beade of Amber (for the National Youth Wind Orchestra of Wales)
- Brief Intervals for saxophone quartet
- Choose the Light, oratorio (2012)
- Coventry Suite for orchestra
- Hilarion, oratorio for baritone, choir and orchestra (1987)
- Idyllwild Suite for wind band
- Impressions of Don Giovanni, chamber ensemble (1991)
- in memoriam Cathy, chamber ensemble
- Lambs & Tygers for chorus and orchestra
- Little Red Riding Hood, ballet for youth orchestra
- Saint George of Coventry, chorus and orchestra
- Sinfonietta No 2 for orchestra (1982)
- Sinfonietta No.4 for orchestra (2021)
- Sonatella for piano (1990)
- Three Suffolk Pictures for wind band
- Yon twelve-winded sky for string quartet (1991)
