= Western Australian Charity Orchestra =

Western Australia not–for–profit orchestra

Western Australian Charity Orchestra Inc
- Philharmonic orchestra
- Short name: WACO
- Founded: 2008
- Location: Perth, Western Australia
- Concert hall: Perth Concert Hall (Western Australia)
- Principal conductor: Samuel Parry
- Website: www.waco.org.au

Western Australian Charity Orchestra Inc (WACO) is a not-for-profit charity organisation dedicated to changing lives through music. Their current ensembles include a full symphony orchestra – the West Coast Philharmonic, the West Coast Philharmonic Chorus and the WA Wind Symphony – all based in Perth, Western Australia. All ensembles are made up almost entirely of volunteers, and for many years the WACO produced concerts to help fund-raise for Western Australian charities. In 2017 WACO Inc became an Australian Registered charity in their own right, and now their volunteers work in the community to make a difference first-hand in the lives of others.

== History ==
The Western Australian Charity Orchestra was founded in 2008 by Samuel Parry, a music student at WAAPA. The organisation was formed with the twin aims of raising money for deserving causes by providing musicians with opportunities to fundraise for charities, and bringing music and joy into the community. From 2008 to 2016 the organisation held eight concert seasons, and in its 2016 season WACO raised $19,000 for Guide Dogs WA.

From 2008 to 2009 and 2013–2016, WACO produced an annual summer series featuring the Western Australian Charity Orchestra and Choir. In 2017 the organisation expanded into four full-time ensembles including an orchestra, wind symphony, chorale and youth concert band.

From 2015 to 2016 WACO ran the North Coast Youth Concert Band (NCYCB), a concert band created for high school students mainly for players from Perth's northern suburbs.

WACO is a not-for-profit incorporated organisation and an Australian Registered charity (2017-).

From 2017 onwards, WACO Inc.'s volunteers began working directly in their communities. In 2018-2019, WACO volunteers gave over 40 performances to residents in nursing homes and hospitals.

In February 2020 the Western Australian Charity Orchestra changed its name to the West Coast Philharmonic Orchestra, whilst retaining the WACO name for the incorporated organisation itself.

The orchestra's home is the newly built and fully equipped Churchlands Concert Hall at Churchlands Senior High School. They also regularly perform in the Perth Concert Hall. WACO's ensembles are conducted by founder and music director Samuel Parry.

== Ensembles ==
WACO ensembles include the West Coast Philharmonic Orchestra, West Coast Philharmonic Chorus & WA Wind Symphony and consist of more than 200 volunteer musicians from all walks of life. WACO members include professionals, students, educators, medical and legal professionals, and retirees, united by their love for delivering outstanding musical performances.

=== West Coast Philharmonic Orchestra ===
The West Coast Philharmonic Orchestra, formerly the Western Australian Charity Orchestra, is a community orchestra consisting of more than 50 volunteer musicians. The orchestra performs a variety of traditional, symphonic repertoire alongside contemporary, film and Australian music.

=== West Coast Philharmonic Chorus ===
The West Coast Philharmonic Chorus program is held over the summer holidays, and provides an opportunity to sing great choral music while accompanied by the orchestra.

=== WA Wind Symphony ===
The WA Wind Symphony is a community concert band founded in February 2017. The ensemble provides musicians with the opportunity to challenge the boundaries of instrumental performance, focusing on music written specifically for the symphonic band by composers from all around the world.
