= National Youth Wind Ensemble of Great Britain =

Former youth wind group

Background information
- Also known as: NYWE
- Origin: London, United Kingdom
- Genres: Contemporary
- Occupation: Wind ensemble
- Years active: March 1998 – April 2018

The National Youth Wind Ensemble of Great Britain (NYWE) was a British youth wind ensemble that existed between March 1998 and April 2018.

== History ==
The National Youth Wind Ensemble of Great Britain (NYWE) was originally formed in March 1998 as an élite group of performers from the National Children's Wind Orchestra of Great Britain (NCWO). The group first worked under the name "The National Children's Wind Ensemble", but later changed its name to enable older children to join the ensemble. Members then had to be aged 19 or younger, and of a standard at least equivalent to, or above, Grade 8 and Diploma standard: entry was by audition only.

The ensemble used to rehearse as part of the National Children's Wind Orchestra for the main part, and only occasionally rehearsed as the smaller ensemble group. This changed when the group became a separate entity in 1998. The ensemble was conducted by Phillip Scott.

The ensemble worked on the principle of a single player to each musical part or voice. This approach was unique among British youth wind ensembles performing in the national and international arena, and it helped NYWE to establish an international reputation. The group specialised in the performance of music which has appeared during the previous 20 years, although music of earlier eras was also performed.

The band used around 40 players. In 2007, the band had 43 players.

NYWE frequented such musical conferences and events such as the WASBE (World Association of Symphonic Wind Bands and Ensembles) Conference in Sweden 2003, and Ireland in 2007. It was after NYWE's performance at the 2007 WASBE held at Killarney, Ireland, that conductor, adjudicator, and lecturer Timothy Reynish described NYWE as "one of the best wind groups in the world, with a professionalism unique in the UK and I would guess anywhere". At the WASBE 2007 Conference the ensemble gave performances of the very demanding Philip Grange clarinet concerto "Sheng Sheng Bu Shi" featuring soloist Sarah Williams (former Young Musician of the Year finalist), "Diaghilev Dances" by Kenneth Hesketh, and the world premiere of Joseph Phibbs's "The Spiralling Night", before finishing their programme with Michael Ball's "Omaggio".

NYWE regularly commissions world-renowned composers, such as Joseph Phibbs, Michael Torke, Jacques Cohen, and Anthony Bailey. In July 2009, NYWE gave the world premiere of Cloud Atlas, a major new work by Philip Grange, based on the 2004 Man Booker Prize shortlisted novel by David Mitchell, at the 2009 Cheltenham Music Festival on 12 July 2009.

NYWE attended the 2011 WASBE held in Taiwan, where they performed Percy Grainger's The Immovable Do, "The Ciphering C," Richard Rodney Bennett's Trumpet Concerto (Huw Morgan, soloist), Anthony Gilbert's Dream Carousels, Chiu-Yu Chou's Dream Sun on the Sea, and Philip Grange's Cloud Atlas.

NYWE's final concert was at Saffron Hall in April 2018.

== Recordings ==
The ensemble started making recordings early after its creation, mainly for sale at an event where the ensemble performed. Several live performances were recorded and broadcast on CD and radio, including their appearance at the 2000 BBC Proms Millennium Youth Day at the Royal Albert Hall, was broadcast live on BBC Radio 3.

== See also ==
- National Children's Wind Orchestra of Great Britain
- National Children's Wind Sinfonia of Great Britain
- List of youth orchestras
