= Osipov State Russian Folk Orchestra =

The N. P. Osipov State Russian Folk Orchestra (Russian: Государственный русский народный оркестр имени Н. П. Осипова) is a Russian folk music orchestra. It was founded in 1919 by the balalaika player B. C. Troyanovski.

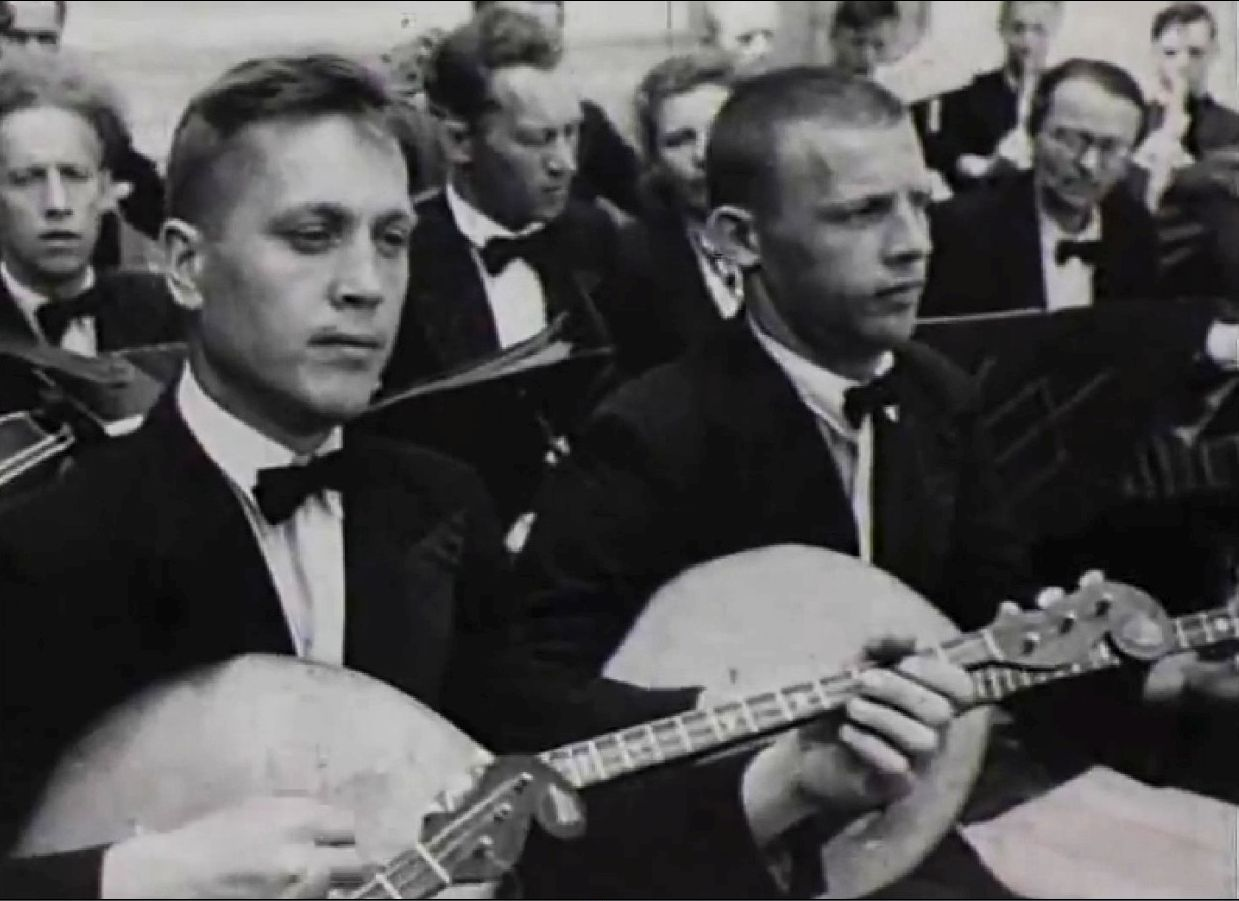
Concert of the Osipov Orchestra in liberated Stalingrad, 1943

The orchestra was renamed after Nikolai Petrovich Osipov who led the orchestra from 1940. He was succeeded by his brother Dmitri Osipov from his death in 1945 to his brother's death in 1954.

Succeeding Nikolai Kalinin in the 21st century as leaders of The Osipov State Russian Folk Orchestra have been Vladimir Ponkin (2005-2009), and Vladimir Andropov (2009–present). Playing only upon traditional Russian instruments, the orchestra presents ethnic Russian music in a style more similar to classical music.

Past soloists include:

- Nina Vysotina (soprano),
- Anatoli Safiullin (bass),
- Boris Nikolaev (bass),
- Vyacheslav Kobzev (bass)
