= Hong Kong Chamber Orchestra =

The Hong Kong Chamber Orchestra (Chinese: 香港室樂團) was founded in 1976 by a small group of musicians who felt that there was a need in Hong Kong for a chamber-sized orchestra aiming at a high standard of music making. The Orchestra consists of around 30 professional and non-professional musicians and gives around ten concerts in Hong Kong each year. Prof. Robert Lord, a professor of linguistics at University of Hong Kong, was the first music director and official founder of the orchestra. The orchestra has been closely associated with HKU right from the start.

In the early years the HKCO did more work with choirs, particularly the Bach Choir. HKCO conductors over the years have included Robert Lord, Peter Stephenson, Nicholas Routley, Malcolm Butler, KK Chiu and Ken Lam.

== Repertoire ==
The Hong Kong Chamber Orchestra has a wide coverage of repertoire from Bach cantatas, to Mozart overtures and Beethoven symphonies, to Elgar, Brahms, Dvořák, Johann Strauss, to Tchaikovsky and Stravinsky. It also gave the Hong Kong première of Richard Strauss's Metamorphosen in June 2005.

== Historic milestones ==
The 2006 season marked the beginning of their 30th year of playing as well as performing as a chamber ensemble without a conductor – a move that will focus itself on better ensembleship among players.

A couple of highlights of HKCO throughout these 30 years include:

- playing the farewell concert in the hall of the old HKSB building before it was demolished. The program included Wagner's Siegfried Idyll.
- doing the farewell concert for VC Rayson Huang in the Loke Yew Hall, HKU. Program included the Farewell Symphony of Haydn and a piece composed by Dr Anne Boyd.
- doing a Hong Kong City Hall concert with Richard Harvey conducting his new Concerto for erhu and guitar.
- performing the HK première of Strauss's Metamorphosen.
