= National Children's Wind Orchestra of Great Britain =

- Also known as: NCWO
- Origin: London, England, United Kingdom
- Genre: Classical
- Occupation: Wind Orchestra
- Members: Conductor; Paul Rissmann; President; David Johnston
- Website: http://www.ncwo.org.uk/ncwo.php?grp=3

The National Children's Wind Orchestra of Great Britain (NCWO) is one of the most accomplished Youth Wind groups in the United Kingdom and is run by the same organisation as that of the National Youth Wind Ensemble of Great Britain.

== History ==
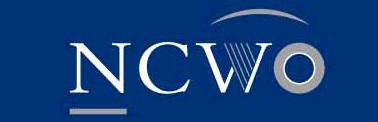
Official National Children's Wind Orchestra of Great Britain logo

NCWO was originally formed to provide a very high level opportunity for Young performers to play at a level which will not compromise on difficulty of music for the age of the performers.

The boys and girls in the group used to rehearse as The National Children's Wind Orchestra for just one residential course a year held in the East School Holidays. This was led by their conductor Phillip Scott who developed the band and drove the standard and popularity of the course up. He still holds the position of Conductor at the present day, but he now conducts the National Youth Wind Ensemble.

Ever since the band was formed, it has been a small group with few players to each part organisation, making it totally unique among British youth bands which played on a national scale. Nowadays there is another National group playing this way called the National Youth Concert Band, with the National Children's Concert Band for younger players, who are part of a different organisation. The National Youth Concert Band has a grade 7 requirement to apply for audition.

Throughout the history of the band they have performed world premieres of pieces such as Thames Journey and Global Variations.
