= İzmir State Symphony Orchestra =

Symphony orchestra based in İzmir, Turkey

The İzmir State Symphony Orchestra (Turkish: İzmir Devlet Senfoni Orkestrası, İZDSO) is a state-sponsored symphony orchestra based in İzmir, Turkey. It operates under the General Directorate of Fine Arts of the Ministry of Culture and Tourism (Turkey).

== History ==
The orchestra was officially established in 1975 at the proposal of Mehmet Özel, then General Director of Fine Arts, and with the approval of Culture Minister Nermin Neftçi. It was founded under the leadership of conductor Hikmet Şimşek, with violinist Tuncer Olcay appointed as its founding director. The ensemble initially began as a chamber-music group, but soon developed into a full symphonic orchestra.

Since its foundation, the orchestra has worked to promote polyphonic music in İzmir, the Aegean Region and other parts of Anatolia. Its activities have included concerts in villages, towns and districts, as well as regular symphonic programmes in İzmir. The orchestra has also organised educational concerts for children and young people, introducing the symphony orchestra, orchestral instruments and Western classical music to new audiences.

The orchestra's early artistic development was associated with Turkish conductors including Hikmet Şimşek, Rengim Gökmen, İbrahim Yazıcı, Emin Güven Yaşlıçam and Hakan Şensoy. Ender Sakpınar served as assistant conductor from 1987 to 2014, and Nesrin Bayramoğulları has continued as assistant conductor from 2017.

With a permanent artistic staff of around 90 musicians, İZDSO is described by the Turkish Ministry of Culture and Tourism as one of Turkey's major artistic institutions. Its regular performance venue is the Ahmed Adnan Saygun Arts Center (Turkish: Ahmed Adnan Saygun Sanat Merkezi, AASSM), named after the Turkish composer Ahmed Adnan Saygun.

== Tours and international appearances ==
The orchestra has represented Turkey in international concerts and festivals in countries including South Korea, Belgium, Germany, Italy, Spain and Japan. Its international activity has also included concerts connected with Turkish national celebrations and cultural diplomacy.

In October 2024, during its 50th artistic season, the orchestra gave Republic Day concerts in Sofia and Bucharest as part of the 101st anniversary celebrations of the Republic of Turkey. On 26 October 2024, İZDSO performed at Bulgaria Hall in Sofia under the direction of Gürer Aykal, with pianist Gökhan Aybulus as soloist. The concert was organised with the support of the Turkish Embassy in Sofia and the Bulgarian Ministry of Culture, and included works by Tchaikovsky, Liszt and Ulvi Cemal Erkin. Turkish media described the Sofia performance as the orchestra's first concert in Bulgaria.

On 29 October 2024, the orchestra appeared at the Romanian Athenaeum in Bucharest under Gürer Aykal, with soprano Otilia Radulescu İpek and cellist Poyraz Baltacıgil as soloists, in a concert hosted in connection with the Turkish Embassy's Republic Day celebrations.

== Collaborations with conductors and soloists ==
The orchestra has worked with Turkish and international conductors including Hikmet Şimşek, Cemal Reşit Rey, Gürer Aykal, Rengim Gökmen, Erol Erdinç, Cem Mansur, Howard Griffiths, Antonio Pirolli, Alexander Vedernikov, Gilbert Varga, Alun Francis, Alexander Rahbari, Emil Tabakov, Alessandro Cedrone, Ari Rasilainen, Christoph-Mathias Mueller, Nayden Todorov, Michal Nesterowicz, Nil Venditti, Holly Choe, Jacek Kaspszyk and Ruth Reinhardt.

It has accompanied a wide range of Turkish and international soloists, including Lazar Berman, Montserrat Caballé, José Carreras, Alirio Díaz, Narciso Yepes, Václav Hudeček, Viktor Pikaizen, Alexander Markov, Igor Oistrakh, Grigory Sokolov, Gheorghe Zamfir, Alexander Knyazev, Elena Bashkirova, Maria Kliegel, Jean-Pierre Rampal, Stefan Dohr, Aziza Mustafa Zadeh, İdil Biret, Suna Kan, Ayla Erduran, Hüseyin Sermet, Gülsin Onay, Fazıl Say, Daniel Stabrawa, Albrecht Mayer, Gilles Apap, Hansjörg Schellenberger, Sabine Meyer, Svetlin Roussev, Sarah Chang, Dan Zhu, Jamal Aliyev, Soyoung Yoon, Kerson Leong, Naoko Shimizu, Szymon Nehring, Alessandro Carbonare, Dmitry Shishkin, Yeol Eum Son, Maximilian Hornung, China Moses, Louis Schwizgebel, Kian Soltani and Augustin Hadelich.

Recent and documented collaborations have included Gürer Aykal with Gökhan Aybulus in the orchestra's Sofia concert in 2024; Gürer Aykal with Poyraz Baltacıgil in a Republic Day programme; Ion Marin in a 2025 concert programme of Beethoven and Tchaikovsky; Albrecht Mayer conducting with pianist Fabian Müller in Beethoven; and Tulio Varas with double bassist Xavier Foley in a 2025 concert programme including Bottesini and Schubert.

== Venue ==
The orchestra's principal performance venue is the Ahmed Adnan Saygun Arts Center in İzmir. The centre, operated by İzmir Metropolitan Municipality, contains concert halls and cultural spaces and is named after composer Ahmed Adnan Saygun, one of the leading figures of twentieth-century Turkish classical music.
