= List of symphony orchestras in Europe =

This is a non-exhaustive list of symphony orchestras in Europe. For orchestras from other continents, see List of symphony orchestras.

== Pan-European orchestras ==
- Chamber Orchestra of Europe
- European Medical Students' Orchestra and Choir
- European Union Youth Orchestra
- Spira Mirabilis
- Ljubljana International Orchestra

== European Union ==
- European Union Baroque Orchestra
- European Union Youth Orchestra
- European Union Chamber Orchestra

== Austria ==
- Ars Antiqua Austria
- Bruckner Orchestra Linz
- Gustav Mahler Youth Orchestra
- Mozarteum Orchestra of Salzburg
- Symphony Orchestra Vorarlberg
- Tonkünstler Orchestra
- Vienna Chamber Orchestra (Das Wiener Kammer Orchester)
- Vienna Mozart Orchestra (Wiener Mozart Orchester)
- Vienna Philharmonic (Wiener Philharmoniker)
- Vienna Radio Symphony Orchestra
- Vienna Symphony (Wiener Symphoniker)
- Wiener Johann Strauss Orchester
- Wiener Jeunesse Orchester (national youth orchestra)

== Baltic States ==
- Kremerata Baltica
- Baltic Sea Philharmonic

== Belgium ==
- Antwerp Symphony Orchestra
- Brussels Philharmonic
- Brussels Philharmonic Orchestra
- National Orchestra of Belgium
- Orchestre Philharmonique de Liège
- Orchestre Royal de Chambre de Wallonie

== Bosnia and Herzegovina ==
- Sarajevo Philharmonic Orchestra

== Bulgaria ==
- Bulgarian National Radio Symphony Orchestra
- New Symphony Orchestra (Sofia)
- Plovdiv Philharmonic Orchestra
- Rousse Philharmonic Orchestra
- Sofia Symphonic Orchestra

== Croatia ==
- Dubrovnik Symphony Orchestra
- Zagreb Philharmonic Orchestra

== Czech Republic ==
- Barocco sempre giovane
- Bohemian Symphony Orchestra Prague
- Brno Philharmonic Orchestra
- Capellen Orchestra
- City of Prague Philharmonic Orchestra
- Czech National Symphony Orchestra
- Czech Philharmonic Orchestra
- Czech Symphony Orchestra (1994) (ČSO)
- Film Symphony Orchestra (FISYO), also known as Czech Symphony Orchestra during Live-Concerts
- Janáček Philharmonic Orchestra
- Moravian Philharmonic
- Praga Sinfonietta Orchestra
- Prague Philharmonia (PKF)
- Prague Philharmonic Orchestra
- Prague Radio Symphony Orchestra (SOČR)
- Prague Symphony Orchestra (FOK/PSO)
- Suk Chamber Orchestra
- Teplice Symphony Orchestra

== Denmark ==
- Aalborg Symphony Orchestra
- Aarhus Symphony Orchestra
- Copenhagen Philharmonic Orchestra
- Danish National Chamber Orchestra
- Danish National Symphony Orchestra
- Danish Youth Ensemble (national youth orchestra)
- Odense Symphony Orchestra
- Royal Danish Orchestra (Det Kongelige Kapel)

== Estonia ==
- Estonian National Symphony Orchestra

== Finland ==
Professional orchestras

- Helsinki Philharmonic Orchestra ("HKO", Finnish: Helsingin kaupunginorkesteri, Swedish: Helsingfors stadsorkester), founded in 1882
- Finnish Radio Symphony Orchestra ("RSO" (eng. "FRSO"), Finnish: Radion sinfoniaorkesteri, Swedish: Radions symfoniorkester), founded in 1927
- Tapiola Sinfonietta (Finnish: Tapiola Sinfonietta, Swedish: Tapiola Sinfonietta – Esbo stadsorkester), founded in 1987
- Lahti Symphony Orchestra (Finnish: Sinfonia Lahti – Lahden kaupunginorkesteri, Swedish: Sinfonia Lahti – Lahtis stadsorkester) founded in 1910
- Tampere Philharmonic Orchestra ("TFO", Finnish: Tampere Filharmonia – Tampereen kaupunginorkesteri, Swedish: Tampere Filharmonia – Tammerfors stadsorkester) founded in 1930
- Turku Philharmonic Orchestra (Finnish: Turku Filharmonia – Turun kaupunginorkesteri, Swedish: Åbo Filharmoniska Orkester – Åbo stadsorkester), founded in 1790
- Jyväskylä Sinfonia founded in 1955
- Oulu Symphony Orchestra (Finnish: Oulu Sinfonia – Oulun kaupunginorkesteri, Swedish: Oulu Sinfonia – Uleåborgs stadsorkester) founded in 1937
- Kymi Sinfonietta (Comprises Kouvola and Kotka City Orchestras) founded in 1999

Chamber orchestras

- Avanti! Chamber Orchestra (Finnish: Avanti! Kamariorkesteri, Swedish: Kammarorkester Avanti!), founded in 1983
- Lapland Chamber Orchestra, founded in 1972 (Finnish; Lapin kamariorkesteri)
- Ostrobothnian Chamber Orchestra

University and conservatorio orchestras

- Ylioppilaskunnan Soittajat ("YS", English: Helsinki University Symphony Orchestra, Swedish: Helsingfors Universitets studentorkester), founded in 1747 (1926)
- The Polytech Orchestra ("PO", Finnish: Polyteknikkojen orkesteri, Swedish: Polyteknikernas orkester), founded in 1922

== France ==
- Concerts Colonne (Paris), founded in 1873
- Concerts Lamoureux (Paris), founded in 1881
- Concerts Pasdeloup (Paris), founded in 1861
- Ensemble InterContemporain, founded in 1976
- Ensemble La Fenice, founded in 1990
- Ensemble Matheus, founded in 1991
- Les Musiciens du Louvre (Grenoble), founded in 1982
- Orchestre de la Société des Concerts du Conservatoire, founded in 1828, disbanded 1967
- Orchestre de Paris, founded in 1967
- Orchestre des Champs-Élysées (Poitiers), founded in 1991
- Orchestre Français des Jeunes (national youth orchestra)
- Orchestre National Bordeaux Aquitaine, founded in 1974
- Orchestre National d'Île-de-France, founded in 1974
- Orchestre National de France, founded in 1934
- Orchestre National de Lille, founded in 1976
- Orchestre National de Lyon, founded in 1905
- Orchestre National des Pays de la Loire, founded in 1971
- Orchestre national du Capitole de Toulouse, founded c.1932
- Orchestra of the National Opera of Lorraine (Nancy), founded in 1884
- Orchestre des Pays de Savoie, founded in 1984
- Orchestre Philharmonique de Radio France, 1937
- Orchestre philharmonique de Strasbourg, founded in 1855
- Orchestre symphonique de Mulhouse, founded in 1975
- Opéra Orchestre national Montpellier, founded in 2001
- Rouen Philharmonic Orchestra, founded in 1998

== Germany ==
- National youth orchestras:
  - Bundesjugendorchester
  - Junge Deutsche Philharmonie

=== A–M ===
- Akademie für Alte Musik Berlin
- Akademische Orchestervereinigung
- Badische Staatskapelle
- Bamberg Symphony Orchestra (Bamberger Symphoniker)
- Bavarian Radio Symphony Orchestra (Symphonieorchester des Bayerischen Rundfunks)
- Bavarian State Orchestra (Bayerisches Staatsorchester)
- Bayreuth Festival Orchestra
- Berlin Philharmonic (Berliner Philharmoniker)
- Berlin Radio Symphony Orchestra (East Berlin) (Rundfunk-Sinfonieorchester Berlin)
- Berliner Symphoniker
- Bochumer Symphoniker
- Detmold Chamber Orchestra
- Deutsche Kammerphilharmonie Bremen
- Deutsches Filmorchester Babelsberg
- Deutsche Radio Philharmonie Saarbrücken Kaiserslautern
- Deutsches Symphonie-Orchester Berlin
- Dortmunder Philharmoniker
- Dresden Philharmonic (Dresdner Philharmonie)
- Duisburg Philharmonic (Duisburger Philharmoniker)
- Frankfurter Opern- und Museumsorchester (Frankfurt Opera)
- Fulda Symphonic Orchestra (Fuldaer Symphonisches Orchester)
- Freiburger Barockorchester
- Gürzenich-Orchester Köln
- Hamburger Symphoniker
- Hannoversche Hofkapelle
- Hofer Symphoniker
- hr-Sinfonieorchester
- Jenaer Philharmonie
- Klassische Philharmonie Bonn
- Konzerthausorchester Berlin (formerly Berlin Symphony Orchestra)
- Leipzig Gewandhaus Orchestra (Gewandhausorchester Leipzig)
- Mahler Chamber Orchestra
- MDR Symphony Orchestra
- Mecklenburgische Staatskapelle
- Münchner Rundfunkorchester
- Munich Philharmonic (Münchner Philharmoniker)

=== N–Z ===
- NDR Radiophilharmonie (Hannover)
- NDR Elbphilharmonie Orchestra (Hamburg Elbphilharmonie)
- Neue Philharmonie Frankfurt (Offenbach am Main)
- Neue Philharmonie Westfalen
- Niedersächsisches Staatsorchester Hannover
- Norddeutsche Philharmonie Rostock
- Nordwestdeutsche Philharmonie
- Nuremberg Symphony (Nürnberger Symphoniker)
- Philharmonia Hungarica, founded by Hungarian exiles, disbanded 2001
- Philharmonie Festiva
- Philharmonisches Staatsorchester Hamburg
- Philharmonisches Kammerorchester Berlin
- Philharmonisches Staatsorchester Mainz
- Reuss Chamber Orchestra
- Southwest German Radio Symphony Orchestra
- Staatskapelle Berlin
- Staatskapelle Dresden (Sächsische Staatskapelle Dresden)
- Staatskapelle Halle
- Staatskapelle Weimar
- Staatsorchester Braunschweig (State Orchestra Brunswik)
- Staatsorchester Stuttgart
- Stuttgart Chamber Orchestra
- Stuttgart Radio Symphony Orchestra
- SWR Symphonieorchester
- Sinfonie Orchester Schöneberg
- WDR Rundfunkorchester Köln
- WDR Symphony Orchestra Cologne
- Württembergisches Kammerorchester Heilbronn

== Greece ==
- Greek Youth Symphony Orchestra (national youth orchestra)
- Philharmonic Society of Corfu (Orchestra)

== Hungary ==
- Budapest Festival Orchestra
- Budapest Philharmonic Orchestra
- Hungarian Radio Symphony Orchestra, also known earlier as Budapest Symphony Orchestra
- Hungarian National Philharmonic
- Philharmonia Hungarica, founded by Hungarian exiles, based in Germany; dissolved in 2001
- Szeged Symphony Orchestra

== Iceland ==
- Iceland Symphony Orchestra (Sinfóníuhljómsveit Íslands)

== Ireland ==
- National Symphony Orchestra (Ireland)
- RTÉ Concert Orchestra
- Irish Chamber Orchestra
- Hibernian Orchestra
- Camerata Ireland
- Dublin Philharmonic Orchestra
- Dublin Orchestral Players
- University College Dublin Symphony Orchestra
- Trinity College Orchestra
- National Youth Orchestra of Ireland (national youth orchestra)
- Dublin Youth Orchestra (youth orchestra)
- Cork Youth Orchestra (youth orchestra)
- Galway Youth Orchestra (youth orchestra)
- Mayo Youth Orchestra (youth orchestra)
- Kilkenny Youth Orchestra (youth orchestra)
- Roscommon County Youth Orchestra (youth orchestra)
- Carlow Youth Orchestra (youth orchestra)
- Athlone Youth Orchestra (youth orchestra)
- Young Dublin Symphonia (youth orchestra)
- ConCorda Chamber Ensemble (youth orchestra)
- Coole Music Youth Orchestra (youth orchestra)

== Italy ==
- Accademia Filarmonica Romana, Rome
- Camerata de' Bardi, academic orchestra, Pavia
- I Musici, Rome
- I Solisti Veneti, Padua
- Orchestra del Maggio Musicale Fiorentino, Florence
- Orchestra dell'Accademia Nazionale di Santa Cecilia, Rome
- Orchestra di Piazza Vittorio
- Orchestra Filarmonica della Fenice, Venice
- Orchestra Giovanile Italiana (national youth orchestra)
- Orchestra i Pomeriggi Musicali, Milan
- Orchestra Sinfonica di Milano Giuseppe Verdi, Milan
- Orchestra Sinfonica Nazionale della RAI, Turin
- Orchestra Mozart, founded by Claudio Abbado in Bologna
- Orchestra Roma Sinfonietta, directed by Ennio Morricone
- Orchestra Sinfonica di Roma, Rome
- RCA Italiana Orchestra
- Rondò Veneziano, Venice
- Teatro San Carlo Orchestra, Naples
- Teatro Carlo Felice Orchestra, Genova
- Teatro dell'Opera di Roma Orchestra, Rome
- Teatro Petruzzelli Orchestra, Bari
- Teatro Comunale di Bologna Orchestra, Bologna
- Venice Baroque Orchestra

== Latvia ==
- Latvian National Symphony Orchestra
- Liepaja Symphony Orchestra

== Lithuania ==
- Klaipėda Chamber Orchestra
- Lithuanian National Symphony Orchestra
- Lithuanian State Symphony Orchestra
- Lithuanian Chamber Orchestra

== Luxembourg ==
- Luxembourg Philharmonic Orchestra
- Luxembourg Sinfonietta

== Malta ==
- Malta Philharmonic Orchestra

== Moldova ==
- Moldovan National Youth Orchestra (national youth orchestra)

== Monaco ==
- Monte-Carlo Philharmonic Orchestra

== Montenegro ==
- Montenegrin Symphony Orchestra

• Gradska Muzika Kotor 1842

== The Netherlands ==
- National Youth Orchestra of the Netherlands (national youth orchestra)
- Holland Symfonia
- Metropole Orchestra
- Netherlands Philharmonic Orchestra
- Netherlands Radio Philharmonic
- Netherlands Chamber Orchestra
- Netherlands Radio Symphony Orchestra
- Netherlands Symphony Orchestra
- North Netherlands Symphony Orchestra
- Orchestra of the Eighteenth Century
- Residentie Orchestra
- Rotterdam Philharmonic Orchestra
- Royal Concertgebouw Orchestra
- Symfonisch Blaasorkest ATH

== Norway ==
- Ungdomssymfonikerne (national youth orchestra)
- Norwegian Arctic Philharmonic Orchestra
- Bergen Philharmonic Orchestra
- Kristiansand Symphony Orchestra
- Norwegian Chamber Orchestra
- Norwegian Radio Orchestra
- Oslo Philharmonic Orchestra
- Oslo Sinfonietta
- Stavanger Symphony Orchestra
- Trondheim Symphony Orchestra

== Poland ==
- Polish Sinfonia Iuventus Orchestra (national youth orchestra)
- Pomeranian Philharmonic (Bydgoszcz)
- Kraków Philharmonic Orchestra (Kraków)
- Łódź Philharmonic (Łódź)
- Polish National Radio Symphony Orchestra (Katowice)
- Polish Radio Symphony Orchestra (Warsaw)
- Polish Baltic Philharmonic (Gdańsk)
- Poznań Philharmonic (Poznań)
- National Forum of Music Symphony Orchestra (Wrocław)
- Silesian Philharmonic (Katowice)
- Sinfonia Varsovia (Warsaw)
- Sudecka Philharmonic (Wałbrzych)
- Warsaw Philharmonic Orchestra (Warsaw)
- Szczecin Philharmonic (Szczecin)
- Women's Orchestra of Auschwitz, youth orchestra at concentration camp (historic)

== Portugal ==
- Gulbenkian Orchestra
- Portuguese Chamber Orchestra

== Romania ==
- Banatul Philharmonic Orchestra (Timișoara)
- Brasov Philharmonic (Brașov)
- Bucharest Symphony Orchestra
- George Enescu Philharmonic Orchestra (Bucharest)
- Moldova Philharmonic Orchestra (Iași)
- National Radio Orchestra (Bucharest)
- Oltenia Philharmonic Orchestra (Craiova)
- Paul Constantinescu Philharmonic Orchestra (Ploiești)
- Romanian Youth Orchestra (national youth orchestra)
- Sibiu Philharmonic Orchestra
- Transylvania State Philharmonic Orchestra (Cluj-Napoca)

== Russia ==
- Mariinsky Theatre Orchestra
- Moscow Chamber Orchestra
- Moscow City Symphony Orchestra
- Moscow Philharmonic Orchestra
- Moscow State Symphony Orchestra
- Moscow Symphony Orchestra
- Moscow Virtuosi
- Murmansk Philharmonic Orchestra
- National Philharmonic of Russia
- Novosibirsk Youth Symphony Orchestra
- Osipov State Russian Folk Orchestra
- Persimfans
- Russian National Orchestra
- Russian Philharmonic Orchestra
- Sochi Symphony Orchestra
- Saint Petersburg Academic Symphony Orchestra
- Saint Petersburg Philharmonic Orchestra
- State Academic Symphony Orchestra of the Russian Federation
- State Symphony Capella of Russia
- State Symphony Cinema Orchestra
- Tchaikovsky Symphony Orchestra
- Ural Philharmonic Orchestra

== Serbia ==
- Belgrade Philharmonic Orchestra
- Niš Symphony Orchestra

== Slovakia ==
- Cappella Istropolitana
- Slovak Philharmonic
- Slovak Radio Symphony Orchestra
- Slovak Youth Orchestra (national youth orchestra)
- Slovak Chamber Orchestra

== Slovenia ==
- RTV Slovenia Symphony Orchestra
- Slovenian Philharmonic Orchestra

== Spain ==
- Bilbao Orkestra Sinfonikoa
- Castile and León Symphony Orchestra
- Chamartín Symphony Orchestra
- Community of Madrid Orchestra
- Málaga Philharmonic
- Madrid Academic Orchestra
- Madrid Symphony Orchestra
- Orquesta Ciudad de Granada
- Orquesta Clásica Santa Cecilia
- Orquestra de Cadaqués
- Orquesta Filarmónica de Málaga
- Orquestra Simfònica de Barcelona i Nacional de Catalunya
- Orquesta Sinfónica de Burgos
- Orquesta Sinfónica de Galicia
- Orquesta Sinfónica de las Islas Baleares
- Orquesta Sinfonica de Tenerife
- Orquestra Simfònica del Gran Teatre del Liceu
- Orquestra Simfònica del Vallès
- Queen Sofía Chamber Orchestra
- Real Compañía Ópera de Cámara
- Real Orquesta Sinfónica de Sevilla
- RTVE Symphony Orchestra (based in Madrid)
- Sociedad de Conciertos de Madrid
- Spanish National Youth Orchestra (national youth orchestra)
- Orquesta Nacional de España (based in Madrid)
- Valencian Community Orchestra
- Valencia Orchestra

== Sweden ==
- Gävle Symphony Orchestra
- Gothenburg Symphony Orchestra
- Helsingborg Symphony Orchestra
- Kungliga Hovkapellet
- Malmö Symphony Orchestra
- Norrköping Symphony Orchestra
- Örebro Chamber Orchestra
- Royal Academic Orchestra
- Royal Stockholm Philharmonic Orchestra
- Stockholm Youth Symphony Orchestra
- Swedish Chamber Orchestra
- Swedish Radio Symphony Orchestra

== Switzerland ==
- Basel Sinfonietta
- Berner Symphonie-Orchester
- Biel Solothurn Symphony Orchestra
- Camerata Bern
- Kammerorchester Basel
- Lucerne Festival Strings
- Luzerner Sinfonieorchester
- Orchester Musikkollegium Winterthur
- Orchestra della Svizzera Italiana
- Orchestre de Chambre de Lausanne
- Orchestre de chambre de Neuchâtel
- Orchestre de la Suisse Romande
- Sinfonieorchester Basel
- Tonhalle Orchester Zurich
- Zurich Chamber Orchestra
- Zurich Opera House Orchestra
- Zurich Symphony Orchestra

== Turkey ==
- Antalya State Symphony Orchestra
- Barış Youth Symphony Orchestra
- Bilkent Symphony Orchestra
- Borusan Istanbul Philharmonic Orchestra
- Bursa State Symphony Orchestra
- Cukurova State Symphony Orchestra
- Istanbul State Symphony Orchestra
- Izmir State Symphony Orchestra*
- Turkish Presidential Symphony Orchestra

== Ukraine ==
- Ukrainian Radio Symphony Orchestra
- National Symphony Orchestra of Ukraine
- Symphony Orchestra of the National Philharmonic of Ukraine
- Kyiv Symphony Orchestra
- Kyiv Classic Orchestra
- Academic Symphony Orchestra of the Lviv Philharmonic

== United Kingdom ==
=== England ===
- Academy of Ancient Music
- Academy of St Martin in the Fields
- BBC Concert Orchestra
- BBC Philharmonic
- BBC Symphony Orchestra
- Bournemouth Sinfonietta
- Bournemouth Symphony Orchestra
- Britten Sinfonia
- Camerata of London
- City of Birmingham Symphony Orchestra
- City of London Sinfonia
- Docklands Sinfonia
- English Baroque Soloists
- English Chamber Orchestra
- English Concert
- Hallé Orchestra
- Huddersfield Philharmonic Orchestra
- Hull Philharmonic Orchestra
- Kensington Symphony Orchestra
- Kings Chamber Orchestra
- Leeds Symphony Orchestra
- Leicester Symphony Orchestra
- London Chamber Orchestra
- London Classical Players
- London Festival Orchestra
- London Mozart Players
- London Philharmonic Orchestra
- London Shostakovich Orchestra
- London Sinfonietta
- London Symphony Orchestra
- Manchester Camerata
- National Youth Orchestra of Great Britain
- New London Orchestra
- Northern Sinfonia
- Orchestra of Opera North
- Orchestra of the Age of Enlightenment
- Orchestra of the City
- Oxford Philharmonic Orchestra
- Philharmonia
- Royal Liverpool Philharmonic Orchestra
- Royal Philharmonic Orchestra
- Sheffield Symphony Orchestra
- Sinfonia ViVA
- Sunderland Symphony Orchestra
- The King's Consort
- Worthing Symphony Orchestra
- Yorkshire Symphony Orchestra

=== Northern Ireland ===
- Ulster Orchestra

=== Scotland ===
- BBC Scottish Radio Orchestra
- BBC Scottish Symphony Orchestra
- National Youth Orchestra of Scotland
- Royal Scottish National Orchestra
- Scottish Chamber Orchestra
- Scottish Ensemble
- Scottish Festival Orchestra

=== Wales ===
- BBC National Orchestra of Wales
- Cardiff Philharmonic Orchestra
- National Youth Orchestra of Wales
- Welsh Sinfonia
- Welsh Chamber Orchestra (founded in 1986)
