= Camerata (music) =

Small chamber orchestra or ensemble specializing in classical and instrumental music

A camerata is a small chamber orchestra or choir, with up to 40 to 60 musicians.

== Examples of music ensembles ==
- Camerata Vox Lumini, a chamber music ensemble from Talca, Chile
- Camerata Bariloche, a chamber music ensemble in Argentina
- Camerata Bern, a Swiss small and flexible chamber orchestra
- Camerata Chicago, an American chamber orchestra
- Camerata New York, an American chamber orchestra
- Camerata de' Bardi
- Camerata Ireland, a chamber orchestra
- Kyiv Camerata, a Ukrainian orchestra
- Camerata Klaipėda, a Lithuanian chamber orchestra
- Camerata Mediolanense, an ensemble of musicians established in Milano, Italy
- Camerata Mediterranea, a French nonprofit organization and an international, intercultural institute of musical exchanges
- Camerata of London, an English modern-instrument chamber orchestra
- Camerata Salzburg, an Austrian chamber orchestra
- Israel Camerata Jerusalem, an Israeli chamber orchestra
- Moscow Camerata, a Russian chamber orchestra
- Camerata Trajectina, a Dutch early music ensemble
- Boston Camerata, an American early music ensemble
- Halifax Camerata Singers, a Canadian chamber choir
- Manchester Camerata, a British chamber orchestra
- Oslo Camerata, a Norwegian mostly classical string orchestra
- Polish Chamber Orchestra Camerata-Wroclaw, a professional orchestra
- Prescott Camerata Chamber Singers, a chamber choir in Prescott, Arizona
- Skipton Building Society Camerata, an English professional chamber orchestra
- Toronto Camerata, a Canadian chamber orchestra
- Tuks Camerata, a choir at the University of Pretoria, South Africa
- Washington Men's Camerata
- Welsh Camerata
- Camerata de Lausanne
- Camerata New Jersey, a virtuosic classical music ensemble based in metropolitan NY area.
- Camerata Heroica, a chamber orchestra from Cartagena de Indias, Colombia.
