= Vorarlberger Landestheater =

Coordinates: 47°30′16″N 9°44′50″E

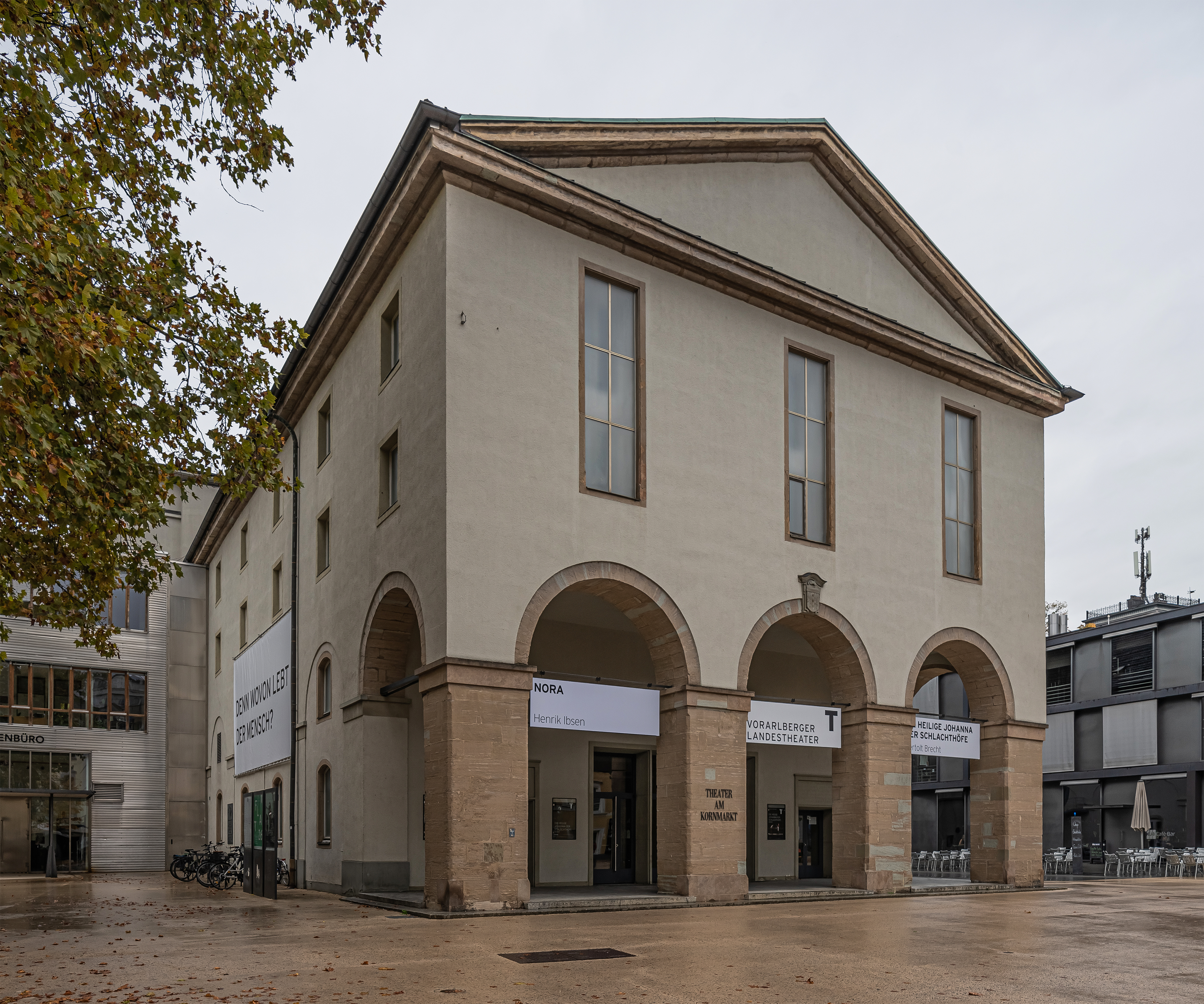
The exterior in 2022

Vorarlberger Landestheater is a theatre in Bregenz, Vorarlberg, western Austria. The theatre was established in 1945. Stephanie Gräve has been the manager since 2018. The theatre is due to close in the 2025/26 season for refurbishment.

== History ==
The theatre was founded in November 1945 and was initially a state enterprise. It was reopened as a private enterprise by Fritz Klingenbeck in November 1948.

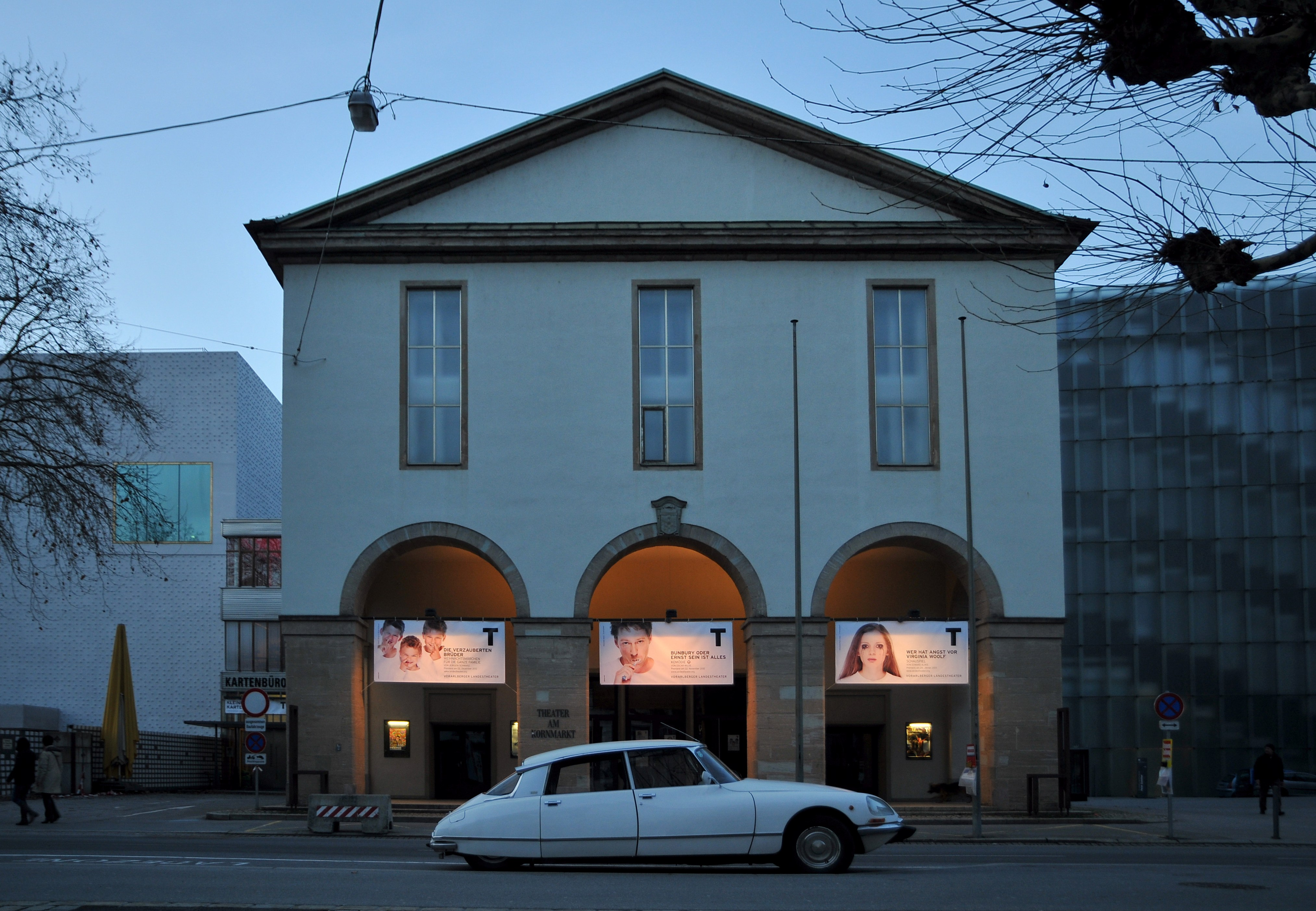
The theatre in 2012

The theatre building on Kornmarkt was under the management of the Bregenz Cultural Office until 2013. Since then, the building has been rented to the Landestheater by the city of Bregenz all year round.

In August 2018, Stephanie Gräve took over as manager of the theatre.

In July 2022, it was announced that a large part of the stage equipment and technology is to be renovated between the fall of 2025 and summer 2026. The theatre is to remain closed for the 2025/26 season due to the refurbishment. A total of around 7.5 million euros is to be invested in technical maintenance and a further two million euros in structural adjustments, such as opening up the foyer towards Karl-Tizian-Platz.

== Productions and staff ==
The theatre has around 45 employs and produces around 15 premieres a season, with varied repertoire throughout the year, including a Christmas play for families and an opera production in cooperation with the Vorarlberg Symphony Orchestra.

In 2014, the theatre put on a production of the play Das ist Esther under Dirk Diekmann.

== Intendants ==
- 1945–1948: Kurt Kaiser
- 1948–1955: Fritz Klingenbeck
- 1955–1966: Richard Wegeler
- 1966–1970: Alex Freihart
- 1970–1999: Bruno Felix
- 2000–2009: Harald Petermichl
- 2010–2017: Alexander Kubelka
- 2017–2018: Britta Kampert (interim)
- Since August 2018: Stephanie Gräve
