= Chamartín =

Chamartín may refer to:

- Chamartín, Ávila, a municipality in the province of Ávila, Castile and León, Spain
- Chamartín (Madrid), an administrative district in Madrid, Spain.
- Estadio Chamartín, a former multi-use stadium in Madrid, Spain.
- Madrid Chamartín railway station, the second major railway station in Madrid, Spain.
- Chamartín Symphony Orchestra, a symphony orchestra based in Madrid, Spain.
