= Karin Schäfer =

Austrian puppeteer and visual artist

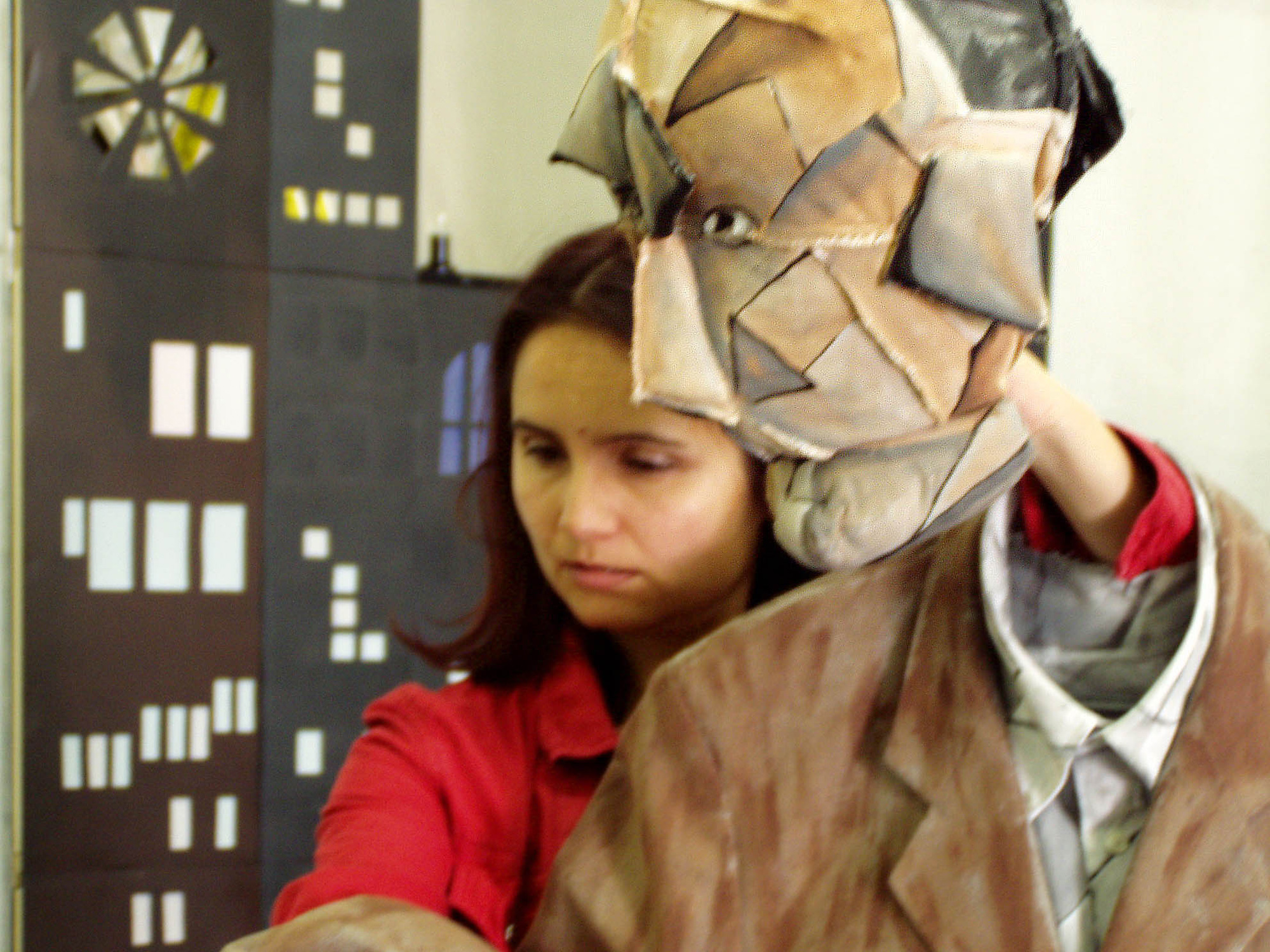
- Karin Schäfer (2005)
- Born: September 21, 1963 (age 62); Mödling, Austria
- Occupations: Puppeteer, theatre director, visual artist
- Years active: 1989–present
- Known for: "Visual Theatre" (Visuelles Theater); founder of PannOpticum festival
- Website: www.figurentheater.at

Karin Schäfer (born 21 September 1963) is an Austrian puppeteer, theatre director and visual artist. She is the founder and artistic director of the Karin Schäfer Figuren Theater – Visual Theatre Productions, a Vienna-based company that has toured in more than 45 countries. Building on techniques of classical marionette and puppetry, she developed a form of staging she calls "Visual Theatre" (Visuelles Theater), which combines puppetry with dance, live music, masks, animation and projection and largely dispenses with spoken text. Since 2003 she has also been the founder and artistic director of PannOpticum, a biennial international puppet theatre festival in Neusiedl am See, Austria.

== Early life and training ==
Schäfer was born in Mödling and grew up in Vienna and in Neusiedl am See, in the Austrian state of Burgenland. After completing secondary school in Vienna, where she also studied art history, German studies and Spanish, she moved to Barcelona, Spain, in 1987 to train in marionette construction and performance under Harry V. Tozer at the city's Institut del Teatre. She remained in Spain for several years, working with several ensembles before returning to Austria in 1993.

== Career ==
=== Spain and early work (1989–1993) ===
In 1989, together with the Catalan puppeteer Santi Arnal, Schäfer founded the puppet theatre company Per Poc in Barcelona; their first joint production was Piccolo Forte Pianissimo. The company toured Spain, France, Germany and Belgium until 1993. Between 1991 and 1993 she also collaborated with the Catalan puppeteer Jordi Bertran on Poemas Visuales (1992), which toured France and Spain and received the jury prize at the Cannes International Theatre Festival in 1994.

=== Return to Austria and "Visual Theatre" (1993–2002) ===
Schäfer returned to Vienna in 1993 where she created and directed Über das Marionettentheater ("On the Marionette Theatre"), a puppetry and dance piece based on the essay by Heinrich von Kleist. The production was subsequently invited to festivals in Austria, Germany, France, Greece, Italy and the former Yugoslavia and Czechoslovakia, as well as to the International Festival of Experimental Theatre in Cairo. In the same period, in cooperation with the children's theatre company Schneck + Co, she designed and built the marionettes for Post für den Tiger, based on the picture book by Janosch, which toured Austria and was featured on ORF television.

In 1997 she premiered the solo piece Stringtime at the dietheater in the Vienna Konzerthaus; the production toured internationally until 2007, including performances in Russia, South Korea, Cuba, Pakistan and Mexico, and in 2003 received the "Premio Villanueva" for best foreign production at the Festival Internacional de Teatro de La Habana in Cuba. Schäfer won first prize at the First International Festival of Solo Puppeteers in Łódź, Poland, in 1999, and was named best performer at the same festival in 2003.

In 2001 she staged Peter and the Wolf at the Vienna Konzerthaus with the Wiener Kammerphilharmonie, conducted by Claudius Traunfellner, in a co-production with the Barcelona company Per Poc. In 2002 she created home@anywhere, a piece for young audiences about the lives of adolescents in Pakistan, developed from research trips to Lahore and the Thar Desert.

=== PannOpticum and visual concerts (2003–2017) ===
In 2003 Schäfer founded PannOpticum, an international festival of visual theatre held every two years in Neusiedl am See, of which she has remained artistic director. A central strand of her work since then has combined puppetry and projected imagery with live classical music. Bilder einer Ausstellung ("Pictures at an Exhibition"), created in 2005 with the pianist Christopher Hinterhuber and set to the music of Modest Mussorgsky, premiered at the Vienna Konzerthaus and was subsequently performed at the Museum der Moderne Salzburg and the Philharmonie Luxembourg, and later in an orchestral version with the Izmir State Symphony Orchestra in Turkey.

In 2010 her production Zheng He – als die Drachenschiffe kamen, about the Chinese admiral Zheng He, premiered at Dschungel Wien in the MuseumsQuartier; it went on to be performed more than 100 times in some 20 countries. The production won the 2011 STELLA award, the Austrian prize for children's and youth theatre, in the category of outstanding stage design. Schäfer was a prizewinner of the Burgenland-Stiftung Theodor Kery, the Austrian state of Burgenland's cultural foundation, in 2010 for her work on PannOpticum.

In 2015 she created IBERIA, a "visual concert" inspired by the piano cycle of the same name by Isaac Albéniz, first performed with the Orquesta Sinfónica de Castilla y León at the Auditorio Miguel Delibes in Valladolid, Spain. A 2021 review of the production in the Oberösterreichische Nachrichten described Schäfer as having "perfected" the genre, "creating a kaleidoscope of various forms of representation and techniques that merge into a fantastic work of art." IBERIA was also a finalist for "best large ensemble" at the YAM Awards in 2018, an international award for theatre for young audiences, among more than 60 entries from 27 countries.

In 2017–2018, working from the imagery of Pablo Picasso, Jean Cocteau and Erik Satie, Schäfer created Parade, a production combining visual theatre with urban dance, developed with the choreographer Valentin Alfery.

=== Recent work and visual art (2018–present) ===
From around 2017 Schäfer also began working as a collage artist under the name "SEAmaps", creating large-format collage works based on nautical charts and maps, which she exhibits and sells through her own studio.

In 2024 her production Crazy Old Me, a solo piece reflecting on ageing as a performer and puppeteer, premiered as part of PannOpticum. Coverage of the 2024 edition of PannOpticum appeared in Der Standard.

== Critical reception ==
Reviewing a 2004 performance of Es war zweimal ("Twice Upon a Time") at the Lambert Puppet Theatre in Dublin, The Irish Times critic Gerry Colgan described the production as "puppetry of a very high order", praising its mix of "almost Beckettian dialogue and visual creations verging on the hypnotic" as "masterly". A 2018 profile in the Wiener Zeitung described Schäfer's puppets, objects and stage forms as becoming "lively, memorable and ambiguous images" in productions where live music forms "an equal counterpart" to the visual action.

== Personal life ==
Schäfer lives with her partner, who is also her manager, in Neusiedl am See, Burgenland, and in Vienna.

== Awards and honours ==
- 1994 – Jury Prize, Festival International de la Performance d'Acteur, Cannes (with Santi Arnal and Jordi Bertran), for Poemas Visuales
- 1999 – First Prize, First International Festival of Solo Puppeteers, Łódź, Poland
- 2003 – Best Performer, First International Festival of Solo Puppeteers, Łódź, Poland
- 2003 – Premio Villanueva (best foreign production), Festival Internacional de Teatro de La Habana, Cuba, for Stringtime
- 2009 – Prizewinner, Dr.-Lorenz-Karall-Stiftung, Burgenland
- 2010 – Prizewinner, Burgenland-Stiftung Theodor Kery, for PannOpticum
- 2011 – STELLA award (outstanding stage/visual design), for Zheng He – als die Drachenschiffe kamen

== Selected productions ==
- Piccolo Forte Pianissimo (1989, with Per Poc)
- Poemas Visuales (1992, with Jordi Bertran and Santi Arnal)
- Über das Marionettentheater (1993)
- Post für den Tiger (1993–94)
- Stringtime (1997)
- Peter and the Wolf (2001)
- home@anywhere (2002)
- Da ist der Wurm drin (2004)
- Skywalker (2005)
- Bilder einer Ausstellung / Pictures at an Exhibition (2005)
- Wind und weiter (2006; re-staged 2008)
- Zheng He – als die Drachenschiffe kamen (2010)
- IBERIA (2015)
- Parade (2018)
- Crazy Old Me (2024)
