= Kirill Petrenko =

Russian-Austrian conductor (born 1972)

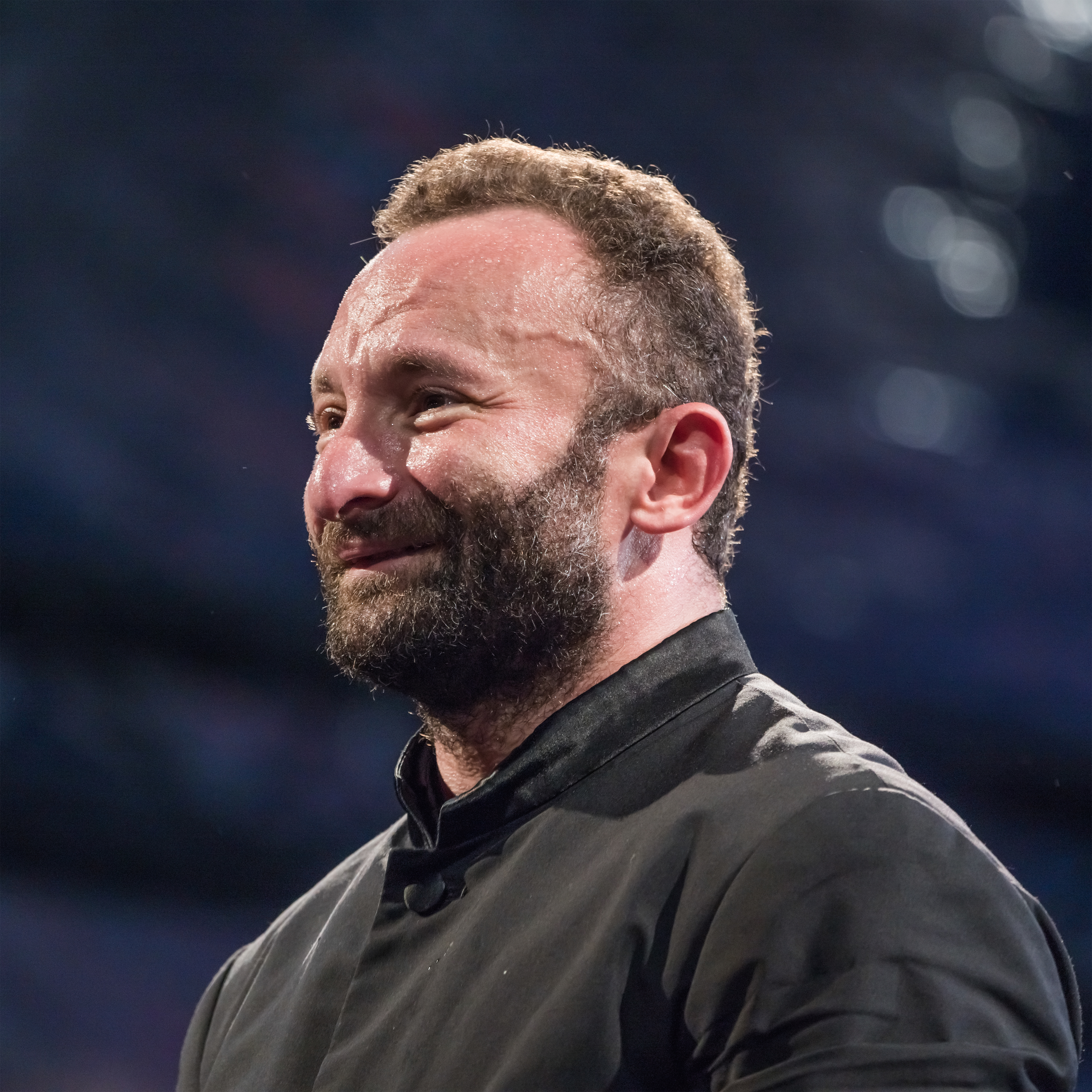
- Petrenko at Berlin Philharmonic, August 2019
- Born: Kirill Garrievich Petrenko; 11 February 1972 (age 54); Omsk, USSR
- Occupation: Conductor

Kirill Garrievich Petrenko (Russian: Кирилл Гарриевич Петренко, Latin script: Kirill Garrievič Petrenko; born 11 February 1972) is a Russian-Austrian conductor. He is chief conductor of the Berlin Philharmonic.

== Early life ==
Petrenko was born in Omsk, then in the Russian Soviet Federative Socialist Republic of the Soviet Union, to a violinist father and musicologist mother. He is of Jewish heritage but grew up with little religion. His father was born in Lviv, now in Ukraine. Petrenko studied piano, debuting at age 11.

At 18, when Soviet borders opened, he and his family emigrated to Austria, where his father joined the Symphony Orchestra Vorarlberg. Petrenko studied music at the Vorarlberger Landeskonservatorium in Feldkirch, Vorarlberg, graduating with honors in piano. He continued his studies at the University of Music and Performing Arts, Vienna, including with conductor Uroš Lajovic. His other conducting teachers and mentors include Myung-Whun Chung, Edward Downes, Péter Eötvös, Ferdinand Leitner, Roberto Carnevale, and Semyon Bychkov.

== Career ==
=== 1995–2002: Early career ===
Petrenko made his conducting debut in 1995 in Vorarlberg with Benjamin Britten's Let's Make an Opera. He was a Kapellmeister at the Vienna Volksoper from 1997 to 1999. From 1999 to 2002, he was Generalmusikdirektor (GMD) of the Südthüringisches Staatstheater, based at the Meiningen Court Theatre, where his work included conducting Richard Wagner's opera cycle Der Ring des Nibelungen in 2001 over four consecutive days, his first professional engagement with Wagner's operas.

=== 2002–2015: Komische Oper Berlin and Bavarian State Opera ===
Petrenko was GMD of the Komische Oper Berlin from 2002 to 2007. He debuted with the Bavarian State Opera in 2003 and returned in 2009 for a production of Leoš Janáček's Jenůfa. In October 2010, he was appointed the Bavarian State Opera's next GMD, to start in 2013.

He first guest-conducted the Berlin Philharmonic in 2006, and again in 2009 and 2012. A planned 2014 appearance was canceled due to injury. From 2013 to 2015, he conducted Wagner's Ring Cycle at the Bayreuth Festival. Petrenko called for Ukraine's sovereignty to be respected during the 2014 annexation of Crimea by the Russian Federation.

=== Since 2015: Berlin Philharmonic and Bavarian State Opera Leadership ===
In June 2015, the Berlin Philharmonic elected Petrenko as its next chief conductor, his first symphony orchestra chief role outside opera, with an anticipated start date after 2018. That October, his Bavarian State Opera contract, originally through 2018, was extended through 2021, albeit as guest conductor in the final season. That same month, the Berlin Philharmonic announced he would formally begin as chief conductor in the 2019–2020 season, with guest appearances beforehand. His official tenure start was confirmed for 19 August 2019.

In March 2020, Petrenko and Monika Grütters, as Federal Government Commissioner for Culture and the Media in Germany, assumed patronage of the Musiker-Nothilfe, supporting freelance musicians affected by the COVID-19 pandemic. He condemned the 2022 Russian invasion of Ukraine as a "knife in the back of the entire peaceful world" that February.

He has championed Arnold Schoenberg's music with the Berlin Philharmonic, including Verklärte Nacht, the Chamber Symphony No. 1, and the first recording in over 20 years of the oratorio fragment Die Jakobsleiter, released in 2025 as part of a set.

== Gallery ==
Petrenko conducting a concert of the Berlin Philharmonic in August 2019.

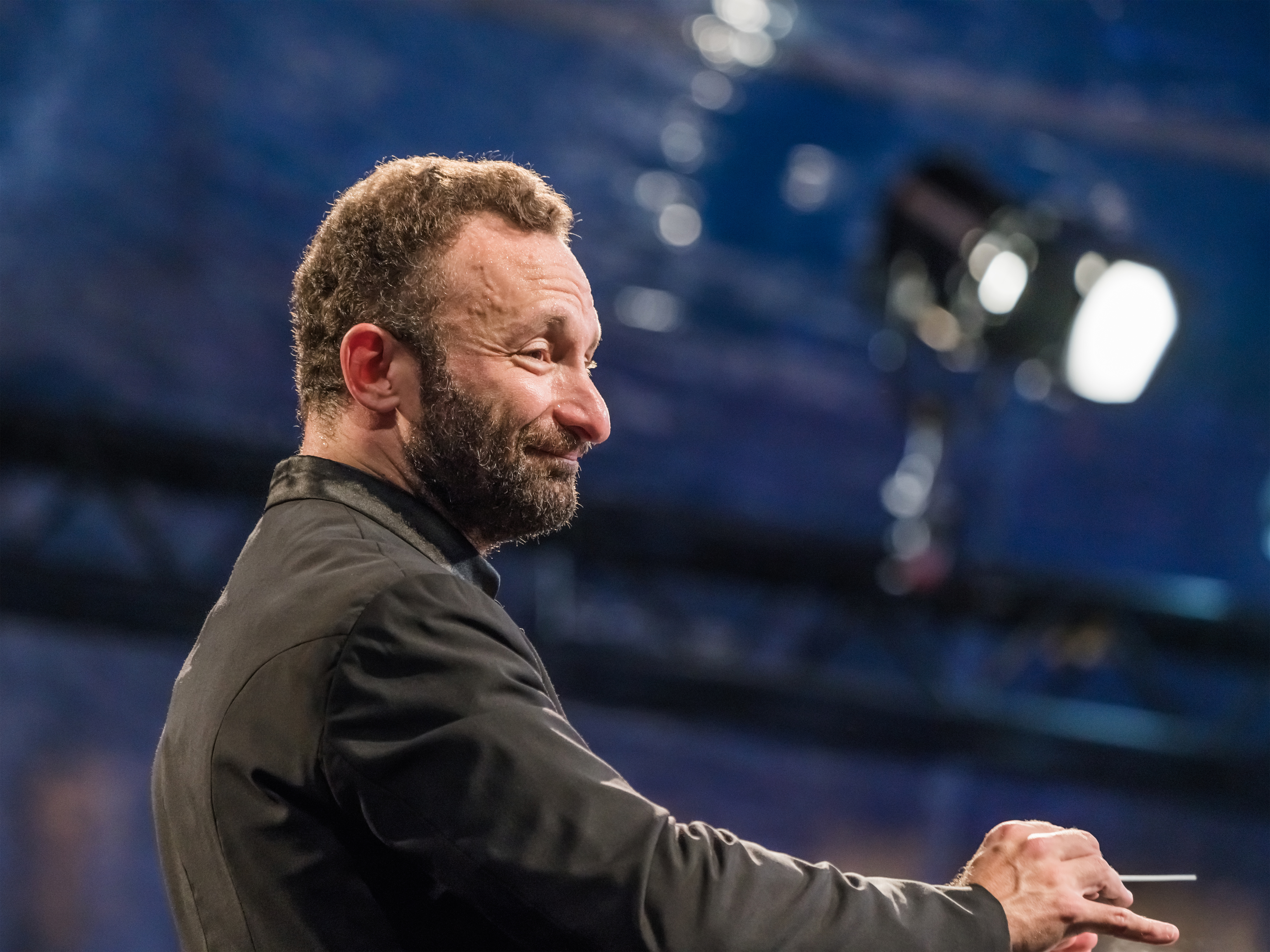

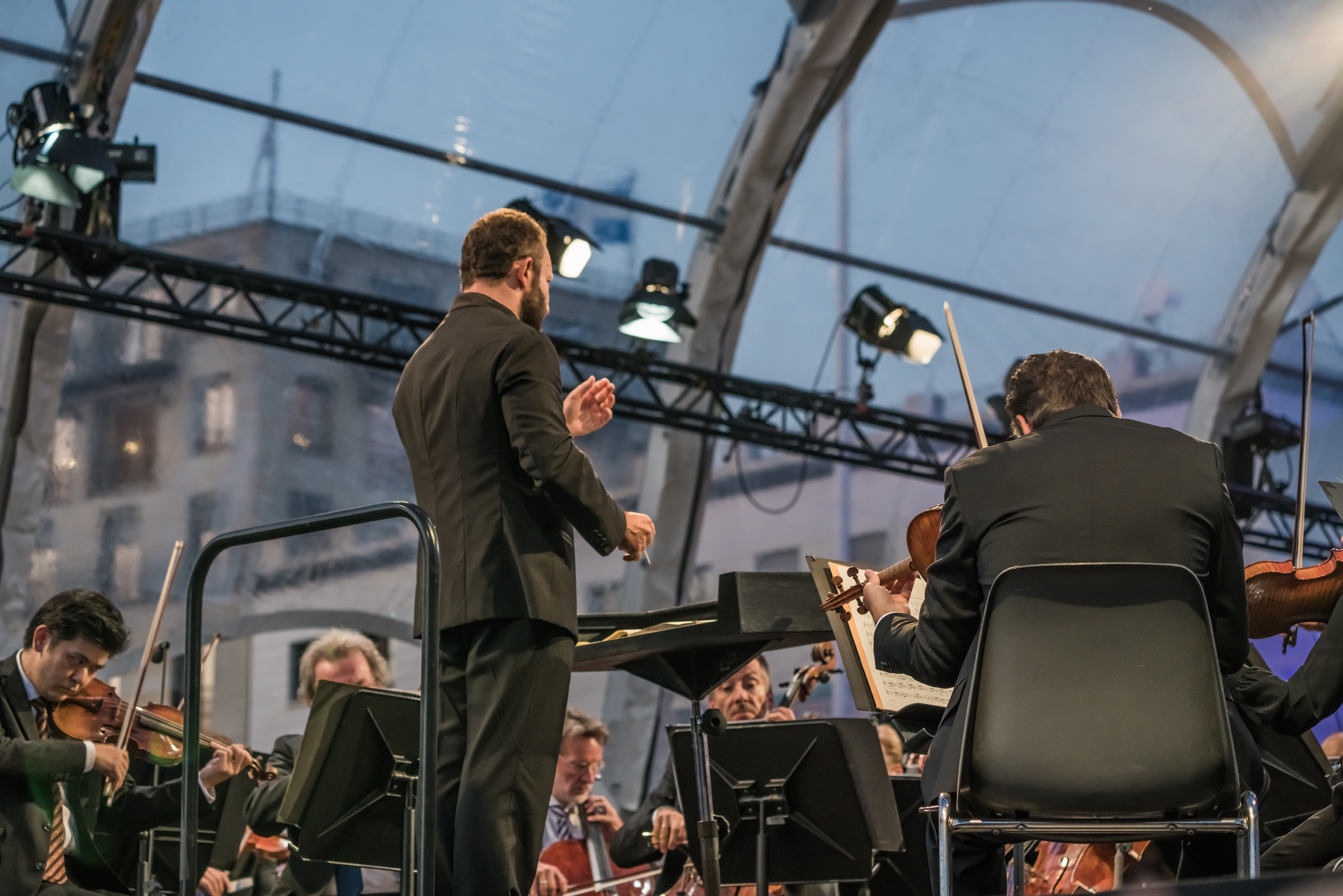

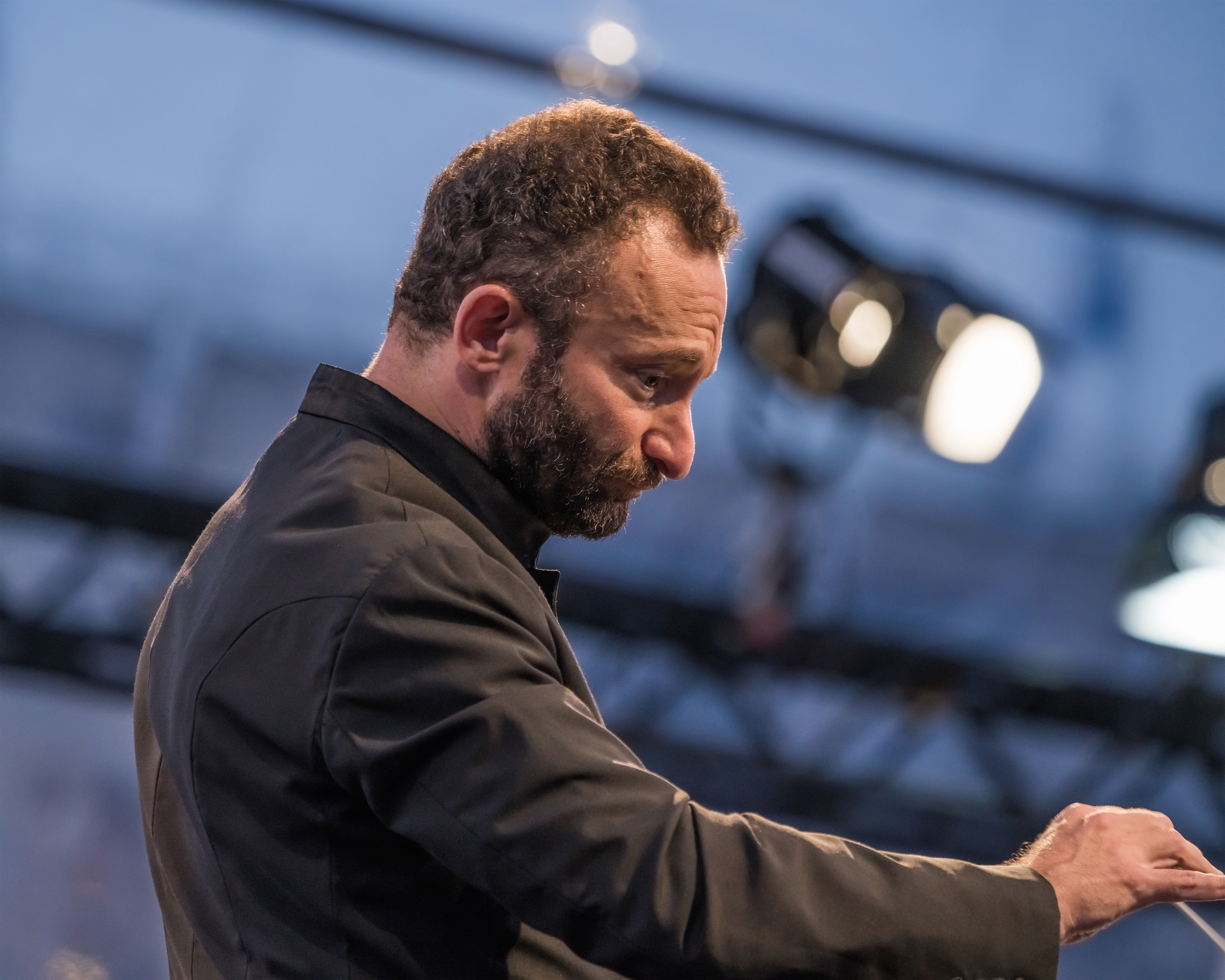

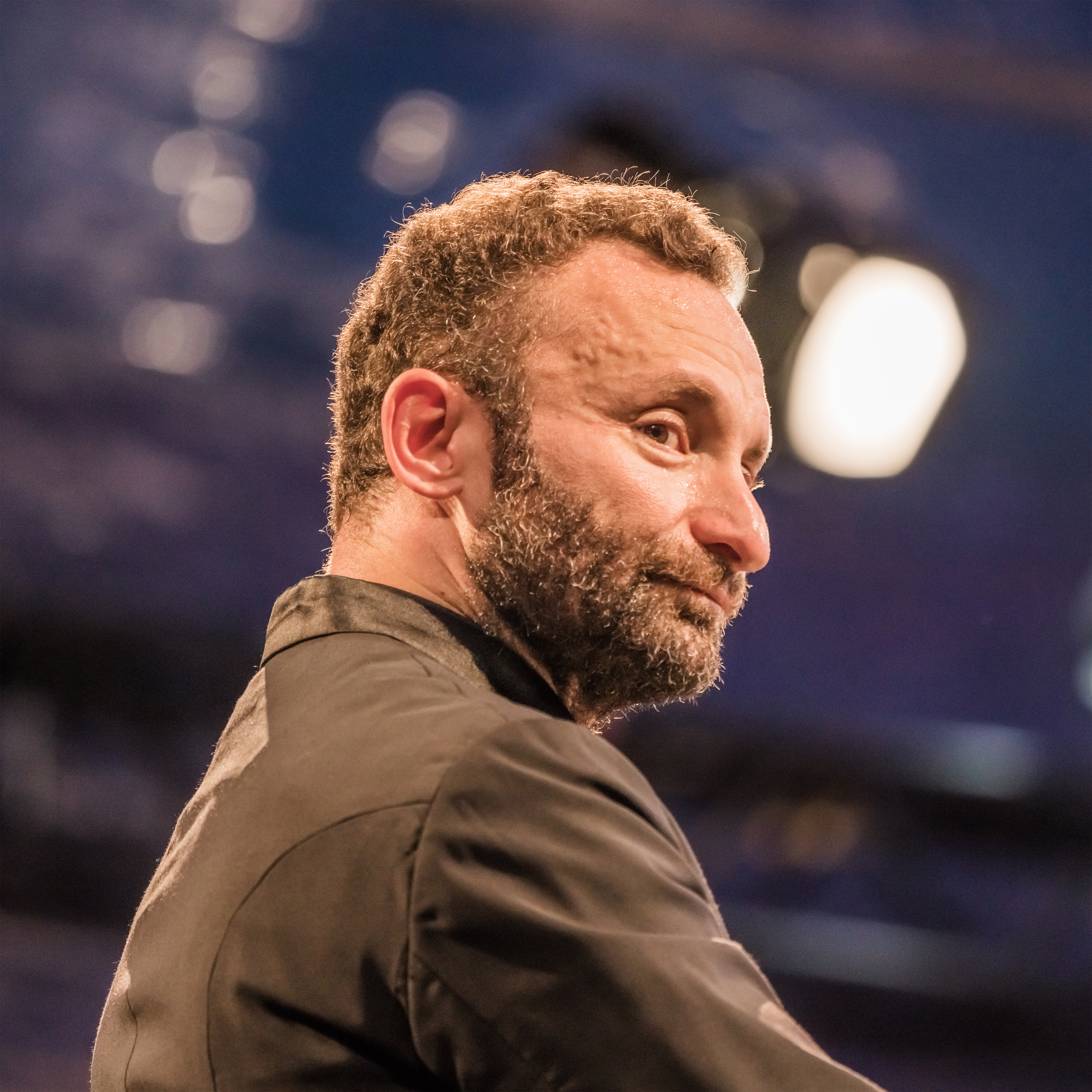

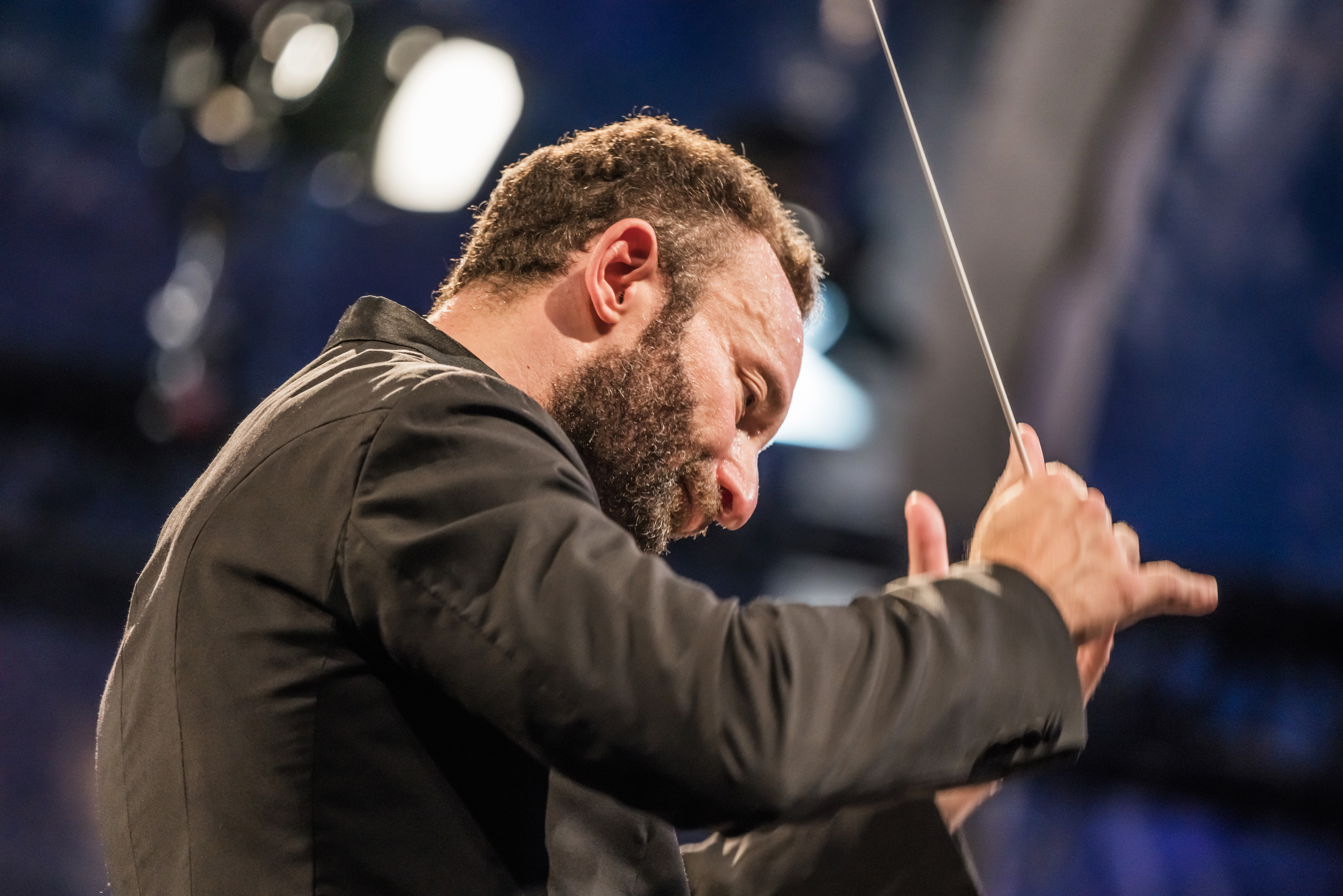

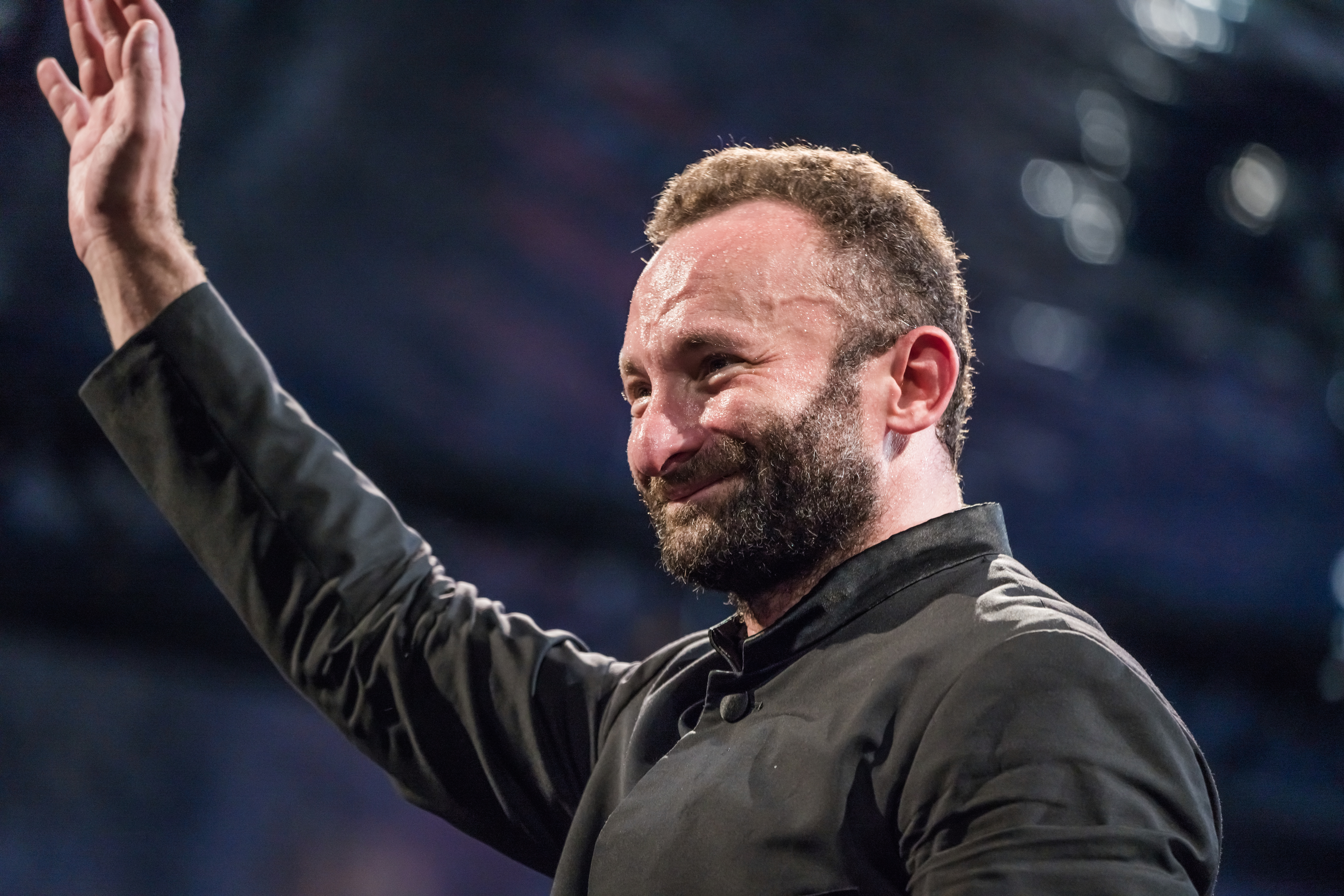

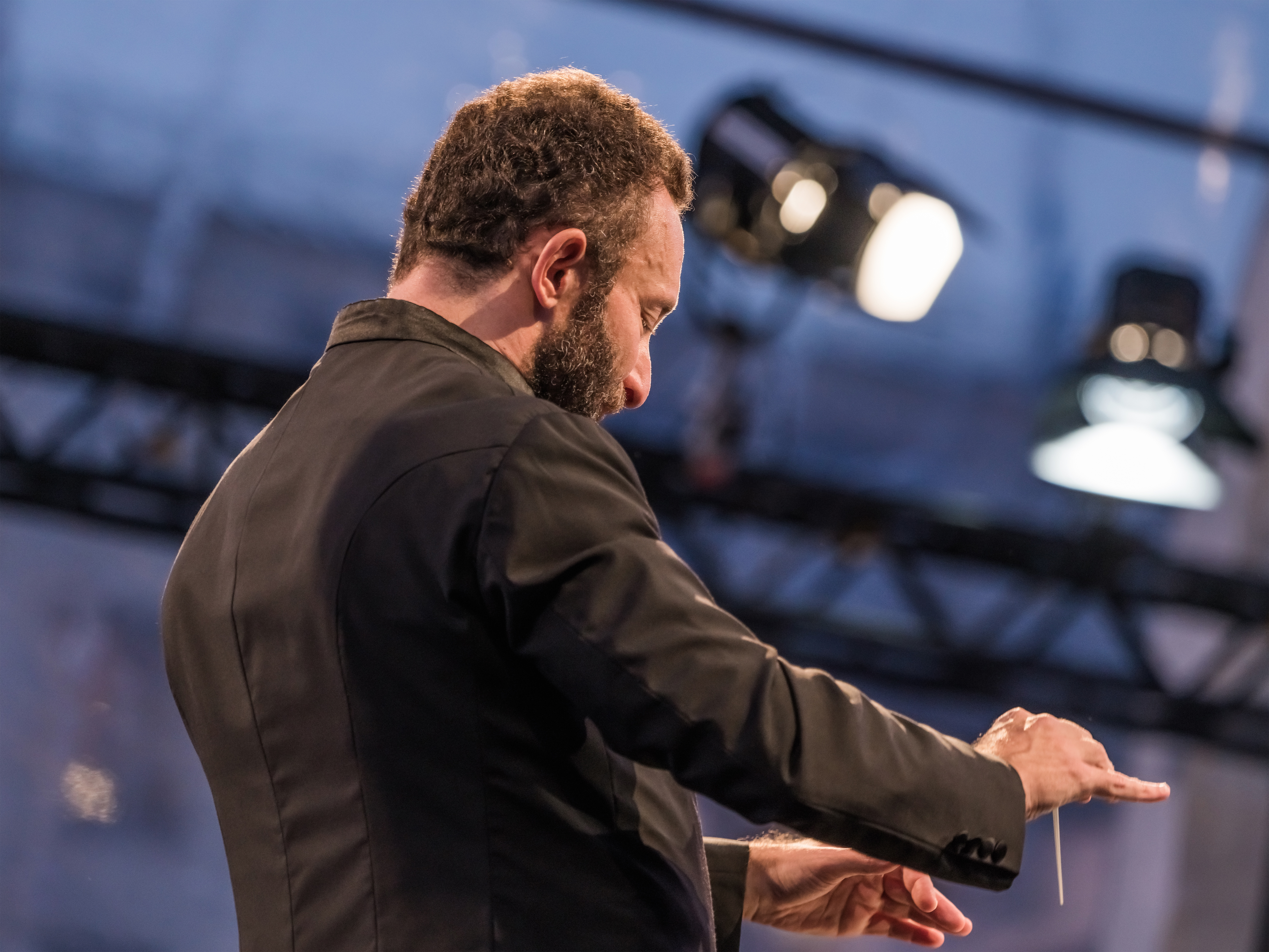

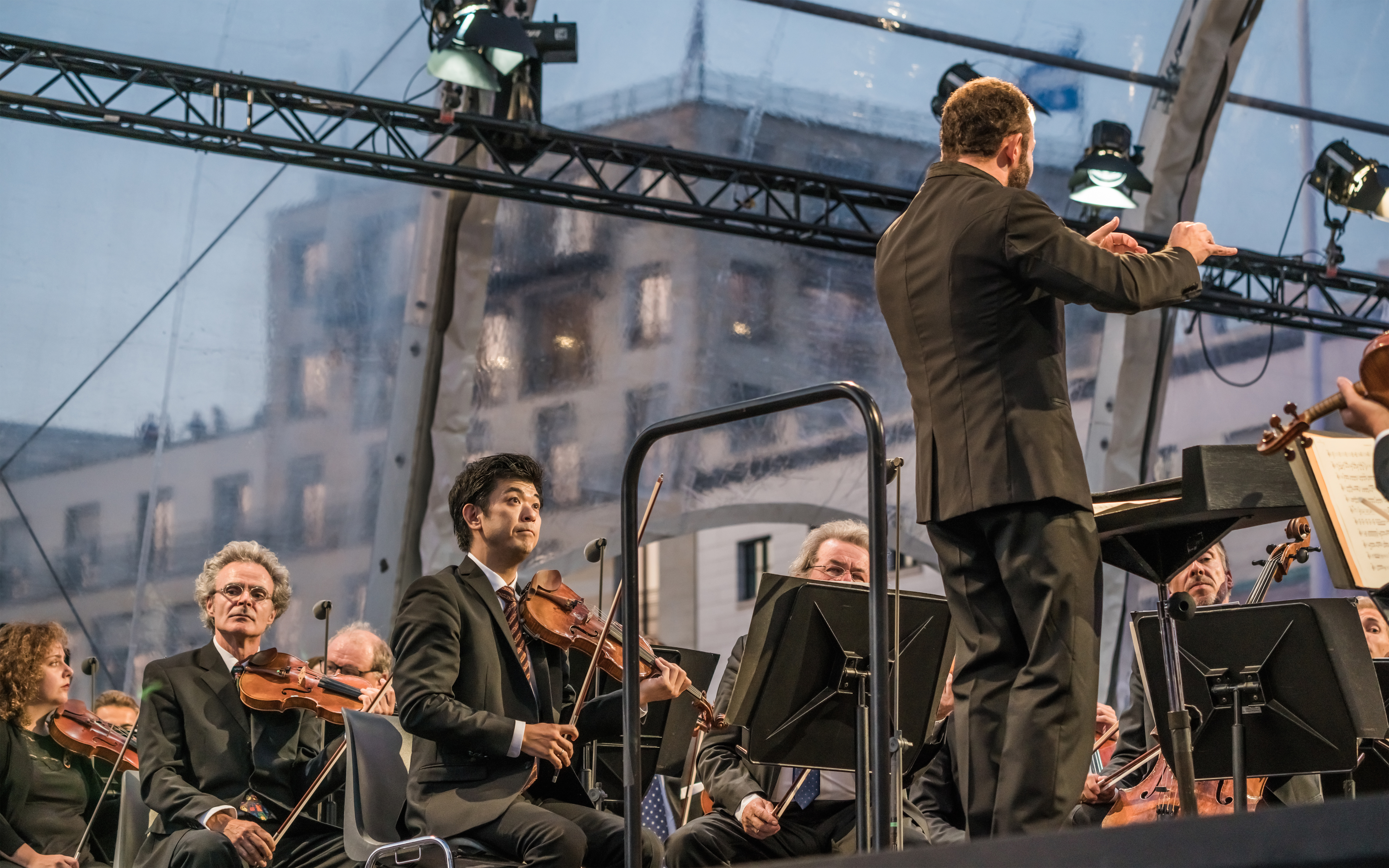

== Awards ==
- 2014, 2020/21 International Opera Awards (Conducting)
- 2026 Léonie Sonning Music Prize

Cultural offices
Preceded by Marie-Jeanne Dufour	Generalmusikdirektor, Südthüringisches Staatstheater; 1999–2002	Succeeded by Fabrizio Ventura
Preceded by Yakov Kreizberg	Generalmusikdirektor, Komische Oper Berlin; 2002–2007	Succeeded by Carl St.Clair
Preceded by Kent Nagano	Generalmusikdirektor, Bavarian State Opera; 2013–2021	Succeeded by Vladimir Jurowski
