= Jan Schultsz =

Dutch pianist and conductor

Jan Schultsz (born 1965 in Amsterdam) is a Dutch pianist and conductor. He is an accompanist in lieder recitals.

== Biography ==
Schultsz first took piano lessons at the age of 4 and commenced horn lessons at the age of 10. Emphasis was laid on both these instruments during his student years under Jan Wijn and Adriaan van Woudenberg at the Sweelinck Conservatoire in Amsterdam. In 1986, he removed to Basel, where he continued his studies of the horn among other instruments at the Schola Cantorum Basiliensis under Thomas Müller-Pering and at the Conservatoire de Lausanne under Bruno Schneider. He was finally awarded the Premier Prix de Virtuosité and played in numerous orchestras, such as the Concertgebouw Orchestra, the Netherlands Radio Orchestra Hilversum, in the Basle Orchestra, the Camerata Bern and in various Baroque ensembles such as the Concerto Köln, the Freiburg Baroque Orchestra and the Clementi Consort.

Jan Schultsz ended his studies of the piano at the City of Basel Music Academy under László Gyimesi and Peter Efler. As a concert pianist, he gave concerts together with singers and instrumentalists in many countries of Europe; he was a co-founder of the Kammerorchester Basel and appeared as a soloist with the Sinfonieorchester Basel and with various chamber orchestras. He accompanied the master courses of Hermann Baumann and Paul Tortelier and lead the Lieder and oratorio class at the Bruckner Conservatory Linz. In 1996, the young artist gave his debut at the Carnegie Hall, New York City with the Finnish Cellist, Marko Ylönen. He has also collaborated at the Zürich Opera House. At the present time, he is a professor at the FHNW School of Music in Basel.

=== Conducting ===
From 1991 to 1995, Schultsz studied for the position of orchestral leader in Basel, Bern and Zürich under Horst Stein, Manfred Honeck, Wilfried Boettcher and Ralf Weikert. He took part in courses on conducting under Jorma Panula in Helsinki and under Sir Edward Downes in the Kyrill Konrashin Conductors Master Classes in the Netherlands. He has also studied at the Saint Petersburg Conservatory under Ilya Musin.

He has appeared as a guest conductor with many orchestras in Europe. In this position, he has conducted the Chamber Orchestra in Basel, Tonhalle Orchestra in Zürich, the Sinfonieorchester Basel, the Mozarteum Orchestra of Salzburg, the Vienna Chamber Orchestra, the Hungarian National Orchestra in Budapest, the Orchestre de Chambre of Geneva, the RTL Orchestra in Luxembourg, the Bieler Orchester-Gesellschaft (OGB), the Orchester Musikkollegium Winterthur, the Radio Symphony Orchestra of Hilversum and the L'Orchestre de chambre de Neuchâtel (OCN) at which he has been retained as musical director as from 1999 until his retirement in 2009. He was engaged as orchestral leader at the Oslo Opera House and conducted the Hungarian State Opera in Budapest. Schultsz has also contributed to numerous radio and television programmes. He has won several awards and scholarships Schultsz was appointed as jury for the final of the first Altenburg International Baroque Trumpet Competition in 1996. Schultsz recently toured Asia with the Gstaad Menuhin Festival Orchestra and soloist Lynnette Seah, as a part of the orchestra and festival's 50th anniversary celebration.

== Discography ==
Jan Schultsz has recorded several recordings of works by composers such as Bellini, Delibes, Mendelssohn, Mozart, Rossini, Schumann and Verdi. As an accompanist he often works with soloists such as Romanian soprano de:Elena Moșuc, Jenő Jandó, Birgit Remmert and Felix Renggli. He has also recorded Winterreise by Schubert with Hungarian bass Laszlo Polgar.
