= EMSO =

EMSO may refer to:

- EMŠO, the Slovenian Unique Master Citizen Number.
- EMSO simulator, a software package whose name stands for "Environment for Modelling, Simulation and Optimisation"
- The orchestral component of the European Medical Students' Orchestra and Choir
- European Multidisciplinary Seafloor and water column Observatory, a European research infrastructure
- Existential monadic second-order logic, a fragment of second-order logic in which all second-order quantifiers must be existential quantifiers over sets
