= Iași "Moldova" Philharmonic Orchestra =

Symphony orchestra in Iași, Romania

Moldova Philharmonic Iași
- Filarmonica Moldova Iași
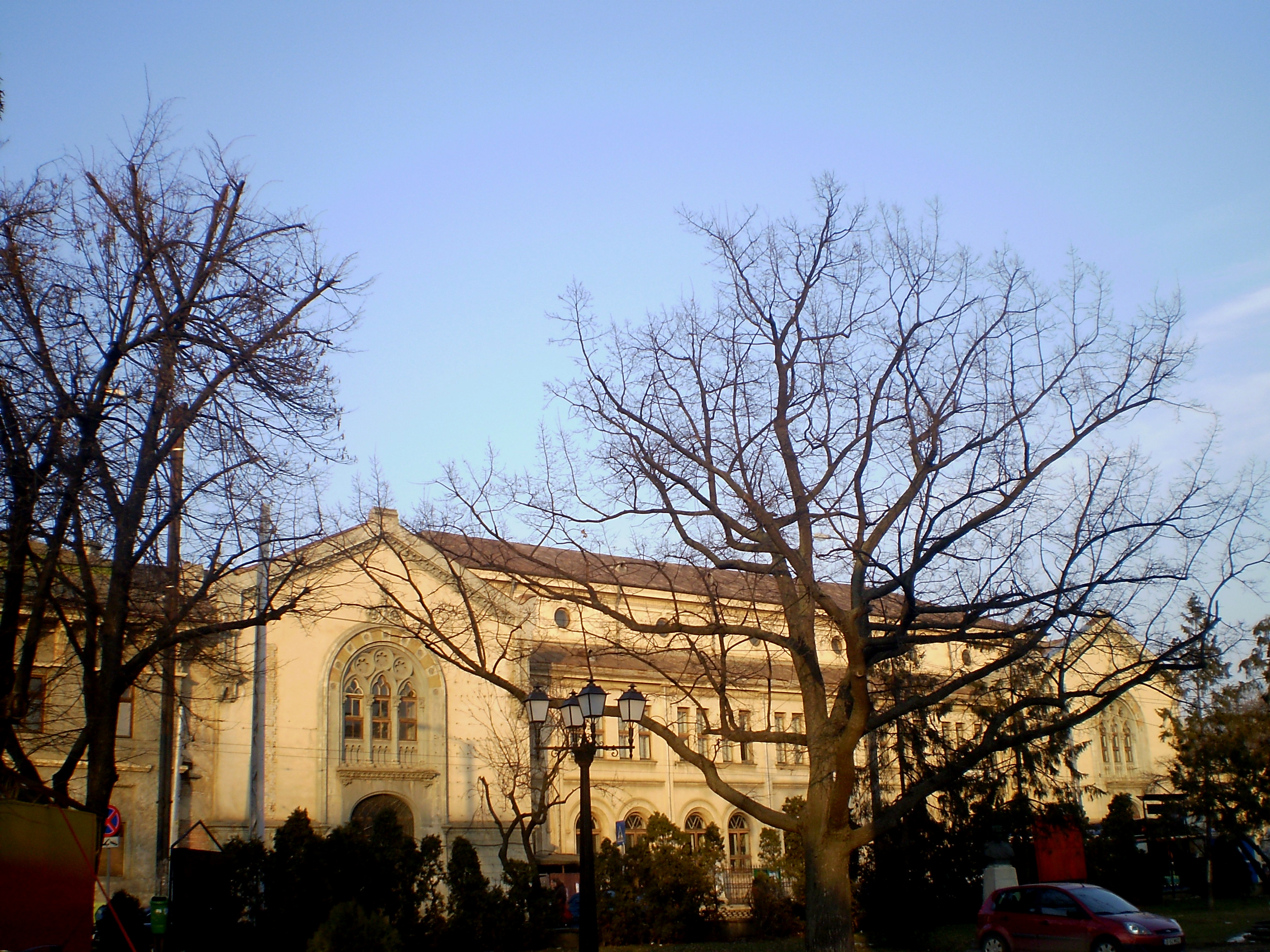
- The concert halls building

General information
- Architectural style: Neoclassical (Balș House) neo-Gothic (Notre Dame Institute)
- Location: Iași, Romania
- Completed: 1815 (Balș House); 1900 (Notre Dame Institute)
- Renovated: 1957

Design and construction
- Architects: Enrico Gambara and I. Vignali (Notre Dame Institute)

Other information
- Seating capacity: 560 (Ion Baciu hall); 300 (Gavriil Musicescu hall); 144 (Eduard Caudella hall)

Website
- filarmonicais.ro

The Moldova Philharmonic Orchestra (Romanian: Filarmonica Moldova Iași) is a Romanian symphony orchestra located in Iași, Romania. The name "Moldova" in the title refers to the historical region of Moldavia.

== History ==
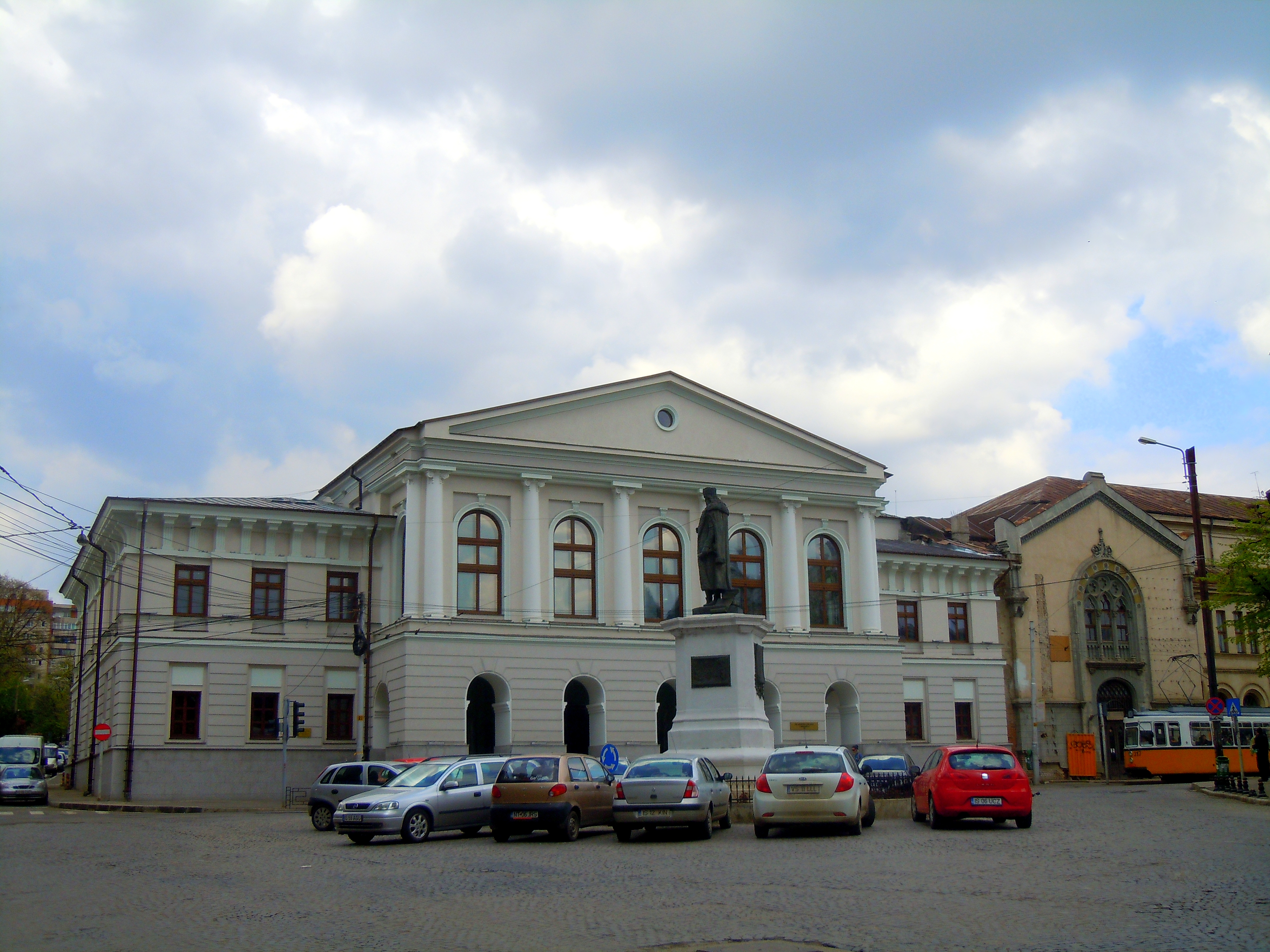
Alecu Balș House (1815)

During the 18th and 19th centuries, Iași, as the main city and capital of the former Principality of Moldavia, had been closely connected to European musical life, and great European musicians used to play in the city. In 1860, Conservatory of music and dramatic art was founded, followed, in 1868, by the Iași Philharmonic Society. The first full season of concerts was performed during 1905–06.

Moldova State Philharmonic, as an institution with permanent artistic activity, held its inaugural concert on 9 October 1942, conducted by George Enescu. Since 1962, the orchestra has been under the direction of Ion Baciu, who leveraged the rich musical heritage of Iaşi to attract a new generation of students from the Conservatory. Under his leadership, the ensemble emerged as a prominent force in Romanian national musical culture, embarking on tours across Europe and North America. In 1986, Baciu was succeeded by Gherghe Costin, who held the position for thirteen years. From 1995 to 2001, Costin was accompanied by Camil Marinescu, and in 1998, Alexandru Lascae joined as the resident conductor, a role he continues to hold today.

Its primary performing venue is located in the former Notre Dame de Sion (Sacré-Cœur) Institute's chapel, which is listed in the National Register of Historic Monuments. The main auditorium seats 560, and is named after the conductor Ion Baciu; the second auditorium seats 300, and is named after the composer Gavriil Musicescu. A smaller hall, with 144 seats, named after the composer Eduard Caudella, is located at the first floor of the Balș House, the same building which hosted, on 18 January 1847, the concert of the pianist and composer Franz Liszt.

== See also ==
- Iași Romanian National Opera
- George Enescu National University of Arts
- List of symphony orchestras in Europe
- List of concert halls
