= James S. Kahane =

French-German conductor

- Born: James Salomon Kahane; 28 July 1995 (age 31); Paris, France
- Education: Sibelius Academy
- Occupation: Orchestra conductor
- Organizations: Hamilton Philharmonic Orchestra; Helsinki Chamber Orchestra; Orchestre de Chambre de la Drôme
- Website: jameskahane.com

James Salomon Kahane (born 28 July 1995 in Paris) is a French-German conductor. Known professionally as James S. Kahane or James Kahane, he is currently principal conductor of the Helsinki Chamber Orchestra, co-principal conductor of the Orchestre de Chambre de la Drôme, and music director of the Hamilton Philharmonic Orchestra.

== Biography ==
As a youth, Kahane studied the piano. At age 14, Kahane entered the Conservatoire à rayonnement communal du 13e arrondissement de Paris. He developed an interest in conducting at age 17, and subsequently enrolled at the Sibelius Academy, where he studied from 2015 to 2021 and his conducting teachers included Atso Almila and Sakari Oramo, as well as Hannu Lintu. He has participated in conducting masterclasses at the Menuhin Festival Gstaad, the Lucerne Festival and the Tanglewood Festival, with such conductors as Paavo Järvi, Bernard Haitink, Susanna Mälkki, Matthias Pintscher, David Zinman, Roger Norrington, Mikko Franck, Leif Segerstam, Jorma Panula, Johannes Schlaefli and Nicolás Pasquet.

Since 2016, Kahane has been affiliated with the Far(away) Ensemble. In 2017 and 2018, Kahane was assistant conductor to Susanna Mälkki at the Helsinki Philharmonic Orchestra. In 2018, he was appointed conductor of the Polytech Orchestra (Espoo, Finland). In 2019, he became principal conductor of the re-founded Helsinki Chamber Orchestra. Kahane was one of the three protagonists of the documentary movie Orkesterin Edessä (Conductivity), released in 2020, which followed him as a young conducting student at the Sibelius Academy. In 2022, Kahane made his first recording as a conductor for Resonus Classics

In 2023, Kahane became co-principal conductor of the Orchestre de Chambre de la Drôme. In June and July 2024, Kahane served as assistant conductor to Lintu at the Bayerische Staatsoper for their production of Pelléas et Mélisande. In the summer of 2025, Kahane assisted Lintu at the Bregenzer Festpiele on a production of George Enescu's Œdipe.

In October 2023, Kahane first guest-conducted the Hamilton Philharmonic Orchestra (HPO). In May 2024, the HPO announced the appointment of Kahane as its next music director, effective with the 2024–2025 season. In September 2026, the HPO announced an extension of Kahane's contract as its music director through the 2029–2030.

== Discography ==
- Rodrigo, Ibert, Jolivet: Flute Concertos, with Sami Junnonen and the Helsinki Chamber Orchestra (2024, Resonus Classics)

Cultural offices
Preceded by Eero Lehtimäki	Conductor, Polytech Orchestra; 2018–2024	Succeeded by Vuokko Lahtinen
Preceded by (no predecessor)	Principal Conductor, Helsinki Chamber Orchestra; 2019–present	Succeeded by incumbent
Preceded by Mathis Calzetta	Co-Principal Conductor, Orchestre de Chambre de la Drôme; 2023–present	Succeeded by incumbent
Preceded by Gemma New	Music Director, Hamilton Philharmonic Orchestra; 2024–present	Succeeded by incumbent
