= Claudius Traunfellner =

Austrian conductor (born 1965)

Claudius Traunfellner (born 7 February 1965) is an Austrian conductor.

== Life and career ==
Born in Vienna, Austria, Traunfellner took violin lessons at the University of Music and Performing Arts Vienna, where he completed his studies in 1986. He had already obtained the artistic diploma for choral and ensemble conducting there in 1985. From 1987 to 1989, he studied conducting with Karl Österreicher at the University of Music and Performing Arts Vienna.

In 1985, Traunfellner founded the Vienna Chamber Philharmonic, of which he has been artistic director ever since. With this and other orchestras, the conductor has given numerous performances at home and abroad, in all the renowned concert halls in Austria as well as in the US, Canada, South America, Japan, Taiwan, France, Belgium, Germany, Denmark, Sweden, Italy, Spain, Poland, the Czech Republic, Slovakia, Greece.

Traunfellner is frequently engaged as a guest conductor by other orchestras. As such, he has worked with the Orchestra of Bolzano (1991), the Philharmonic Orchestra of Wroclaw (1992), the Orchestre National du Capitole de Toulouse (1992), the Orchestre National de Lyon (1990), the Orchestre Lamoureux (2002), the Orchestre d'Auvergne (2004), the Orchestre National de Bretagne (2003), the Orchestre national des Pays de la Loire (2003), the RSO Saarbrücken (2003), the Bruckner Orchester Linz (1993), the RSO Vienna (1993 and 1995), the NTO (1994, 1997 and 1999), the KSO (1996), the Austrian-Hungarian Haydn Philharmonic (1996), the Symphony Orchestra Vorarlberg (1994, 1997 and 1999), the Mozarteum Orchestra Salzburg (1996, 2002), the Vienna Chamber Orchestra (1990-1996) and the Mahler Chamber Orchestra (1998).

He has also performed at international festivals such as the Vienna Festival, the Wiener Musiksommer, the Wiener Frühlingsfestival, the Wiener Mozartfest, the Wien Modern, the Haydn Festspiele and the Toulon Festival, the Montpellier Festival, the Le Mans Festival, the St. Gallen Festival and the Rovereto Festival. Gallen, Rovereto, Stresa, Ferrara, Flanders, Bodenseefestival, Rheingau Musik Festival, Mozart Festival Würzburg, the Carinthischer Sommer and the Schubertiade Vorarlberg.

Among the opera productions Traunfellner has conducted in Vienna and Bregenz are Le nozze di Figaro, The Barber of Seville and La Cenerentola. Traunfellner's repertoire ranges from the baroque to the modern, with the conductor paying particular attention to works by Austrian composers. Traunfellner has recorded several CDs with the Vienna Chamber Philharmonic, the Vienna RSO and the Vienna Chamber Orchestra, including serenades, symphonies and concert arias by Mozart, Schönberg's Transfigured Night and numerous works by living Austrian composers.
