= Hamilton Philharmonic Orchestra =

Canadian professional symphony orchestra

- Orchestra
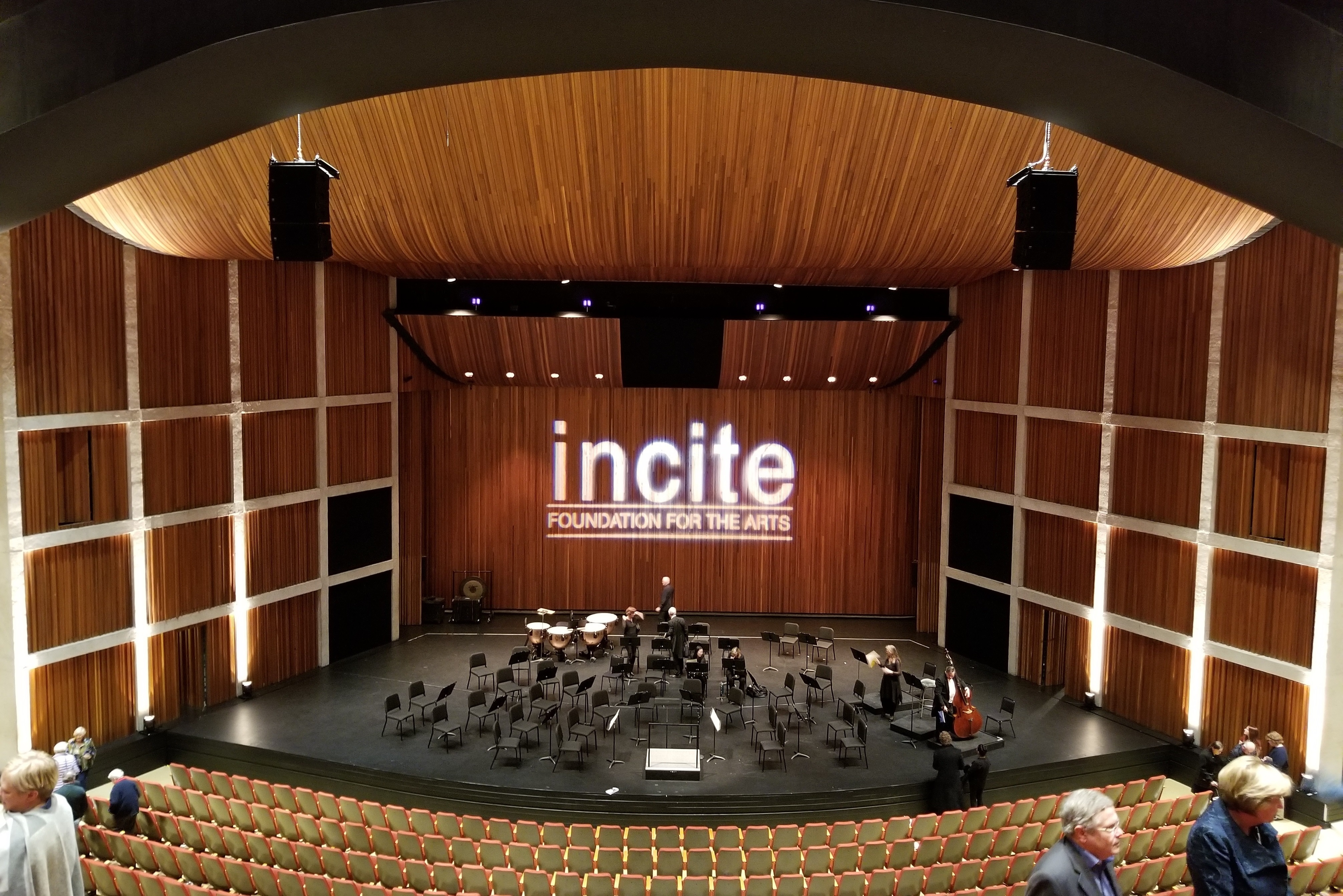
- Great Hall at FirstOntario Concert Hall
- Founded: 1949; 77 years ago
- Location: Hamilton, Ontario, Canada
- Concert hall: FirstOntario Concert Hall
- Principal conductor: James S. Kahane
- Website: www.hpo.org

The Hamilton Philharmonic Orchestra (HPO) is a Canadian orchestra based in Hamilton, Ontario. The orchestra gives concerts primarily at the FirstOntario Concert Hall.

== History ==
The Hamilton Philharmonic Orchestra was founded in 1949. Its first concert took place on 16 January 1950, at the Memorial School Auditorium. Jan Wolanek was the first music director of the orchestra, from 1949 to 1958. During the orchestra's history, Olive Short served as its concertmaster, the first female concertmaster in North America.

In the late 1960s, Betty Webster, Marnie Paikin, and Larry Paikin developed a plan, known as "The Hamilton Plan", to bring music to the community from in-school children's concerts to international artists appearing with the orchestra. They organized concerts at which all school children within a 60-mile radius of Hamilton centre (excluding Toronto) heard a brass ensemble, woodwind ensemble, string quartet and percussion ensemble in their school, followed by a trip to the orchestra hall at the end of the school year to hear a full symphony orchestra concert. The American Symphony Orchestra League studied this programme. Chuck Mangione engaged the HPO for his Grammy-nominated album Friends In Love.

To carry out the plan, Boris Brott was hired as music director in 1969. Under his direction, attendance at HPO concerts rose to about 225,000 throughout the early 1970s. Under Brott, the orchestra developed to the point where it could accompany well-known international artists, including Phillipe Entremont and Maureen Forrester, and began to develop an international reputation. In 1984, Michael Quigley published a book about the orchestra, A Centenary History of the Hamilton Philharmonic Orchestra. However, the change in focus from a community orchestra to a full-time professional orchestra led to financial difficulties, and concert attendance began to recede. Brott remained conductor of the orchestra until 1990.

In 1996, the orchestra declared bankruptcy. The orchestra re-emerged in 1997 as the New Hamilton Orchestra, with Mario Bernardi its as part-time artistic advisor through 1999. Daniel Lipton succeeded Bernardi as part-time artistic advisor for the 1999–2000 season. In 2000, the orchestra reverted to its former name. Michael Reason served as its full-time artistic director from 2001 to 2006. After an interim period with Timothy Vernon as artistic advisor, James Sommerville was music director of the HPO from 2007 to 2015.

In 2015, the HPO named Gemma New as its music director, the first female conductor to hold the post. The orchestra gave its first performance under her direction in February 2016. New was music director of the HPO through the 2023–2024 season.

In October 2023, James S. Kahane first guest-conducted the HPO. In May 2024, the HPO announced the appointment of Kahane as its next music director, effective with the 2024–2025 season. In September 2026, the HPO announced an extension of Kahane's contract as its music director for an additional three seasons through June 2030.

== Music directors ==
- Jan Wolanek (1949–1958)
- Leonard Pearlman, Bryden Thomson (1958–1959)
- Victor Di Bello (1958–1962)
- Lee Hepner (1962–1969)
- Boris Brott (1969–1990)
- Victor Feldbrill (1990–1996)
- James Sommerville (2007–2015)
- Gemma New (2015–2024)
- James S. Kahane (2024–present)
