= Gemma New =

New Zealand conductor (born 1986)

Gemma New ONZM
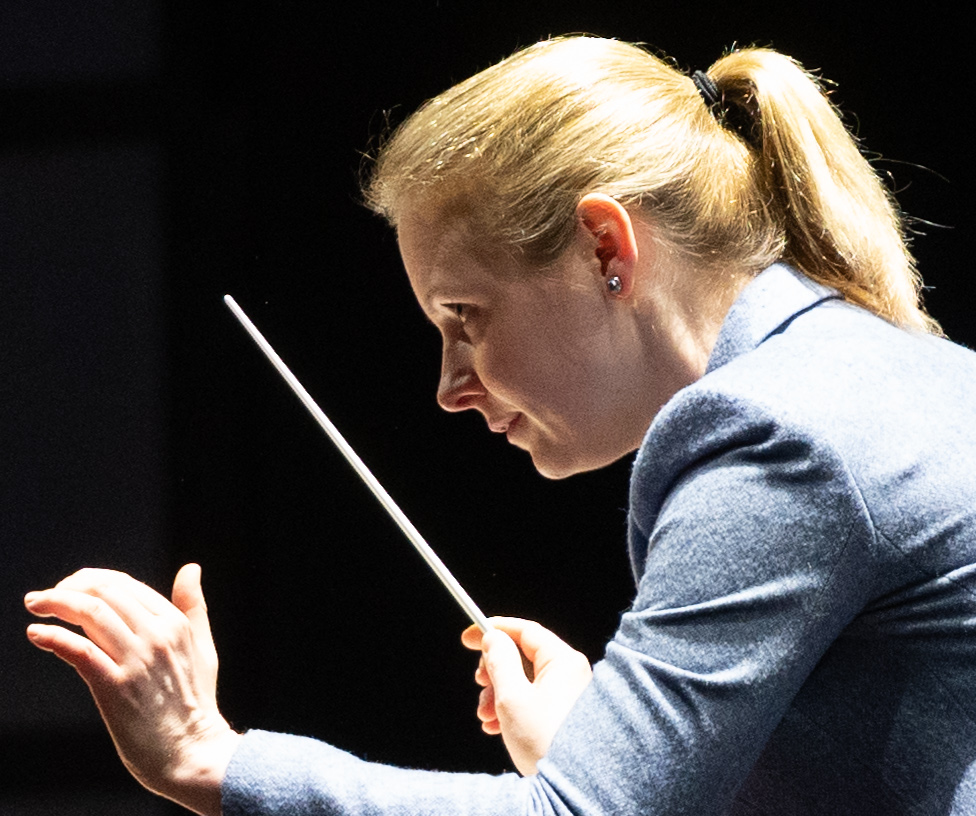

Background information
- Born: Gemma Elizabeth New; 27 December 1986 (age 39); Wellington, New Zealand
- Occupations: Conductor, composer
- Instruments: Violin, piano
- Website: www.gemmanew.com

Gemma Elizabeth New ONZM (born 27 December 1986) is a New Zealand-born conductor. She is currently principal conductor of the New Zealand Symphony Orchestra.

== Early life and education ==
Born into a musical family, New began violin studies at age 5, and piano lessons at age 8. By age 12, she was playing in a youth orchestra in Wellington. As a teenager, she conducted the Christchurch Youth Orchestra. New attended Samuel Marsden Collegiate School, in Karori, Wellington, from 1991 to 2004.

New read physics, mathematics, and music at the University of Canterbury, from which she graduated with a degree in music. She later earned a graduate degree in music from Baltimore, Maryland's Peabody Institute.

== Career ==
New founded and directed the Maryland music collective Lunar Ensemble, with which she has premiered 26 compositions. New was assistant conductor of the New Jersey Symphony Orchestra from 2011 to 2016. In the 2014–2015 season, she was a Dudamel Conducting Fellow with the Los Angeles Philharmonic Orchestra. For 2014, she was a Kurt Masur conducting fellow.

In May 2015, the Hamilton Philharmonic Orchestra (HPO) named New as its next music director, the first female conductor ever named to the post. This appointment marked New's first music directorship. Her first performance in the post was in February 2016. In May 2017, the HPO extended New's contract as music director through the 2020–2021 season. In November 2020, the HPO announced a further extension of New's contract as music director through the 2023–2024 season. New concluded her HPO tenure at the close of the 2023-2024 season.

In June 2016, New was appointed resident conductor of the St. Louis Symphony Orchestra (SLSO) and music director of the Saint Louis Symphony Youth Orchestra. In September 2018, New directed the opening concerts of the SLSO's 2018–2019 season, the first female conductor ever to do so. She stood down from her St. Louis posts at the close of the 2019–2020 season. In October 2018, the Dallas Symphony Orchestra announced the appointment of New as its next principal guest conductor, the first female conductor to hold the title, effective with the 2019–2020 season. She served in the post through the 2022–2023 season.

The New Zealand Symphony Orchestra (NZSO) appointed New as its artistic adviser and principal conductor in 2022, the first woman to hold the posts. She is scheduled to stand down from both NZSO posts in 2027, and subsequently to take the title of artistic partner with the NZSO.

New is represented by Charlotte Lee at Primo Artists.

== Honours and awards ==
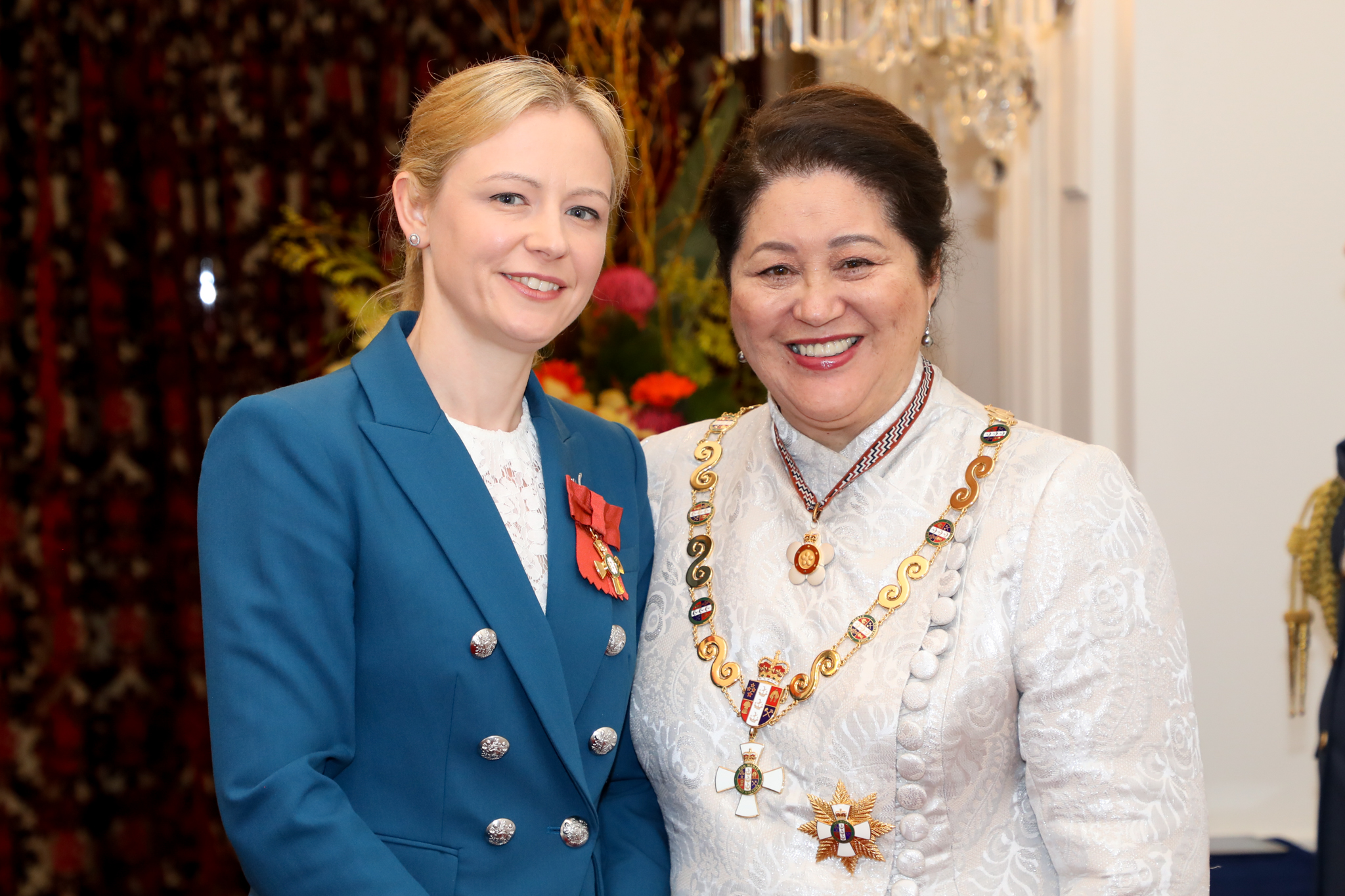
New (left), after her investiture as an Officer of the New Zealand Order of Merit by the governor-general, Dame Cindy Kiro, at Government House, Wellington, on 10 September 2024

In March 2021, the Solti Foundation U.S. announced New as the 12th recipient of The Sir Georg Solti Conducting Award.

In the 2024 King’s Birthday Honours, New was appointed an Officer of the New Zealand Order of Merit, for services to music direction.

Cultural offices
Preceded by James Sommerville	Music Director, Hamilton Philharmonic Orchestra; 2015–2024	Succeeded by James S. Kahane
Preceded by Edo de Waart (music director)	Principal Conductor, New Zealand Symphony Orchestra; 2022–present	Succeeded by incumbent
