= Barry Douglas (pianist) =

Northern Irish pianist (born 1960)

Barry Douglas CBE
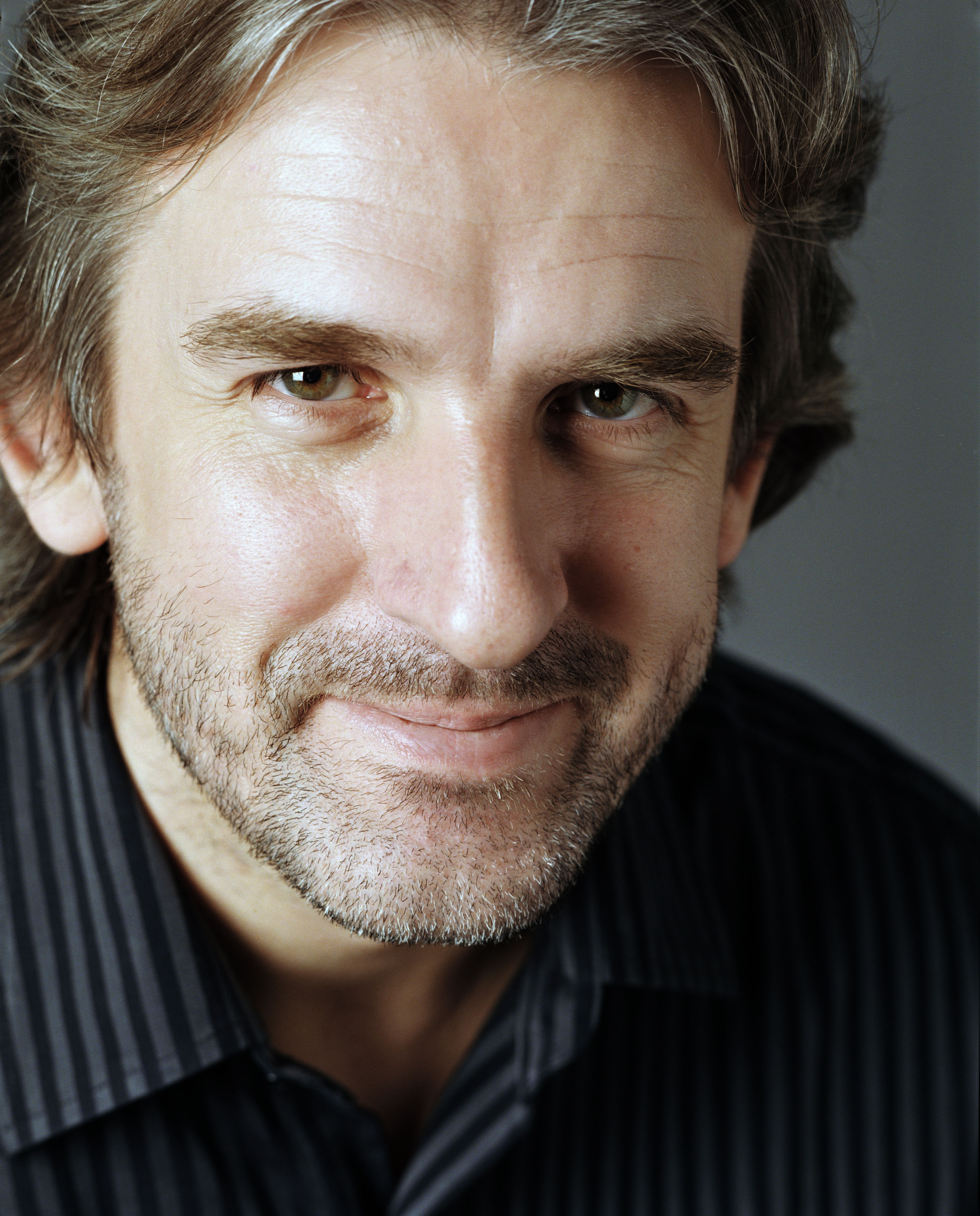

Background information
- Born: William Barry Douglas; 23 April 1960 (age 66); Belfast, Northern Ireland
- Genre: Classical
- Occupations: Musician, conductor
- Instrument: Piano
- Years active: 1978–present
- Labels: Chandos; RCA Victor Red Seal; Satirino France
- Member of: Camerata Ireland
- Website: www.barrydouglas.com

William Barry Douglas CBE (born 23 April 1960) in Belfast, Northern Ireland, is a classical pianist and conductor.

== Early life and education ==
He studied piano, cello, clarinet and organ while growing up in Belfast. He first studied in Belfast while attending Methodist College Belfast and, at 16, had lessons with Felicitas LeWinter, a pupil of Emil von Sauer and grand-pupil of Franz Liszt. In London he studied with John Barstow for four years and then studied privately with Maria Curcio, the last and favourite pupil of Artur Schnabel, going on to study with the Russian pianist Yevgeny Malinin in Paris. He won the Bronze Medal at the Van Cliburn International Piano Competition in Texas in 1985 and second prize in the 1980 Paloma O'Shea Santander International Piano Competition in Spain. He won the gold medal outright in the International Tchaikovsky Competition in 1986.

== Career ==
His debut album was a recording of Modest Mussorgsky's Pictures at an Exhibition. He has made many recordings since then and in 2007 he completed (with Camerata Ireland) recording the five Beethoven piano concertos and the Triple Concerto (with Kim Chee-yun and Andrés Díaz). He is Artistic Director of the International Piano Festival in Manchester, England and the Clandeboye Festival in Clandeboye, Bangor, County Down. He founded Camerata Ireland in 1998 which had Elizabeth II and Mary McAleese (the then President of Ireland) as Joint Patrons.

Douglas increasingly devotes part of his time to conducting the Camerata Ireland orchestra. He has directed cycles of the complete Beethoven symphonies (in November 2002) and Mozart and Schubert symphonies and Mozart concertos in 2000 and 2001. He has made recordings for the RCA Victor Red Seal and Satirino France labels.

== Later awards ==
Douglas was appointed Officer of the Order of the British Empire (OBE) in the 2002 New Year Honours List for services to music. He also received a Fellowship of the Royal College of Music where he is Visiting Prince Consort Professor of Piano, and an Hon. Doctorate of Music from Queen's University Belfast. He received an honorary Doctorate of Music from the National University of Ireland in September 2007. He was appointed Commander of the Order of the British Empire (CBE) in the 2021 New Year Honours for services to music and to community relations in Northern Ireland.

He is married and has three children. He shares his time between Paris and Lurgan.
