= Reuss Chamber Orchestra =

- Orchestra
- Logo of Reussian Chamber Orchestra
- Former name: Kammerorchester der Bühnen der Stadt Gera
- Founded: 1960
- Location: Gera, Thuringia
- Website: reussisches-kammerorchester.de

The Reuss Chamber Orchestra (German: Reußisches Kammerorchester) is a German chamber orchestra in Gera (Thuringia), which sees itself as integral part of the Theater Altenburg-Gera.

The aim of the Reuss Chamber Orchestra is to enrich the concert life of Gera, Altenburg and the region Eastern Thuringia, and to promote the cultural strength of the region nationwide.

== History ==
The concert life of the city of Gera is based on the tradition of the orchestra of the House of Reuss, which can be traced back to the year 1696.

Concertmaster Herbert Voigt of the Philharmonic Orchestra founded the „Kammerorchester der Bühnen der Stadt Gera“ in the 1960/61 orchestra season. In 1987 it was awarded the title "Philharmonic Orchestra". In 2000 it was merged with the traditional Landeskapelle Altenburg. In 2011, the Reuss Chamber Orchestra celebrates its 50th anniversary.
Honoring the merits of the House of Reuss, Gera, the orchestra was renamed to "Reuss Chamber Orchestra" in 1989.

== Management ==
- CEO: Solo oboist Guenter Gaebler
- CFO: Violinists Egbert Funda
- Art Director: NN

== Concerts ==
Concert tours have taken the Reuss Chamber Orchestra to various German federal states and a variety of European countries. Highlights include concerts with the Thomanerchor Leipzig and the Dresdner Kreuzchor. The soloists Gerhard Bosse, Karl Suske, Ludwig Güttler, Burkhard Glaetzner, Michael Sanderling, Michael Schoenheit and Andreas Hartmann worked and played music with the Reuss Chamber Orchestra. A CD has been recorded with Georg Fritzsch as conductor and Felix Friedrich as a soloist. The record presents an unknown organ concert by Ottorino Respighi to the public. Other DVD productions are available.

Outstanding in the history of the Reuss Chamber Orchestra is the musical accompaniment of the first two services of the consecration of the rebuilt Dresden Frauenkirche. Ever since, there has been intensive cooperation with the Frauenkirche cantor Matthias Gruenert, which has led to various joint concerts, going beyond the cities Gera, Altenburg and Dresden.

In 2008, 2010 and 2011 the Reuss Chamber Orchestra accompanied the New Year's church service in the Dresdner Frauenkirche broadcast by national TV station ZDF. The 2011 New Year's service can be viewed in the ZDF Media library.
