= Sunderland Symphony Orchestra =

Semi-professional symphony orchestra based in Sunderland, England

The Sunderland Symphony Orchestra is a semi-professional symphony orchestra based in Sunderland, England. The orchestra was created by Sunderland City Council in 1999 to commemorate the Millennium.

== History ==
To create a long-term commemoration of the Millennium, the three councillors for the Thornholme Ward of Sunderland, John Lennox, Winifred Lundgren and Mark Greenfield planned to create a symphony orchestra for the community. A public meeting was called on 1 October, 1999, at which it was decided to establish 'The City of Sunderland Millennium Orchestral Society' (CoSMOS) with musicians at that meeting forming the core membership of the new orchestra. Rupert Hanson was appointed musical director and principal conductor, and he developed the orchestra in consultation with society members. The orchestra performed its first full symphony, Dvořák's 9th (The "New World Symphony"), on 7 April 2001.

=== Management ===
The new society later became a registered charity, and changed its name to 'Sunderland Symphony Orchestra' in 2006. Following Hanson's death in August 2009, Mun Ying Lin was appointed interim musical director. Ray Farr was appointed musical director and principal conductor in November 2009. After four years in the post, Farr moved elsewhere to become associate conductor with the Grimethorpe Colliery Band and was succeeded by Paul Judson, a founder member of the orchestra, in January 2014. Judson stood down as musical director in July 2018 after developing hearing problems, and was succeeded by David Milner. Judson continued to play bassoon in the orchestra and was appointed Deputy Conductor and made an honorary member of the orchestra. The leader of the orchestra until September 2012 was David McCourt. Judith Thompson took over the position, and McCourt played cello with the orchestra for a short time.

=== West Park Church ===
The orchestra rehearsed and performed at West Park Church, Stockton Road, Sunderland SR2 7AQ, until 2023. The building became privately owned in March 2018, but continues to be known as West Park Church.

=== Performances ===
The orchestra gives four concerts a year, often at St Gabriel's Church, Sunderland. Performances have also been given at the Sunderland Empire Theatre, the Sage Gateshead, Houghton Feast and the Stadium of Light.
