= European Medical Students' Orchestra and Choir =

- Formation: 1993
- Type: International Organization
- Location: Europe
- Official language: English
- Website: https://emsoc-info.eu

European Medical Students' Orchestra and Choir (EMSOC) consists of medical students and young doctors from all over Europe, all of whom have passion and talent for making music. Each year, the orchestra and the choir meet in a different European city for around ten days of intensive rehearsals and social activities, culminating in several concerts. The proceeds of the benefit concerts go to a selected non-profit medical aid organization. Each course is organised by medical students and junior doctors in the particular host country.

== History ==
It began in 2009 when European Medical Students' Orchestra (EMSO) and European Medical Students' Choir (EMSC) joined forces to produce a spectacular series of concerts in Ljubljana and Piran, Slovenia under the direction of two conductors - Martina Batič and Marjan Grdadolnik. The union of the orchestra and the choir was so successful that the cooperation of EMSO and EMSC continued with concerts in Chester Cathedral and the Royal Northern College of Music, Manchester, United Kingdom in 2010 under the conduction of John Anderson and Daniel Parkinson, as well as in Giessen and Frankfurt, Germany in 2011, under the leadership of Stefan Ottersbach and Anna Katharina Kalmbach.

In 2012 the orchestra and the choir assembled in the Island of Rab and Rijeka, Croatia, where - under the direction of Mladen Tarbuk, and the choir - leadership of Anna Katharina Kalmbach - they continued the tradition of EMSOC. In the following year EMSOC was organized in Hungary by the students of the University of Szeged and the University of Budapest. More than 150 participants from all over Europe gathered to perform two charity concerts under the baton of Péter Somorjai and with the choir leadership of Anna Katharina Kalmbach, presenting Carmina Burana by Carl Orff.

Further meetings of EMSOC took place in Bilbao/Spain (2014), Warsaw/Poland (2015), Prague/Czech Republic (2016), Basel and Geneva/Switzerland (2017) and Rotterdam and Leiden/The Netherlands (2018).

During the summer of 2019 the musicians joined together again for an unforgettable experience in Granada, Spain, performing Karl Jenkins’s Gloria and other pieces.

In 2020 the meeting was scheduled to take place in Germany. Due to the Covid 19 pandemic this meeting was delayed until 2021.

=== Germany ===
The European Medical Students’ Orchestra (EMSO) was founded in Würzburg, Germany in 1993. Since its origins as a chamber orchestra in 1993, EMSO has grown in size and popularity to a full symphony orchestra of about 60 musicians from more than 20 European countries. In Ljubljana, 1996, the orchestra's performance of Mendelssohn's Violin Concerto was sold out, and the concert was broadcast on Slovenian national radio. In Budapest in 2002, a Hungarian journalist wrote that the orchestra's performance of Liszt's Piano Concerto was “thrilling from beginning to the end”. In Poznan, 2004, the concert was attended by more than a thousand listeners in addition to being broadcast by Polish national radio. In a similar way, EMSO has been greeted within various European cities by several notable figures. In Aberdeen, 1999, the orchestra was invited to dine with the Lord Mayor of Aberdeen, and in Porto, 2001, it was welcomed by the Portuguese Culture Secretary. Since 2009, European Medical Students' Orchestra joined forces with European Medical Students' Choir to form European Medical Students' Orchestra and Choir (EMSOC).

=== United Kingdom ===
The European Medical Students’ Choir (EMSC) was founded in London, England, in 1996, by Vasuki Sivagnavel. Since its beginnings in 1996, EMSC events took place up to twice a year until 2006, when EMSC took a three - years break. In 2009, EMSC combined forces with EMSO forming European Medical Students' Orchestra and Choir (EMSOC).

== See also ==
- List of symphony orchestras in Europe
