= Polytech Orchestra =

- Polytech Orchestra logo
- Native name: Polyteknikkojen Orkesteri
- Short name: PO
- Founded: 1922
- Location: Otaniemi, Espoo
- Principal conductor: Vuokko Lahtinen
- Website: Orchestra website

The Polytech Orchestra (Finnish: Polyteknikkojen Orkesteri; PO) is a symphony orchestra based in Otaniemi, Espoo.

It was founded in 1922 and is thus the oldest Finnish academic student orchestra. The conductor of the orchestra is currently Vuokko Lahtinen. There are about 100 active musicians at the PO, most of whom are students from Aalto University and other universities and schools within the greater Helsinki area.

PO's annual concert program includes autumn, Christmas and spring concerts in the Helsinki metropolitan area and a spring tour to various parts of Finland. The orchestra has also performed abroad in Germany, Hungary, Czech Republic, the Baltic states, Sweden and Scotland. The PO concert program is complemented by various charity and subscription concerts, such as the Printempo Concert at the Aalto University's alongside other music communities (Dominante, The Polytech Choir, Retuperän WBK, Boston Promenade, Polirytmi, Humpsvakar, the Kauppakorkeakoulun Ylioppilaskunnan Laulajat (KYL, Helsinki Academic Male Choir) and the Helsinki Academic Female Choir (KYN). The orchestra includes as well several smaller bands, such as their string quartets, the horn quartet Cornostar and the Polytechnic's Salon Orchestra.

== Conductors ==
- Eero Saari, 1922–23
- Eero Koskimies, 1923–35
- Sulho Ranta, 1935–39
- Heikki Aaltoila, 1940–56
- Aarre Hemming, 1956–58
- Jorma Panula, 1958–60
- Pentti Antila, 1964–66
- Kari Tikka, 1966–68
- Seppo Laamanen, 1968–69
- Ylermi Poijärvi, 1970–73
- Atso Almila, 1975–79
- Ari Rasilainen, 1979–81
- Timo Pulakka, 1982–83
- Juhani Lamminmäki, 1983–86
- Juha Nikkola, 1987–1990
- Sakari Oramo, 1990–92
- Hannu Norjanen, 1992–99, 2003
- Dima Slobodeniouk, 1999–2002
- Eva Ollikainen, 2003–05
- Petri Komulainen, 2005–2013
- Andreas Vogelsberger, 2013–2016
- Eero Lehtimäki, 2016–2018
- James S. Kahane, 2018–2024
- Vuokko Lahtinen, 2024-

== Recordings ==
- Teekkarimarsseja (1937) (produced by the Polytech Orchestra and Choir, ODEON record company)
- 75 Years Celebration of the Polytech Orchestra (1997)
- Tree Time (1997) (Collaboration with Dominante Choir)
- Polyphony (1998) (Humorous concert with other TKY music associations)
- Sibelius recording (2000)
- Tupsahdus recording (2002) (Humorous concert with other TKY music associations)
  - Ouverture solennelle 1812 (by Pyotr Tchaikovsky; recording at the Kallio Church 9/2002)
- Nordgren recording (2005)

== See also ==
- Helsinki University Symphony Orchestra
