= Praga Sinfonietta Orchestra =

Czech classical orchestra

The Praga Sinfonietta Orchestra (short Czech name: Praga Sinfonietta) is a Czech classical orchestra based in Prague.

It was found in the summer of 1990 by conductor Miriam Němcová. The ensemble was able to gain musicians from Prague's most influential orchestras and has been successful in recording and touring throughout European countries like Italy, Germany and Austria. The orchestra concentrates on playing Czech composers like Jan Dismas Zelenka, Johann Stamitz, František Václav Míča, Josef Mysliveček, Bedřich Smetana, Antonín Dvořák and Bohuslav Martinů including various genres starting from the baroque era up to contemporary works of the 20th century. Still the orchestra also includes works by Johann Sebastian Bach, Wolfgang Amadeus Mozart, Johannes Brahms and Igor Stravinsky into its repertoire.
