= Craiova "Oltenia" Philharmonic Orchestra =

The Oltenia Philharmonic Orchestra (Romanian: Filarmonica Oltenia Craiova) is an orchestra in Craiova, Romania. It has been founded in 1904 and established in 1947 by a royal decree. The present activity is carried out by the Symphony Orchestra, the Chamber Orchestra, the Academic Choir and several chamber assemblies.
