= Orquesta Sinfónica de Burgos =

The Burgos Symphony Orchestra (OSBu) is a Spanish orchestral group, based in the city of Burgos, which was founded in 2005 offering its first concert on 1 November of that year. Its usual concert hall is the Auditorium and Congress Palace of Burgos, since its inauguration in 2012, but until then its predecessor venue was the Teatro Principal de Burgos. It is made up of musicians from Burgos and other parts of Spain. Every year scholarship to several students of the Professional Conservatory of Burgos, who participate in the interpretation of works.

By receiving support from the Burgos City Council, the OSBU has a firm commitment to the city, thanks to which it has interpreted works by local authors and has received the collaboration of associations for its interpretations. To highlight works by Antonio José Martínez Palacios, of which among other works his opera "El mozo de mulas" was premiered, as well as works by Rafael Calleja, Ángel Juan Quesada, Alejandro Yagüe, Alberto Hortigüela, Pedro María de la Iglesia, Javier Pérez de Arévalo, Javier Centeno and Laura Puras.

Its first musical director was Javier Castro Villamor between 2005 and 2018. Since 2018 it has been directed by the pianist Iván Martín. It has also had a large number of guest directors.

Every year since its foundation, except for 2020 due to COVID, the OSBU performs five concerts, plus an additional concert performed for a family audience.
