= Camerata Klaipėda =

Camerata Klaipėda is a chamber orchestra in the Lithuanian city of Klaipėda. The 13-member orchestra was established by violinist Vilhelmas Čepinskis in 2004. Most of its members are students at the Lithuanian Academy of Music and Theatre. As of 2009, the orchestra delivered some 150 concerts and published three CD recordings.
