= Camerata Ireland =

Camerata Ireland is a chamber orchestra founded by pianist Barry Douglas. They held their first concert in May 1999 with concerts at the Parliament Buildings in Belfast, Northern Ireland, and the State Apartments in Dublin. The joint Patrons of Camerata Ireland are Mary McAleese President of Ireland and Queen Elizabeth II.

The orchestra is led by co-founder, Barry Douglas. Camerata Ireland brings together musicians who live in Ireland and Irish musicians who play and work abroad.

Camerata Ireland has an annual residency at Clandeboye, Bangor, County Down, in late August each year. This is an event that allows 15 young musicians to have intensive masterclasses with Barry Douglas and other musicians. The winner is awarded the Accenture Young Musician of the year award.
