= Chamartín Symphony Orchestra =

Symphony orchestra based in Madrid, Spain

The Chamartín Symphony Orchestra (Spanish: Orquesta Sinfónica Chamartín) is a symphony orchestra based in Madrid, Spain.

== History ==
The Orchestra, named after the Chamartín administrative district of Madrid, was founded as an ensemble of semi-professional players in 1993 and gave its first concert at a local concert hall. Until 2000 the orchestra worked as two separated ensembles, a chamber and a symphony orchestra, becoming a professional orchestra and starting annual seasons of concerts at the National Auditorium of Music. In addition to its concert season in Madrid, the orchestra has toured Europe, performing in Czech Republic, France, Belgium, Austria and Slovakia.

The founder of the orchestra, Silvia Sanz Torres, is the current principal conductor of the orchestra.

At the heart of the orchestra's repertoire are the most important symphonic works of the 18th and 19th centuries, as well as contemporary music by Spanish composers.

== See also ==
- National Auditorium of Music
