= Orchestre de chambre de Neuchâtel =

The Orchestre de chambre de Neuchâtel (OCN) or Neuchâtel Chamber Orchestra is a Swiss professional orchestra.
