= Symphony Orchestra Vorarlberg =

Orchestra in Vorarlberg, Austria

The Symphony Orchestra Vorarlberg is the only full-professional orchestra in the Austrian state of Vorarlberg.
