= Elinore Pruitt Stewart =

American homesteader and memoirist (1876–1933)

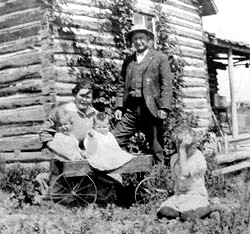
- The Stewart family in 1913: Elinore; Clyde; Clyde, Jr.; Calvin; and Jerrine.
- Born: Elinore Pruitt; June 3, 1876; White Bead Hill, Chickasaw Nation, Indian Territory
- Died: October 8, 1933 (aged 57); Rock Springs, Wyoming, US
- Other name: Elinore Rupert
- Occupations: Wyoming homesteader and writer
- Years active: 1909–15
- Notable work: Letters of a Woman Homesteader

Elinore Pruitt Stewart (born Elinore Pruitt; June 3, 1876 – October 8, 1933) was a homesteader in Wyoming, and a memoirist who between 1909 and 1914 wrote letters describing her life there to a former employer in Denver, Colorado. Those letters, which reveal an adventurous, capable, and resourceful woman of lively intelligence, were published in two collections in 1914 and 1915. The first of those collections, Letters of a Woman Homesteader, was the basis of the 1979 movie Heartland.

== Biography ==
Elinore Pruitt was born on June 3, 1876, in White Bead Hill, then a settlement in Chickasaw Nation, Indian Territory, and as of 2016 is an abandoned township in Garvin County, Oklahoma (founded 1906). Her father died in the late 1870s on Army service near the Mexican border. Shortly afterwards, her mother, Josephine Courtney Pruitt, married her husband's brother, Thomas Isaac Pruitt, and bore eight more children. Elinore was educated for a few years at Pierce Institute near White Bead Hill until that grammar school closed in 1889. In 1893, her mother died of complications from childbirth, and in 1894, her stepfather died in a work accident, leaving the orphaned Elinore responsible for her younger siblings, with only her grandparents available for support.

Around 1902, she married Harry Cramer Rupert, then 48 years old. He died in a railroad accident before their daughter Mary Jerrine was born (February 10, 1906, reportedly in Oklahoma City). She then relocated to Denver, Colorado, where she worked as a laundress, and then in permanent employment as housekeeper for Mrs. Juliet Coney, a widowed schoolteacher from Boston, Massachusetts.

In early 1909, Henry Clyde Stewart (1868–1948), a widower, placed an advertisement in The Denver Post for a housekeeper to help on his homestead near Burntfork, Wyoming. Elinore answered it (with the agreement of Mrs. Coney), and was accepted. She arrived there in March 1909; in early May, she filed a claim for a quarter section adjoining Clyde's homestead under one of the Homestead Acts; and on May 5, she and Clyde were married. Around this time, she began to correspond with Mrs. Coney, in a series of letters which continued until 1914. Those letters were published in Atlantic Monthly and later collected in the books Letters of a Woman Homesteader (1914) and Letters on an Elk Hunt (1915).

She concealed the fact of her marriage for several years during her correspondence because, according to her, she wanted to be independent and to claim the land as her own. In 1912, she relinquished her claim in favor of her mother-in-law; rather than risk losing it for breach of the Homestead Acts' provisions for claims by single women.

By the early 1920s, she had gained national fame as the "Woman Homesteader." Ever practical, she used the royalties from her writings to buy supplies and equipment for the homestead. in 1928, she was included in Grace Raymond Hebard's Map of the History and Romance of Wyoming, a literary map of the state.

Elinore and Clyde had five children: Helen (stillborn, 1910); James Wilber, (February – December 1910, died of erysipelas); Henry Clyde, Jr. (born 1911); Calvin Emery (1912-1971); and Robert Clinton (born 1913). Jerrine, Elinore's daughter by her first marriage, died in 1987.

Elinore died on October 8, 1933, of a blood clot to the brain following gallbladder surgery, at the hospital in Rock Springs, Wyoming. She is buried in Burntfork Cemetery, Sweetwater County, Wyoming. Her husband Clyde is buried by her.

According to another, but unsourced, account, Elinore was born at Fort Smith, Arkansas; spent most of her childhood in Indian Territory; her schooling ended when her teacher was lynched; her parents died when she was 14 years old; after her first husband's death and the birth of Jerrine, she trained as a nurse and worked at a hospital in Burnfork [sic], and in her spare time wrote articles for the Kansas City Star; found work in Denver as a cook; in 1926, suffered serious injuries, from which she never completely recovered, when a horse bolted and she was run over by a hay mower.

Letters of a Woman Homesteader covers the years 1909 to 1914. Letters on an Elk Hunt covers two incident-packed months, August–October 1914, on a licensed elk hunt, for both the adventure and the meat. Her letters have been described as "frank, vivid, eloquent and perceptive". Her biographer Susanne K. George has remarked that "Although largely autobiographical, these works were written for publication, and she was known to have 'never let the facts get in the way of a good story'".

== Legacy ==
The 1979 movie Heartland, directed by Richard Pearce and starring Rip Torn and Conchata Ferrell, was based on Letters of a Woman Homesteader.

In 1985, the Elinore Pruitt Stewart Homestead, where she and her family lived, was added to the National Register of Historic Places.

== Publications ==
- 1914 – Stewart, Elinore Pruitt (1914). Letters of a Woman Homesteader. Houghton Mifflin Co.
- 1915 – Stewart, Elinore Pruitt (1915). Letters on an Elk Hunt, by a Woman Homesteader. Houghton Mifflin Co.
