= Rochester Fringe Festival =

Festival in Rochester, New York, US

- Location: Rochester, New York
- Founded: 2012
- Type of plays: Theatre, comedy, music, dance, spoken word
- Website: www.rochesterfringe.com

The Rochester Fringe Festival, held annually in Rochester, NY since 2012, is one of the three most-attended fringe festivals in the United States. In 2019, the festival attracted more than 100,000 attendees. Held for 12 days in September, the festival features more than 500 performances -- more than a quarter of which are free of charge -- in established venues such as theatres, art galleries and cafes, as well as pop-up, site-specific shows in streets, parking lots, and tents throughout Rochester's East End and Neighborhood of the Arts districts near Downtown Rochester.

== History ==
=== 2012 ===
In its first year -- held September 19–23 -- the First Niagara Rochester Fringe Festival featured more than 180 performances, and attracted more than 33,000 attendees during the course of its five-day run. Headliners included comedian Patton Oswalt, the Harlem Gospel Choir, and aerial dance troupe Bandaloop, which danced on the side of One HSBC Plaza at Manhattan Square Park. Bandaloop's performance was viewed by more than 10,000 people.

=== 2013 ===
The First Niagara Rochester Fringe Festival expanded to 10 days in 2013 -- held September 19–28 -- and drew more than 50,000 attendees to 360 performances at more than 20 venues. Headliners included comedians Marc Maron, Dave Barry, and "Cirque du Fringe," a Cirque du Soleil-type show created for the festival. "Friday on the Fringe" -- a free, outdoor, public event -- again featured a free performance by Bandaloop and was seen by more than 13,000 people. The festival also added a new pop-up venue -- a Spiegeltent -- and curated shows within it, including "Cirque du Fringe" and a headphone-based nightly dance party called "Silent Disco."

=== 2014 ===
The 2014 Fringe -- held September 18–27 -- grew to 60,000 attendees and more than 380 performances. Spiegeltent performances included comedian Jay Pharoah, comedy clowns 20 Penny Circus, a newly created circus show ("Mardi Gras! Cirque du Fringe"), and the return of the popular "Silent Disco." The annual outdoor "Friday on the Fringe" event was held at the newly-renamed Martin Luther King, Jr. Park, and featured a performance by Canada's Circus Orange entitled "Tricycle," specifically designed for the Rochester park's layout and architecture. The festival also included a free outdoor performance of "Spoon River Rochester," based on Edgar Lee Masters' Spoon River Anthology poems, which featured nearly 250 actors in costume throughout Gibbs Street (closed to traffic for the occasion) and an adjoining park.

=== 2015 ===
In 2015, the 10-day First Niagara Rochester Fringe Festival (September 17–26) increased attendance to 63,000, ticket sales by 20%, and featured more than 500 performances. Featured acts included comedian Jamie Lissow (of the sitcom Real Rob), cirque show "Cabinet of Wonders" in the Spiegeltent, and a site-specific, live-art theater experience called "Remote Rochester" created specifically for Rochester by Berlin artists Rimini Protokoll. The free "Friday on the Fringe" event featured a performance by aerial dance troupe Grounded Aerial.

=== 2016 ===
The 2016 Fringe (September 15–25) drew more than 67,000 attendees, and its free "Friday on the Fringe" moved to downtown's empty Parcel 5 and featured Brooklyn's STREB Extreme Action Company. "...The act was a mind-blowing spectacle,” reported Frank DeBlase of CITY Newspaper. "Fringe Street Beat," an all-styles dance competition, made its debut, and the Speigeltent featured the world premiere of "Miracle Cure." "Remote Rochester" returned for its final time with a total sell-out. The Democrat and Chronicle’s Jeff Spevak called Fringe “the thinking person’s entertainment.”

=== 2017 ===
The 2017 festival (September 14–23) was renamed the KeyBank Rochester Fringe Festival, and attracted more than 78,000 attendees. It featured the U.S. premiere tour of France's immersive, inflatable street theatre company, Plasticens Volants at Parcel 5 for both "Friday & Saturday on the Fringe," drawing over 20,000 audience members to two performances of "Big Bang." Emmy Award-winning writer and comedian John Mulaney headlined at Kodak Hall, and the Spiegeltent featured "Cirque du Fringe: Eclectic Attraction," "The Bicycle Men," Silent Disco," "Disco Kids," and "Fringe Afternoon Tea."

=== 2018 ===
The 2018 KeyBank Rochester Fringe Festival (September 12–22) extended from 10 to 11 days, and offered almost 550 events and performances. Now the largest multi-arts festival in New York State, it broke all previous tickets sales and sell-out records. "Friday & Saturday on the Fringe" featured the North American premiere of the U.K.'s Massaoke at Parcel 5, while Kodak Hall hosted comedy headliner, Eddie Izzard.

=== 2019 ===
The 2019 KeyBank Rochester Fringe Festival expanded again to 12 days (September 10–21), breaking records with more than 100,000 attendees and highest ticket sales ever. Plasticens Volants returned with the U.S. premiere of "Pearl: Secrets of the Sea" for "Friday & Saturday on the Fringe," while the expanded "Fringe Finale Weekend" featured the return of Massaoke and its U.S. premiere of "Night at the Musicals" on closing night. Other headliners included comedian Mike Birbiglia and Peabody-nominated podcaster Nate DiMeo, who performed both his "Memory Palace Live" show as well as creating a specially commissioned, site-specific piece at Rochester's High Falls.

=== 2020 ===
The 2020 KeyBank Rochester Fringe Festival (Sept. 15-26) will be a virtual one due to the COVID-19 pandemic and its health and safety risks. The entire lineup of online shows were announced via livestream on August 25 at 10:30 EDT.

== Participation ==
The bifurcated (divided into two branches) festival is partially curated by the Fringe – several headliners and free outdoor events – but the vast majority of the shows are curated by the venues themselves from submissions made by artists. The submission process takes place via the Fringe website (www.rochesterfringe.com) in March and April, and the venues work with the artists directly to create their Fringe line-ups in May and June.

Rochester’s Fringe is an un-juried festival with no selection committee, and therefore any type of performance may participate. Besides "Headliners," most shows usually run an hour or less, technical aspects are kept to a minimum, and ticket prices are low (usually ranging from free to $20).
