= Horse trade =

Horse trade may refer to:

- Horse trading, English term for complex bargaining or exchange
- Vote trading, exchange of favors in voting
- Horse Trade Theater Group, New York, US
