= Libby Skala =

American actress and playwright (1967–2019)

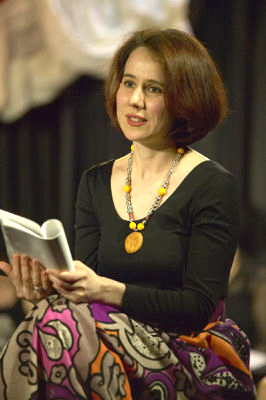
- Libby Skala in 2008
- Born: Elizabeth Anne Skala; April 20, 1967; Englewood, New Jersey, US
- Died: December 1, 2019 (aged 52)
- Education: Oberlin College (BA)
- Occupations: Actress, Playwright
- Spouse: Steven May (m. 2008)
- Relatives: Lilia Skala (grandmother)
- Writing career
- Years active: 1993–2019
- Notable work: Lilia!
- Website: Official website

Elizabeth Anne "Libby" Skala (April 20, 1967 – December 1, 2019) was an American actress and writer best known for plays about her Austrian-American relatives. She wrote four one-woman shows: Lilia!, A Time to Dance, Felicitas, and Irena Sendler: Rescuing the Rescuer, which she performed across North America and Europe.

== Biography ==
=== Early life and education ===
Elizabeth Anne Skala was the eldest daughter of Mary and Martin Skala, a Canadian textile designer and Austrian-born financial writer for The Christian Science Monitor. Her father's mother was Austrian-American actress Lilia Skala. Libby Skala was born in Englewood, New Jersey, and moved to Darien, Connecticut, with her parents and her younger sister Emily when she was nine.

After graduating from Oberlin College (also her father's alma mater) with a degree in English Literature/Theatre Emphasis, and attending cattle calls in New York, Skala moved to Seattle where she earned her union cards and studied with Gary Austin, founder of the improvisational theatre company The Groundlings.

=== Career ===
In 1995, months after her grandmother Lilia Skala's death, Gary Austin encouraged Skala to write a one-woman show about her Academy Award-nominated actress grandmother. The show Lilia! was developed in Austin's workshop and went on to receive rave reviews internationally. It ran successfully off-Broadway at the Arclight Theatre, produced by Mirror Repertory Company; at The Groundlings Theatre in Los Angeles (presented by Gary Austin); at Pacific Theatre in Vancouver; at the Edinburgh Fringe Festival in Scotland; in London, sponsored by the Austrian Cultural Forum; in Tbilisi, Georgia; and in Berlin and Dresden, Germany.

Skala's second play A Time to Dance won "Best Solo Performer Award" at the London Fringe Theatre Festival. It portrays the story of Skala's great-aunt Elizabeth "Lisl" Polk, a pioneer of dance therapy, and is based on a series of interviews recorded while Skala was researching Lilia!. The play toured North America and Europe.

Libby Skala collaborated with her husband, musician Steven May, to create her third show, Felicitas, which was premiered at the New York International Fringe Festival in 2014. May created the mandolin music score which he performs live on stage to underscore Skala's story of her great-aunt, Felicitas Sofer, a highly trained professional baby nurse who migrated from Vienna to join her sisters Lilia and Lisl in the United States. She was the nurse in attendance at Skala's home birth.

Libby Skala's show, Irena Sendler: Rescuing the Rescuer, premiered at the London Fringe Theatre Festival in 2017.

=== Personal life and death ===
Skala married musician Steven May in 2008.

Libby Skala died on December 1, 2019, at the age of 52.

== Honors ==
In 2013, the Sunnyside Gardens Historical Alliance presented Lilia! in conjunction with the unveiling of a National Register of Historic Places Plaque on the former home of Skala's grandmother Lilia Skala, Stage and Screen Actor, for which Sidney Poitier wrote a tribute. A month earlier, Skala performed A Time to Dance for Sunnyside Gardens Historical Alliance in honor of a National Register of Historic Places Plaque unveiling at the home of her great-aunt, dance therapy pioneer Elizabeth "Lisl" Polk.

== Work ==
=== Theatre ===
- 1999 Lilia!
- 2007 A Time to Dance
- 2014 Felicitas
- 2017 Irena Sendler: Rescuing the Rescuer

=== Filmography ===
| Year | Title | Role |
|---|---|---|
| 2000 | Smile | Cindy |
| 2003 | Unscrewed | Mary's Friend |
| 2004 | Birth | Bridesmaid |
