= Rooftop Movies =

Rooftop Movies is Perth's first rooftop cinema, located atop a multi-story carpark in Northbridge, Western Australia.

It is open during Perth's summer months and screens a variety of films from cult classics to recent releases. Artrage produces Rooftop Movies, in partnership with City of Perth Parking.

The pilot program for Rooftop Movies occurred in 2012, with an opening night screening of The Big Lebowski selling out in a matter of minutes. Films are sometimes accompanied by pre and post screening entertainment, such as DJs, bands or live comedy and the program often includes weekly and one-off special events.

In 2012, Rooftop Movies featured a special event screening of Napoleon Dynamite followed by a DJ set by Efren Ramirez who played Pedro Sanchez in the film.

In 2013, Rooftop Movies hosted the Miss Universe Australia WA State Final. The space was also used as a venue for Fringe World Festival 2013.

Rooftop Movies regularly features on the list of the best outdoor cinemas in the world.
