= Why I Stuck A Flare Up My Arse For England =

2023 one-man play by Alex Hill

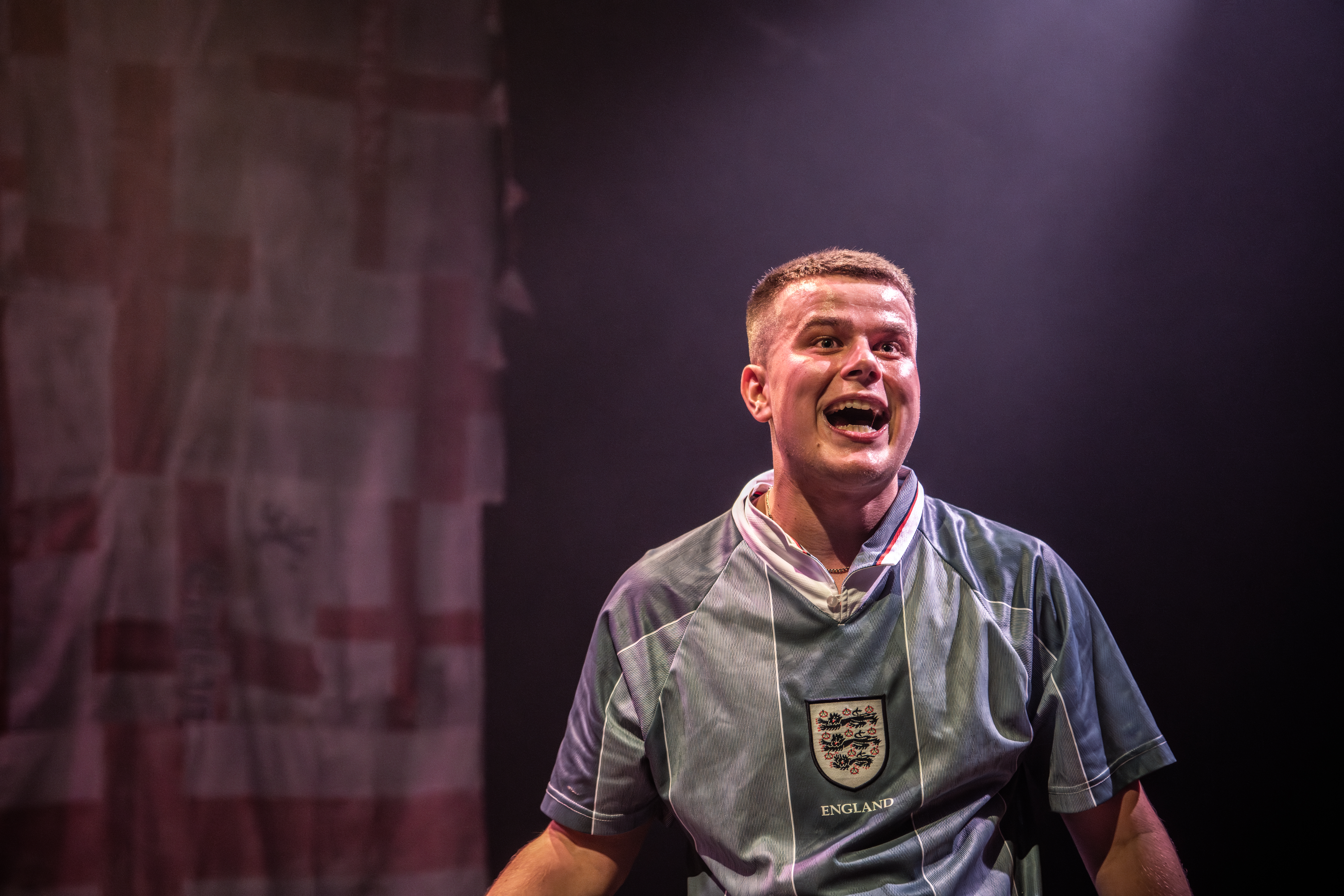
Alex Hill as ‘Billy Kinley’ in Why I Stuck A Flare Up My Arse For England at Southwark Playhouse in 2024. Taken by Rah Petherbridge.

Why I Stuck A Flare Up My Arse For England is a 2023 one-man play written and originally performed by Alex Hill and directed by Sean Turner.

The play first previewed in London in 2023 at The Old Red Lion Pub Theatre in Islington before premiering at the Edinburgh Fringe 2023 where it received an encouraging audience and critical response. The play has also had runs at Southwark Playhouse, The Lowry, Edinburgh Fringe 2024, Wilton's Music Hall and the Adelaide Fringe (after winning The Holden Street Theatre Award at Edinburgh).

At the end of 2025, it was announced by RoxyDog Productions that their production of the play would conclude in July 2026 after a Flarewell Tour that includes dates in Australia (Perth Fringe World & Adelaide Fringe). It was later announced in February 2026 that the play would transfer to London's West End and play a one-off special performance at The Garrick Theatre on Sunday 21 June, before transferring Off-Broadway to SoHO Playhouse for its final ever performances.

Why I Stuck A Flare Up My Arse For England explores English football fan culture with themes of belonging, tribalism and toxic masculinity. Hill used an infamous photo of an England fan named ‘Charlie Perry’ putting a flare between his buttocks in Leicester Square on the day of England's EURO 2020 Final against Italy to imagine the story. Whilst this was the stimulus of the play, the character of ‘Billy Kinley’ depicted on-stage does not have any relation to the fan who went viral in real-life.

Ben Shephard and Chris Kamara lent their voices, playing themselves as radio presenters, for the show's final run at the Edinburgh Fringe in 2025. Their voices also featured at the subsequent runs at Underbelly Boulevard in October 2025, Tjarnarbíó Theater, Iceland in November 2025, and for the Flarewell Tour in 2026.

== Reception ==
The play has received over 50 five and four-star reviews with The Daily Telegraph calling it "compelling" in their own four-star review of the show at the Edinburgh Fringe in 2024.

It has won four awards: the Offie, The Holden Street Theatre Edinburgh Fringe Award and The Best Theatre & Physical Theatre Show at the Adelaide Fringe in 2025 and at Perth Fringe World in 2026.
