= Dirty Blonde =

Dirty Blonde may refer to:

- Dirty blonde, a hair color
- Dirty Blonde (album), 2026 album by Bebe Rexha
- Dirty Blonde: The Diaries of Courtney Love, a 2006 memoir by rock musician and actress Courtney Love
- Dirty Blonde (play), a 2000 play by Claudia Shear

== See also ==
- The Dirty Blondes Theater Company
- Dirtie Blonde
