= Fringe theatre =

Theatre that is experimental in style or subject matter

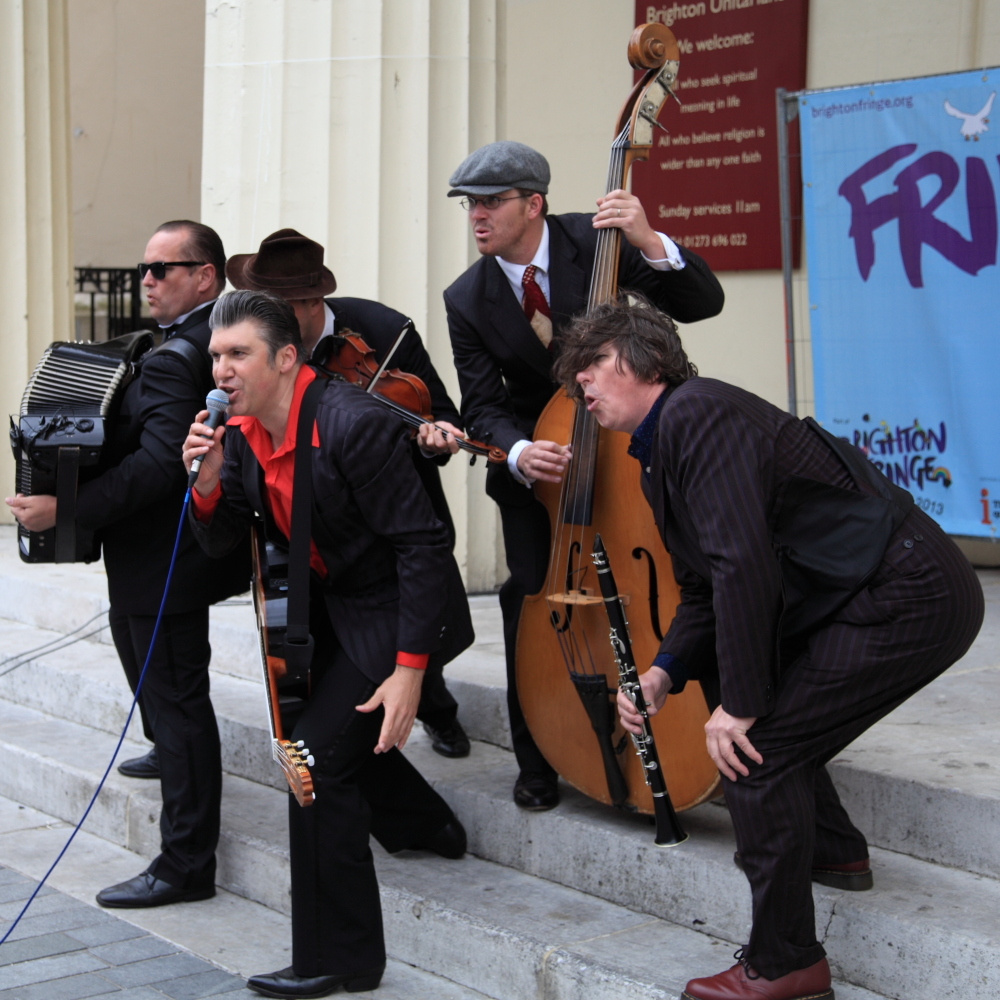
Performers at the 2013 Brighton Fringe Festival

Fringe theatre is theatre that is produced outside of the main theatre institutions, and that is often small-scale and non-traditional in style or subject matter. The term comes from the Edinburgh Festival Fringe. In London, the fringe are small-scale theatres (often referred to as the London Fringe and not included as West End theatres), and the equivalent of off-Broadway and Off-off-Broadway theatres in New York City, as well as Europe's "free theatre" groups.

In unjuried theatre festivals, also known as fringe festivals or open-access festivals, all submissions are accepted, and sometimes the participating acts may be chosen by lottery, in contrast to juried festivals in which acts are selected based on their artistic qualities. Unjuried festivals (such as the Edinburgh Festival Fringe, Edmonton Fringe Festival, Adelaide Fringe, and Fringe World) permit artists to perform a wide variety of works.

== History ==
In 1947, eight theatre companies showed up at the Edinburgh International Festival, hoping to gain recognition from the mass gathering at the festival. In 1948, Robert Kemp, a Scottish journalist and playwright, described the situation, "Round the fringe of official Festival drama, there seems to be more private enterprise than before ... I am afraid some of us are not going to be at home during the evenings!". Edinburgh Festival Fringe was founded under the name "Festival Adjuncts", in 1947.

The fringe movement in Britain has been said to start in the 1960s, similar to the United States' Off-Off-Broadway theatres and Europe's "free theatre" groups. The term came into use in the late 1950s, and the show Beyond the Fringe premiered in Edinburgh in 1960, before transferring to Broadway and is the West End. One of the early innovators in fringe theatre was an American bookseller, James Haynes, who in 1963 created the Traverse Theatre in Edinburgh. Also noted in this period is the La MaMa Experimental Theatre Club, Jerzy Grotowski's Theatre of 13 Rows, and Józef Szajna's Studio Theatre in Warsaw.

The Adelaide Fringe in Adelaide, South Australia, now second-largest annual arts festival in the world (after Edinburgh Fringe), started in 1960 as an adjunct to the main Adelaide Festival of Arts.

Haynes, while at the helm of the Traverse, was receiving state support and even got a new theatre in 1969. In 1969, Haynes created the Arts Lab in London, but it only lasted for two years. Peter Brook along with another American Charles Marowitz opened the Open Space Theatre on Tottenham Court Road in London in 1968. Young British writers, after the May 1968 events in France, wrote agitprop plays, including David Hare, Howard Brenton, David Edgar.

Meanwhile, in the United States, experimental theatre was growing due to the political protest of the Vietnam War. The Living Theatre, founded by Julian Beck, is considered the leader of the "flower power" and "hippie" movement.

By the early 1970s, many fringe theatres began to receive small subsidies. After the 1973–74 stock market crash, many fringe companies were forced to close. New playwrights were established at the Bush Theatre and King's Head Theatre, both of whom survived the crash. 7:84 and Red Ladder Theatre Company were some of the surviving touring fringe groups.

Fringe theatres were attractive to people in the 1960s due to their adventurousness but became less wild in the 1970s while the standards of production rose.

In 1982, the first fringe festival in North America was started in Edmonton, Alberta. It was then a theatre component of the larger Summerfest but evolved to become a stand-alone event, the Edmonton International Fringe Festival, one of the largest annual arts events in Canada and still the largest fringe in North America by attendance. The oldest fringe festival in the United States is Orlando, FL, founded in 1992. There are more fringe festivals in North America than any other continent.

== Festival organization ==
One distinction between fringe festivals and conventional arts festivals is the method used to choose participants. Typically, conventional festivals use a jury selection process, whereas many fringe festivals do not use a jury process in their selection criteria, hence the descriptor unjuried or open-access. There are exceptions to this; some fringe festivals (e.g., New York International Fringe Festival) do employ a jury-based selection process.

All performers are welcome to apply, regardless of their professional or amateur status. No restrictions are made as to the nature, style or theme of the performance, though some festivals have children's areas with appropriate content limitations. Festivals may have too many applicants for the number of available spaces; in this case, applicants are chosen based on an unrelated criterion, such as order of application or a random draw.

The number of performances varies among different fringe festivals. Larger festivals may have thousands of performances (e.g., Edinburgh's 2013 festival had 45,464 performances).

Fringe festivals typically have a common organising group that handles ticketing, scheduling, and some overall promotion (such as a program including all performers). Each production pays a set fee to this group, which usually includes their stage time as well as the organizational elements. The organising group and/or the venues often rely on a large pool of volunteers.

Ticket pricing varies between festivals. At UK fringe festivals, groups can decide their own ticket prices, and some sell tickets at fixed rates in one or two tiers, or in groups of 5 or 10.

Although it is unusual for the organising group to choose any winners of the festival, other organisations often make their own judgements of festival entries . Productions can be reviewed by newspapers or publications specific to the festival, and awards may be given by certain organisations. Awards or favourable reviews can increase the tickets sales of productions or lead to extra dates being added.

== Elements of a typical production ==
The limitations and opportunities that the fringe festival format presents lead to some common features.

Shows are not judged or juried. Depending on the popularity, some fringe festivals may use a lottery system to determine which shows are selected.

Shows are typically technically sparse. They are commonly presented in shared venues, often with shared technicians and limited technical time, so sets and other technical theatre elements are kept simple. Venues may be adapted from other uses.

Casts tend to be smaller than mainstream theatre; since many of the performing groups are traveling, and venues (and thus potential income) tend to be fairly small, expenses must usually be kept to a minimum. One-person shows are therefore quite common at fringe festivals.

Fringe festival productions often showcase new scripts, especially ones on more obscure, edgy, or unusual material. The lack of artistic vetting combined with relatively easy entry make risk-taking more feasible.

While most mainstream theatre shows are two or three acts long, taking two to three hours with intermissions, fringe shows tend to be closer to one-hour, single-act productions. The typically lowered ticket prices of a fringe theatre show permit audiences to attend multiple shows in a single evening.

Performers sometimes billet in the homes of local residents, further reducing their costs.

== List of fringe festivals ==
North America

- Asheville Fringe Festival — Asheville, NC
- Atlanta Fringe Festival — Atlanta, GA
- BorderLight Fringe Festival - Cleveland, OH
- Boulder International Fringe Festival - Boulder, CO
- Calgary Fringe Festival — Calgary, AB
- Capital Fringe Festival — Washington, DC
- Charm City Fringe Festival — Baltimore, MD
- Chicago Fringe Festival — Chicago, IL
- Cincinnati Fringe Festival — Cincinnati, OH
- Denver Fringe Festival — Denver, CO
- Edmonton International Fringe Festival — Edmonton, AB
- Elgin Fringe Festival — Elgin, IL
- FringePVD — Providence, RI
- Halifax Fringe Festival — Halifax, NS
- Hamilton Fringe Festival — Hamilton, ON
- Hollywood Fringe Festival — Los Angeles, CA
- Festival St-Ambroise Fringe de Montréal — Montréal, QC
- Fundy Fringe Festival — Saint John, NB
- Indianapolis Theatre Fringe Festival — Indianapolis, IN
- Island Fringe Festival — Charlottetown, PE
- Kansas City Fringe - Kansas City, MO
- London Fringe Theatre Festival (Ontario) — London, ON
- Maui Fringe Festival — Wailuku, HI
- Minnesota Fringe Festival — Minneapolis, MN
- Mississauga Multilingual Fringe Festival — Mississauga, Ontario, CA
- New York City Fringe (FRIGID New York) — New York, NY
- New York International Fringe Festival — New York, NY
- O'ahu Fringe Festival — Honolulu, HI
- On the Edge Fringe Festival — North Bay, ON
- Orlando International Fringe Theater Festival — Orlando, FL
- Ottawa Fringe Festival — Ottawa, ON
- Philadelphia Fringe Festival - Philadelphia, PA
- PortFringe - Maine’s Fringe Festival - Portland, ME
- Rhinoceros Theater Festival --- Chicago, IL
- Rochester Fringe Festival — Rochester, NY
- Rogue Festival — Fresno, CA
- San Diego International Fringe Festival — San Diego, CA
- San Francisco Fringe Festival — San Francisco, CA
- Saskatoon Fringe Theatre Festival — Saskatoon, SK
- St. Lou Fringe Festival — St. Louis, MO
- Sault Ste. Marie Fringe North International Fringe Festival — Sault Ste. Marie, ON
- Theatre Crude Fringe Festival — Oklahoma City, OK Theatre Crude Fringe Festival | Oklahoma City
- Time-Based Art Festival — Portland, OR
- Toronto Fringe Festival — Toronto, ON
- Tucson Fringe Festival - Tucson, AZ
- Vancouver Fringe Festival — Vancouver, BC
- Victoria Fringe Theatre Festival
- Winnipeg Fringe Theatre Festival — Winnipeg, MB

Europe

- Amsterdam Fringe Festival
- Bath Fringe Festival
- Bergen Fringe Festival - Bergen, Norway
- Brighton Festival Fringe
- Budapest Fringe Festival
- Buffer Fringe Festival, Nicosia, Cyprus
- Buxton Festival Fringe
- Copenhagen Fringe Festival
- Delft Fringe Festival, the Netherlands
- Dublin Fringe Festival
- Durham Fringe Festival
- Edinburgh Festival Fringe
- FringeMi, Milan, Italy
- Reykjavík Fringe Festival, Reykjavík, Iceland
- Lahti Fringe Festival, Lahti, Finland
- Limerick Fringe
- London Festival Fringe
- Ludlow Fringe Festival - Ludlow, England
- Malvern Fringe Festival - Malvern, England
- Oslo Fringe Festival - Oslo, Norway
- Paris Fringe Festival
- Prague Fringe Festival
- Reading Fringe Festival
- Windsor Fringe Festival
- Sibiu Fringe Festival, Romania
- Shaftesbury Fringe Festival
- Southside Fringe Festival - Glasgow, Scotland
- Stockholm Fringe Festival - Stockholm, Sweden
- Trondheim Fringe Festival - Trondheim, Norway
- Gothenburg Fringe Festival - Gothenburg, Sweden
- Fringe by the Sea - North Berwick, East Lothian, Scotland
- Ventnor Fringe - Isle of Wight UK

Asia

- Acco Festival of Alternative Israeli Theatre
- Butterworth Fringe Festival
- Manila Fringe Festival
- M1 Singapore Fringe Festival
- Shenzhen Fringe Festival
- Rainforest Fringe Festival

Australia

- Adelaide Fringe, South Australia
- Anywhere Theatre Festival (Brisbane)
- Fringe World, Perth
- Melbourne Fringe Festival
- The Sydney Fringe
- Electrofringe

New Zealand

- New Zealand Fringe Festival
- Dunedin Fringe Festival
- Nelson Fringe Festival
- Couch Soup Fringe Festival

Africa

- National Arts Festival - Grahamstown, South Africa

== See also ==
- Canadian Association of Fringe Festivals
- Experimental theatre
