= Canadian Association of Fringe Festivals =

The Canadian Association of Fringe Festivals (CAFF) is an international body that promotes and safeguards the ideals and principles of fringe theatre in North America.

== History ==
The 1982 Edmonton International Fringe Festival, modelled after the Edinburgh Festival Fringe, was the first successful instance of Fringe theatre in North America. Based on its success, an informal network of other Canadian and American Fringe festivals arose. Concerned about the growth of festivals that might claim the "Fringe" title without being aligned with the original spirit of Fringe Theatre, festival directors from this network founded the Canadian Association of Fringe Festivals in 1990. The organization was incorporated as a non-profit in 1994. In 1998, CAFF successfully trademarked the terms "Fringe" and "Fringe Festival" in Canada to ensure that any theatre festival wishing to refer to itself as a "Fringe" would agree to abide by both CAFF's guiding principles and the CAFF mandate.

== Principles and Mandate ==
At the time of its formation, CAFF defined four minimum guiding principles for Fringe Festivals:

1. Participants will be selected on a non-juried basis, through a first-come, first served process, a lottery, or other method approved by the Association
2. In order to ensure Criteria One (above), the audiences must have the option to pay a ticket price, 100% of which goes directly to the artists.
3. Fringe Festival producers have no control over the artistic content of each performance. The artistic freedom of the participants is unrestrained.
4. Festivals must provide an easily accessible opportunity for all audiences and all artists to participate in Fringe Festivals.

The mandate of CAFF is as follows:

- To safeguard the integrity of Fringe Festivals as outlined in the four minimum criteria
- To recognize that the health of all member Festivals is important to the Circuit and therefore the artists' health as a whole
- To encourage communication and cooperation between member Festivals thereby fostering the continuity of our guiding principles

== List of member festivals ==
As of October 2023, CAFF consisted of 30 festivals from across North America.

- Calgary Fringe Festival
- Edmonton International Fringe Festival
- Elgin Fringe Festival
- Fringe Fort Meyers
- Fringe North
- FringeMTL (formerly the St-Ambroise Montreal Fringe Festival)
- Fundy Fringe Festival
- Guelph Fringe Festival
- Halifax Fringe Festival
- Hamilton Fringe Festival
- Island Fringe Festival
- Kelowna Fringe Festival
- London Fringe Theatre Festival (Ontario)
- Mississauga Multilingual Fringe Festival
- New York City Fringe (formerly the FRIGID New York Fringe Festival)
- Nogojiwanong Indigenous Fringe Festival
- ON THE EDGE Fringe Festival
- Orlando International Fringe Theater Festival
- Ottawa Fringe Festival
- PortFringe
- Regina International Fringe Festival
- San Diego International Fringe Festival
- San Francisco Fringe Festival
- Saskatoon Fringe Theatre Festival
- Tampa International Fringe Festival
- Theatre Kingston Fringe
- Toronto Fringe Festival
- Vancouver Fringe Festival
- Victoria Fringe Theatre Festival
- Winnipeg Fringe Theatre Festival

== Touring Lottery ==
While individual festivals are mostly programmed independently, CAFF reserves spots in each member festival's lineup for the winners of its annual touring lottery. Winning artists are permitted to enter any of the festivals instead of going through each individual festival's lottery process.

== Activities ==
In 2012, CAFF engaged the Canadian federal government to request a parity negotiation in the treatment of American performers entering Canada and Canadian performers entering the United States.
