= Frigid =

Frigid may refer to

- Cold
- Polar region or frigid zone, one of the two geographical zones of the Earth's surface within the polar circles
- FRIGID New York, an Off-Off-Broadway festival hosted by Horsetrade Theatre
- Hypoactive sexual desire disorder, also called frigidity

== See also ==
- Frijid Pink, an American rock band
