= Carbon, Wyoming =

- Ghost town
- Location within Wyoming
- Coordinates: 41°50′55″N 106°22′37″W
- Country: United States
- State: Wyoming
- County: Carbon
- Elevation: 6,831 ft (2,082 m)
- Time zone: UTC-7 (Mountain (MST))
  - Summer (DST): UTC-6 (MDT)
- Area code: 307
- GNIS feature ID: 1597247

Carbon is a ghost town in Carbon County, Wyoming, United States. It is 9.5 miles (15.3 km) west-southwest of Medicine Bow. The Carbon Cemetery, which is listed on the National Register of Historic Places, is located in Carbon.
