= Terry Sendgraff =

American dancer and choreographer

- Born: October 12, 1933
- Died: September 6, 2019 (aged 85)
- Occupations: Dancer; choreographer

Terry Sendgraff was an American modern dancer and choreographer known as the founder of the Motivity dance method. She is often credited as being the founder of modern aerial dance.

== Biography ==
Sendgraff moved to San Francisco in 1971 and began teaching aerial dance. At that time, an aerial dance scene had not been established on the West Coast. In 1975 she introduced her aerial dance method and performance style, called Motivity, into her classes. During that time she co-founded Skylight Studio in Berkeley, California alongside Ruth Zaporah. She is credited as being the founder of modern aerial dance.

Sendgraff obtained a bachelor's degree in Clinical Psychology from John F. Kennedy University in 1986.

In 1978 she founded Fly By Night, the first women's trapeze dancing troupe in the United States. In 1980 she founded the Motivity Company. In 1991 she founded Women Walking Tall Stilting Troupe, which performed with her as the director until 1994.

Sendgraff was a featured artist and faculty member at the Annual International Aerial Dance Festival in Boulder, Colorado from 1999 until 2005.

She was a recipient of the Isadora Duncan Solo Performance Award in 1989, the Choreographer's Fellowship from the National Endowment of the Arts and the Artists Residencies from the California Arts Council in 1993 and 1994, the Independent Artists Award from Oakland Crafts and Cultural Arts in 1999 and 2001, and the Isadora Duncan Sustained Achievement Award in 2005.

In 2000 she was featured in the documentary Artists in Exile: A Story of Modern Dance in San Francisco.

She is a breast cancer survivor.

She died in 2019 after a long illness.
