= Island Fringe Festival =

Arts and theatre festival in Charlottetown, Prince Edward Island

The Island Fringe Festival is an independent arts and theatre festival that takes place annually in Charlottetown, Prince Edward Island. The Festival was founded by Sarah Segal-Lazar and Megan Stewart in 2012 with the first festival taking place in August of that year. The festival is one of three Fringe Festivals in Atlantic Canada and is a member of the Canadian Association of Fringe Festivals.

== Shows and Venues ==
Fringe Performances take place around the city of Charlottetown in conventional and unconventional spaces, such as in homes, on patios, and in bars. All shows in the festival are by donation, with proceeds going directly to artists. In August 2016, comedian Lorne Elliott debuted his new work, A Better Play Than Hamlet, at the Island Fringe.
