= The Dirty Blondes Theater Company =

- Formation: 2012
- Type: Theatre group
- Location: Brooklyn, New York
- Artistic director: Ashley J. Jacobson
- Website: www.thedirtyblondes.org

The Dirty Blondes Theater Company is a not-for-profit theater group based in Brooklyn, New York. The Dirty Blondes Theater Company is dedicated to developing, producing, and promoting works of female-identified artists, as well as members from other under-represented groups. Currently, Ashley J. Jacobson serves as the artistic director, Elizabeth Sarkady serves as the executive director, and Olivia Baseman as an associate producer.

== Background ==
The Dirty Blondes Theater Company was founded in 2012 by Ashley J. Jacobson and Elizabeth Sarkady. They have produced more than 20 works of new theater including work from over 500 artists. The Dirty Blondes are resident artists at Horse Trade Theater, producing in its celebrated downtown venues Under St. Mark's and The Kraine Theater.

In 2012, the company started Play in a Day Festivals, during which playwrights, directors, and actors come together to create and perform seven short plays in 24 hours.

== Production history ==
Season	Title	Writer and director	Cast	Location	Notes
2016–2017	How to be Safe	By Ashley J. Jacobson, Directed by Cezar Williams	Jenna D'Angelo, Brandon Ferraro, Faith Sandberg	The Kraine Theater	Presented at FRIGID New York at Horse Trade Theater Group in association with The Dirty Blondes
2016–2017	The Resister Project	Peyton Berry, Maggie Bofill, Cat Crowley, Nelson Diaz-Marcano, Esther Ko, Sean Pollock, Ashley Lauren Rogers, Julia Specht, and Ricky Whitcomb	Sehri Alese, Mia Anderson, Fred Backus, Olivia Baseman, Jeanette Bonner, Brandon Ferraro, Lex Friedman, Alexandra Frost, Chantal Gagnon, Tyler Gardella, Shantay Henry, Roy Koshy, Michael Leon, Kerry Logan, Benjamin Manno, Amanda Marika, Maddie McClouskey, Camara McLaughlin, Jazmin Patiño, Michael Perrie Jr., Anna Rock, Kenzie Ross, Bear Spiegel, Tim Torre, Jessie Winograd, Chelsea Wolocko, Marielle Young, and Jarrod Zayas	The Kraine Theater	Presented at FRIGID New York at Horse Trade Theater Group in association with The Dirty Blondes and Rebecca Aparicio
2016–2017	Sex	By Mae West, Directed by Courtney Laine Self	Alan Dronek, Stephen Elrod, Travis Emery, Alexandra Frost, Susannah Jones, and Lauren Riddle	UNDER St. Mark's Playhouse	Presented at FRIGID New York at Horse Trade Theater Group in association with The Dirty Blondes
2015	The American Play	By Ashley J. Jacobson, Directed by Darren Johnston	Michael DeBartolo, Jen Jacob, and John Charles Nagy	The Steve and Marie Sgouros Theatre	Presented at The New York International Fringe Festival, extended Off-Broadway at The SoHo Playhouse
2015	The Britney Project	By Ashley J. Jacobson, Directed by Courtney Laine Self	Laura Bogdanski, Jimmy Dailey, Brett Epstein, and Brandon Ferraro	JACK NYC	
2014	The Tunnel Play	By Ashley J. Jacobson, Directed by Courtney Laine Self	Laura Bogdanski, Dondrie Burnham, Brett Epstein, Ryan Guess, and Chelsea Wolocko	The Kraine Theater	Presented at The New York International Fringe Festival
2014	Detroit, NY	Shawntai Brown, Melissa Clay, David MacGregor, Matrix Theatre Writers' Circle, Mike McGettigan, Micealaya Moses, Maureen Paraventi	Ayomide "Ayo" Akinsanya, Andi Foster, Ryan Guess, Derrick Marshall, Violeta Picayo, Bello Pizzimenti, LaTonia Phipps, Glenn Quentin, Antwon Smallwood, and Chelsea Wolocko	4th Street Theater	Seven ten-minute plays written by Detroit-based playwrights
2014	After the Dance	By Terence Rattigan, Directed by Casey Cleverly	Kerrie Bond, Andrew Colford, Jimmy Dailey, Jeff Dickamore, Katherine C. McDonald, Fabianne Meyer, Michael Rehse, Kelly Riley, Adam Sachs, and Glory Simon	Gemini and Scorpio Loft	Presented by Co-Op Theatre East and The Dirty Blondes
2014	Hallowed Ground	Curated by Ashley J. Jacobson, Directed by Courtney Laine Self	Tim Aslin, Kay Capasso, Brett Epstein, Brandon Ferraro, and Turquoise Olezene	The Brick Theater	
2013	The Miracle Play	By Ashley J. Jacobson, Directed by Clare Hammoor	Remy Bennett, Isabelle Boulton, Gregory Cohan, Whitney Conkling, Jimmy Dailey, Brandon Ferraro, Miranda Kahn, David McCullouch, Lauren Morrow, Turquoise Olezene, and Hannah Wolfe	The Secret Theatre	Co-produced by The Secret Theatre and The Dirty Blondes
2012	The American Play	By Ashley J. Jacobson, Directed by Alexandra Siladi	Brooke Bergen, Susan Bartolme, Jimmy Dailey, Shane Jensen, Cecilia Lynn-Jacobs, Tyler McClain, and Rachel Napoleon	The Bleecker Street Theater	Presented at Planet Connections Theatre Festivity

== Awards ==
The Dirty Blondes Theater Company presented The American Play at the 2015 New York International Fringe Festival. Writer Ashley J. Jacobson won the award for Overall Excellence in Playwriting.

The American Play was also presented at the Planet Connections Theatre Festivity in 2012 where it won Outstanding Overall Production of a New Play, Outstanding Direction, and Outstanding Lighting Design.
