= FRIGID New York Fringe Festival =

Fringe festival in New York

- Nickname: FrigidFest
- Status: Active
- Genre: Fringe theatre
- Date: March (annual)
- Frequency: Annual
- Locations: New York City, United States
- Country: United States
- Years active: 2007–present
- Founders: Horse Trade Theater Group, EXIT Theatre
- Participants: ~250 artists (first year)
- Attendance: ~2,000 (first year)
- Website: Official website

The FRIGID New York Fringe Festival or FrigidFest is an open and uncensored fringe theatre festival founded in March 2007 jointly by New York's Horse Trade Theater Group and San Francisco’s EXIT Theatre. The first year 29 theatre companies (comprising nearly 250 theatre artists from various countries) performed for more than 2,000 people. The artists are paid 100% of their box office.

== See also ==
- New York International Fringe Festival
- List of theatre festivals
