= Heartland (1979 film) =

1979 American film directed by Richard Pearce

- DVD cover
- Directed by: Richard Pearce
- Written by: Beth Ferris; William Kittredge; Elinore Randall Stewart
- Produced by: Beth Ferris; Michael Hausman
- Starring: Conchata Ferrell; Rip Torn; Lilia Skala; Barry Primus; Megan Folsom
- Cinematography: Fred Murphy
- Edited by: Bill Yahraus
- Music by: Charles Gross
- Production companies: Filmhaus; The National Endowment for the Humanities; Wilderness Women
- Distributed by: Levitt-Pickman
- Release date: September 22, 1979
- Running time: 96 minutes
- Country: United States
- Language: English
- Box office: $1.4 million

Heartland is a 1979 American film, directed by Richard Pearce, starring Rip Torn and Conchata Ferrell. The film is a stark depiction of early homestead life in the American West. It is based on a memoir by Elinore Pruitt Stewart, titled Letters of a Woman Homesteader (1914).

== Plot ==
In 1910 Wyoming, Elinor, a widow, and her seven-year old daughter Jerrine travel by train to a remote Wyoming ranch where Elinor has a job working as a housekeeper for Clyde Stewart, a reserved Scottish rancher. The ranch is a lonely place and the only other woman nearby is an elderly German widow, Mrs. Landauer.

After seeing the beauty of the Wyoming countryside, Elinor becomes determined to file a claim; however, she can not afford to build a house on her new land. Clyde agrees to build her a house if she marries him. The new family faces hardship during the winter when they run low on money and hay for the animals. Elinor becomes pregnant and gives birth to a baby boy. However, he dies of a fever several weeks later. By the end of the winter, Clyde has lost half of his herd. Elinor refuses to give up and they decide to stay and rebuild the herd.

== Cast ==
- Rip Torn as Clyde Stewart
- Conchata Ferrell as Elinore Randall Stewart
- Barry Primus as Jack
- Megan Folsom as Jerrine
- Lilia Skala as Mrs. Landauer
- Amy Wright as Clara Jane
- Jerry Hardin as Cattlebuyer
- Mary Boylan as Ma Gillis
- Jeff Boschee as Land Office Agent #1
- Robert Overholzer as Land Office Agent #2
- Bob Sirucek as Dan Byrd
- Marvin Berg as Justice of the Peace
- Gary Voldseth as Cowboy
- Mike Robertson as Cowboy
- Doug Johnson as Cowboy

== Production ==
The film was developed by screenwriter Beth Ferris and executive producer Annick Smith, both of whom had lived in Montana for at least part of their lives. The film was funded in large part by a $682,000 grant by the National Endowment for the Humanities. An initial $80,000 funded script development including interviewing the with the still-living children of the main characters, and reviewing previously unpublished letters. A working title was Burntfork.

Set in southwestern Wyoming, where Stewart homesteaded, the movie was filmed on location in 37 days in Wheatland, Fergus, and Meagher Counties in central Montana. A Montana girl was cast as Jerrine; Megan Folsom helpfully already knew how to milk cows and ride horses. Local ranchers, cowboys, and townspeople appear as background characters. A local rancher provided a "rent-a-herd" of cattle and "spent three sleepless nights with a pregnant heifer in his barn" in anticipation of a crucial calving scene.

The soundtrack features New Orleans clarinetist George Lewis playing the hymn "What a Friend We Have in Jesus."

== Reception ==
Vincent Canby described it in the New York Times as an "unusually accomplished work," and commended production and performances including "the photography by Fred Murphy...very much a part of the film's success."

Donald Barthelme gave Heartland a positive review in The New Yorker, writing, "Ferrell, as Mrs. Stewart, is formidable. There's never a moment when the viewer's belief in her flags, and she brings to difficult scenes...a rigorous authenticity. Rip Torn does not have the advantage of being relatively unknown—you see him and the mind says, 'There's Rip Torn in a big beard'—but he is in good form here, too."

In 1980, the film was featured as a "buried treasure" (a film that received little attention during its initial run) by film critics Roger Ebert and Gene Siskel on an episode of the TV show Sneak Previews (the latter rated the film as one of the best films of 1981).

== Awards ==
In 1980, the film shared the Golden Bear award for Best Film at the 30th Berlin International Film Festival, and one year later on the Top Ten Films from National Board of Review alongside Chariots of Fire and Indiana Jones and the Raiders of the Lost Ark.

== See also ==
- Elinore Pruitt Stewart Homestead, Wyoming, listed on the U.S. National Register of Historic Places
- American Midwest
- Days of Heaven, the 1978 Terrence Malick film similar in content
- Sweet Land, 2003 American independent film with a similar scenario
