= Aerial dance =

Type of dance

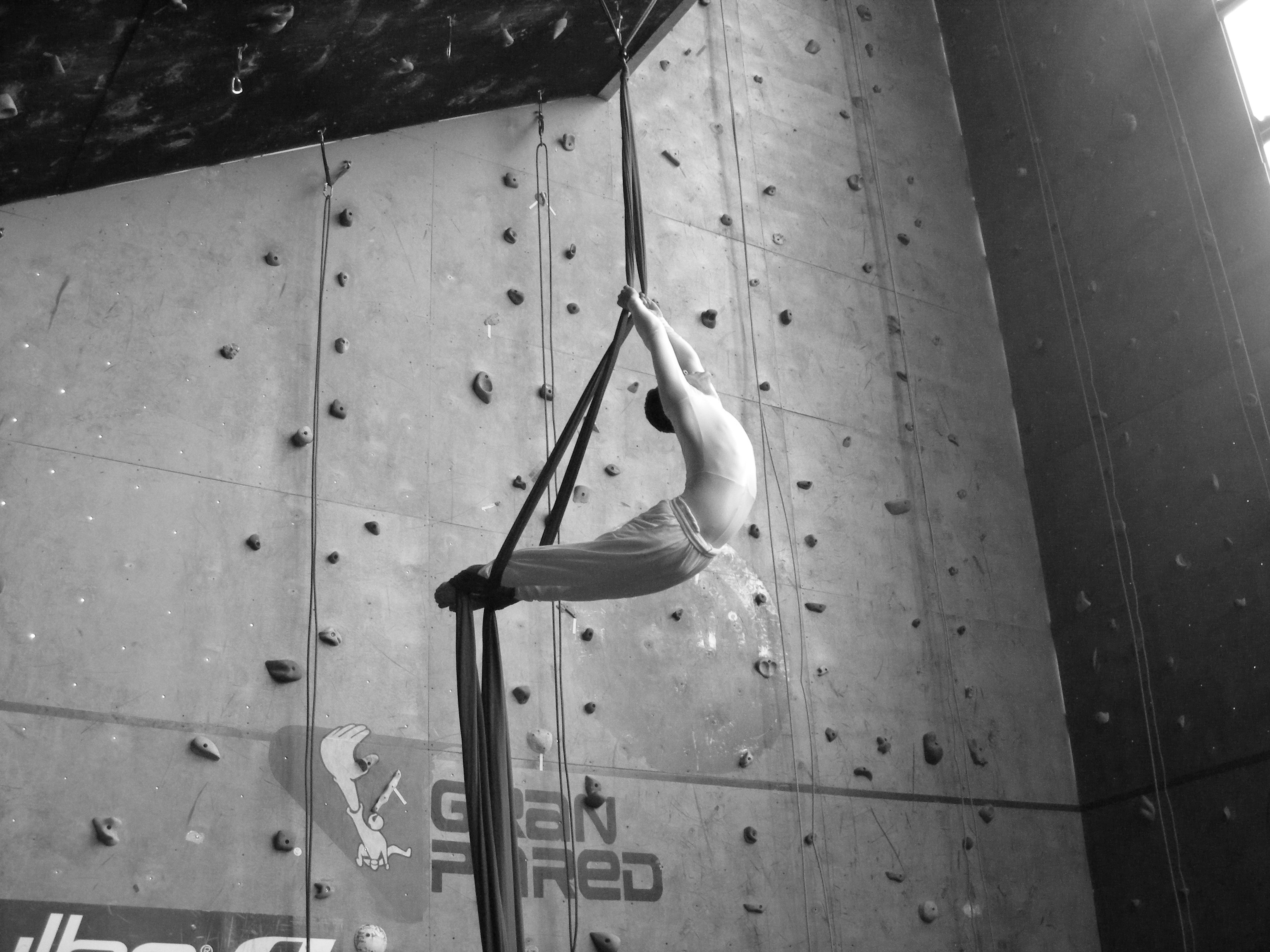
Ivan Torres - Airdancelive Escuela & Cia www.airdancelive.com

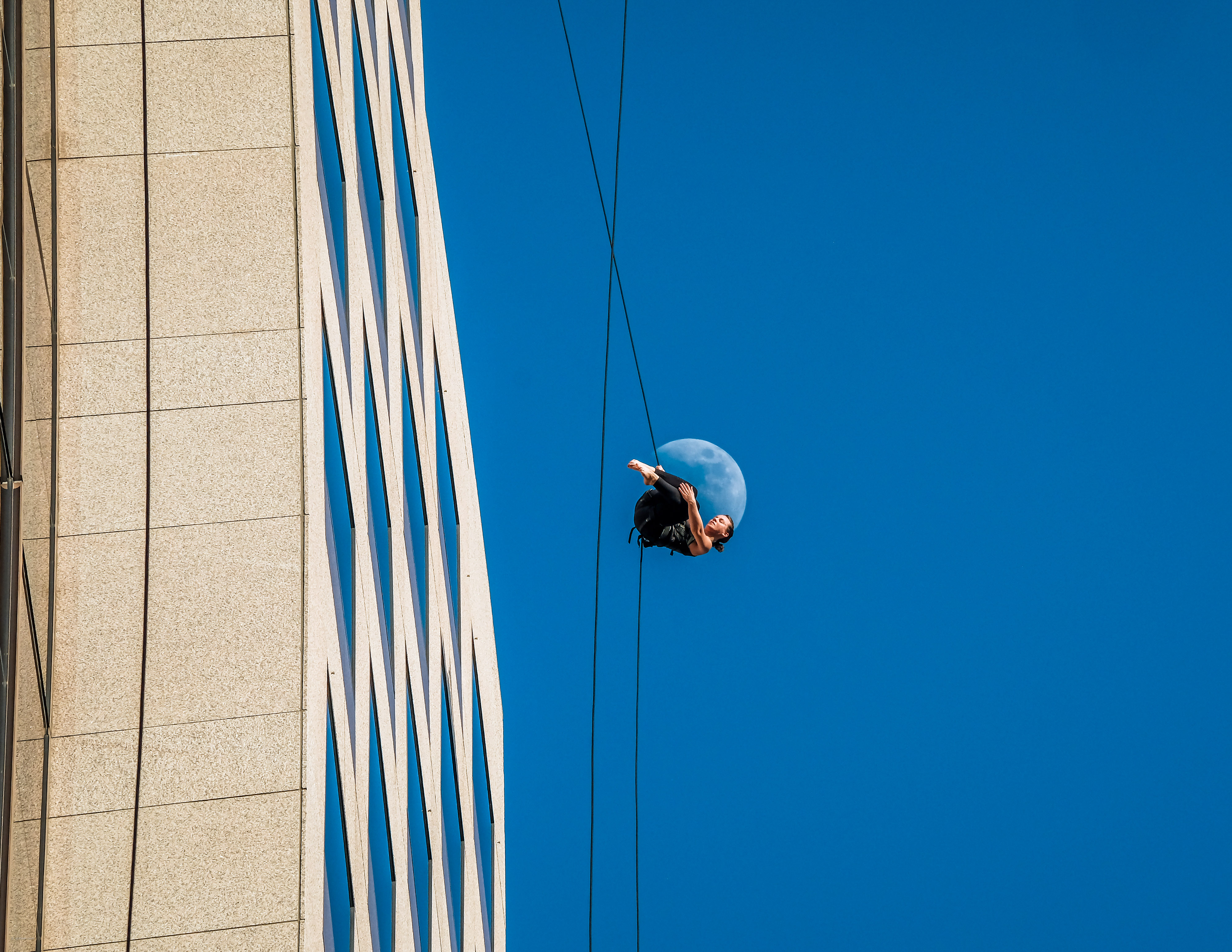
Vertical Dance

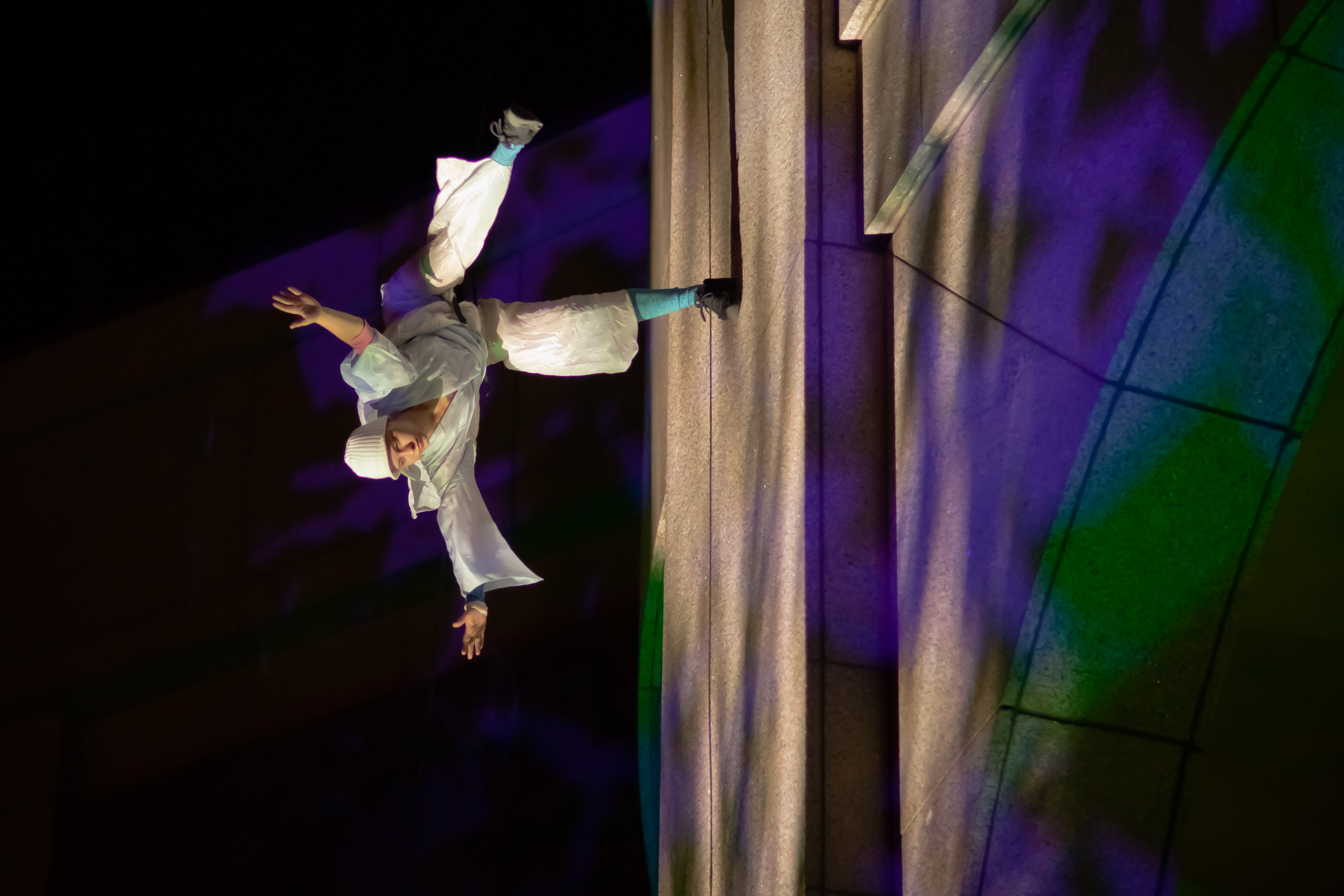
Blue Lapis Light performance at Texas State History Museum

Aerial modern dance is a subgenre of modern dance first recognized in the United States in the 1970s. The choreography incorporates an apparatus that is often attached to the ceiling, allowing performers to explore space in three dimensions. The ability to incorporate vertical, as well as horizontal movement paths, allows for innovations in choreography and movement.

== Overview ==
There are two types of aerial dance. In vertical dance a dancer is suspended in a harness from a rope or cable and explores the difference in gravity, weightlessness and varied movement possibilities offered by the suspended state. In the second type a dancer or acrobat intertwines the use of the floor or a wall with their aerial apparatus. The first utilizes the strength and expression of dance with an altered state to communicate contemporary ideas. In the second, the dancer uses dance as a way to indicate that their work is less trick-based than circus arts, and in some cases hopes that disassociating with the circus makes their work appear more contemporary and artistic.

One of the first choreographers to utilize an aerial dance was Trisha Brown. She called her dances (1968–1971) "equipment pieces". These were not "dancey" pieces, by placing the pedestrians on the side wall, Brown illustrated the choreography of everyday movement.

In the late '90s an Argentinian aerial dance troupe named De La Guarda gained notoriety in London for their show combining performance art with aerial dance. The troupe is no longer touring, but some previous members have started a new company called Cuerda Producciones that continues to create aerial dance theater pieces.

Wanda Moretti of Italy is creating a vertical dance network aimed at collecting knowledge for artists and professionals in the field. Moretti says, "From its beginning 30 years ago, vertical dance evolved from the multiple practices and influences of its initial instigators. It was born from the desire to explore space, environment and become a place where everything was possible."

Aerial modern pieces, whether solo or ensemble, often involve partnering. The apparatus used has its own motion, which changes the way a dancer must move in response. The introduction of a new element changes the dancer's balance, center, and orientation in space. Aerial modern dancers gather annually for workshops in Boulder, Colorado, County Donegal in Ireland, Brittany, in France, and Italy.

Another early influence on aerial modern dance, Terry Sendgraff, is credited with inventing the "motivity" trapeze. Sendgraff actively performed, choreographed and taught in the San Francisco Bay Area from the early 1970s, until announcing her retirement in 2005 at the age of 70, when she handed over her aerial dance business to Cherie Carson. The motivity trapeze came about as a result of an exploration on a low-hung circus trapeze. The ropes twisted together, causing the apparatus to spin. By formalizing this, hooking both ropes to a single point of attachment, Ms. Sendgraff used the apparatus to spin, twist, as well as fly in a straight line and in a circle.

== Workshops ==
In Boulder, Frequent Flyers Productions produces the Aerial Dance Festival which been held every year since its inception in July 1999. Here workshops, performances, and discussions bring together dancers, gymnasts, circus artin Brighton, England every summer.

Portland, Oregon is a unique aerial hub of the United States. Studios such as Afterglow Aerial Arts host Youth Professional Programs that help children and teens prepare aerial dance skills for future work in Cirque du Soleil and circus troupe of the like.

In Italy, an emerging aerial dance company, brought the contemporary dance discipline to a vertical stage. The performance of the company is distinguished from others by the details of the choreography and the harmony of the movement, typical elements of classic dance. Aerial dance is an art form that is incredibly demanding and requires a high degree of strength, power, flexibility, courage, and grace to practice.

Online educational resources and YouTube channels have also emerged as significant platforms for aerial dance training, with some channels reaching tens of thousands of subscribers globally.

== Site dance ==
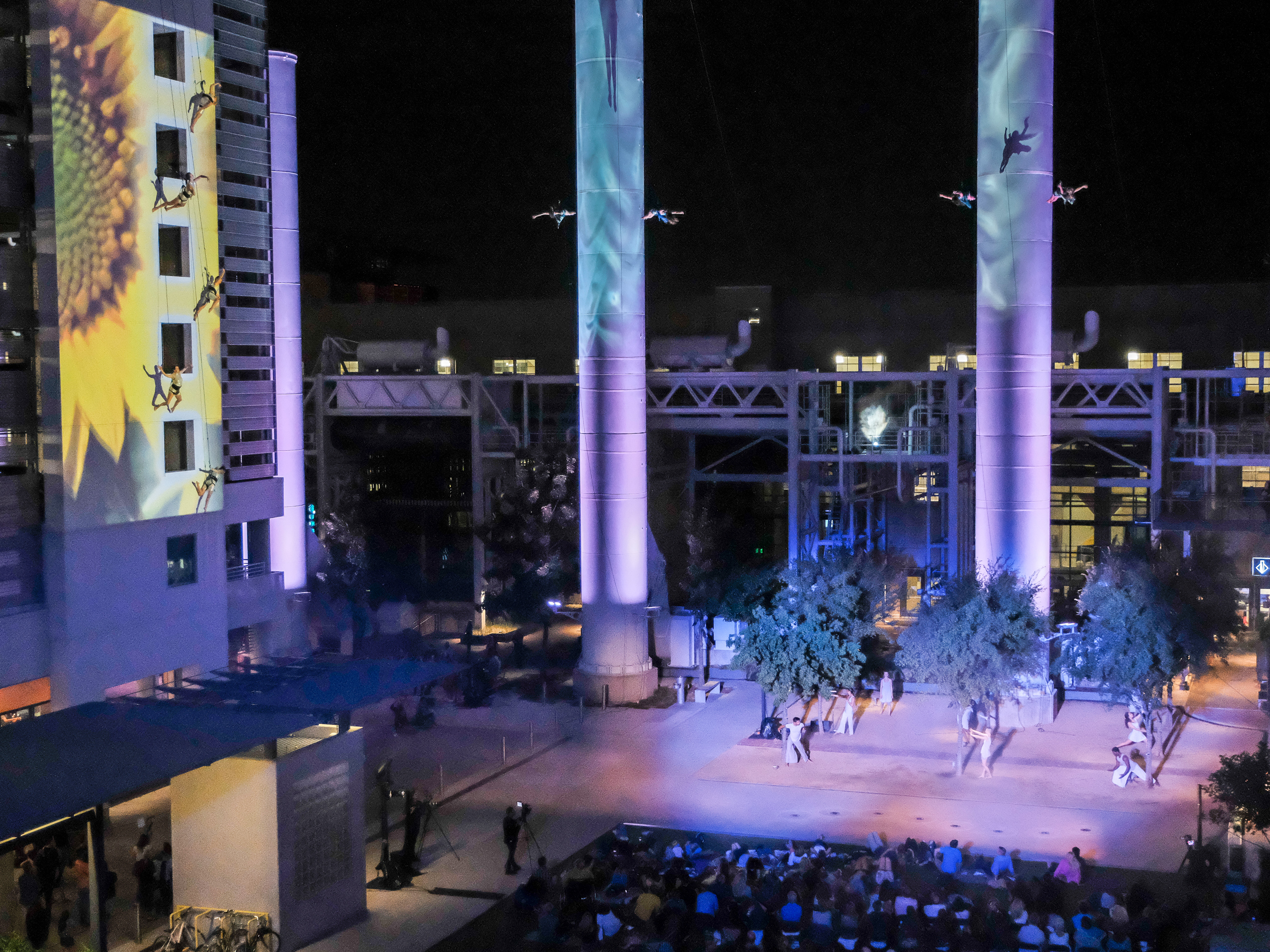
Site Specific Aerial Dance

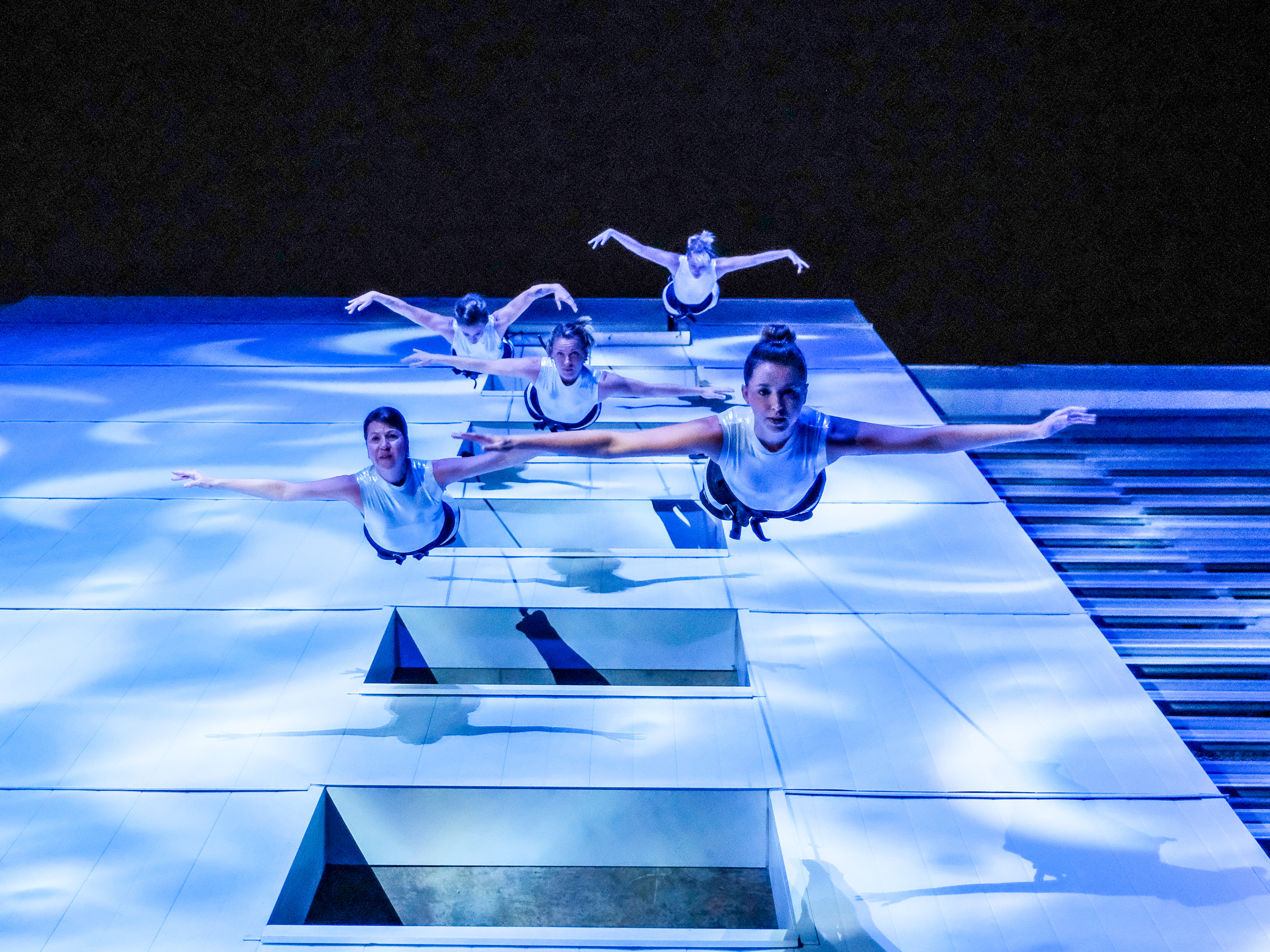
Vertical Dance Performance

Other examples of aerial modern dance are the site-specific works of Joanna Haigood of the Zaccho Dance Theatre, Amelia Rudolph of "Project Bandaloop," and Sally Jacques' Blue Lapis Light. Haigood's work is based on careful research of the history, architecture and societal impact of found spaces, and the translation of these memories into the movements performed in that space. Project Bandaloop combines rock-climbing with dance in performances that scale and/or descend canyons, rock walls, and tall buildings across the world. Video of their outdoor work is sometimes integrated into indoor performances, projected onto screens or trampolines behind the dancers on stage. Blue Lapis Light uses multiple apparatuses, such as aerial silks, harnesses, and bungees to create dances on bridges, office buildings, hotels, and other outdoor spaces.

== See also ==
- Aerial silk
- Modern dance
