= Couch Soup =

Mini-festival of 1-page plays in New Zealand

Couch Soup was a mini-festival of one page plays which started in 1997 and ran annually in Hamilton, New Zealand, and in 2007 in Wellington as part of the New Zealand Fringe Festival. Plays were selected via an open call for scripts, and performed with minimal props, costumes and set (the couch). The format followed in the festivals was around 30 one page plays, performed by four actors (two male, two female), with a run time of approximately an hour.

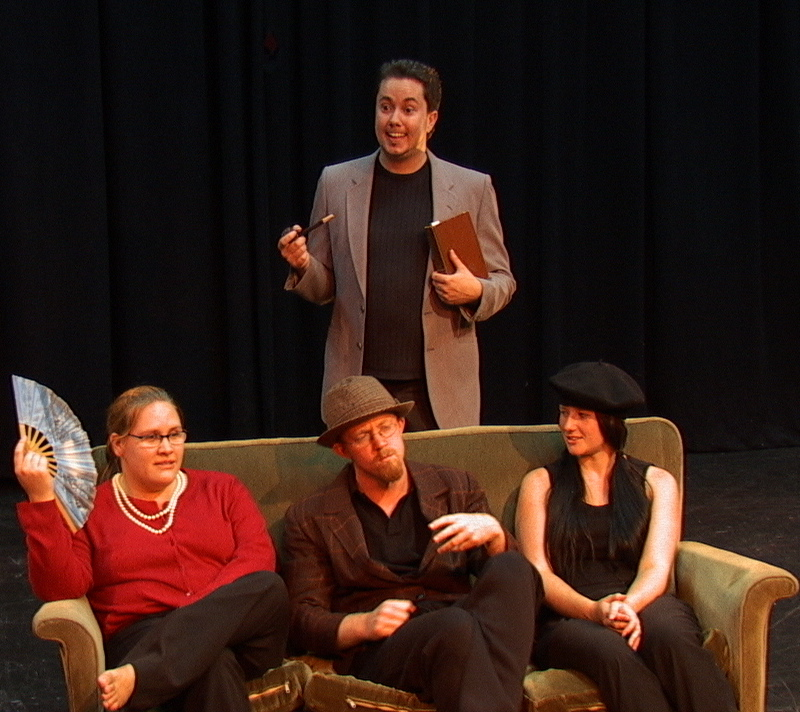
Couch Soup 2005

Though the plays are limited to one side of an A4 page, no restrictions are placed on the format used, and plays may vary from under thirty seconds to over two minutes in length, with the average being around a minute per play. The festival is thus characterized by the demands it places on an actor as much as for its accessibility and vigor .

Because it is difficult to tackle a serious theme completely in the course of a page the plays are commonly absurd, satirical or (rarely) dramas of the kitchen sink variety. Comedic and dramatic monologues as well as homages in the style of a particular writer are also common.

== Playwrights ==
Over a hundred playwrights have participated since 1997, including:

- Mark Prebble - Creator of makemarksmovie.com, through which he sold the Executive Producer credits on his feature debut Futile Attraction to successfully fund its post-production.
- Albert Belz - Acclaimed writer of Awhi Tapu and Te Maunga
- Sarah Peters - Former assistant producer of Auckland Theatre Company's 2nd Unit, now working in the UK.
