= List of cemeteries in Wyoming =

There are at least 161 named cemeteries in Wyoming. This list presents them in alphabetical order by county.

Wyoming /waɪˈoʊmɪŋ/ is a state in the mountain region of the Western United States. Wyoming is the 10th most extensive, but the least populous and the 2nd least densely populated of the 50 United States. The western two thirds of the state is covered mostly with the mountain ranges and rangelands in the foothills of the Eastern Rocky Mountains, while the eastern third of the state is high elevation prairie known as the High Plains.

== Albany County ==
- Green Hill Cemetery, 41°18′59″N 105°34′31″W, el. 7,218 feet (2,200 m)

== Big Horn County ==
- Basin Cemetery, 44°23′14″N 108°03′43″W, el. 4,012 feet (1,223 m)
- Bonanza Cemetery, 44°12′34″N 107°45′04″W, el. 4,160 feet (1,270 m)
- Burlington Cemetery, 44°27′39″N 108°25′14″W, el. 4,436 feet (1,352 m)
- Cowley Cemetery, 44°52′36″N 108°27′13″W, el. 3,976 feet (1,212 m)
- Deaver Cemetery, 44°53′28″N 108°34′24″W, el. 4,101 feet (1,250 m)
- Emblem Cemetery, 44°29′03″N 108°23′25″W, el. 4,478 feet (1,365 m)
- Greybull Cemetery, 44°29′46″N 108°04′24″W, el. 3,858 feet (1,176 m)
- Hyattville Cemetery, 44°15′53″N 107°36′21″W, el. 4,564 feet (1,391 m)
- Kane Cemetery, 44°53′03″N 108°12′34″W, el. 3,665 feet (1,117 m)
- Lovell Cemetery, 44°48′35″N 108°23′18″W, el. 3,911 feet (1,192 m)
- Manderson Cemetery, 44°15′46″N 107°56′54″W, el. 3,937 feet (1,200 m)
- Penrose Cemetery, 44°43′57″N 108°35′08″W, el. 4,170 feet (1,270 m)
- Shell Cemetery, 44°32′17″N 107°47′29″W, el. 4,206 feet (1,282 m)
- Whaley Cemetery, 44°31′49″N 107°51′51″W, el. 4,104 feet (1,251 m)

== Campbell County ==
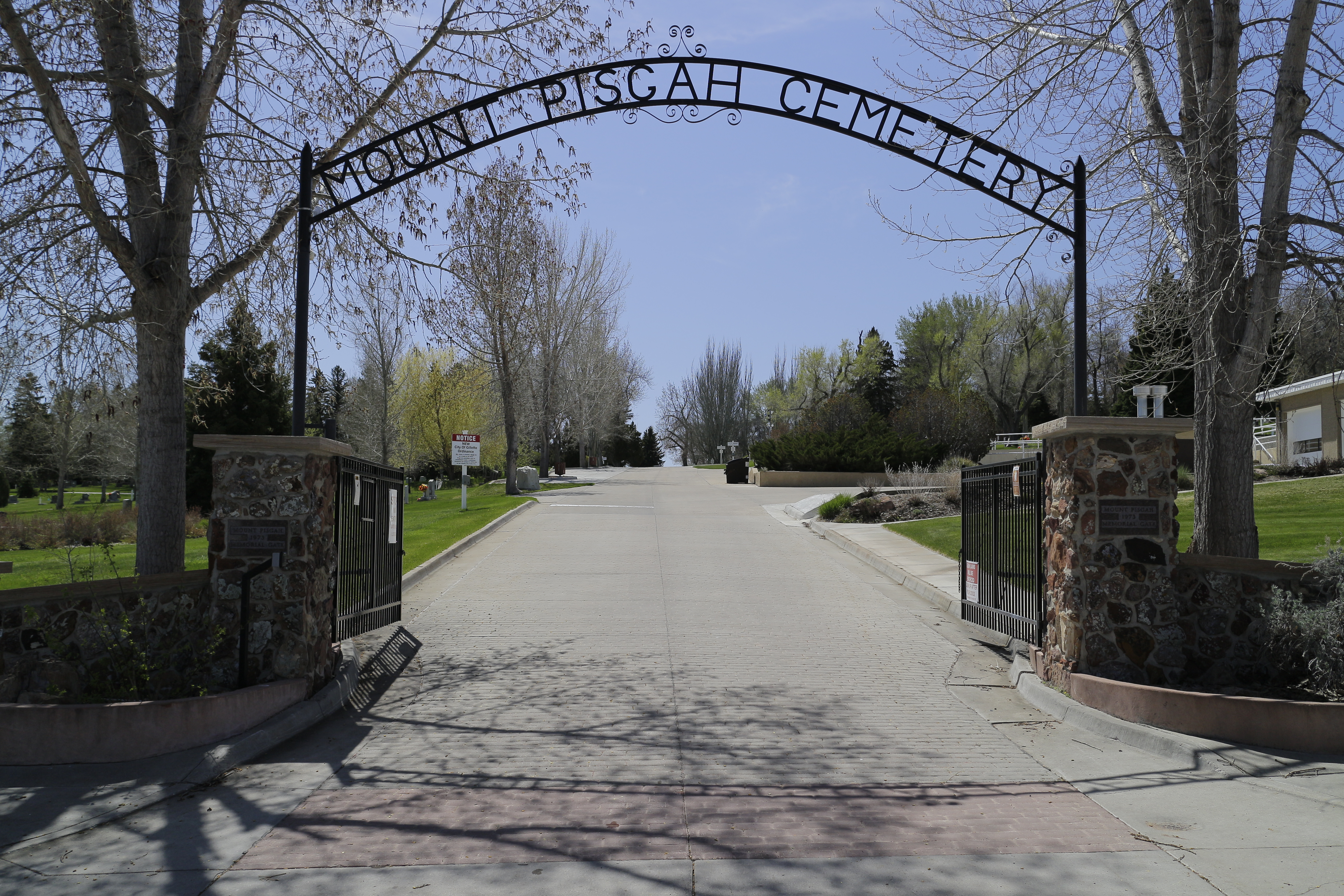
Mount Pisgah Cemetery front gate in Gillette

- Kintz Cemetery, 43°51′43″N 105°17′00″W, el. 4,862 feet (1,482 m)
- Mount Pisgah Cemetery, 44°17′07″N 105°29′55″W, el. 4,610 feet (1,410 m)
- Pleasant Valley Cemetery, 44°22′26″N 105°06′19″W, el. 4,419 feet (1,347 m)

== Carbon County ==
- Baggs Cemetery, 41°02′52″N 107°38′30″W, el. 6,309 feet (1,923 m)
- Baker Cemetery, 41°00′11″N 107°28′56″W, el. 6,529 feet (1,990 m)
- Battle Cemetery, 41°09′41″N 106°58′46″W, el. 9,708 feet (2,959 m)
- Carbon Cemetery, 41°51′07″N 106°22′43″W
- Dunkard Cemetery, 41°13′34″N 106°44′27″W, el. 7,247 feet (2,209 m)
- Elk Mountain Cemetery, 41°42′27″N 106°25′46″W, el. 7,260 feet (2,210 m)
- Encampment Cemetery, 41°12′56″N 106°47′54″W, el. 7,290 feet (2,220 m)
- Eversole Cemetery, 41°02′40″N 107°32′51″W, el. 6,394 feet (1,949 m)
- Pioneer Cemetery, 41°34′24″N 106°57′54″W, el. 6,693 feet (2,040 m)
- Platt Cemetery, 41°10′30″N 106°37′04″W, el. 7,352 feet (2,241 m)
- Rawlins Cemetery, 41°47′49″N 107°14′20″W, el. 6,837 feet (2,084 m)
- Reader Cemetery, 41°01′19″N 107°25′03″W, el. 6,535 feet (1,992 m)

== Converse County ==
- Douglas Cemetery, 42°45′22″N 105°22′32″W, el. 4,905 feet (1,495 m)
- Fort Fetterman Cemetery, 42°50′17″N 105°28′40″W, el. 5,029 feet (1,533 m)
- Grant Cemetery, 42°39′04″N 105°52′08″W, el. 6,611 feet (2,015 m)
- H A Unthank Grave, 42°49′33″N 105°47′21″W, el. 5,033 feet (1,534 m)

== Crook County ==
- Green Mountain Cemetery, 44°23′47″N 104°20′45″W, el. 4,655 feet (1,419 m)
- Greenwood Cemetery, 44°14′08″N 104°29′21″W, el. 4,987 feet (1,520 m)
- Hulett Cemetery, 44°41′44″N 104°35′14″W, el. 3,770 feet (1,150 m)
- Inyan Kara Cemetery, 44°15′41″N 104°18′00″W, el. 5,203 feet (1,586 m)
- Miller Creek Cemetery, 44°27′04″N 104°36′51″W, el. 4,518 feet (1,377 m)
- Moore Hill Cemetery, 44°43′25″N 104°40′25″W, el. 4,547 feet (1,386 m)
- Mount Moriah Cemetery, 44°24′18″N 104°23′41″W, el. 5,010 feet (1,530 m)
- New Haven Cemetery, 44°43′32″N 104°49′29″W, el. 4,455 feet (1,358 m)

== Fremont County ==
- Aragon Cemetery, 43°09′23″N 108°42′27″W, el. 5,387 feet (1,642 m)
- Arapahoe Catholic Cemetery, 42°59′19″N 108°25′00″W, el. 4,944 feet (1,507 m)
- Arapahoe Cemetery, 42°59′32″N 108°26′31″W, el. 5,056 feet (1,541 m)
- Burnaugh Cemetery, 43°17′40″N 108°28′18″W, el. 5,121 feet (1,561 m)
- Chavez Cemetery, 43°12′33″N 108°49′29″W, el. 5,525 feet (1,684 m)
- Collins Cemetery, 43°05′21″N 108°34′20″W, el. 5,203 feet (1,586 m)
- Dubois Cemetery, 43°31′57″N 109°37′37″W, el. 7,044 feet (2,147 m)
- Friday Cemetery, 43°00′27″N 108°47′38″W, el. 5,502 feet (1,677 m)
- Grave of N B Kinnear, 43°10′25″N 108°43′45″W, el. 5,417 feet (1,651 m)
- Hurtado Cemetery, 43°12′47″N 108°49′47″W, el. 5,525 feet (1,684 m)
- Indian Cemetery, 42°59′34″N 108°54′49″W, el. 5,686 feet (1,733 m)
- Lake View Cemetery, 43°14′26″N 108°08′04″W, el. 4,819 feet (1,469 m)
- Le Clair Cemetery, 43°05′55″N 108°38′01″W, el. 5,220 feet (1,590 m)
- Little Popo Agie Cemetery, 42°42′55″N 108°38′45″W, el. 5,525 feet (1,684 m)
- Lost Cabin Cemetery, 43°17′30″N 107°38′08″W, el. 5,466 feet (1,666 m)
- Mount Hope Cemetery, 42°49′39″N 108°42′47″W, el. 5,531 feet (1,686 m)
- Mountain View Cemetery, 43°02′13″N 108°26′14″W, el. 5,207 feet (1,587 m)
- Odd Fellows Cemetery, 43°01′22″N 108°25′15″W, el. 5,007 feet (1,526 m)
- Red Man Cemetery, 43°02′12″N 108°47′49″W, el. 5,423 feet (1,653 m)
- Saint Michael Cemetery, 43°00′43″N 108°46′26″W, el. 5,423 feet (1,653 m)
- Shakespare Cemetery, 43°00′19″N 108°43′24″W, el. 5,400 feet (1,600 m)
- Wallowing Bull Cemetery, 43°02′50″N 108°45′45″W, el. 5,381 feet (1,640 m)
- White Plume Cemetery, 43°02′53″N 108°47′52″W, el. 5,440 feet (1,660 m)
- Willow Cemetery, 43°02′41″N 108°45′07″W, el. 5,407 feet (1,648 m)
- Yellow Calf Cemetery, 43°00′32″N 108°44′41″W, el. 5,430 feet (1,660 m)

== Goshen County ==
- La Grange Cemetery, 41°38′16″N 104°08′47″W, el. 4,715 feet (1,437 m)
- Lingle Cemetery, 42°08′22″N 104°20′16″W, el. 4,190 feet (1,280 m)
- Prairie Center Cemetery, 42°28′38″N 104°12′04″W, el. 4,846 feet (1,477 m)
- Red Cloud Cemetery, 42°22′30″N 104°26′18″W, el. 4,639 feet (1,414 m)
- Valley View Cemetery, 42°08′25″N 104°20′00″W, el. 4,222 feet (1,287 m)
- Valley View Cemetery, 42°04′40″N 104°10′44″W, el. 4,199 feet (1,280 m)

== Hot Springs County ==
- Monument Hill Cemetery, 43°39′32″N 108°13′00″W, el. 4,649 feet (1,417 m)
- Riverside Cemetery, 43°38′09″N 108°13′31″W, el. 4,396 feet (1,340 m)

== Johnson County ==
- Kaycee Cemetery, 43°43′06″N 106°37′12″W, el. 4,783 feet (1,458 m)
- Little Piney Cemetery, 44°32′10″N 106°50′25″W, el. 4,879 feet (1,487 m)
- Morgareidge Cemetery, 43°51′51″N 106°49′33″W, el. 5,426 feet (1,654 m)
- Willow Grove Cemetery, 44°20′02″N 106°42′08″W, el. 4,724 feet (1,440 m)

== Laramie County ==
- Albin Cemetery, 41°25′08″N 104°03′09″W, el. 5,266 feet (1,605 m)
- Beth El Cemetery, Wyoming, 41°08′52″N 104°48′54″W, el. 6,125 feet (1,867 m)
- Burns Cemetery, 41°10′18″N 104°21′29″W, el. 5,433 feet (1,656 m)
- Cheyenne Memorial Gardens, 41°09′42″N 104°42′43″W, el. 6,102 feet (1,860 m)
- Cheyenne National Cemetery
- Lakeview Cemetery, Wyoming, 41°08′38″N 104°48′41″W, el. 6,112 feet (1,863 m)
- Lindbergh Cemetery, 41°18′56″N 104°07′04″W, el. 5,302 feet (1,616 m)
- Little Bear Cemetery, 41°34′05″N 104°56′28″W, el. 6,007 feet (1,831 m)
- Olivet Cemetery, 41°08′51″N 104°48′40″W, el. 6,119 feet (1,865 m)

== Lincoln County ==
- Afton Cemetery, 42°43′04″N 110°55′22″W, el. 6,309 feet (1,923 m)
- Auburn Cemetery, 42°47′01″N 111°00′51″W, el. 6,086 feet (1,855 m)
- Ball Cemetery, 42°42′23″N 110°03′06″W, el. 7,211 feet (2,198 m)
- Bedford Cemetery, 42°53′45″N 110°57′04″W, el. 6,201 feet (1,890 m)
- Cokeville Cemetery, 42°04′55″N 110°56′25″W, el. 6,306 feet (1,922 m)
- Cumberland Cemetery, 41°36′00″N 110°34′45″W, el. 6,657 feet (2,029 m)
- Elizabeth Paul Grave, 42°28′50″N 110°37′43″W, el. 8,215 feet (2,504 m)
- Estella Brown Grave, 42°30′20″N 110°43′19″W, el. 8,379 feet (2,554 m)
- Etna Cemetery, 43°02′29″N 110°58′59″W, el. 6,060 feet (1,850 m)
- Fairview Cemetery, 42°40′55″N 110°59′18″W, el. 6,260 feet (1,910 m)
- Grover Cemetery, 42°47′11″N 110°55′27″W, el. 6,207 feet (1,892 m)
- Hamstork Cemetery, 41°48′02″N 110°34′24″W, el. 7,001 feet (2,134 m)
- Holden Cemetery, 42°06′06″N 110°13′28″W, el. 6,627 feet (2,020 m)
- Nancy Hill Grave, 41°56′12″N 110°43′51″W, el. 7,713 feet (2,351 m)
- Smoot Cemetery, 42°37′16″N 110°54′16″W, el. 6,713 feet (2,046 m)
- Thayne Cemetery, 42°54′53″N 110°59′20″W, el. 6,043 feet (1,842 m)

== Natrona County ==
- Freeland Cemetery, 42°39′01″N 106°23′47″W, el. 6,037 feet (1,840 m)
- Highland Cemetery, Wyoming, 42°50′37″N 106°18′18″W, el. 5,200 feet (1,600 m)
- Midwest Cemetery, 43°25′04″N 106°20′26″W, el. 4,954 feet (1,510 m)
- Natrona Memorial Gardens, 42°52′59″N 106°26′18″W, el. 5,302 feet (1,616 m)

== Niobrara County ==
- Dellview Cemetery, 42°46′09″N 104°36′22″W, el. 5,266 feet (1,605 m)
- Jireh Cemetery, 42°46′41″N 104°43′07″W, el. 5,377 feet (1,639 m)
- Lusk Cemetery, 42°46′20″N 104°27′08″W, el. 5,069 feet (1,545 m)
- Mother Featherlegs Cemetery, 42°37′34″N 104°31′52″W, el. 5,420 feet (1,650 m)
- Pleasant Ridge Pioneer Cemetery, 42°49′52″N 104°05′34″W, el. 5,013 feet (1,528 m)
- Prairie View Cemetery, 42°42′39″N 104°52′43″W, el. 5,111 feet (1,558 m)
- Reynolds Cemetery, 42°44′31″N 104°28′28″W, el. 5,079 feet (1,548 m)

== Park County ==
- Clark Cemetery, 44°54′03″N 109°10′09″W, el. 4,281 feet (1,305 m)
- Crown Hill Cemetery, Wyoming, 44°45′04″N 108°42′41″W, el. 4,416 feet (1,346 m)
- Riverside Cemetery, 44°31′08″N 109°05′04″W, el. 5,033 feet (1,534 m)

== Platte County ==
- Dwyer Cemetery, 42°14′01″N 104°56′45″W, el. 4,823 feet (1,470 m)
- Horseshoe Cemetery, 42°28′38″N 105°03′17″W, el. 4,692 feet (1,430 m)
- Lucindy Rollins Grave, 42°15′38″N 104°45′07″W, el. 4,347 feet (1,325 m)
- Wheatland Cemetery, 42°02′21″N 104°57′38″W, el. 4,819 feet (1,469 m)

== Sheridan County ==
- Arvada Cemetery, 44°38′59″N 106°06′47″W, el. 3,704 feet (1,129 m)
- Big Horn Cemetery, 44°40′26″N 106°58′18″W, el. 4,170 feet (1,270 m)
- Monarch Cemetery, 44°53′49″N 107°00′48″W, el. 3,711 feet (1,131 m)
- Mount Hope Cemetery, 44°47′07″N 106°58′15″W, el. 3,904 feet (1,190 m)

== Sublette County ==
- Bondurant Cemetery, 43°12′46″N 110°24′31″W, el. 6,604 feet (2,013 m)
- Boulder Cemetery, 42°45′16″N 109°43′46″W, el. 7,047 feet (2,148 m)
- Cottonwood Cemetery, 42°47′52″N 110°16′23″W, el. 7,464 feet (2,275 m)
- Indian Graves, 42°59′28″N 109°55′22″W, el. 7,648 feet (2,331 m)
- Mount Olivet Cemetery, 42°51′59″N 110°02′37″W, el. 7,300 feet (2,200 m)
- Plainview Cemetery, 42°52′25″N 109°51′18″W, el. 7,277 feet (2,218 m)
- Plainview Cemetery, 42°30′29″N 110°11′26″W, el. 7,126 feet (2,172 m)
- Tie Camp Cemetery, 43°14′53″N 110°01′11″W, el. 7,730 feet (2,360 m)
- Vible Cemetery, 42°41′33″N 109°42′56″W, el. 6,985 feet (2,129 m)
- Wilhelm Cemetery, 42°55′16″N 110°09′21″W, el. 7,316 feet (2,230 m)

== Sweetwater County ==
- Anderson Cemetery, 41°00′15″N 107°18′04″W, el. 6,640 feet (2,020 m)
- Burntfork Cemetery, 41°02′17″N 109°59′26″W, el. 7,054 feet (2,150 m)
- Eden Valley Cemetery, 42°06′13″N 109°26′50″W, el. 6,585 feet (2,007 m)
- McKinnon Cemetery, 41°01′12″N 109°53′21″W, el. 7,139 feet (2,176 m)
- McKinnon Cemetery, 41°01′48″N 109°57′09″W, el. 7,126 feet (2,172 m)
- Mountain View Cemetery, 41°34′40″N 109°12′45″W, el. 6,378 feet (1,944 m)
- Riverview Cemetery, 41°32′01″N 109°27′28″W, el. 6,352 feet (1,936 m)
- Whitman Cemetery, 42°01′06″N 110°03′12″W, el. 6,417 feet (1,956 m)
- Widdop Cemetery, 41°01′06″N 110°00′43″W, el. 7,251 feet (2,210 m)

== Teton County ==
- Allen Cemetery, 43°52′6.1″N 110°34′2.8″W, el. 6,832 feet (2,082 m)
- Aspen Hill Cemetery, 43°28′18″N 110°45′28″W, el. 6,361 feet (1,939 m)
- Elliott Cemetery, 43°29′41″N 110°52′56″W, el. 6,309 feet (1,923 m)
- Moran Cemetery, see Allen Cemetery

== Uinta County ==
- Almy Cemetery, 41°20′49″N 111°00′20″W, el. 6,575 feet (2,004 m)
- City Cemetery, 41°16′46″N 110°57′36″W, el. 6,732 feet (2,052 m)
- Evanston Cemetery, 41°16′50″N 110°57′36″W, el. 6,732 feet (2,052 m)
- Fort Bridger Cemetery, 41°18′11″N 110°23′05″W, el. 6,765 feet (2,062 m)
- Johnson Cemetery, 41°10′29″N 110°26′45″W, el. 7,392 feet (2,253 m)
- Lonetree Cemetery, 41°02′17″N 110°07′53″W, el. 7,628 feet (2,325 m)
- Millburne Cemetery, 41°16′51″N 110°24′48″W, el. 6,890 feet (2,100 m)
- Spring Valley Cemetery, 41°15′11″N 110°40′41″W, el. 6,998 feet (2,133 m)

== Washakie County ==
- Riverview Memorial Gardens, 44°01′20″N 107°58′29″W, el. 4,094 feet (1,248 m)

== Weston County ==
- Boyd Cemetery, 44°04′39″N 104°07′11″W, el. 5,991 feet (1,826 m)
- Cambria Cemetery, 43°57′16″N 104°12′50″W, el. 5,505 feet (1,678 m)
- Green Mountain Cemetery, 44°09′53″N 104°14′25″W, el. 5,531 feet (1,686 m)
- Greenwood Cemetery, 43°51′07″N 104°11′42″W, el. 4,413 feet (1,345 m)
- Greenwood Cemetery, 44°05′22″N 104°36′50″W, el. 4,255 feet (1,297 m)
