= Lilia Skala =

American actress (1896–1994)

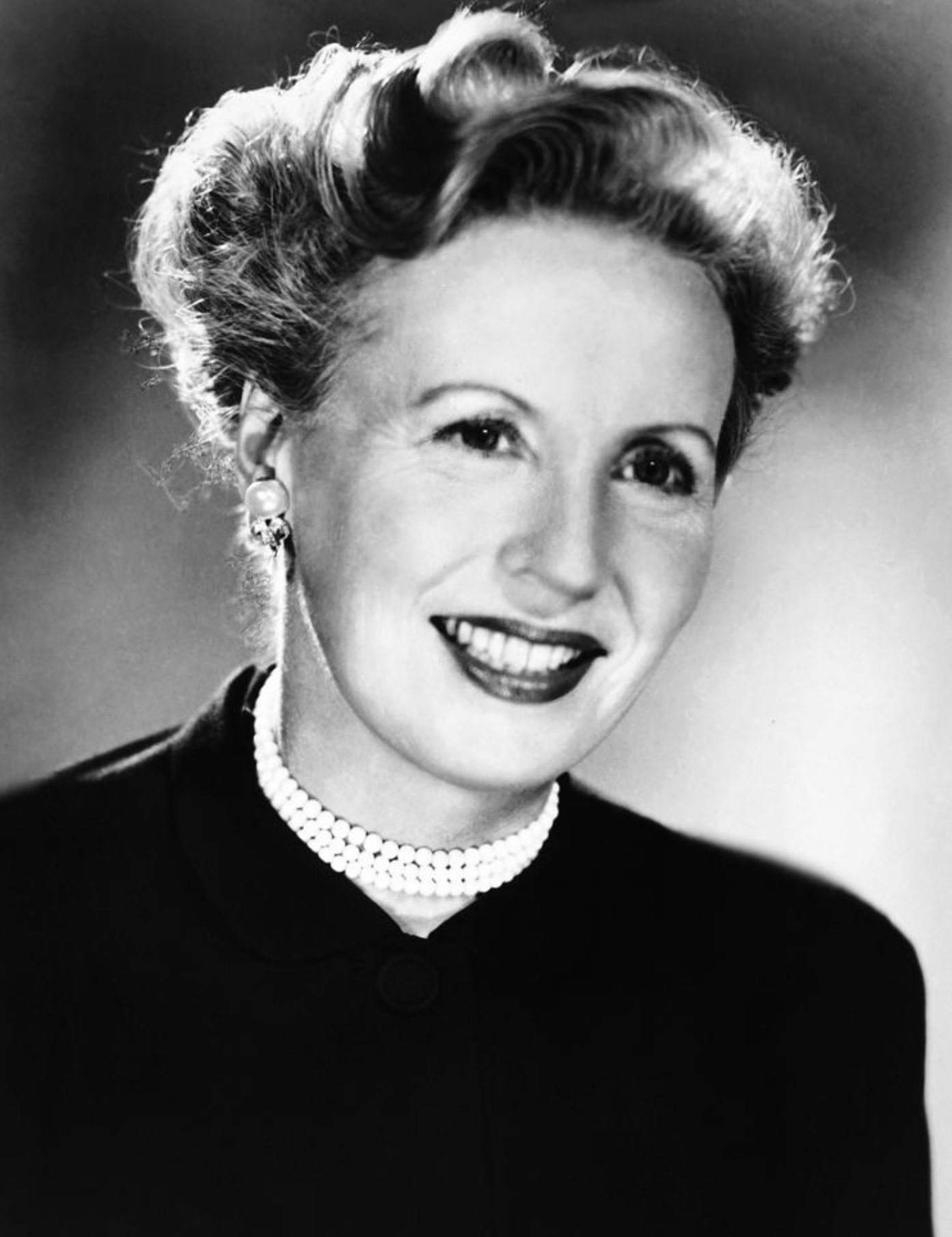
- Skala in 1952
- Born: Lilia Sofer; 28 November 1896; Vienna, Austria-Hungary
- Died: 18 December 1994 (aged 98); Bay Shore, New York, U.S.
- Resting place: Lakeview Cemetery; New Canaan, Connecticut, U.S.
- Education: Technische Hochschule Dresden
- Occupations: Architect; Actress
- Years active: 1931–1990
- Spouse: Louis Erich Skala (m. 1922; died 1980)
- Children: 2

Lilia Skala (née Sofer; 28 November 1896 – 18 December 1994) was an Austrian and American architect and actress known for her role in the film Lilies of the Field (1963), for which she received critical acclaim and an Academy Award nomination. During her career, Skala was also nominated for two Golden Globe Awards and a Primetime Emmy Award.

Before Skala decided to be an actress, she practiced architecture as a profession. She was one of the first women architects in Austria and was the first female member of the Austrian Association of Engineers and Architects. She graduated from the University of Dresden Summa cum Laude; the institution is now known as the Technical University of Dresden, located in Germany.

Her life was the subject of the eponymous one-woman play Lilia!, written and performed by her granddaughter Libby Skala.

== Early life and education ==
Skala was born Lilia Sofer in Vienna. Her mother, Katharina Skala, was Roman Catholic, and her father, Julius Sofer, was Jewish and worked as a manufacturer's representative for the Waldes Koh-i-noor Company. She was one of the first women to graduate in architecture and engineering from the University of Dresden, then practiced architecture professionally in Vienna.

In the late 1930s, she was forced to flee her Nazi-occupied homeland with her husband, Louis Erich Skala, and their two young sons. (Lilia and Erich adopted the non-Jewish sounding surname of Lilia's mother.) Skala and her husband managed to escape (at different times) from Austria and eventually settled in the United States.

== Career ==
According to a short memoir by Skala's son Peter, Skala developed an interest in theatre when she was 14 or 15 years old. However, Skala's parents were conservative and preferred Skala to pursue a career that was more "respectable". At that time, women were not allowed to study at the University of Vienna, so Skala's parents had to send her to the TU of Dresden in Germany. Although it is unclear why Skala choose to study architecture, she excelled in the field and graduated Summa cum Laude. Skala returned to Vienna and continued to practice architecture after the completion of her undergraduate degree.

About a year after the birth of Skala's son, she enrolled in acting lessons and renewed her interest in theatre. As her creative talents unfurled, Skala appeared in television shows and serials from 1952 to 1985, such as The Alfred Hitchcock Hour in 1965. As Grand Duchess Sophie, Skala kept company on Broadway with Ethel Merman in Call Me Madam, not too many years after toiling in a Queens, New York zipper factory as a non-English-speaking refugee from Austria. She played Lisa Douglas’s mother, the Countess, on Green Acres in the 1960s.

She was nominated as Best Supporting Actress for her most famous role as the Mother Superior in 1963's Lilies of the Field. Skala also appeared in Ship of Fools (1965), Charly (1968), Deadly Hero (1976), Eleanor and Franklin (1976), Roseland (1977), Heartland (1979) Flashdance (1983), and House of Games (1987).

== Death and legacy ==
Skala died in 1994 in Bay Shore, New York of natural causes at age 98. A collection of architectural drawings that she had made as an architecture student at the University of Dresden from 1915 to 1920 was donated to the International Archives of Women in Architecture by her sons, Peter and Martin Skala. The collection was part of Skala's belongings when she fled the Nazis in 1939.

== Personal life ==
Skala was a Christian Scientist. She was introduced to the religion in Vienna in the 1920s.

== Filmography ==
Film
Year	Title	Role	Notes
1931	Purpur und Waschblau	Leonore von Cadour - Hofdame der Fürstin	
1931	Man braucht kein Geld		Uncredited
1933	Madame wünscht keine Kinder		Uncredited
1936	Girls' Dormitory	Fräulein Hell	
1936	Flores de Nice		
1937	Unentschuldigte Stunde		
1953	Call Me Madam	Grand Duchess Sophie	
1963	Lilies of the Field	Mother Maria	
1965	Ship of Fools	Frau Hutten	
1967	Caprice	Madame Piasco	
1968	Charly	Dr. Anna Straus	
1976	Deadly Hero	Mrs. Broderick	
1977	Roseland	Rosa (The Peabody)	
1979	Heartland	Mrs. Landauer	
1981	The End of August	Mlle. Reisz	
1983	Flashdance	Hanna Long	
1983	Testament	Fania	
1987	House of Games	Dr. Littauer	
1990	Men of Respect	Lucia	
