= Capital Fringe Festival =

Fringe festival in Washington, D.C.

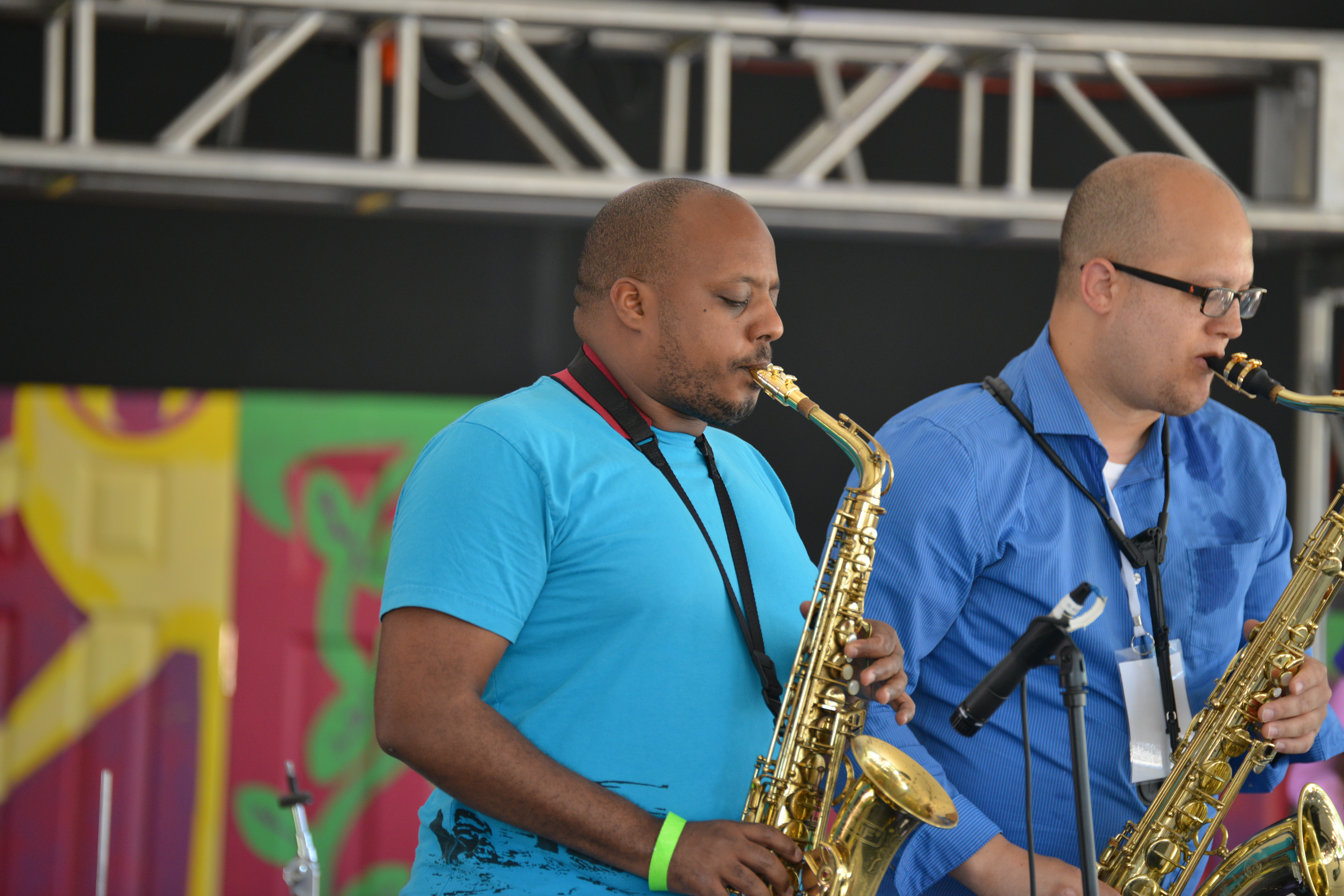
Capital Fringe Music Festival 2016

The Capital Fringe Festival was a fringe theatre festival held in Washington, DC, United States, every July from 2005 to 2019, and then again from 2022 to 2024.

== History ==
The Capital Fringe Festival was first held on July 20–30, 2006. Founded by Julianne Brienza, Mike Geske, Colin Hovde, Scot McKenzie, Nyree Neil, William D. Parker, Charles Phaneuf and Damian Sinclair, the festival was in the spirit of other Fringe festivals worldwide to provide a stripped down platform for artists to perform their works for adventurous audiences. The first festival took place in 28 venues all over downtown Washington, D.C. The festival grounds were located in the Penn Quarter Neighborhood and the eleven day event featured 90 arts groups in almost 400 performances. The first year's festival sold almost 20,000 tickets and 100 performances were completely sold out.

The second year's festival took place in 2007 and expanded performances to 120 arts groups and close to 500 performances. That year the festival won the 2007 Mayor’s Arts Awards for Innovation. The festival continued to grow in 2008 by expanding to 18 days of performances with 120 performing arts groups.

Over the years the festival has won several awards including the 2011 Mayor’s Arts Award for Service in the Arts and the 2013 Helen Hayes Award for Innovative Leadership in the Theatre Community. It has added additional programming such as fallFRINGE, Fringe Curated Series, and Duck Pond Music.

In 2015, the festival moved from downtown to NE DC. It celebrated ten years in operation and Mayor Muriel Bowser awarded Fringe’s Founding Director, Julianne Brienza, the Mayor’s Arts Award for Visionary Leader and the Washington Business Journal awarded our Founding Director Non-Profit CEO of the Year.

In 2018 the festival moved to SW DC and began the Fringe Curated Series. The Series included five curated works at the center of the festival. These pieces were performed in Washington D.C., Arena Stage. The Fringe commissioned the five works asking for them to be myth-driven. The five pieces included: O Monsters by New Paradise Laboratories, The City of... by Matthew Capodicasa, Baracoco by Happenstance Theatre, America's Wives by Farah Lawal Harris, and Andromeda Breaks by Stephen Spotswood.

In 2020 the festival was cancelled and they formed a partnership with the Caandor Labs and Friends of Kenilworth Aquatic Gardens. This led to launching the Down to Earth paid artist residency. In 2021, instead of running the Fringe festival, the Fringe ran the four 13-week visual art Down to Earth Residency. Each artist received $10,000 for their residency period. The program concluded with an in person gallery show at the Honfleur Gallery in April 2022. Fringe also launched Duck Pond Music. This is a free outdoor concert series to create earning opportunities for local DMV musicians.

But 2020 was not kind to the Fringe and the festival had to sell off their headquarters in 2021 and revamp their plans for building out their space and curating year-round programming. They did not hold a festival in 2021, but returned in 2022 in a much smaller capacity. Due to high rent increases the Fringe moved the festival to Georgetown. The 2022 festival featured 30 performing groups over two weekends in July.

In 2025, Capital Fringe announced that it would no longer produce the annual Capital Fringe Festival, Washington, D.C.'s only open-access fringe festival, citing the lack of sustainable venues and rising costs. The organization continues its mission through artist support initiatives, including annual artist award.

== References and external links ==
- Official website
- Something for Everyone: Solo Works, Dance Pieces, Cabaret, Plays and More Populate First D.C. Fringe Fest (Playbill)
- DC's Capital Fringe to Welcome My Friend Hitler, Carrie Potter and the Half Blood Prom, Feminazi and More (Playbill)
- From Bee Man to Wiener Sausage, Capital Fringe Fest Begins July 10 in DC (Playbill)
- Fringe and Purge (Washington City Paper)
- The Washington Festival With the Fringe on Top (Washington Post)
- Washington Post Guide to the 2008 Capital Fringe Festival
