= Artrage (Western Australia) =

Not-for-profit charitable arts organisation in Perth, Western Australia

Coordinates: 31°56′52″S 115°51′15″E

Artrage is Western Australia's longest-running charitable not-for-profit arts organisation. Based in Perth, it originated as an alternative to the Perth International Arts Festival in 1983. Since then, Artrage has evolved into a production company supporting contemporary culture in Western Australia, and produces Rooftop Movies, Girls School, and the annual multi-arts fringe festival Fringe World.
