= Elinore Pruitt Stewart Homestead =

Historic house in Wyoming, United States

- U.S. National Register of Historic Places
- Location within Wyoming Location within the United States
- Location: Off Wyoming Highway 414
- Nearest city: McKinnon, Wyoming
- Coordinates: 41°00′44″N 109°59′35″W
- Area: 5.5 acres (2.2 ha)
- Built: 1898
- Built by: Clyde Stewart
- NRHP reference No.: 85000871
- Added to NRHP: April 25, 1985

The Elinore Pruitt Stewart Homestead, near McKinnon, Wyoming, United States, has significance dating to 1898. Also known as the Elinore and Clyde Stewart Homestead, it was listed on the National Register of Historic Places in 1985.

It is significant for representing "the long overlooked role of women homesteaders in the American West" and for its association with Elinore Pruitt Stewart's book, Letters of a Woman Homesteader, which was a basis for the 1979 film Heartland. Elinore Pruitt Rupert, the author-to-be, arrived in Wyoming in 1909 and filed for homestead property before marrying Mr. Stewart, whose own homestead filing was close by. The homestead house on the property consists of a c.1898 log cabin and c.1909 additions.
