= Allen Cemetery =

Cemetery in Teton County, Wyoming, US

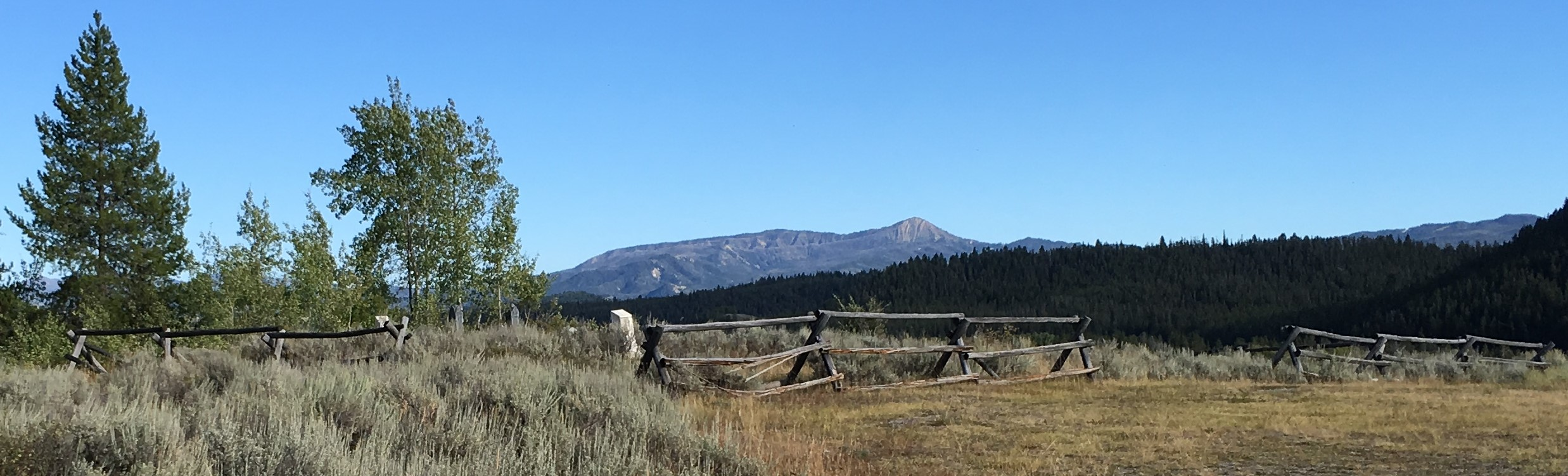
- Interactive map of Allen Cemetery

Details
- Established: 1904
- Location: Grand Teton National Park
- Coordinates: 43°52′6.1″N 110°34′2.8″W
- Type: Family
- Owned by: The National Park Service
- Size: 3 acres
- No. of graves: 37
- Find a Grave: Allen Cemetery

The Allen Cemetery is located in the Grand Teton National Park. It is called the Moran Cemetery by the National Park Service (NPS) and the USGS, and sometimes is referred to as the Old Moran Cemetery due to its proximity to the prior location of the town of Moran. The actual coordinates vary based on the documentation used due to a lack of a street address and deteriorating boundaries of the cemetery.

== History ==
The cemetery is located near the old site of the town of Moran, on what was the old Allen homestead. Charles Joshua Allen and Maria Houston Lish Allen were some of the original homesteaders in the area.

In 1904, their son Andrew was thrown from his horse and died from his injuries. He was buried on their homestead. In 1913, their son Neal fell from his horse and drowned in the Snake River. He was buried next to Andrew. Their two graves and others became known as the Allen Cemetery.

Most of the burials are related to Charles and Maria. Some close friends and neighbors were also buried here. The transfer of the cemetery ownership to the government restricted the right of burial in the cemetery only to descendants of C.J. Allen. The NPS may not have always adhered to that obligation.

The actual number of internments and grave markers is not clear, with a slight variation between sources.

In 1958, the cemetery was sold to the Grand Teton National Park.

In the early 1960s, the cemetery was removed from public view when U.S. Highway 287 (aka North Park Road), which used to pass by the cemetery, was moved South, and with the eventual elimination of surrounding buildings. Vehicular access is not available to the cemetery although a rugged dirt path, which is what became of Old U.S. Highway 287, passes nearby.

== Notable burials ==
- Charles Joshua Allen (1853–1937), established the Elk Horn Hotel in Moran
- Maria Houston-Lish Allen (1857–1942), established and ran the Moran Post Office and in doing so, named the town of Moran
- Albert William Nelson (1912–1970), Teton County Commissioner and Jackson Hole Councilman

== See also ==
- List of cemeteries in Wyoming
