= Fringe World =

Multi-arts festival in Perth, Western Australia

Coordinates: 34.92343°S 138.59565°E

- Genre: Arts festival
- Frequency: Annual
- Locations: Perth, Western Australia
- Years active: 2011–present
- Previous event: 21 January 2026 – 15 February 2026
- Organiser: Artrage
- Website: fringeworld.com.au

Fringe World, or Fringe World Festival, is an annual multi-arts fringe festival held in Perth, Western Australia during the city's summer festival season of January/February. The annual program of events features artists and acts from a range of styles including circus, cabaret, comedy, music, dance, theatre, film and visual art.

== History ==
=== 1983–2011 ===
The Festival Fringe Society of Perth was established in 1983 and was the forerunner to the Fringe World Festival. The Society held an annual Fringe Festival up until 1988 at which time the organisation decided to move the Fringe from summer to spring and to re-brand it as Artrage, an annual festival dedicated to the presentation of alternative independent arts – a format that was followed until the organisation's 25th "Silver" festival anniversary in 2008. Shortly after this time Artrage began consulting with stakeholders and the wider arts community in Perth around the idea of reintroducing a genuine independent "fringe" to the Perth summer. This led to the presentation of a pilot Fringe program in February 2011, staged in the newly purchased De Parel Spiegeltent in the Perth Cultural Centre. The pilot Festival featured 23 events at six venues and there were 12,000 tickets sold.

=== 2012 ===
The 2012 Festival was the first full Fringe World Festival, held from 26 January to 19 February. The Festival presented over 200 events running across 40 traditional and non-traditional venues in Perth.

=== 2013 ===
The 2013 Festival extended one week more than in 2012 and was held from 25 January to 24 February. Ticketed attendance at the 2013 Festival was over 120,000 and the program featured more than 300 events at more than 60 venues. The total free and ticketed attendance was over 215,000 and over $2 million was spent at the box office. The majority of events in the 2011–2013 Fringe World Festivals were held in Northbridge and the Perth CBD, but more specifically at several pop-up performance venues (including De Parel Spiegeltent) in the Perth Cultural Centre.

=== 2014 ===
In 2014 Fringe World revealed that it would be expanding its presence in Northbridge with another site of venues to be held in Russell Square, Perth, which would be transformed into The Pleasure Garden for the Festival's duration. The 2014 Festival was held from 24 January to 23 February and featured 1,788 participating artists, 418 free and ticketed events, 80 venues, free and ticketed attendance of over 370,000 and box office sales of over $3.2 million.

=== 2015 ===
The 2015 Fringe World Festival was held from 23 January to 22 February and was billed as "31 Days of Perthect", featuring a program of more than 500 events at over 100 venues throughout the Perth metropolitan area. The 2015 Festival featured The Gold Digger, a new custom-designed pop-up venue in the State Theatre Centre of Western Australia courtyard, that presented a program of Australian and international comedy talent as part of the Fringe Comedy Central program. The Gold Digger was presented by the Perth Theatre Trust as part of a long-term collaboration with Fringe World.

=== 2016 ===
The 2016 Fringe World Festival was held from 22 January to 21 February. A new feature to the Festival was the Fringe World Fairground, which was part of the opening celebrations of the new waterside precinct, Elizabeth Quay. A 1920s fairground on Perth's waterfront called "Uglieland" was an inspiration for the Fringe World Fairground.

=== 2017 ===
The 2017 Fringe World Festival was held from 20 January to 19 February, during which time the Festival expanded into a new venue at Cathedral Square in Perth, where the Edith Spiegeltent hosted La Soirée.

=== 2019 ===
The 2019 Fringe World Festival took place across 169 venues and performance spaces and was held from 18 January to 17 February 2019. The festival introduced Yagan Square as a new Fringe World hub, Fringe Fridays and Fringe Sundays. The festival generated $12.1 million in box office sales. Total attendance of free and ticketed events was over 850,000 across 5561 performances.

=== 2020 ===
2020 Fringe World was held from 17 January to 16 February 2020. A total of 722 events were held in over 150 venues and performance spaces. The festival introduced Girls School as a new Fringe World hub. The festival generated an economic impact of over $100 million and generated $10.9 million in box office sales, created 2,214 jobs. Total attendance of free and ticketed events was over 829,000 across 6,765 performances.

=== 2021 ===
The 2021 festival was held from 15 January to 14 February 2021. It was the first major fringe performance opportunity in the world for artists during the COVID-19 pandemic. Fringe World launched an app in place of a printed guide for the 2021 Festival. Due to a COVID-19 lockdown, the Festival closed for a week and subsequently hosted an encore season from 14 February to 28 February 2021. The Festival generated an economic impact of $19.9 million and generated $5.9 million in box office sales. Total attendance across free and ticketed events was over 465,000.

In June 2021, the Festival dropped Woodside as a principal sponsor and festival hub naming rights holder due to pressure from activist groups. However, Woodside became a sponsor of Artrage itself until the organisation cut all ties in 2024.

=== 2022 ===
The 2022 Festival featured more than 400 shows in 100 venues, with Fringe World receiving additional government support due to the impact of COVID-19 and the border closures.

=== 2023 ===
Fringe World 2023 featured 550 events across over 100 venues from 20 January to 19 February 2023. The festival generated over $8.7 million in box office sales. Total attendance at free and ticketed events was over 564,000.

=== 2024 ===
The 2024 Fringe World Festival took place from 19 January to 18 February 2024. It had 592,000 attendees, 554 events and earned $10.22 million in box office revenue.

=== 2025 ===
The 2025 Fringe World Festival took place between 17 January and 16 February 2025. It had 492,369 attendees, 570 events and earned $10.78 million in box office revenue. For the 2025 festival, Artrage reduced the number of free events due to growing infrastructure costs.

=== 2026 ===
The 2026 Fringe World Festival took place between 21 January and 15 February 2026. It featured over 600 shows across more than 100 venues.

== Regional touring ==
Fringe World has been touring to regional Western Australia since 2012.

With support from Fringe World partner Woodside, De Parel Spiegeltent has toured to Karratha several times since 2012 to present shows at the Red Earth Arts Festival. Also with support from Woodside, Fringe World has toured artists to the Shinju Matsuri Festival in Broome.

The 2016 regional tour was self-funded by Artrage and visited Esperance, Kalgoorlie, Ravensthorpe, Northam and Mullewa.

== Venues ==
Fringe World events are presented at venues in the Perth metropolitan area and further afield in Western Australia. The Festival hubs (clusters of venues) are located in Northbridge at Perth Cultural Centre, the Pleasure Garden at Russell Square, Perth and Liberty Fringe in the old Liberty Theatre on Barrack Street. Festival events are also presented in independent venues and programs.

== World Fringe Alliance ==
Fringe World is part of the World Fringe Alliance alongside other key fringe festivals including:

- Adelaide Fringe
- Brighton Festival Fringe
- Edinburgh Festival Fringe
- New York International Fringe Festival
- Edmonton International Fringe Festival
- Hollywood Fringe Festival
- Prague Fringe Festival
- National Arts Festival
