= BANDALOOP =

Aerial dance company

Bandaloop, formerly Project Bandaloop and stylized as BANDALOOP, is an aerial dance company founded in 1991 by Amelia Rudolph. The company's incorporation of climbing technology allows dancers to execute routines on vertical surfaces and perform in public spaces.

== Background ==
It is currently under the artistic direction of Melecio Estrella and is based in West Oakland, California. The group's mission statement aims to "honor nature, community, and the human spirit through perspective-bending dance."

Rudolph attended University of California, Berkeley, where she studied contact improvisation dance and had also recently begun rock climbing. She combined the two disciplines, leading to the founding of Bandaloop. The development of the Grigri in the early 1990s, and its ability to control and limit a climber's fall distance, made it possible for dancers to move their hands freely while in climbing harnesses.

== Public performance ==
Bandaloop has performed on both manmade and natural structures. Locations include rock faces in the Sierra Nevada Mountains, the Space Needle in Seattle, Washington, a decommissioned crane in Kirkenes, Norway, the Vasco da Gama Tower in Lisbon, Portugal, and the fortified citadel of Golconda in Hyderabad, India.

Instead of starting with a performance site, the company will often scout areas with a high amount of pedestrian traffic to find a potential audience. The team will then choose a suitable structure on which it can perform. Dance sequences can range from two to 15 minute long. PA systems are used to play music and allow directors to communicate with dancers from the ground. Safety managers and "riggers" remain on standby to assist performers in distress or in the event of equipment failure.

== Film and media ==
In the 2018 IMAX film America's Musical Journey, Bandaloop dancers performed on the Hall Arts building in the Dallas Arts District. In the same year, Bandaloop collaborated with GoPro to release a short film about the dance company's 2017 performance at the Café Budapest Contemporary Arts Festival. The company also performed the dance Crossing for a short film entitled Shift, directed by Rudolph and Rachael Lincoln.

In 2021, the documentary short Fly Away with BANDALOOP profiled the dance company, as well as its preparations for a performance in Atlanta, Georgia. The public performance was commissioned by Flux Projects to promote tourism and local interest in Atlanta's history.

== See also ==
- Aerial Dance
