= London Fringe Theatre Festival (Ontario) =

Fringe festival in Ontario

The London Fringe Theatre Festival is a Canadian annual fringe theatre and related arts festival in London, Ontario. It is credited with triggering a resurgence in local playwriting and performance after the University of Western Ontario cancelled its drama program.

The first festival was presented in 2000, comprising 28 local, national, and international productions over a ten-day schedule. Prior to 2009 it began on the province's Civic holiday weekend, but was moved to the beginning of June to take advantage of the east-to-west circuit of the Canadian Association of Fringe Festivals. By 2019, under the direction of executive producer and co-founder Kathy Navackas, the festival had grown to host over 50 productions and workshops.

The London Fringe Festival organization also sponsored and supported theatre- and arts-related events throughout the year, including a Nuit Blanche event and The Lost Soul Stroll, a historical ghost tour.

In 2020 the organization joined with London Community Players to form the Palace Theatre Arts Commons. After dismissing Navackas and its other staff, the Palace Theatre presented a small "Fringe Binge" festival in September 2021 featuring only three productions, chosen from local companies, and four curated musical acts. The festival was not held in 2026, citing "the global pandemic [and the need to rebuild] trust, capacity, and community".
