= Carbon Cemetery =

Ghost town graveyard in Wyoming, US

- U.S. National Register of Historic Places
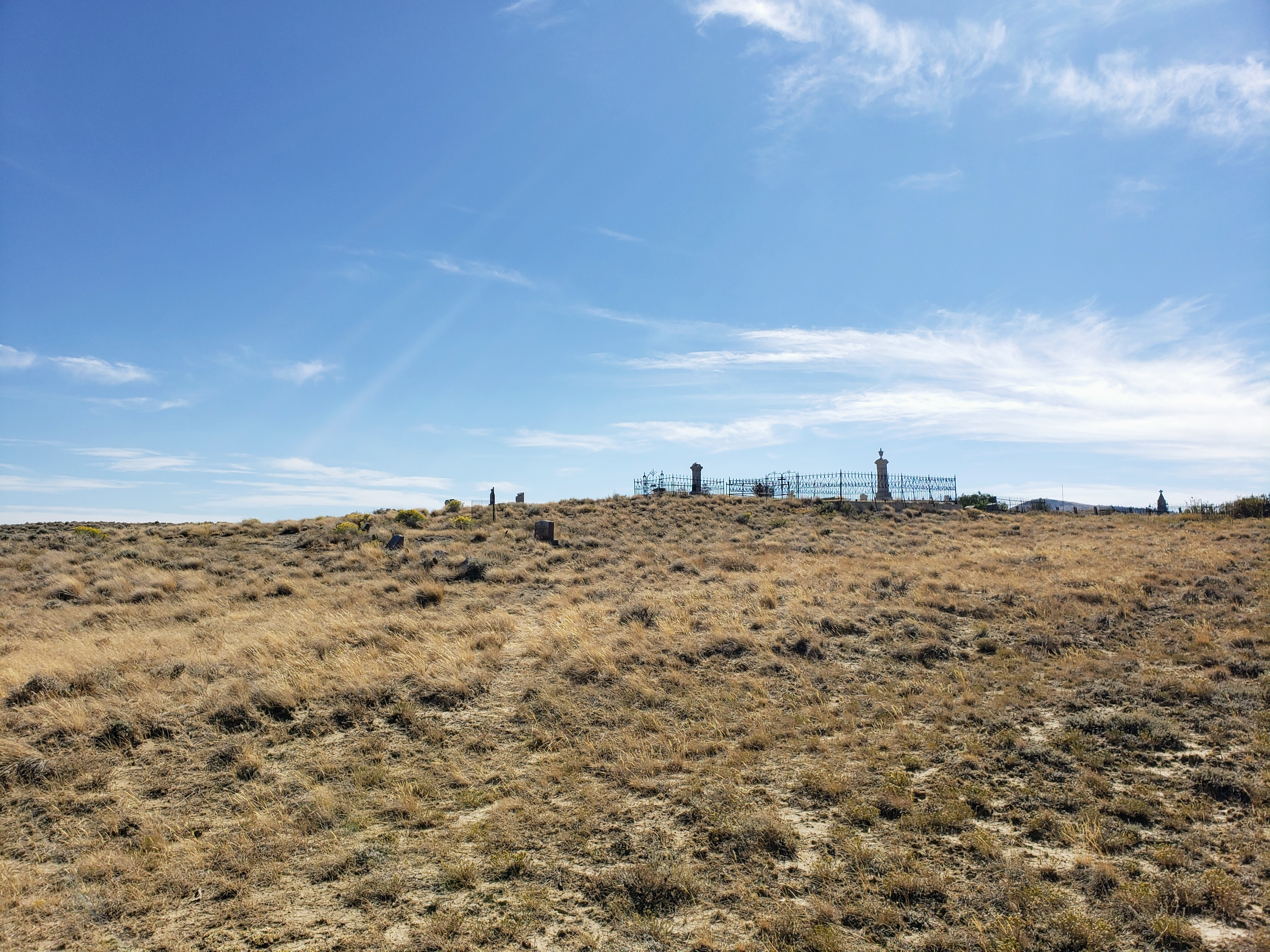

- Location within Wyoming
- Location: County Road 115
- Nearest city: Carbon, Wyoming
- Coordinates: 41°51′07″N 106°22′43″W
- NRHP reference No.: 10001048
- Added to NRHP: April 7, 2011

Carbon Cemetery is a cemetery in the coal-mining ghost town of Carbon, Wyoming. It was one of the first formal burial grounds in Wyoming, and is one of the few remaining vestiges of the town. Starting about 1868 the dead were brought to the town to be buried. By the late 1880s coal mining dropped off and the railroad moved elsewhere, and the town began to die. Victims of mine explosions were buried in the cemetery in 1903 and 1908. Its last resident died in 1912. A few burials took place after the town was abandoned.

The 5-acre (2.0 ha) site occupies an exposed location about nine miles southwest of Medicine Bow, Wyoming. It is surrounded by joined wood and metal posts, with a graveled loop road through the site. There are 239 marked graves and 98 more unmarked graves. It is likely that undocumented graves are present. The graves include traditional headstones as well as rock cairns, typically marking undocumented burials. The graves of the formerly numerous Finnish townspeople are vertical metal bars with vertical metal plates at the top, with painted inscriptions. Most of the lettering is now gone.

The cemetery was placed on the National Register of Historic Places on April 7, 2011.
