= Atlanta Fringe Festival =

Fringe festival in Atlanta

The Atlanta Fringe Festival was conceived in 2010 by a small group of art and theatre lovers. The festival debuted in Atlanta, Georgia. May 9–13, 2012. The festival has attracted performers from all over the United States, including actors, dancers, comedians and aerialists. In its inaugural year, the Atlanta Fringe Festival received over 40 performance submissions. Like the original Edinburgh Festival Fringe in Edinburgh, Scotland, the Atlanta Fringe is a non-juried event that showcases both professional and experimental theatre. Unlike the Edinburgh Festival Fringe, which started on the fringe of the Edinburgh International Festival, the Atlanta Fringe isn’t based on a main festival.

== Features ==
=== Non-juried performances ===
The Atlanta Fringe Festival is nonjuried—judges do not select the shows appearing in the festival. Instead, the performers submitted applications and were chosen by lottery. In 2012, there will be 29 opportunities to see the shows offered by the festival. During the Atlanta Fringe, the performances will be available at six venues including Beacon Dance, Core Dance, Mask Center, Horizons School Theatre, Horizons School Gym and Wonderroot.

=== Radio Fringe ===
The Atlanta Fringe Festival is the first Fringe to have a radio play component. The audio submissions will be made available on the festival’s website. There is a $2 fee for listeners to gain access to Radio Fringe. The categories for Radio Fringe include radio plays, storytelling and sound art. The artists were selected on a first-come, first-served basis.

=== Easter Art Hunt ===
On March 31, 2012 the Atlanta Fringe Festival hosted its inaugural Easter Art Hunt in Grant Park, the fourth largest park in Atlanta. At this event, participants searched for and kept free artwork from Atlanta-area artists. Hundreds of people found over 100 art pieces hidden throughout Grant Park.

=== AFF workshops ===
Early in 2012, the Atlanta Fringe offered five business workshops for artists. The workshop facilitators were professionals in their respective areas. The topics discussed at the workshops were managing volunteers, producing a show, copyrighting original works, grant writing and corporate funding.
