= Prague Fringe Festival =

Prague Festival Fringe
- Genre: Arts festival
- Locations: Prague, Czech Republic
- Years active: 2001-present
- Founded: 2001
- Website: http://www.praguefringe.com/

The Prague Fringe Festival is an annual event held every May and June in Prague, Czech Republic. It is a fringe festival, on the model of the Edinburgh Festival Fringe. Founded in 2001, the festival regularly programmes more than 200 artists in about 45 productions, and 250 performances in genres including theatre, comedy, cabaret, spoken-word, and children's shows.

The Prague Fringe Festival takes place in eight venues around Mala Strana, varying from the medieval basement of a hotel to more traditional black-box theatres, with several different performances in each space each day.

The 2020 Prague Fringe was scheduled to take place from 22 May until 30 May and would have marked the event's 19th anniversary; however in March 2020 organisers announced that due to the ongoing 2020 coronavirus pandemic, the festival had been rescheduled for October 2020.
