= FRIGID New York =

Coordinates: 40.726417°N 73.989933°W

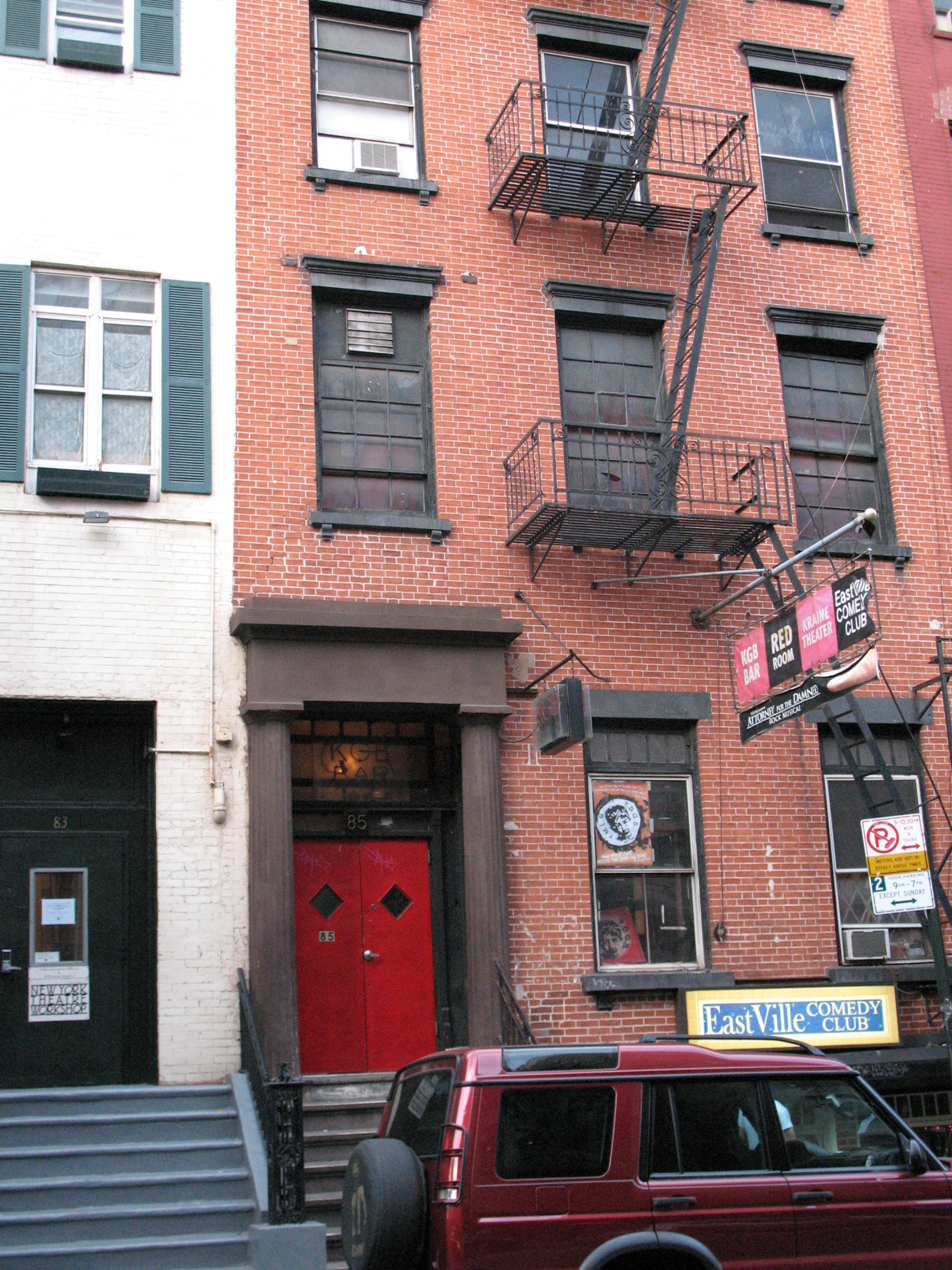
85 East 4th Street – location of FRIGID New York

FRIGID New York (formerly the Horse Trade Theater Group) was founded in 1998 in the East Village neighborhood of Manhattan, New York City. Its primary address is 85 East 4th Street between Second Avenue and The Bowery. The two theaters in the group are the Kraine Theater and UNDER St. Marks. These theaters are the artistic homes to the many Off-Off Broadway theatre artists involved with FRIGID as resident artists and guest artists. In May of 2023, FRIGID announced that it would be leaving its 25-year home at the Kraine Theater, while remaining in operation in Under St Marks, in order to seek a more physically accessible space.

In 2015, the Horse Trade Theater Group/Fire This Time Festival won the Obie Grant at the Obie Awards presented by the American Theater Wing.

FRIGID New York is home to a number of yearly festivals including the Fire This Time Festival, the FRIGID New York Fringe Festival, Estrogenius, Queerly, the Little Shakespeare Festival, Days of the Dead, the Gotham Storytelling Festival, and FunnYmmigrants.
