= Florida Symphony Orchestra =

Florida Symphony Orchestra may refer to:

- Florida Orchestra
- Florida Symphony Youth Orchestras
- Florida Symphony Orchestra, Orlando
