= Kempsville High School =

Coordinates: 36°49′15.6″N 76°9′25.8″W

Location
- 5194 Chief Trail; Virginia Beach, Virginia 23464; United States

Information
- School type: Public, high school
- Founded: 1966
- Locale: City, Large
- School district: Virginia Beach City Public Schools
- NCES District ID: 5103840
- Superintendent: Dr. Donald Robertson
- NCES School ID: 510384001694
- Principal: Tamika Singletary-Johnson
- Staff: 158
- Teaching staff: 117.00 (on an FTE basis)
- Grades: 9–12
- Enrollment: 2,046 (2024–25)
- Student to teacher ratio: 17.49
- Language: English
- Campus: Kempsville
- Colors: Royal blue, red and silver
- Athletics conference: Virginia High School League
- Mascot: Chiefs
- Communities served: Kempsville
- Feeder schools: All Virginia Beach Middle Schools
- Website: www.kempsvillehs.vbschools.com

Kempsville High School is a comprehensive public high school for students in grades 9–12 in the Virginia Beach City Public Schools system. In the western section of the city, the Kempsville High School covers approximately 12 sq. miles and draws students from Kempsville Middle School and Larkspur Middle School.

It is about one mile south of Interstate 264. The mascot is an Indian Chief and the school colors are red, royal blue, and silver.

== History ==
Kempsville High School opened its doors to students in 1924. The present building, which opened in 1966, is the third building to have the name Kempsville High School. From 1959 until 1966, students living in the Kempsville area attended Princess Anne High School. In 1966, when the growth of the city required the construction of neighborhood high schools, Kempsville High School reopened at its current location, serving grades eight through twelve. In 1969, grades eight and nine moved to the newly opened Kempsville Junior High School. The ninth grade moved back to the high school in September 1993. Currently, Kempsville High School houses roughly 1,500 students in grades nine through twelve. As of 2023, Kempsville has the second largest population compared to other Virginia Beach City Public Schools.

== Curriculum ==
Kempsville High School offers an array of academic courses that include standard courses, honors courses and advanced placement courses. These courses include:

AP Studio Art, AP Art History, AP English Literature and Composition, AP English Language and Composition, AP U.S. History, AP Human Geography, AP U.S. Government and Politics, AP European History, AP Psychology, AP Biology, AP Chemistry, AP Computer Science, AP Environmental Science, AP Statistics, AP Calculus AB, AP French Language, AP Spanish Language, AP Spanish Literature, AP German Language, and AP Latin: Vergil.

== Entrepreneurship & Business Academy ==
Kempsville High School offers an additional curriculum focused on business, finance, or technology. The intention of the classes is to encourage local entrepreneurship and the creation of companies within the community. Classes range from Entrepreneurial cooking (a home-economics class with a business spin) to Incubator EDU (a business class in which students start their own companies). The Academy is most notable for its claim of producing Associate's Degrees to graduating students who perform a certain course load.

== Notable alumni ==
- D.J. Dozier (1983), former professional baseball player and NFL running back
- Steve Jolley (1993), MLS Soccer player
- Jason Winston George (1990), actor
- Al Gettel (1935), baseball player
- Anton Gunn (1991), American politician
- Charles "Chase Chad" Hugo (1992), half of the production duo The Neptunes and N*E*R*D band member
- Kierin Kirby (1981), entertainer, former lead singer of Deee-Lite known as "Lady Miss Kier"
- Andy Kubiszewski (1979), drummer, songwriter, and producer
- Ann Matlack (1973), politician
- Nancy Naigle (1979), novelist
- Mark Phelps (1984), head basketball coach at Drake University
- J. R. Reid (1986), former NBA player and 5th pick of the 1989 NBA draft
- Bruce Ridge (1982) symphonic bassist, arts advocate, labor leader, chairman of the International Conference of Symphony and Opera Musicians
- Rhea Seehorn (1990), actress
- DeVaughn Washington (2007), basketball player
- Kenna Zemedkun, solo artist (music)
