= Bob Carr Theater =

Auditorium in Orlando, Florida

Coordinates: 28°32′52″N 81°23′2″W

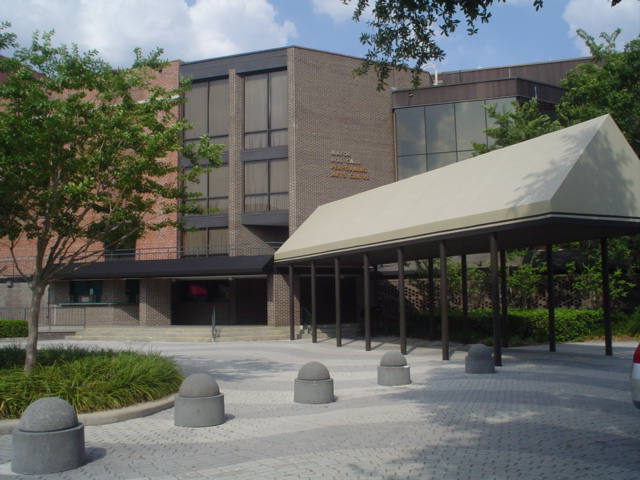
- Entrance of venue (c.2006)
- Interactive map of Bob Carr Theater
- Former names: Orlando Municipal Auditorium (1927-78); Bob Carr Performing Arts Centre (1978-2014); Bob Carr Theater (2014-present)
- Address: 401 W Livingston St; Orlando, FL 32801-1413
- Location: Callahan/Parramore
- Owner: City of Orlando
- Capacity: 2,401

Construction
- Opened: February 21, 1927
- Renovated: 1962, 1975-78, 1991
- Cost: $175,000 ($3.21 million in 2025 dollars)

Tenants
- Florida Symphony Youth Orchestra (1958-present); Florida Symphony Orchestra (1953-1993]) [Orlando Opera] (1958-2009); Orlando Ballet (1974-2014); Broadway Across America (1984-2014); Festival of Orchestras (1984-2011); Orlando Philharmonic Orchestra (1993-2022)

Website
- Venue Website

Bob Carr Theater (originally the Orlando Municipal Auditorium and formerly the Bob Carr Performing Arts Centre) is an auditorium located in Orlando, Florida. Opening in 1927, the venue is currently owned by the City of Orlando and in 2013, the site was integrated into the Creative Village Development plan.

== History ==
The venue was proposed in 1925 after the city saw a population boom in the early 1920s. In 1926, the land reserved for the Orange County Fair was used for the auditorium. The venue opened on February 21, 1927, with a performance of Aida by the La Scala Grand Opera Company. Throughout the years, the venue became an entertainment mecca, with performances by: Marty Robbins, Andy Griffith and Elvis Presley.

In 1974, the Orlando City Council decided to renovate the auditorium and transform it into a state of the art theater and concert hall. Renovations began in October 1975. In May 1978, the venue was christened the "Mayor Bob Carr Performing Arts Centre", in honor of Bob Carr (mayor of Orlando from 1956 to 1967) and became part of Zev Buffman's theater circuit. In 1988, Buffman sold his interest in the theater and five others in Florida to Pace Theatrical.

The structural and technical changes to the theater helped it become the home to the Florida Symphony Orchestra, Orlando Opera, Orlando Ballet, Orlando Philharmonic Orchestra, Festival of Orchestras and Broadway Across America. With the opening of the Dr. Phillips Center in 2014, many performances held here were moved to the new theater. Dance recitals and orchestral shows were moved to the Steinmetz Hall in 2019.

The Bob Carr Theater was integrated into the Creative Village district of downtown Orlando, a mixed use commercial and residential development.

=== Future use ===
In 2023, Orlando Mayor Buddy Dyer announced that the development plan would include converting the Bob Carr Theater into a "town square" for technology in the downtown district.
