= Kaohsiung City Symphony Orchestra =

Taiwanese symphony orchestra

Coordinates: 22°37′29.9″N 120°21′48.5″E

- Orchestra
- Native name: 高雄市交響樂團
- Short name: KSO
- Former name: Kaohsiung Symphony Orchestra; Kaohsiung City Experimental Symphony Orchestra
- Founded: 1981
- Location: Fengshan, Kaohsiung, Taiwan
- Principal conductor: Yang Chih-chin
- Website: kpcaf.khcc.gov.tw (in Chinese)

Kaohsiung City Symphony Orchestra, also known as Kaohsiung Symphony Orchestra (KCSO or KSO; Chinese: 高雄市交響樂團; pinyin: Gāoxióng Shì Jiāoxiǎng Yuètuán) is a Taiwanese orchestra based in Fengshan District, Kaohsiung. It is also the only professional orchestra in Southern Taiwan. The orchestra was owned and ran by the city government until its privatization in 2009.

== History ==
The orchestra was originally founded in 1981 as Kaohsiung Symphony Orchestra. In 1991, it was renamed as Kaohsiung City Experimental Symphony Orchestra. In 2000, it was again renamed as Kaohsiung City Symphony Orchestra. In April 2009, the orchestra was merged with Kaohsiung Chinese Orchestra by Kaohsiung Mayor Chen Chu to become Kaohsiung Philharmonic Culture and Arts Foundation.

== Directorship ==
Henry Mazer started conducting KCSO since its expansion in 1986. Violinist Pang-Hsiang Hsiao became the conductor since 1993. The current conductor-in-residence of the orchestra is Taiwanese conductor Yang Chih-Chin, who was appointed after an open audition in January 2011.

From 1996 to 1999, conductor Pang-Hsiang Hsiao also served as the interim General Director. Shu-Si Chen became the General Director of the orchestra in 1999. In 2000, KCSO became the in-residence orchestra of the Kaohsiung Music Center and was officially renamed the Kaohsiung City Symphony Orchestra. In July 2007, Hung-Chang Chu was publicly selected as the general director of the orchestra.

It was also KCSO that invited maestro Henry Mazer to Taiwan in the first place, who eventually led the Taipei Philharmonic, then Taipei Sinfonietta, to its fame.

== Transportation ==
The orchestra building is accessible from Dadong Station of Kaohsiung MRT.

== See also ==
- List of symphony orchestras in Taiwan
