= KCSO =

KCSO may refer to:

- Kaohsiung City Symphony Orchestra, an orchestra based in Kaohsiung, Taiwan
- KCSO-LD, a television station in California, United States
