= West Virginia Symphony Orchestra =

American nonprofit orchestra

- Orchestra
- Short name: WVSO
- Former name: Charleston Symphony Orchestra (1943–1988) Charleston Civic Orchestra (1939–1943)
- Founded: 1939
- Location: Charleston, West Virginia
- Concert hall: Maier Foundation Performance Hall, Clay Center
- Principal conductor: Maurice Cohn
- Website: www.wvsymphony.org

The West Virginia Symphony Orchestra is a professional orchestra that performs primarily at the Clay Center in Charleston, West Virginia. The orchestra performs over 50 concerts annually around the state of West Virginia, and has a nationally award-winning education program. The orchestra has played with such soloists as Itzhak Perlman, Isaac Stern, Yo-Yo Ma, Emanuel Ax, Marilyn Horne, and Kathleen Battle. In addition to regular season concerts, the orchestra offers several programs such as the Symphony Chorus and Young People's Concerts. West Virginia Symphony Orchestra is a 501(c)(3) nonprofit organization.

== History ==
=== Early history ===
An earlier symphony orchestra, organized by music educator W. S. Mason and others, served Charleston as early as the 1920s and perhaps before.

Under the direction of William R. Wiant, the Charleston Civic Orchestra gathered 55 musicians for their first rehearsal on September 19, 1939. The first concert was performed at the Charleston Municipal Auditorium on November 14, 1939. The orchestra was officially incorporated on May 29, 1940, and an Executive Board and Women's Committee were formed to support its efforts.

When conductor William R. Wiant left Charleston for military service in the fall of 1942, Antonio Modarelli, conductor of the Wheeling Symphony Orchestra, was called upon to become the new conductor. Prior to coming to Wheeling in 1937, Modarelli had led the Pittsburgh Symphony Orchestra for seven years. Modarelli retained this dual conductorship for five years before moving to Charleston on a full-time basis.

Then, in 1943, the orchestra's name was changed to Charleston Symphony Orchestra. To attract musicians during the war years the orchestra entered into an innovative alliance with the local chemical industry, which agreed to recruit and hire chemical engineers and chemists who were also symphonic musicians. This successful partnership garnered national attention.

The orchestra's first manager, Helen Thompson, a second violinist in the orchestra, was active in the founding of the American Symphony Orchestra League, the professional service organization for orchestras in the United States. Thompson, became its first full-time executive secretary in 1950, and maintained the league's office in Charleston for 12 years.

Composer George Crumb's parents, George(clarinet) and Vivian(cello), were members of the Charleston Symphony Orchestra. Crumb's composition "Poem" was performed by the CSO in 1947. Crumb was 18 years old. "Gethsemane" was performed in 1952.

=== 1950s and 1960s ===
Following Modarelli's death, Geoffrey Hobday led the orchestra from 1954 to 1963. His conductorship was marked by an award from the Alice M. Ditson Fund of Columbia University that funded a guest appearance by composer Stanley Wolfe conducting his Third Symphony. Donald Voorhees, conductor of television's Bell Telephone Hour, also appeared as guest conductor. Hobday was succeeded by Charles Gabor, whose tenure lasted only one season (1964–65), but his Young People's Concerts would become a long-lasting tradition.

In 1965, Charles Gabor was replaced by Charles Schiff. Under Schiff, the orchestra became more cosmopolitan in scope, booking nationally recognized guest artists on a regular basis and presenting more challenging orchestral works than in the past. An expansion of the children's concerts eventually led to the first set of quadruple Young People's Concerts being performed in 1968, a tradition first introduced by Charles Gabor, which continues to this day.

=== 1970s and 1980s ===
Charles Schiff left in 1977, and Ron Dishinger was hired. Dishinger continued the development of the orchestra's education program through an expanded Student Enrichment Program in the elementary schools. Dishinger served as conductor until 1979.

Sidney Rothstein became music director in 1980 and began a period of artistic growth that continued throughout the 1980s. In his first season, Rothstein greatly expanded the orchestra's schedule and performed the first Super Pops concert at the Charleston Civic Center. The following season he formed the orchestra's first resident string quartet and presented the first "Symphony Sunday," an outdoor festival marking the end of the season.

With the appointment of Thomas Conlin as artistic director and conductor in 1984, a new era began for the Charleston Symphony Orchestra. The season expanded in size to 8, then 9, then eventually to 12 concerts including pops. Touring and run-out concerts around the state were also greatly increased, and a second home in Parkersburg was established, through a new organization, the West Virginia Symphony Orchestra – Parkersburg.

In recognition of its new status as a true regional organization, in 1988, the name of the orchestra was changed to the West Virginia Symphony Orchestra.

=== 1990s and 2000s ===
The newly named West Virginia Symphony Orchestra celebrated its 50th anniversary during the 1989–1990 season. The highlight of the year-long observances was a five-concert tour culminating in a performance at the John F. Kennedy Center for the Performing Arts in Washington, D.C., on October 29, 1989. Included in the program was a new piano concerto by composer Tomas Svoboda commissioned by the orchestra in celebration of the occasion.

In December 1999, Thomas Conlin announced his intention to step down from the WVSO podium in 2001, concluding an extraordinary 17-year tenure. After an extensive search process that attracted almost 200 applications from around the world, the WVSO named Grant Cooper, a New Zealand native, as artistic director & Conductor of the WVSO in March 2001. Upon the selection of Cooper, Thomas Conlin accepted the title of conductor laureate, in recognition of his extensive accomplishments with the WVSO. In September 2015, Grant Cooper announced that he would step down as artistic director anf conductor at the end of the 2016–17 season. Lawrence Loh was chosen from six finalists to become the new conductor beginning in the 2016–17 season.

On July 12, 2003, the Clay Center for the arts and sciences of West Virginia opened, where the West Virginia Symphony Orchestra would establish its new home. Since 2003, the orchestra has performed its primary concerts in the Clay Center's Maier Foundation Performance Hall, an 1,883-seat theater with exceptional acoustics and sight lines.

=== Artistic directors and composers ===
• Maurice Cohn (since 2023)

- Lawrence Loh (2017–2022)
- Grant Cooper (2001–2017)
- Thomas Conlin (1984–2001)
- Sidney Rothstein (1980–1984)
- Ron Dishinger (1977–1979)
- Charles Schiff (1965–1977)
- Charles Gabor (1964–1965)
- Geoffrey Hobday (1954–1964)
- Antonio Modarelli (1942–1954)
- William R. Wiant (1939–1942)
