= Christmas Joy =

Christmas Joy may refer to:

- Christmas Joy (Psych), an episode of the TV series Psych
- Christmas Joy (EP), an EP by Mandisa
- Christmas Joy, a novel by Nancy Naigle
