= Marija Petković =

Croatian Catholic nun (1892–1966)

Blessed Marija Petković

Personal details
- Born: December 10, 1892 Blato, Kingdom of Dalmatia, Austria-Hungary (modern-day Croatia)
- Died: July 9, 1966 (aged 73) Rome, Italy

Sainthood
- Feast day: July 9
- Venerated in: Roman Catholic Church
- Title as Saint: Foundress
- Beatified: 6 June 2003; Dubrovnik, Croatia by Pope John Paul II

Marija Petković, also known as The Blessed Mary of Jesus Crucified Petković; (Croatian: Marija od Propetoga Isusa Petković, Italian: Maria Di Gesù Crocifisso), (10 December 1892 - 9 July 1966) was the founder of the Catholic Congregation of the Daughters of Mercy. She was recognized by the Catholic Church as Venerable on 8 May 1998, and was beatified by Pope John Paul II on 6 June 2003.

== Biography ==
Petković was born in the small town of Blato on the Croatian island of Korčula, the sixth of eleven children born to mother Marija Marinović and father Antun Petković-Kovač.

After elementary school, Petković enrolled in 1904 in Blato's municipal school, which had been recently founded by the Servants of Charity, a Catholic order newly arrived from Italy. After successfully completing the three-year program, she continued her studies at the School of Domestic Science, also directed by the Servants of Charity. In 1906 she joined the association of the Daughters of Mary. About this time she revealed to Bishop of Dubrovnik Josip Marcelić that she wanted to enter the convent, which marked the beginning of Marija's spiritual direction under the Bishop's care. On 21 November 1906, she made a private vow of chastity to the Lord.

From 1909 to 1919 Petković was president of the Daughters of Mary. Although frail and frequently ill, in addition to her obligations in her parents' home, she provided catechesis and instruction in general subjects to the children of the families whose parents worked on her father's estate. In 1911 her father died, leaving her to help her mother care for the family and provide for the education of the other children. That labor, amid the destruction wreaked in Croatia by World War I, was very influential in Petković's vocational discernment. She became involved in a number of Catholic organizations, and, in 1915, under the guidance of Bishop Josip, began her first new association, the Society of Catholic Mothers. In 1917 she assumed the responsibility of guiding the Third Order Franciscans. That same year, she began helping the Servants of Charity in the "soup kitchen" that they directed.

In 1918, Petković made a formal promise to the Bishop to remain in Blato to help and live with the poor. On 25 March 1919, Petković and her friend, Marija Telenta, entered the convent of the Servants of Charity. Two months later, however, the Mother Superior died and the other sisters, for political reasons, returned to Italy. Petković, her companion, and two other nuns were all that remained of the convent. Bishop Josip watched over and advised the four Sisters, especially Petković, whom he counseled in humility and service. She requested from him the Rule of the Third Order Franciscans, and, in the winter of 1919, opened three institutions in Blato: a day-recovery centre, a child-care facility, and an orphanage.

On 25 August 1920, in Prižba (on the island of Korčula), Petković wrote the first Constitutions of the Order of Daughters of Mercy, the Third Independent Order of St. Francis, setting forth their mission of spreading knowledge of divine love and mercy through charitable acts. Bishop Josip inaugurated the Order on 4 October, the Feast of St. Francis of Assisi. On that day, Petković received the name of Marija od Propetoga Isusa (Mary of Jesus Crucified) and was chosen as the Mother Superior of the Order. When the nuns in Blato had exhausted their own funds for helping poor and hungry children, she went to fertile plains of Slavonia and Bačka to solicit help for the orphans and widows, receiving, among other contributions, a donation from Pope Pius XI. In return, Bishop of Bačka Apostolic Administration, Ljudevit Lajčo Budanović, asked Petković to found monasteries of her Order in Subotica and surrounding areas, so the locals could get the spiritual gain that nuns of her Order could provide them. Noticing that Bačka also had problems of numerous poor and abandoned children, in 1923, Petković acted quickly and opened Kolijevka Children's Home in Subotica, Home for sick and neglected children, after which she opened numerous centers for children in Croatia (in Slavonia particularly), Serbia, and Vardar Macedonia.

From 1920 to 1952, Petković was elected five times as the Superior General of the Daughters of Mercy. She traveled throughout Croatia, Latin America, and Italy, opening 46 communities. The growing number of Sisters served in various social ministries, such as in nursing homes, kindergartens, hospitals, nursery schools, parish work, and work in the seminaries.

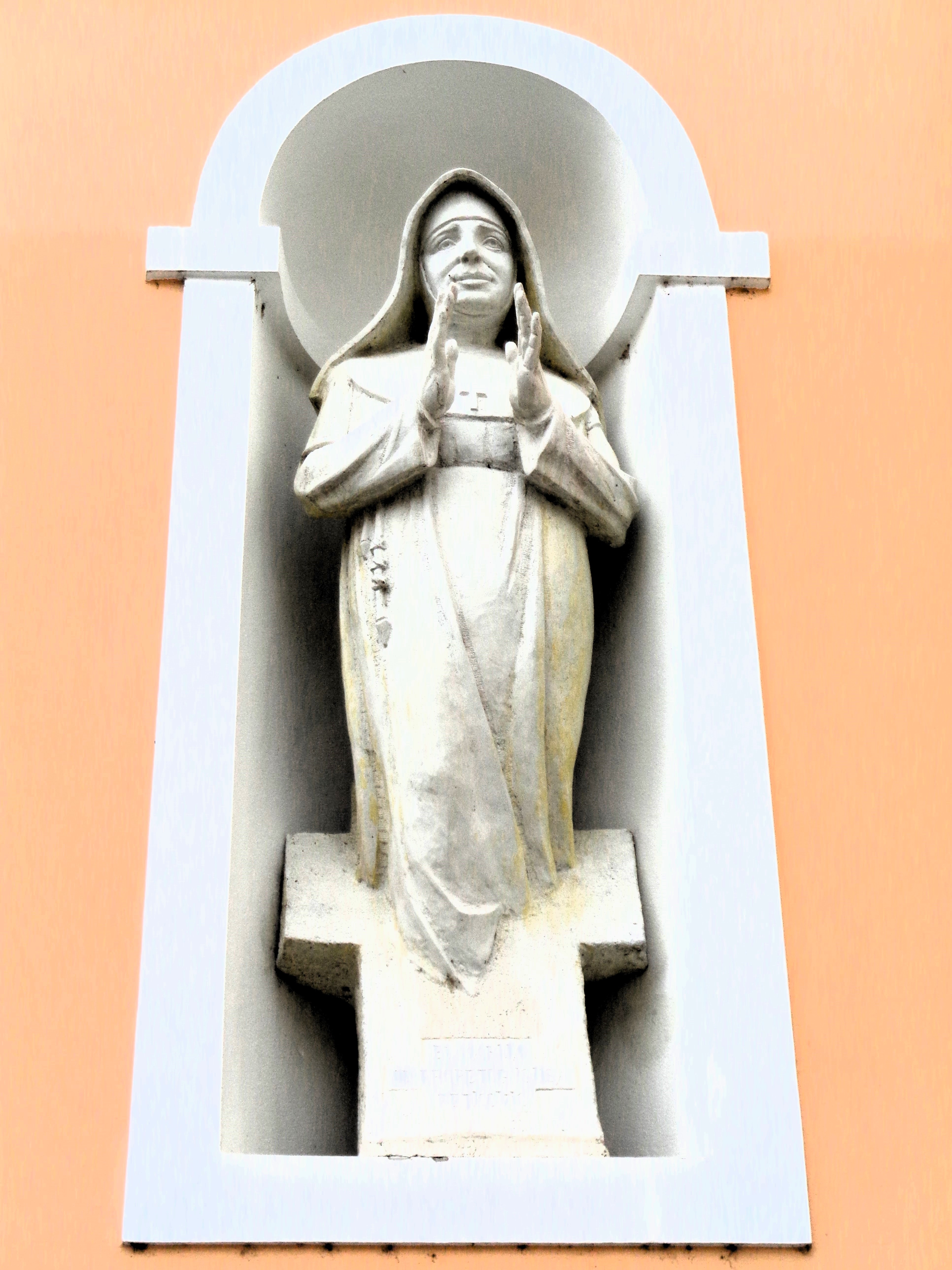
Petković's statue at the Varaždin Cathedral

Beginning in 1936, the Order was prominent in Latin and South America. Petković lived in Argentina from 1940 to 1952, promoting charity work in many countries in Latin America. In addition to catechesis, she organized instruction in hygiene, economics, homemaking, sewing and tailoring, knitting, nursing, and typing. In 1952, she went to Rome to purchase and set up the Congregation's headquarters. While there in 1954 she suffered a stroke which left her permanently paralyzed. In 1961, she concluded that her duty to the Congregation was no longer one of leadership but of sacrifice and suffering, prayer and offering herself to the Lord, and relinquished the office of Mother Superior that she had held for 40 years.

She continued to follow the events in the Catholic Church and her Congregation, especially those changes brought about by the Second Vatican Council, until age 74, when she died. She was buried in the Roman cemetery of Campo Verano. Three years later, her remains were translated to the house chapel of the Congregation headquarters, where they remained until 1998 when they were translated to her native Blato and buried in the crypt of the monastery chapel of Christ the King.

== Beatification ==
On 26 August 1988, the Peruvian submarine BAP Pacocha was rammed and sunk by a Japanese fishing trawler. Teniente (lieutenant) Roger Cotrina Alvarado, a Peruvian naval officer, distinguished himself during the disaster – praying for Petković's aid, Cotrina displayed superhuman strength in opening a hatch against several thousands of pounds of water. That action prevented the immediate deaths of 22 crewmen, and Cotrina's subsequent actions brought about their rescue.

On 28 February 1989, the Congregation for the Causes of the Saints began an investigation into the reports of the miracle. On 8 May 1998, Pope John Paul II confirmed the Congregation's initial report and decreed that Petković's heroic virtues be publicly declared, formally recognizing her as "Venerable."

The Congregation issued their ruling on Petković's heroic virtues on 5 July 2002, and on the following 20 December issued a ruling recognizing the miraculous nature of the submarine rescue. On 6 June 2003, Pope John Paul II celebrated her beatification Mass in Dubrovnik, formally recognizing her as "Blessed."

Today, her Congregation has its branches, besides other countries, in Italy, Romania (by Greek Catholic community), Paraguay, Chile, Peru and Argentina.

The Sanctuary of Blessed Marija Petković is in her town of birth, Blato on the Dalmatian island of Korčula.
