= Blato, Korčula =

Blato Blato na Korčuli
- Municipality
- Općina Blato; Municipality of Blato
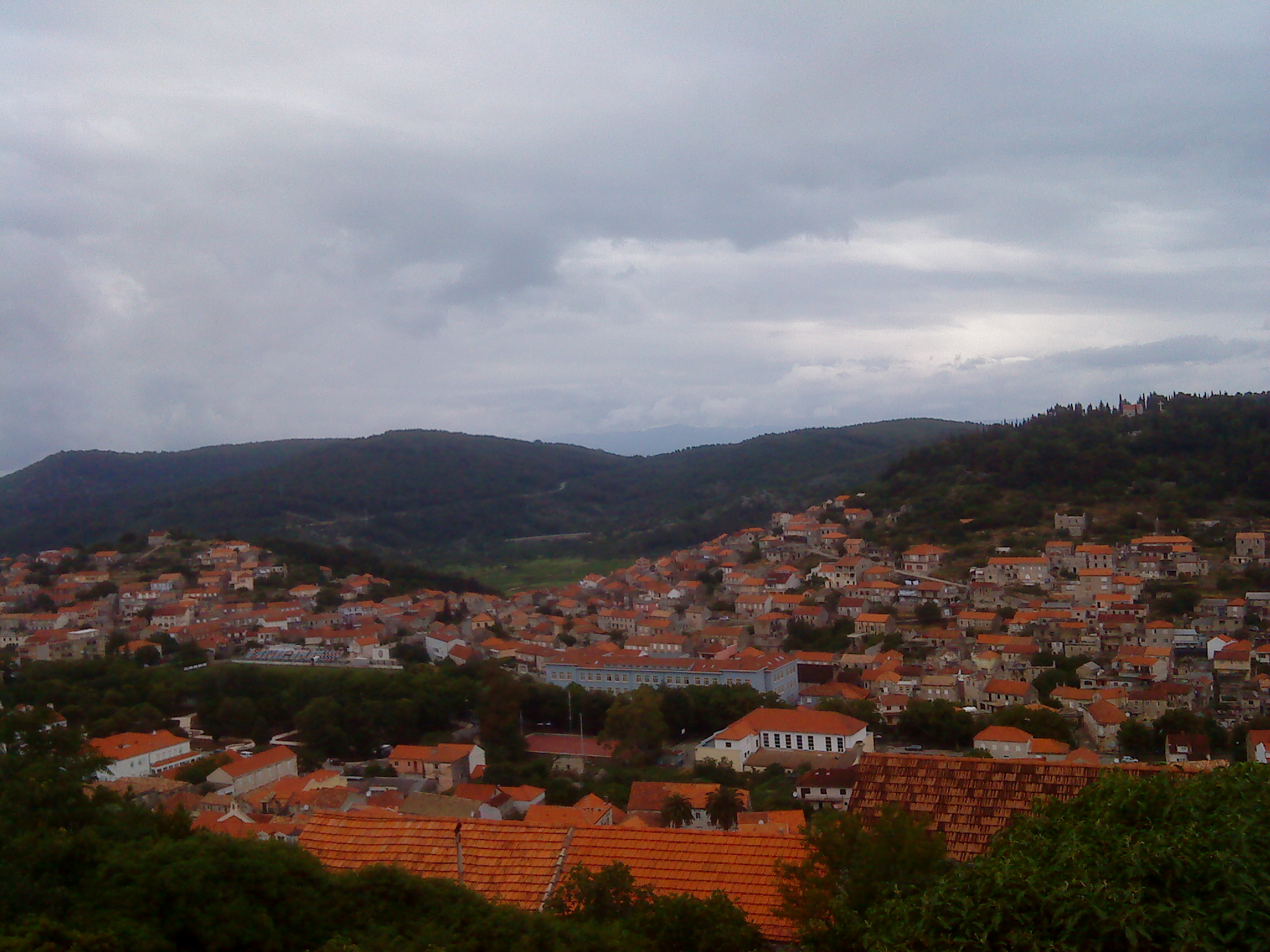
- Panorama of Blato
- Interactive map of Blato
- Location within Croatia
- Coordinates: 42°56′N 16°47′E
- Country: Croatia
- County: Dubrovnik-Neretva County

Government
  - Municipal mayor: Ante Šeparović

Area
  - Municipality: 66.5 km^{2} (25.7 sq mi)
  - Urban: 62.3 km^{2} (24.1 sq mi)

Population (2021)
  - Municipality: 3,330
  - Density: 50.1/km^{2} (130/sq mi)
  - Urban: 3,282
  - Urban density: 52.7/km^{2} (136/sq mi)
- Time zone: UTC+1 (CET)
  - Summer (DST): UTC+2 (CEST)
- Postal code: 20271
- Area code: 020
- Vehicle registration: DU
- Climate: Csa
- Website: blato.hr

Blato (often Blato na Korčuli, lit. 'Blato on Korčula') is a municipality on the island of Korčula in Croatia. It can be reached by the main island road from town of Korčula. The road runs through the forests in the middle of the island of Korčula.

== Geography ==
The town was amphitheatrically built on several hills around a small central valley (40 km away from the town of Korčula). A long avenue of linden trees called Zlinje runs through it, along with the town public buildings (recently built: schools, hotel, bank, shops, municipal building, medical centre etc.). There is a park that provides exceptional shade during the summer months.

The climate in Blato matches the entire island of Korčula - it is located in the Adriatic which has a Mediterranean climate, characterized by long, quiet, dry and hot summer days with clear, short and mild wet winters. During the entire year the temperatures go below 10 °C in January and February, while June, July, August and September they average above 20 °C. Rainfall is typically Mediterranean, with a peak in late autumn and early winter and a minimum in July.

== History ==
Blato got its name from a neighbouring field which flooded on a regular basis until 1911. The Blato field was occasionally drained. This created a lake that dried up during summer. The construction of canals and tunnels channelled drainage water into the sea on the north coast. It created conditions for successful exploitation of more fertile land in this region.

The town itself is one of the oldest settlements on Korčula and is situated in the middle of the western part of a field. The area of Blato is believed to have been settled during Roman times. There is a church, 'Our Lady of the Field', located on the Blato Field that has Roman floors that place its beginnings in the 4th century. Archaeological remains of Roman Junianum (agricultural estate) have been discovered. Other remains have been found in the local area dating back to prehistoric and Illyrian times.

Between World War I and World War II, phylloxera attacked the grape vines, causing them to perish en masse. This greatly contributed to the economic crisis that was happening within the newly formed Yugoslavia. Blato was facing a mass exodus. It was the sixth largest place in Dalmatia, then a region of Austro-Hungary (Blato in 1910 had a population of 7,102). During 1924 and 1925, about 890 residents abandoned their homes and left Blato. Whole families emigrated to Australia and Brazil (especially São Paulo).

During World War II, Blato was bombed by the Allies.

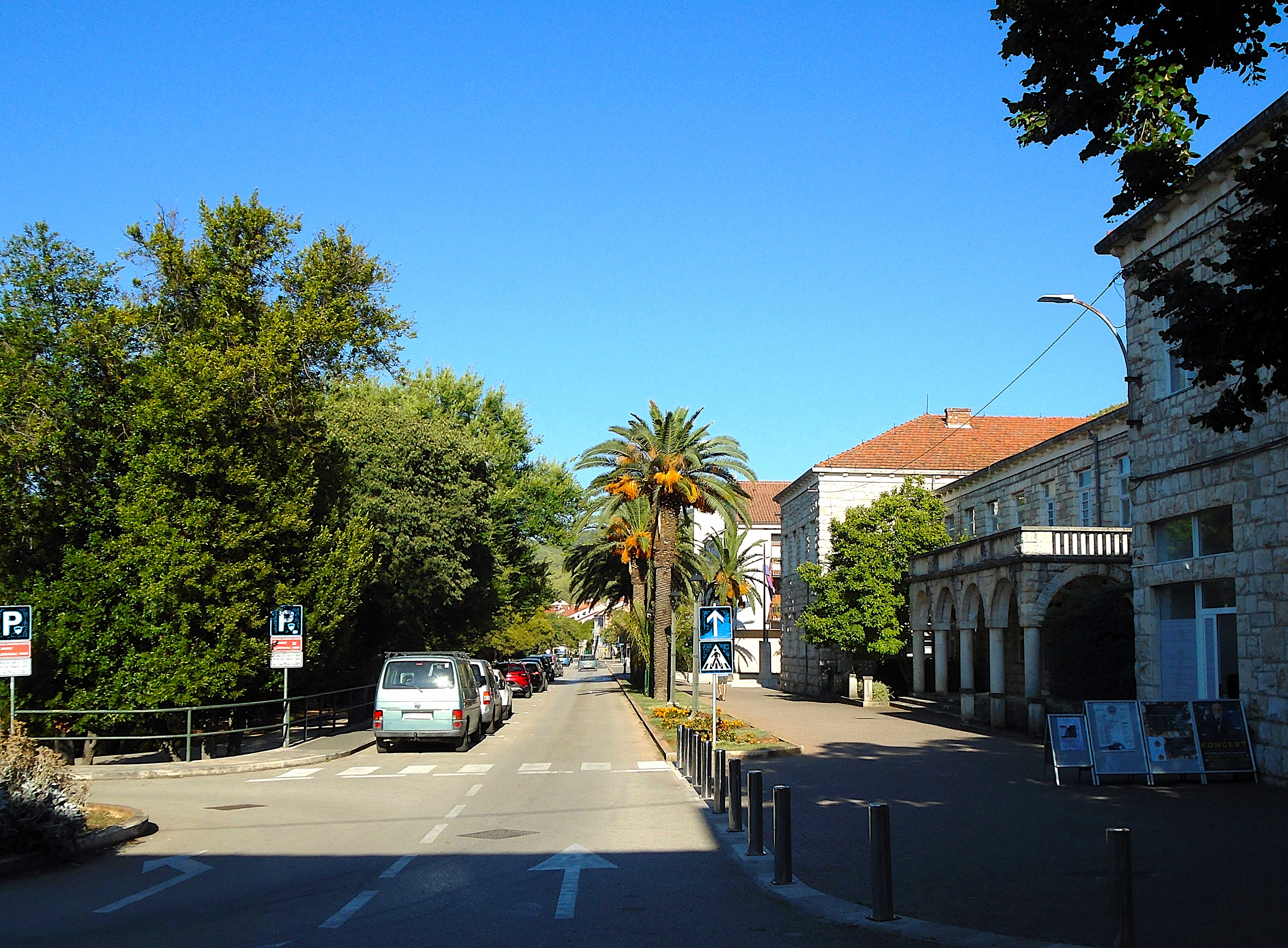
Town centre

== Municipality of Blato ==
The Municipality of Blato, situated on the island of Korčula, administratively falls under the Dubrovnik-Neretva County. The municipality is made up of Blato and Potirna. It has access to the sea on both sides of the island. Once the main port of Blato, Prigradica is located about 3 km north of the town of Blato. The municipality's coastline is 36.3 kilometers in length. Within the area are olive trees and vineyards.

== Demographics ==
According to the 2021 census, its population was 3,330 with 3,282 living in the town proper. According to the 2011 census, the Municipality of Blato had a population of 3,593. The vast majority of the population are Roman Catholics.

In 2021, the municipality consisted of the following settlements:

- Blato, population 3,282
- Potirna, population 48
Blato: Population trends 1857–2021
v

| population | 3450 | 4928 | 4091 | 5047 | 5887 | 7208 | 8270 | 8301 | 5732 | 5787 | 5216 | 5937 | 3874 | 4107 | 3680 | 3593 | 3330 |
| | 1857 | 1869 | 1880 | 1890 | 1900 | 1910 | 1921 | 1931 | 1948 | 1953 | 1961 | 1971 | 1981 | 1991 | 2001 | 2011 | 2021 |

Sources: Croatian Bureau of Statistics publications

== Economy ==
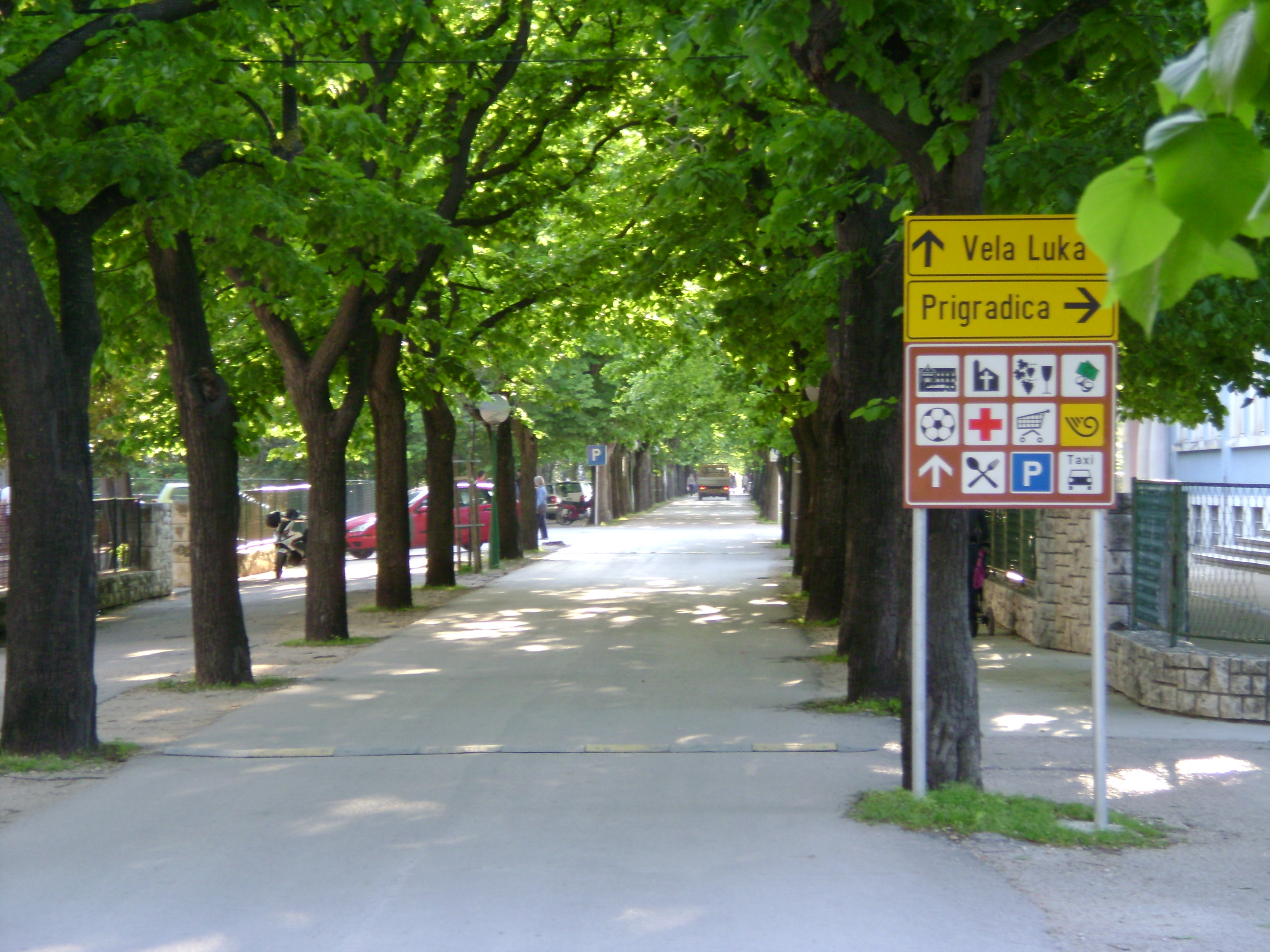
Lipa avenue in Blato.

During the long history of Blato, the economy has been oriented around the production of agricultural products, especially wine. Olive oil, wine, carob and fig trees are the most significant products of the region. In the early 20th century Blato produced over 1000 carts of wine and 30 wagons of olive oil for export. In addition, they produced legumes and cereals for their own use. Strong development of agriculture led to the development of ancillary services such as crafts and commercial activities.

After the Second World War, Blato began a new cycle of development. They further developed the metal industry, textile industry, tourism and the agricultural industry. The population continued to decline, albeit more slowly than before. Industrial production in Blato, in recent times has seen a down turn with the closure of the textile factory Trikop. Metal industry and agriculture remains important for the economy. Tourism now plays an important role. Hotels and private apartments in Prizba and Prigradica have given new momentum to the economy of Blato.

The main economic entities in Blato today are:

- Radež Inc., a company known for manufacturing marine equipment and steel structures, the largest employer on the island.
- Blato 1902 d.d, a company known for processing and trading agricultural products, especially wine and virgin olive oil.
- Small artisans (craft and other services associated in the Association of Craftsmen)
- Individual agricultural production of wine and olive oil.
- Tourism (apartments, houses and hotels for rent as well as a growing popularity of Airbnb accommodations)
- Trade (trade houses and chains)
- Plumbing Blato d.d
- EKO d.o.o., a company for utility contracting.
- Schools, municipalities and other government institutions and offices.

== Education ==
- Blato Elementary School
- Blato High School

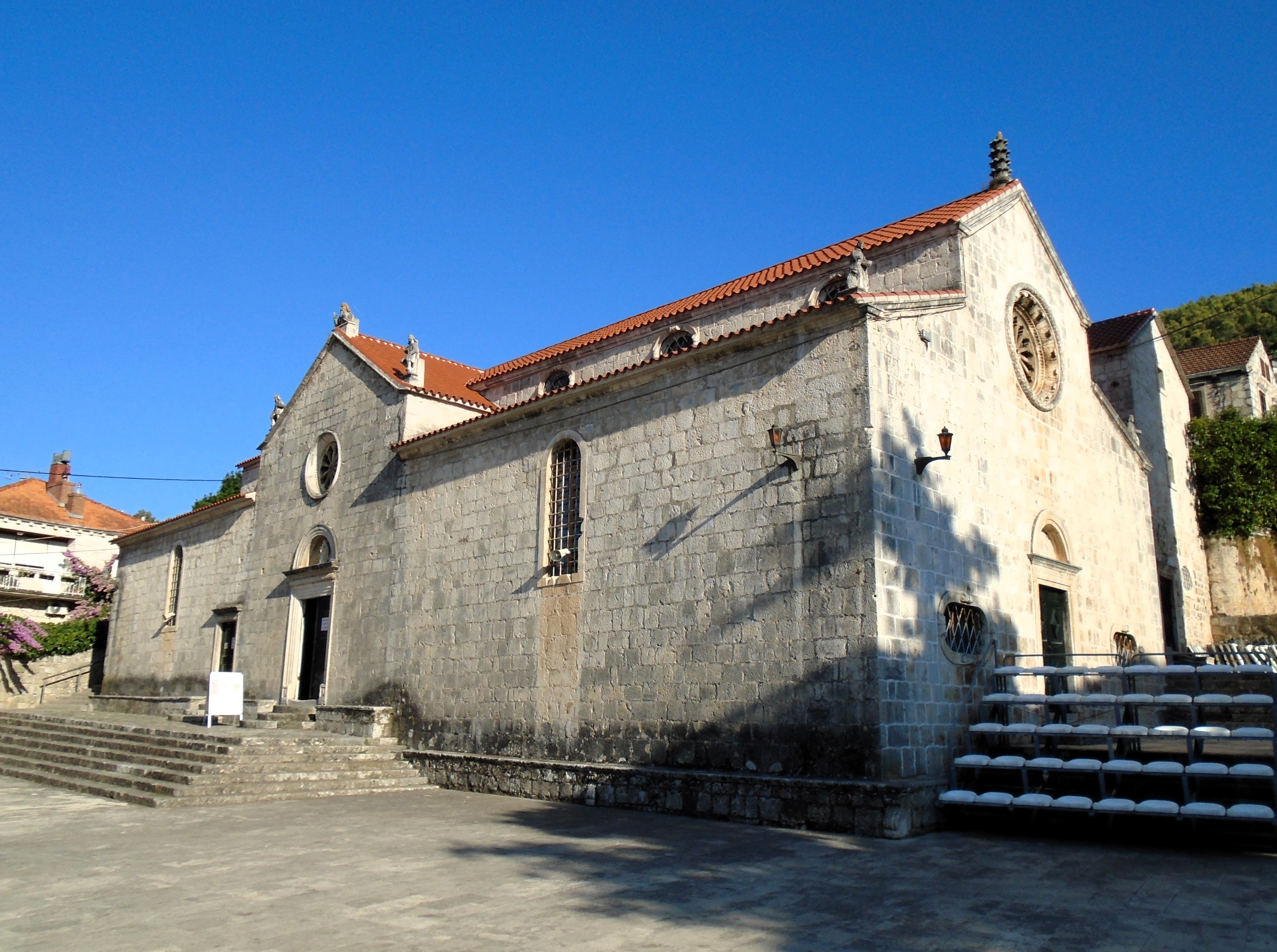
All Saints´ Parish Church

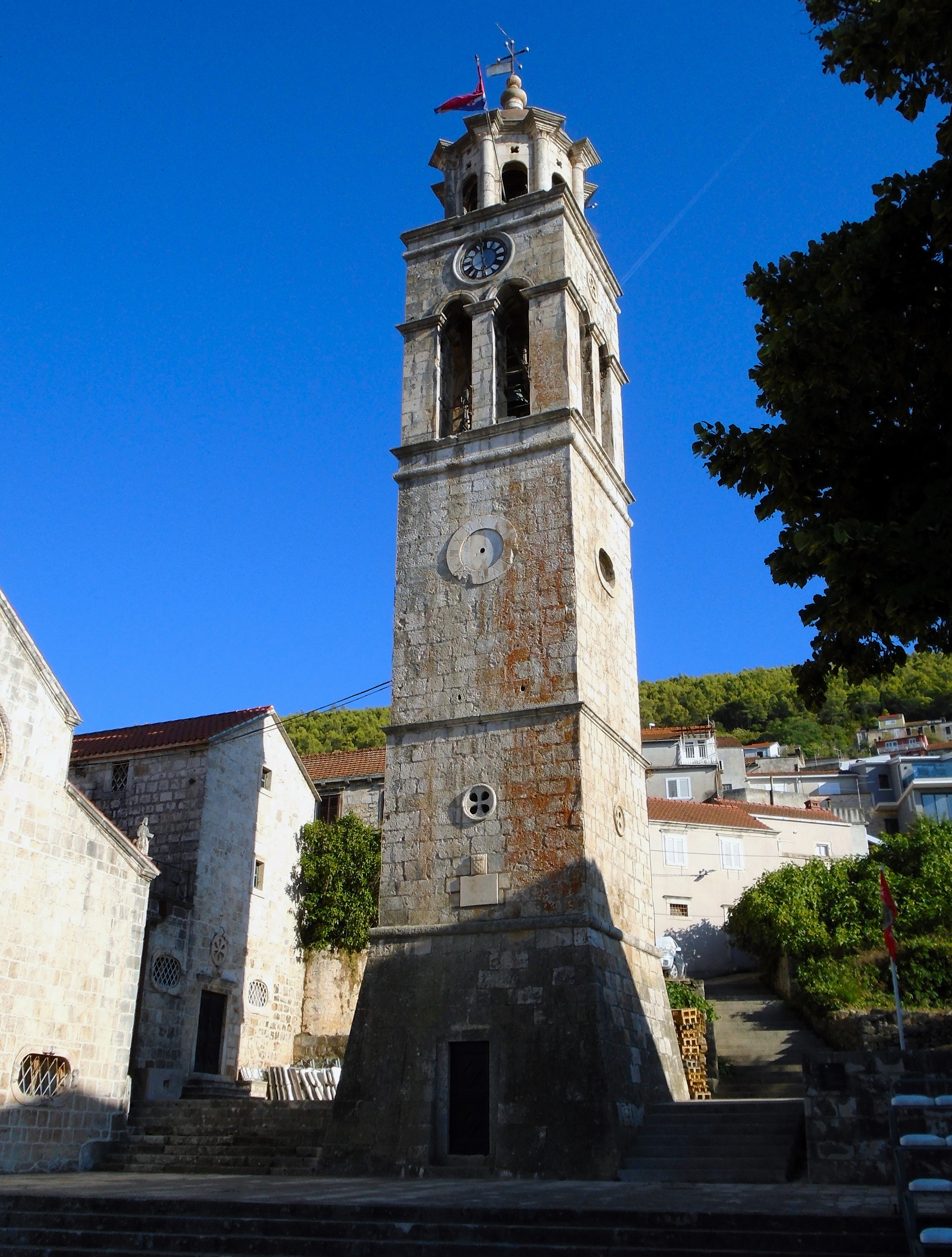
Belltower of the All Saints Parish Church

== Culture ==
The town is known for a famous sword dance, the Kumpanija, which is performed on April 28, the day of Saint Vincenca, the town's patron saint, Blato Public library, sanctuary, ethno-museum, etc.

A bronze foundry located in Blato is one of only three bronze foundries in Croatia and the only one outside of Zagreb.

== Sports ==
The local chapter of the HPS, HPD "Spivnik", was founded in Blato on 12 January 1936, and their first climb was the hill Spivnik. In 1937, its president was Anton Bosnić. In 1938, its president was Nikola Telenta.

== Notable people ==
- Marija Petković, a nun who was declared blessed, the founder of Congregation of Daughters of Mercy of St. Francis, the only religious community founded in Croatia (1892-1966)
- Ivan Milat Luketa, painter (1922-2009)
- Pavle Dešpalj, classical music composer and conductor (1934-2021)
- Ante Žanetić, football player and Olympic gold medalist (1936-2014)
- Meri Cetinić, singer/songwriter (b. 1953)
- Ante Milostic, aka Mario, singer in Deep image band
