= Irwin Leroy Fischer =

American composer and academic (1903–1977)

- Born: July 5, 1903; Iowa City, Iowa, US
- Died: May 7, 1977 (aged 73); Wilmette, Illinois, US
- Occupations: Academic dean, music educator, chief organist, classical composer, radio and recording artist, author
- Spouse: Marlon Fischer

Academic background
- Education: American Conservatory of Music, University of Chicago

Irwin Leroy Fischer (July 5, 1903 – May 7, 1977) was an American composer and organist. He was a long-standing Dean of Faculty of the American Conservatory of Music and organist for the Chicago Symphony Orchestra for 22 years. Fischer was also a recording artist, radio performer and author.

== Career and works ==
He received his MMus from American Conservatory of Music in 1930 and his BA from the University of Chicago in 1924. After being appointed to teach at the American Conservatory of Music in 1928, Fischer also studied with Boulanger in Paris in 1931 and with Kodály in Budapest in 1936.

In the 1930s he invented a new polytonal technical he termed "biplanal." His compositions showed a wide variety of techniques and styles, often showing a mixture of French and German influences.

His works were received "entirely enthusiastic" critic reviews, which described him as "modernistic, but not cacophony." His compositions received less attention following World War II (causing him to turn to conducting and work as an organist, radio, and recording artist), but received renewed serious study in universities beginning in the 1980s. His works were favorable reviewed by notable critics such as the Chicago Tribune's "fearsome" Claudia Cassidy.

Fischer's papers can be found in the archive collections of The Newberry in Chicago.

== Personal life ==
Fischer was married with two children at the time of his death. He frequently volunteered his professional skills as a conductor, composer, and organist to local charities. For example, he composed one of his works "Orchestral Adventures of a Little Tune" for the CSO's 1974–75 Petites Promenades Concert Series for Young People, conducted by Henry Mazer.

== Selected publications ==
- Roberts, Stella and Fischer, Irwin (1967), "Handbook of Modal Counterpoint". Free Press; 1st edition, 160 pages. ISBN 0029265606.
- Fischer, Irwin Leroy (1950). "Harmony."
- Hundreds of published musical scores.

== Selected discography ==
- Thor Johnson, The Peninsula Festival Orchestra – Irwin Fischer / Robert Nagel / Chou Wen-chung / John Lessard – Hungarian Set / Trumpet Concerto / Landscapes / Concerto For Flute, Clarinet, Bassoon And Strings (LP, Mono)
- Coffee House Music
