= Orchestra Society of Philadelphia =

Volunteer orchestra in Philadelphia founded in 1964

- Orchestra
- Founded: 1964; 62 years ago by Morris Goldman and Sidney Rothstein
- Location: Philadelphia, Pennsylvania
- Principal conductor: Jack Moore
- Website: orchestrasociety.org

The Orchestra Society of Philadelphia (OSP) is an all-volunteer “reading” community orchestra founded in Philadelphia in 1964.

As a reading orchestra, the musicians often practice their parts in advance, and the rehearsal is “one-and-done,” meaning the orchestra works through transitions and difficult sections during the first half, and runs it during the second, and then starts all over with new music at the next rehearsal. It is not uncommon here for musicians to practice their sight-reading skills by playing through new scores without prior rehearsal. The goal is to create a setting where musicians, both amateur and professional, can play challenging orchestral works in a serious yet low stress environment, providing an opportunity to maintain and hone their orchestral performing skills. The orchestra rarely performs publicly. Its membership has included Philadelphia Orchestra members, music students, retired professionals and amateurs. Conductors have tried out music they will be leading with other orchestras with OSP.

OSP was founded by Morris Goldman (1919–2012) and Sidney Rothstein (1936–2017).

== Notable Guest Conductors ==
- Max Rudolf
- Lio Kuokman
- William Smith
- Luis Biava Sr.
- Sarah Hicks
- Steven Gunzenhauser
- Everette Lee
- André Raphel
- James Paul
- Joshua Gersen
- Kensho Watanabe
- Jeri Lynne Johnson
- Steven Hackman
- Sameer Patel
- Joseph Primavera
- Thomas Hong
- Mark Laycock
- Kirk Muspratt
- Rick Westerfield
- Jonathan Sternberg
