= Prižba =

Village on Korcula, Croatia

Coordinates: 42°54′N 16°48′E

Location of Prižba in Croatia

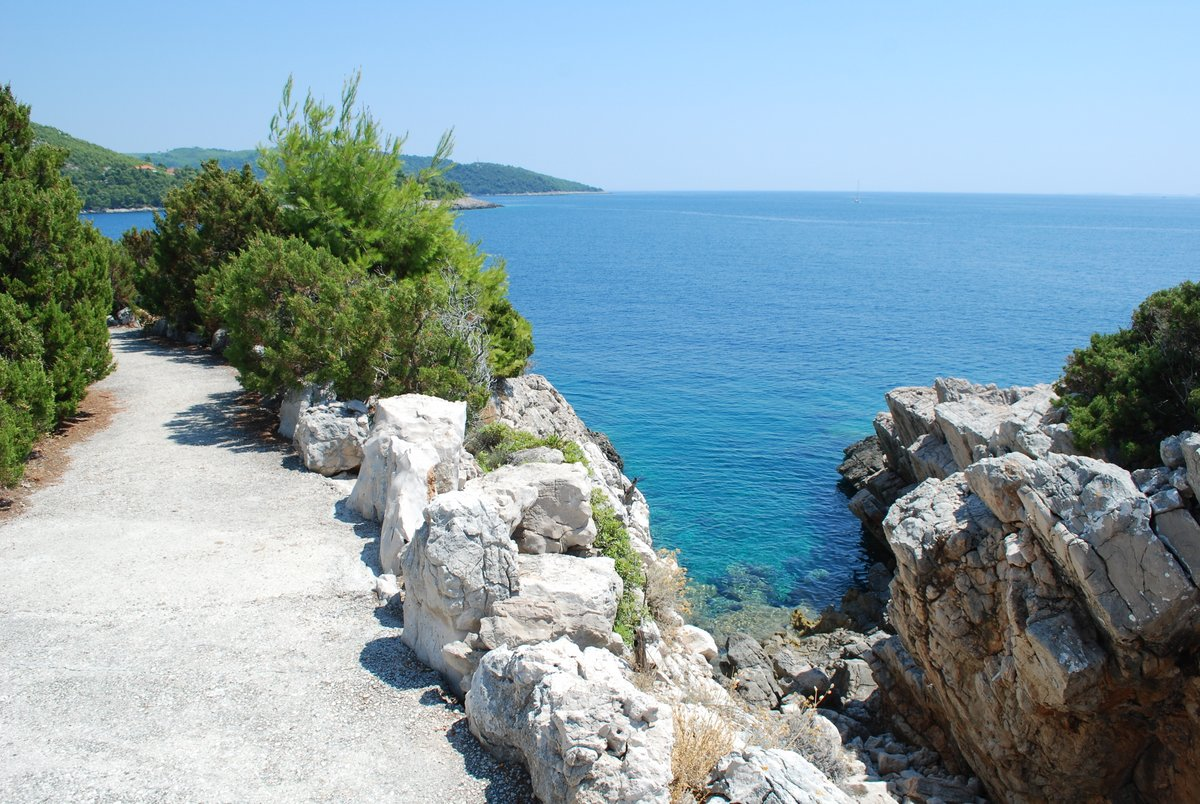
Coast of the island of Korcula.

Prižba is a small village on the island of Korčula in Croatia. Korcula is part of the Dalmatian coast and it belongs to the Dubrovnik-Neretva county. Prizba is part of the Municipality of Blato.

This village is located on the southern coast of Korčula, and its shape follows the coastline. Prižba is 10 km away from the town Blato, 16 km from Vela Luka, 4 km from Brna and 8 km from Smokvica. Prizba is made up of several smaller bays and two peninsulas, Ratak and Priscapac. Priscapac is also a small tourist resort with a small pebble beach.

== Culture ==
In the center of Prižba there's a small Sisters of Mercy convent. In Prizba, the Blessed Mary of Jesus Crucified Petković wrote the Constitution of her Order in 1920.

== Economy ==
The village's economy is based on tourism and associated activities, whereas originally it was almost exclusively fishing as this was a pure fishermen's village. At one end of Prizba is the tourist complex called Prišćapac, which has a sports-diving centre.

== See also ==
- Croatia
- Blato
