= Sarah Hicks =

Japanese-American orchestral conductor

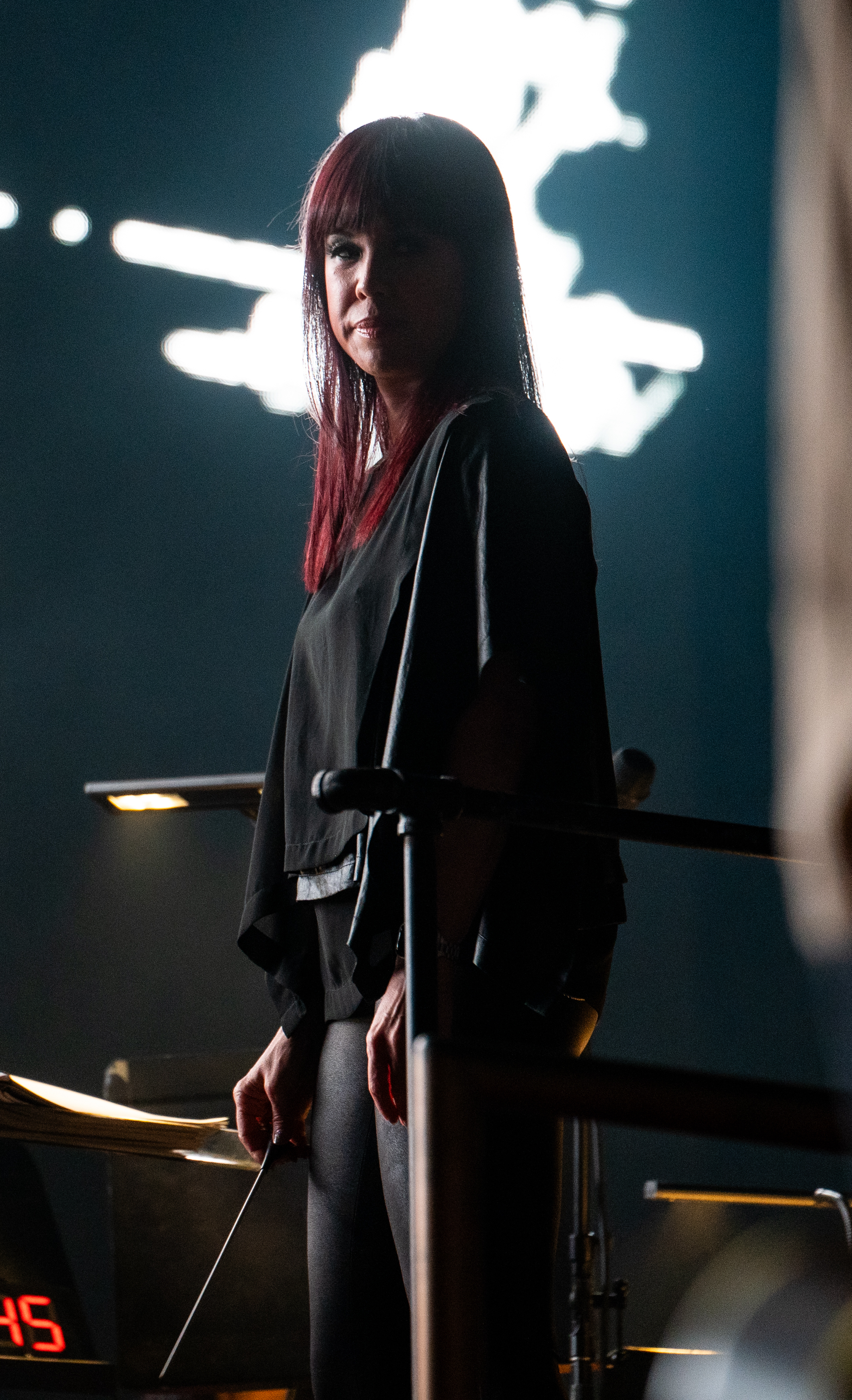
- Hicks in 2025
- Born: Sarah Hatsuko Hicks; 1972 or 1973 (age 52–53); Tokyo, Japan
- Education: Harvard University (AB); Curtis Institute of Music (AD)
- Occupation: Orchestral conductor
- Spouse: Paul LaFollette

Sarah Hatsuko Hicks (born 1972 or 1973) is an American orchestral conductor. Since 2009, she has been the Principal Conductor of Live at Orchestra Hall for the Minnesota Orchestra, and also serves as Staff Conductor at the Curtis Institute of Music.

== Early life and education ==
Hicks was born in Tokyo. Her father Richard was an American lawyer and her mother Kazuko was a classical Japanese dancer. She grew up in Honolulu, Hawaii, where she learned violin and piano, graduating from the Punahou School in 1989. In 1993, Hicks graduated magna cum laude from Harvard University with an Bachelor of Arts degree in music, winning the Thomas Hoopes Prize for undergraduate theses and the Doris Cohen Levy Prize for conducting. She then studied at the Curtis Institute of Music, winning a Presser Award and graduating with an Artist's Degree in conducting.

== Career ==
Hicks previously served as Associate Conductor of the North Carolina Symphony, Associate Conductor of the Richmond Symphony Orchestra, Resident Conductor of the Florida Philharmonic, and Assistant Conductor of the Philadelphia Singers, the chorus of the Philadelphia Orchestra. After graduating from Curtis, she was for one season assistant conductor to the Verbier Festival Orchestra, training with James Levine.

As a guest conductor, Hicks has appeared with the Philadelphia Orchestra, Chicago Symphony Orchestra, San Francisco Symphony, Cleveland Orchestra, Boston Pops, Atlanta Symphony, Florida Orchestra, Los Angeles Philharmonic, Milwaukee Symphony, Detroit Symphony Orchestra, National Symphony Orchestra, Danish National Symphony Orchestra, Melbourne Symphony, Tokyo Philharmonic, St. Petersburg Philharmonic, Royal Liverpool Philharmonic, the Orchestra of Teatro La Fenice, the Orchestra Society of Philadelphia, and the Toronto Symphony Orchestra.

She has collaborated with many artists including Dmitri Hvorostovsky, Rufus Wainwright, Jaime Laredo, Hilary Hahn, Ben Folds, Smokey Robinson, King Gizzard and the Lizard Wizard, and Sting, for whom she served as conductor on the final leg of his Symphonicities Tour. In June 2012 she conducted the opening concert of the St. Petersburg International Economic Forum, in a program featuring Dmitri Hvorostovsky, Sumi Jo and Jackie Evancho. She has conducted some famous film music scores with the Danish National Symphony Orchestra, including a concert of masterpieces by Italian composer Ennio Morricone and his Dollars Trilogy, as well as works by Nino Rota. This concert was released in 2018 as an album and has been broadcast worldwide. Her other recordings include "Chime" with rap artist Dessa, as well as an album of new concertos, "Triple Doubles".

Hicks is a specialist in the live to film genre and since 2019 has been a consultant for Disney Concerts. Her film concerts can be found on Disney+. She has also worked on an Intel gaming project with gamer DrLupo.

== Personal life ==
Hicks lives in San Francisco with her husband, horn player Paul LaFollette, whom she met while studying at the Curtis Institute of Music.
