= Charlotte Peege =

American singer

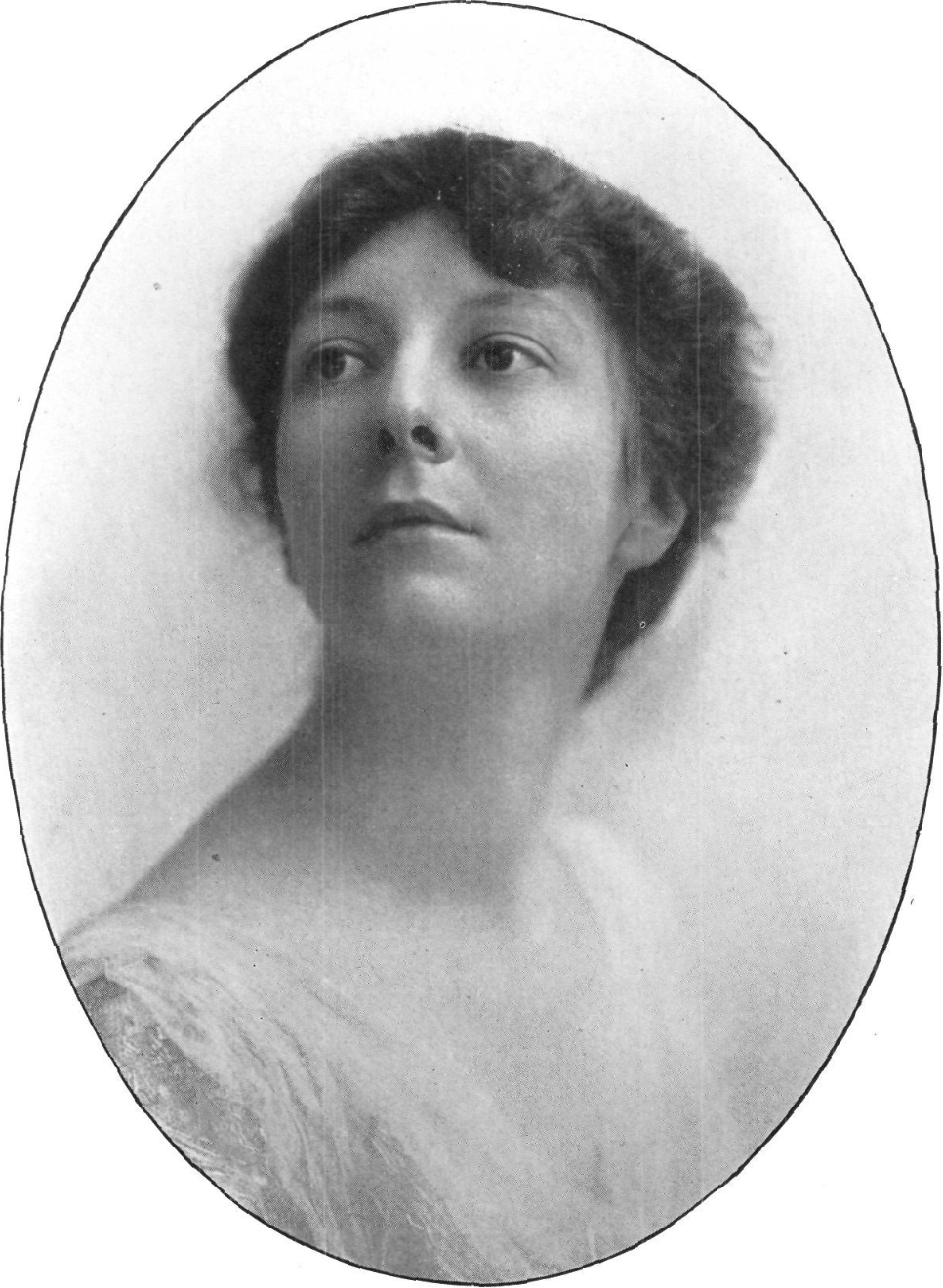
- Charlotte Peege, from a 1917 Chautauqua program
- Born: May 23, 1886; Milwaukee, Wisconsin, U.S.
- Died: April 18, 1981 (age 94); Orange, Florida, U.S.
- Other names: Charlotte Peegé, Charlotte Hollander
- Occupations: Singer, voice teacher

Charlotte Julie Peege Hollander (May 23, 1886 – April 18, 1981) was an American concert singer based in Boston.

== Early life and education ==
Peege was born in Milwaukee, Wisconsin, the daughter of Ernst Julius Peege and Anna Catherine Lipps Peege. She trained for a musical career in the United States, with Iva Bigelow Weaver.

== Career ==
Peege was a contralto singer usually heard as a soloist in oratorios, concerts, and recitals. "Miss Peege possesses a glorious voice under excellent control," noted a 1916 report. She was based in Boston, but toured nationally. She was a soloist with the Minneapolis Symphony Orchestra in 1915, with the St. Louis Symphony Orchestra in 1919, and with the New York Symphony Orchestra in 1920. She booked concerts in 75 cities for the 1921–1922 season, including joint concerts with harpist Philip Sevasta and pianist Florence Brinkman. In 1924 she sang at a benefit concert in Lynbrook, to raise money for an ambulance.

Peege taught voice as an associate professor at Marquette University's Conservatory of Music in the 1910s. She was also "an accomplished pianist". One of her voice students was Canadian tenor Lorne Grant.

== Personal life ==
Peege married pianist, music critic, and publisher Charles Harrison Hollander in 1917, in Boston. Her husband died in 1980, and she died in 1981, at the age of 94, in Florida. The Florida Symphony Orchestra was the principal beneficiary of their estate after her death.
