= Potirna =

- Village
- Location within Croatia
- Country: Croatia
- County: Dubrovnik-Neretva County
- Municipality: Blato

Area
  - Total: 1.6 sq mi (4.2 km^{2})

Population (2021)
  - Total: 48
  - Density: 30/sq mi (11/km^{2})
- Time zone: UTC+1 (CET)
  - Summer (DST): UTC+2 (CEST)

Potirna is a village on the island of Korčula in Croatia. Korčula is part of the Dalmatian coast and it belongs to the Dubrovnik-Neretva County. Potirna is part of the Municipality of Blato.

== History ==
Potirna evolved in the mid-19th century around several fertile fields on the far west end of the island. There are archeological remains of Gradine in Potirna, as well ancient Greek artifacts. The Gradine were built by Illyrians and were stone fortresses. Gradine are found in other parts of the island. Cultivation of grapes, olives and figs are Potirna's main agriculture product base. The village consists of Gornja Potirna and Donja Potirna (Upper and Lower Potirna). The local bays are Grdaca, Žalić, Garma, Nova and Slatina.

From 1940 to 1959 it had its own primary school. In its first school year of 1940–41, twenty-seven students enrolled. Antun-Tonko Sesa was their teacher, who was from the town of Korcula. During World War II the Italian army occupied Korčula (1941–43) and Italian was taught at the local school.

== Demographics ==
Austro-Hungarian census recorded a population of 56 in 1880. The population numbers were at their peak in 1931, a total of 228 residents. During the economic development of the 1960s a large number of residents from Potirna moved to neighbouring town of Vela Luka.

According to the 2021 census, its population was 48. According to the census in 2001, the village had a population of 21.

== See also ==
- Croatia
- Blato
- Dalmatia
- Illyrians
