= Sidney Rothstein =

American conductor

Sidney Rothstein (May 29, 1936-February 2, 2017) was a nationally known American symphony orchestra conductor and music director. Known for his expertise in audience development and orchestra programming, Rothstein served as music director of several professional symphony orchestras in the United States.

== Early life and education ==
A native Philadelphian, Rothstein's early musical training was as a violinist; he earned a music degree at Temple University. He studied conducting with Pierre Monteux at the Domaine School for Conductors, today known as the Pierre Monteux School. Rothstein received an Honorary Doctor of Music Degree from Combs College in 1975 and a Doctor of Humanities Degree from Albright College in 1983.

== Career ==
Rothstein co-founded the Orchestra Society of Philadelphia and served as its Music Director from 1964-1976. In 1976, he led that orchestra in a nationally broadcast performance of Gustav Mahler's Symphony No. 8 (The Symphony of a Thousand) to officially open Philadelphia's Bicentennial Celebration.

For thirty years (1976-2006), Rothstein was Music Director of the Reading Symphony Orchestra, where he improved the quality and raised the stature of the orchestra in the Reading community. Rothstein was the Associate Conductor of the Honolulu Symphony from 1976-1980, commuting from Reading to Honolulu for four years. In 1980, Rothstein was named Music Director of the West Virginia Symphony in Charleston. In 1981 Rothstein was named Music Director of the Florida Symphony Orchestra, in Orlando Florida, a position he held until 1985. Until 1985 he led all three orchestras. From 1996-2006, he was Conductor of the Ridgefield Symphony Orchestra, located in Ridgefield Connecticut.

Rothstein served as guest faculty at the Bard College Conductors Institute and was named as a "Settlement 100" honoree by the Settlement Music School in Philadelphia as part of the school's centennial celebration.

== Death ==
Rothstein died in Wyomissing, PA, on February 2, 2017.
