= Frank Miller (cellist) =

Principal cellist and music director

Frank Miller (March 5, 1912 – January 6, 1986, Skokie, Illinois) was a principal cellist, conductor and music director whose professional career spanned over a half-century.

== Orchestral career ==
Miller studied at the Peabody Conservatory and the Curtis Institute of Music, under Felix Salmond, and at age 18, joined the Philadelphia Orchestra. Miller played with the Minneapolis Symphony (now Minnesota Orchestra). His longest stints were principal cellist of the NBC Symphony Orchestra and the Chicago Symphony Orchestra. A 1950 segment of Miller playing cello in "The Swan" from Carnival of the Animals with an orchestra on The Voice of Firestone is sometimes shown on Classic Arts Showcase.

== Conductor and music director ==
Miller was conductor and music director of the Florida Symphony Orchestra, the Evanston Symphony Orchestra and co-founder of the Savoyaires. While music director of the Florida Symphony Orchestra, Miller helped start the Orlando Opera company. Miller also was associate conductor of the Minneapolis Symphony Orchestra and was director of the Minneapolis Pops Orchestra.

== Career highlights ==
- 1930–1935: At age 18, Miller joined the Philadelphia Orchestra, under conductor Leopold Stokowski.
- 1935–1939: He joined the Minneapolis Symphony as principal cellist under conductor Eugene Ormandy, also acting as associate conductor.
- 1939–1954 He was the principal cellist of the NBC Symphony Orchestra, under conductor Arturo Toscanini.
- 1954-1959 Miller was the conductor and music director of the Florida Symphony Orchestra, Orlando Florida
- 1957–1959: Casals Festival Orchestra in Puerto Rico, under Pablo Casals
- 1959–1985: He was the principal cellist of the Chicago Symphony Orchestra.
- 1962-1984: He served as the music director of the Evanston Symphony Orchestra.
- 1964: He co-founded the Savoyaires, a group dedicated to performing Gilbert and Sullivan operettas on Chicago's North Shore, with writer Lilias Circle.

He also taught at DePauw University in Chicago.
