= Florida Symphony Orchestra, Orlando =

American symphony orchestra

The Florida Symphony Orchestra (FSO) was a full-time professional American symphony orchestra based in Orlando, Florida.

The FSO was a member of the International Conference of Symphony and Opera Musicians (ICSOM) and its musicians were covered under the terms of a collective bargaining agreement between the FSO and the American Federation of Musicians (AFM). For 43 years the FSO was a significant cultural force, playing music for audiences throughout Central Florida. Unable to overcome financial difficulties and labor unrest, the FSO played its final concert in 1993.

The Florida Symphony Orchestra, organized in Orlando, Florida, was a separate and distinct legal entity, entirely unrelated to the Florida Orchestra which is based in Tampa, Florida. According to corporate filings with the State of Florida, Department of State, Division of Corporations, the FSO was organized and incorporated as the Florida Symphony Orchestra, Inc. (emphasis added). The FSO's legal address was located in Orlando, Florida. The Florida Orchestra is incorporated as the Florida Orchestra, Inc. whose legal address is in Tampa, Florida. See also the Tampa Bay Times reporting on the demise of the Florida Symphony Orchestra: "Blame passed around for Orlando orchestra's death.".

== History ==
The Florida Symphony Orchestra was founded in 1950 by Helen Ryan and Joy Hawley, with an initial projected budget of $30,000. Other civic leaders, John Tiedke, Bob Carr, Jessica Dyer and Rose Phelps, played critical roles in the creation of the FSO. Other notable early FSO supporters were Harrison Hollander and contralto, Charlotte Peege.

The FSO's first music director was Paris-born conductor Yves Chardon. During its initial seasons, the FSO sometimes performed at the Winter Park High School auditorium. Helen Ryan was the first president of the FSO. Ryan was a visionary, with a "battling spirit," who was much beloved by her orchestra and the Central Florida community. At her funeral at St. James Catholic Cathedral in downtown Orlando, musicians of the FSO, under the baton of Pavle Dešpalj, played a deeply moving musical tribute in Ryan's honor.

The FSO was the primary force in the creation of the Florida Symphony Youth Orchestras. The FSO likewise played a critical role in the creation of the Orlando Opera. Starting in 1958, the FSO sponsored opera gala benefit concerts in Orlando that over time evolved into the full opera productions presented by Orlando Opera.

Few recordings of the FSO survive; in 1962 the FSO and the Bach Festival Choir recorded an album narrated by Werner von Braun, conducted by Henry Mazer.

=== Expansion and growing pains ===
Over the decades, the FSO continued to expand. In 1971, the FSO performed 73 concerts and its budget had grown to $370,000. By the mid-1980s, the FSO employed seventy musicians for a thirty-nine-week season, with a base salary of $20,007, on a $3.9-million budget.

==== The Ford Foundation Symphony Program Grant – 1966–1976 ====
The FSO was among the sixty-one American symphony orchestras that participated in the unprecedented ten-year Ford Foundation Symphony Program. To encourage the growth and stability of symphony orchestras across the U.S., including Puerto Rico, the Ford Foundation invested $80.2 million to: (1) improve orchestra artistic quality, (2) strengthen orchestra finances, and (3) raise the income and prestige of the music profession in the U.S.

The Ford grant, part of the "Big Bang" of music philanthropy, represented the single-largest gift program ever devised for the arts. The Symphony Program infused cash into orchestra budgets throughout the nation resulting in increased orchestra seasons and musician wages.

The FSO received a $600,000 grant which enabled the organization to build its endowment, increase its season and attract musicians to the orchestra. But the FSO, like many orchestras, could not sustain the growth provided by the Ford Foundation Grant alone. By the late 1970s, to meet its increased operating costs, the FSO – like many orchestras – had depleted its endowment.

The FSO reached a financial crisis during the 1979–1980 season. The FSO was unable to make payroll and most musicians were released from their positions due to the FSO's inability to pay them. The collective-bargaining agreement at that time permitted the FSO to "... let musicians go in case of a financial squeeze".

The FSO musicians renegotiated their contract at a substantial loss because the FSO removed the payroll-financial-hardship provision from the collective-bargaining agreement, hired a new general manager and recruited a stronger board of directors.

To support a full-time professional orchestra going forward, however, the FSO would need stronger corporate support and a quality performing-arts facility to replace the outdated Carr Performing Arts Centre, known for its poor acoustics and inconvenient physical location.

=== Music directors ===
- Yves Chardon 1950-1954
- Frank Miller 1954-1959
- Henry Mazer 1959-1966
- Hermann Hertz
- Pavle Dešpalj 1970- 1981 (see reference in Orlando Sentinel article to Dešpalj's resignation from the FSO in 1981)
- Sidney Rothstein 1981-1985
- Kenneth Jean 1986-1993

In 1986, the FSO auditioned four conductors to succeed Sidney Rothstein as FSO Music Director: Kenneth Jean, Jahja Ling, Andrew Litton and George Manahan

=== Associate and resident conductors ===
- Carter Nice
- Yuri Krasnopolski 1966–1967
- Joseph Kreines
- Maria Tunicka 1973-1975
- Alfred Savia 1978-1985
- Michael Krajewski 1986-
- Andrews Sill

=== FSO musicians ===
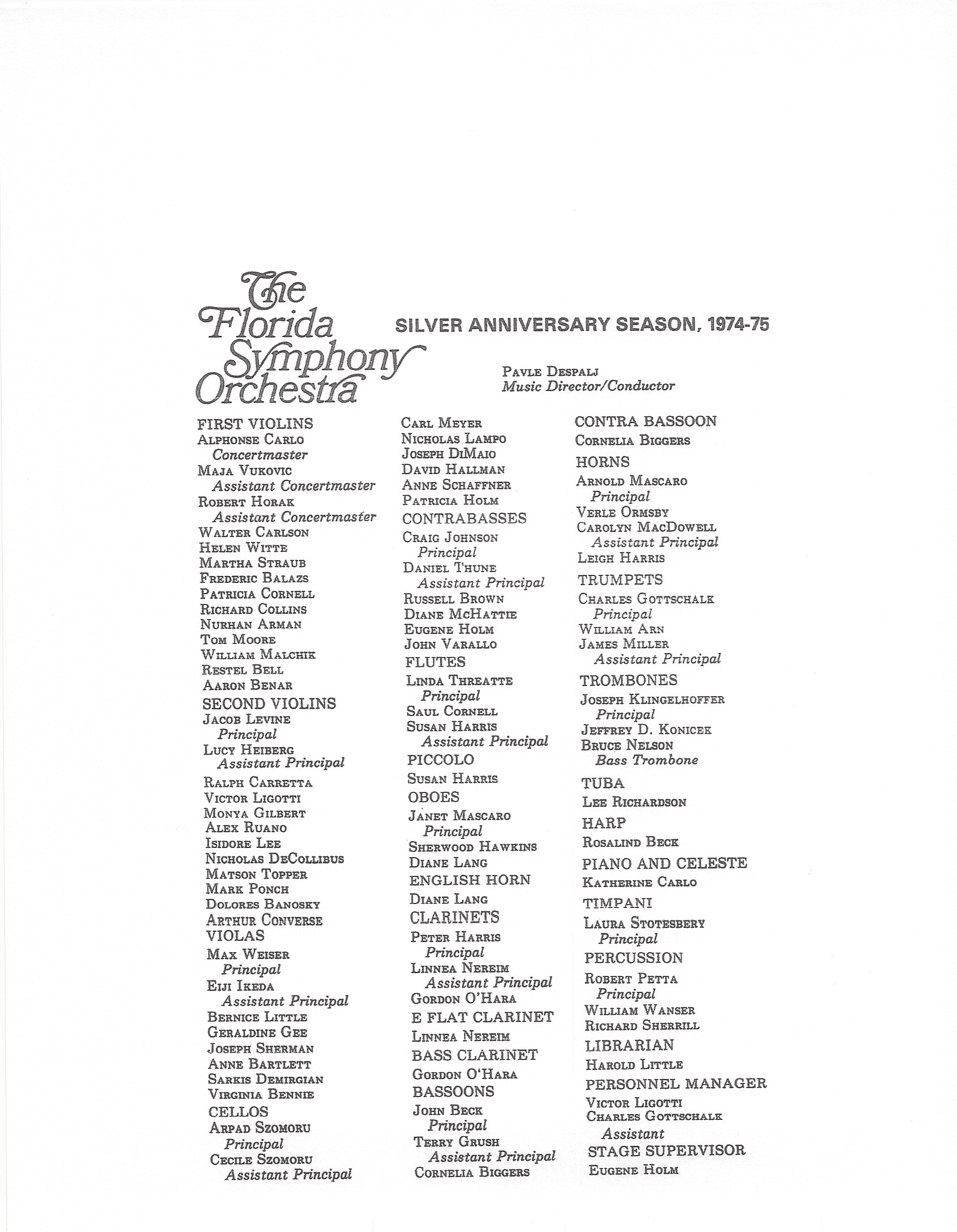

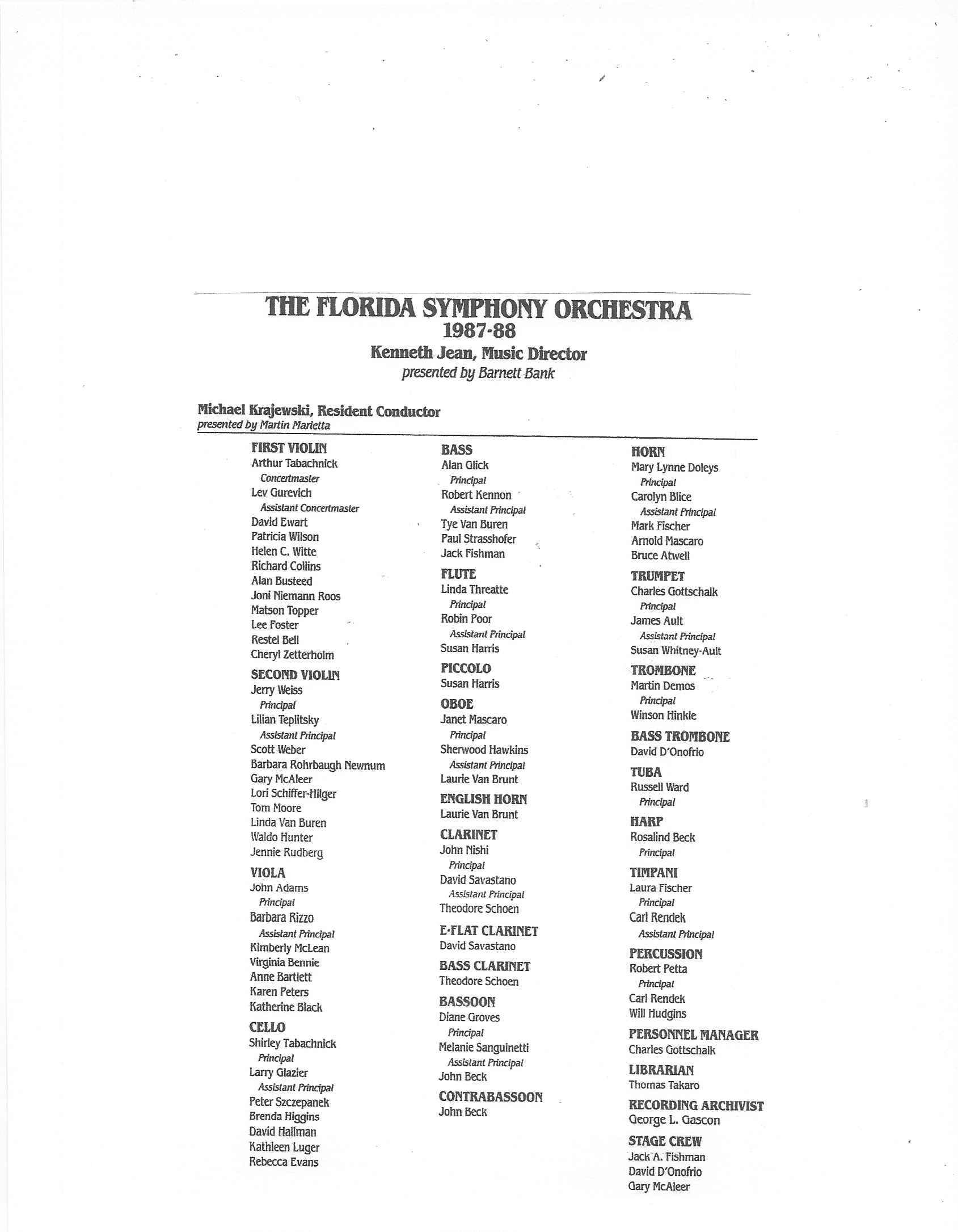

=== FSO board of directors and administration ===
Executive directors

- Robert Sanders
- Robert Gross
- Robert Sandla
- George Alexsovich
- Benjamin Greene

== Concerts ==
The FSO season included, among other concert series, a subscription Masterworks Classical Music Series at the Carr Performing Arts Center, the Chamber Music Series at St. John Lutheran Church, Winter Park, the Champagne Pops Series performed at both the Hyatt Regency Grand Cypress and the Carr Performing Arts Center, the Light Side Series, the Winter Park Art Festival, the annual Springs Concert as well as Young People's Concerts.

In addition, the FSO was the resident orchestra for the Bach Festival Society of Winter Park from 1953 to 1991, the orchestra for the Orlando Opera and the orchestra for Southern Ballet Theatre's annual performances of Tchaikovsky's Nutcracker ballet. FSO musicians often performed in chamber music concerts throughout the community. Outside of Orlando, the FSO played an annual 6-concert Masterworks series in Daytona Beach in the Peabody Auditorium, and served at times, as the orchestra for the Palm Beach Opera. The FSO also could be heard in concerts in Ocala, Mt.Dora, Leesburg and Lakeland.

After 43 years of playing music in Orlando and throughout Central Florida, the Florida Symphony Orchestra played its last concert on 2 April 1993, after its board of directors voted to dissolve the organization. For its final concert, the FSO backed Victor Borge in a pops concert at the Carr Performing Arts Center.

== Orchestra labor relations ==
The FSO musicians were represented by the American Federation of Musicians, Local 389 Orlando. The orchestra was a member of the International Conference of Symphony and Opera Musicians (ICSOM).

During the FSO's 43-year history, the musicians of the FSO engaged in two labor actions.

=== 1984 strike ===
In November 1984, the FSO musicians went on strike for higher salaries and a longer season. The musicians went on strike after the FSO board of directors withdrew its own 3-year contract offer that had been agreed upon at the negotiating table and ratified by the musicians. The AFM filed an unfair labor practice with the NLRB. The strike ended after one week when the board's original 3-year offer was reinstated by the FSO leadership. The AFM dropped the unfair labor charges. The resulting 3-year agreement increased the FSO's season from 32 weeks to 39 weeks.

=== 1990–1991 strike ===
In October 1990, the FSO musicians went on strike seeking higher wages, a retirement plan and improved benefits to include dependent health care coverage for musician families. The bitter strike lasted 17 weeks and ended when the musicians ultimately accepted an offer from the FSO that the musicians had previously rejected. During the strike dozens of concerts in Orlando and Central Florida were cancelled, the annual performance of the Tchaikovsky Nutcracker ballet by the Southern Ballet was performed without the FSO providing live music, recorded music being substituted. The musicians of the FSO, however, continued to perform as the orchestra for the Orlando Opera having negotiated a separate agreement with the Orlando Opera for the duration of the strike. To ensure visibility in the community during the strike, the FSO musicians also played free concerts throughout Central Florida, including a Tribute to Leonard Bernstein concert, featuring Glenn Dicterow, then Concertmaster of the New York Philharmonic, who graciously donated his time and services. During the strike, the Florida Symphony Orchestra filed for bankruptcy protection in federal court. In January 1991, the court granted the FSO permission to begin unwinding its operations. Once the FSO musicians agreed to return to work, however, (and upon court approval), FSO leadership, staff and musicians cooperated to quickly resume operations and begin performing concerts.

The four-month strike and near bankruptcy found the FSO at a difficult crossroads. The management and musicians had to resolve their internal differences and the FSO had to reconnect with, and regain the trust and support of, its audience and the Orlando business community. Audience participation had dropped. To improve communication and reduce tension between FSO leadership and its musicians, the FSO granted the musicians two seats on the FSO's board of directors - with voting rights. Among other things, the musicians volunteered to assist in the United Arts of Central Florida fund drive. FSO management staff had the difficult task to mend fences with patrons. At the same time, the musicians themselves were discordant about the outcome of the strike. Some musicians decided to leave the FSO taking leaves of absences to pursue other opportunities.

== 1993 end of operations ==
Because of financial problems, in March 1993 the FSO board of directors voted to shut down the FSO and cease operations. The orchestra played its final concert on 2 April 1993. ( See CONCERTS, above). The board decided to cease operations because it was out of cash. The FSO had no money to pay outstanding payroll, vendor and patron ticket debts. The musicians had not been paid in a month. The FSO's financial problems were attributed to a declining audience after the 1990–1991 strike, the location and poor acoustics of the Carr Performing Arts Centre ("...hall that killed the sound..."), lingering deficits and because the FSO lost part of its funding -$1million - from United Arts of Central Florida. United Arts prohibited its members, including the FSO, from hiring their own development officers or to sell corporate sponsorships. The inability of the FSO to operate its own development and fundraising program along with the lingering negative effects of the 1990–1991 strike were too much for the 43-year-old Florida Symphony Orchestra to overcome. (In retrospect the FSO's debts may not have been that bad. See footnote for Orlando Sentinel article ref/quote).

At dissolution, the FSO's estimated debts were $635,000 broken out as follows: $275,000 owed to vendors, $252,000 in wages owed to FSO musicians and staff, $80,000 owed to patrons, and $28,000 in unemployment taxes. Acting with care and foresight, with the leadership of Commission Chair Linda Chapin, the Orange County Commission unanimously voted to buy the Florida Symphony Orchestra's extensive music library that had been accumulated over 43 years. The County Commission's $50,000 purchase preserved the invaluable FSO music library for the future of symphonic music in Central Florida.

== See also ==
- List of symphony orchestras in the United States
- Music of Florida
