= Orlando Opera =

Professional opera company based in Orlando, Florida, United States

The Orlando Opera was an American opera company located in Orlando, Florida. Founded in 1958, the company ceased operations in 2009 because of financial problems. The opera performed multiple times a year in the Bob Carr Performing Arts Centre and other venues in the central Florida region. For many years, until its own demise, the Florida Symphony Orchestra was the orchestra for the Orlando Opera.

== History ==
The origins of Orlando Opera can be traced to opera gala benefit concerts sponsored by the Florida Symphony Orchestra. On February 13, 1958, the Florida Symphony Orchestra and the Junior League of Orlando produced the first "Gala Night of Opera" concert. Florida Symphony Orchestra's then-music director, Frank Miller, was quoted as saying:

"We are in the midst of the biggest season culturally in Central Florida, if not in Florida history."

Eventually, an Opera Guild formed with the support of the Florida Symphony Orchestra replaced the Junior League. During the Opera Guild's early seasons, only concert arias were produced, and then gradually staged opera scenes were performed. In 1977, the Opera Guild became the Orlando Opera. In 1979, the Orlando Opera Co, Inc. was established as a non-profit corporation.

== Performances ==
Early concerts under the sponsorship of the Florida Symphony Orchestra and the Junior League featured such singers as Placido Domingo, Jessie Norman and Beverly Sills. Roberta Peters appeared with the company in three different productions. In 1979, Orlando Opera began presenting its own full opera productions. By then, the company typically presented three full opera productions per season. In 1980, Luciano Pavarotti appeared before an audience of 11,000 at the Orange County Convention Center. In 1990, the company hired the striking musicians of the Florida Symphony Orchestra to ensure that the company's production of the Tales of Hoffman would include a full orchestra.

1991 Orlando Opera Program Excerpt

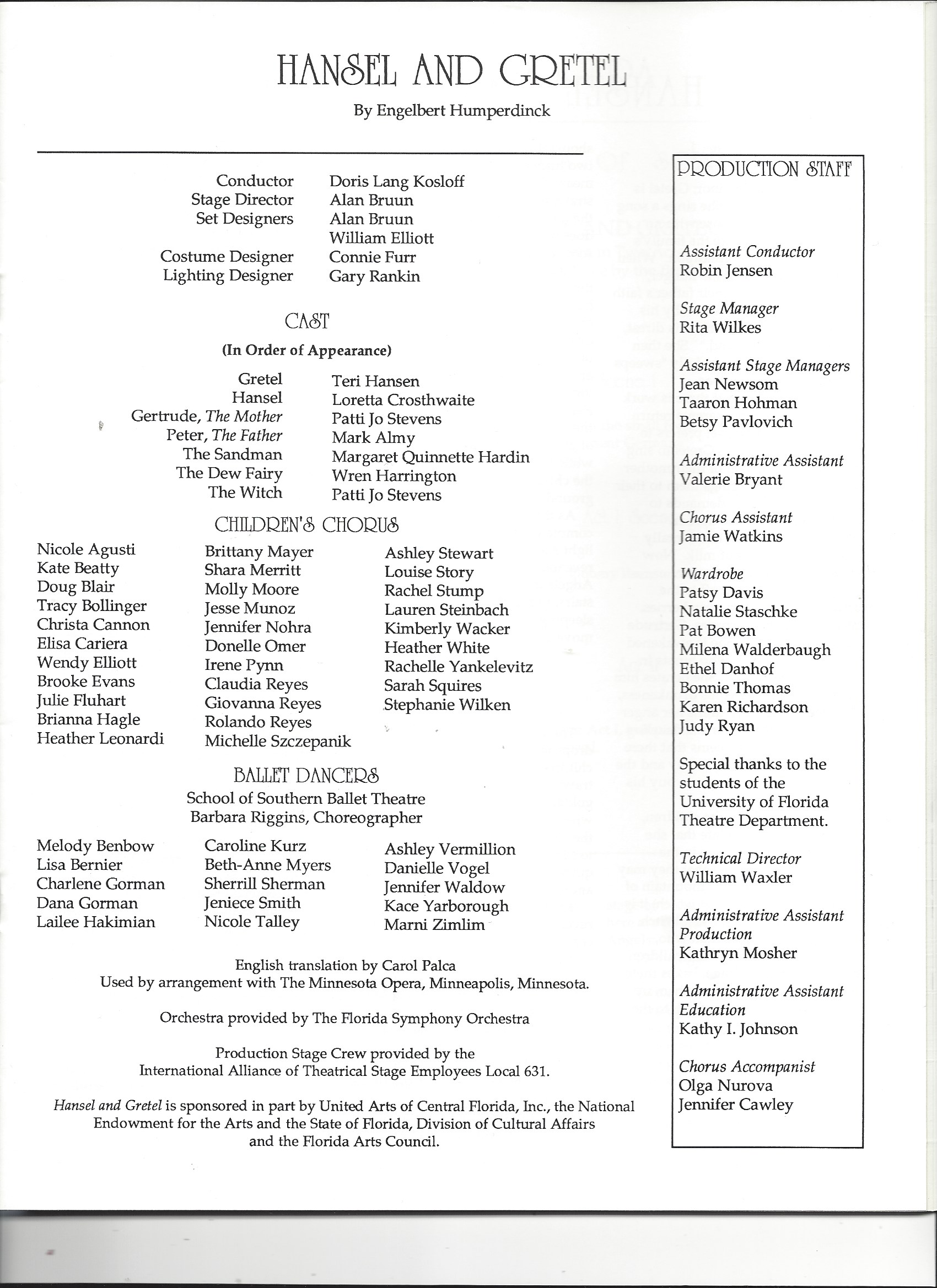

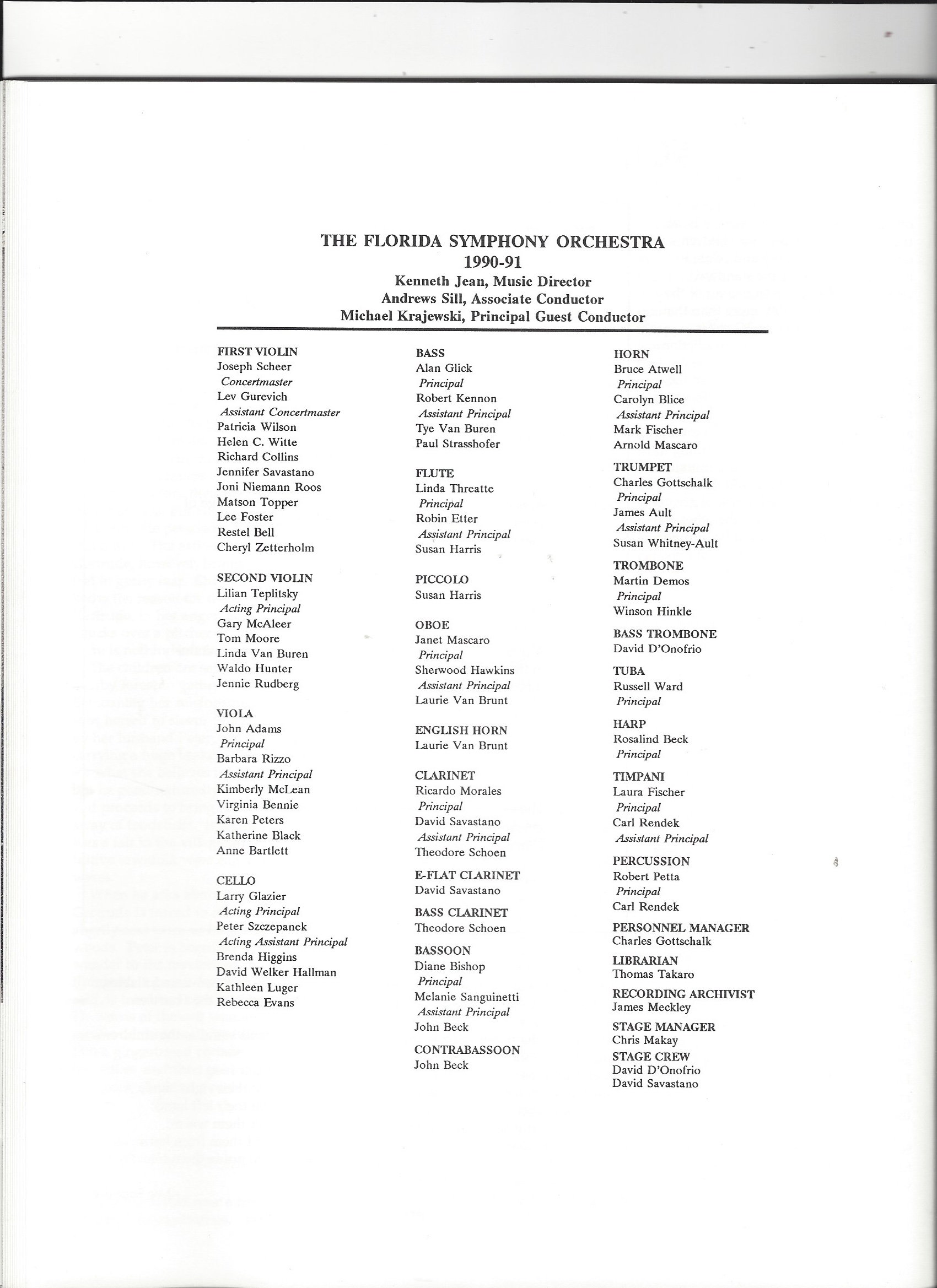

== End of operations ==
The 51-year-old Orlando Opera did not survive the combined effects of the 2008-2009 Great Recession and its own longstanding financial problems related to significant budget deficits. On April 16, 2009, the company announced suspension of all operations due to poor economic conditions. The Orlando Opera's board of trustees voted to file for Chapter 7 bankruptcy on April 24, 2009. The company had one remaining liability, $200,000 received from subscribers for the canceled upcoming 2009-2010 season.

=== General Directors ===
- Richard R. Owens (1984–1990)
- Robert Swedberg (1990–2007)

=== President & Chief Executive Officer ===
- Jim Ireland (2006–2009)

=== Conductors ===
- Frank Miller
- Pavle Despalj (Music Director, 1970–1981)
- Alfred Savia (Music Director, 1980–1983)
- Kenneth Jean
- Cornelius Eberhardt
- Maurice Peress
- William Huckaby
- Anton Coppola
- Karen Keltner
- Doris Lang Kosloff
