= Iva Bigelow Weaver =

American singer

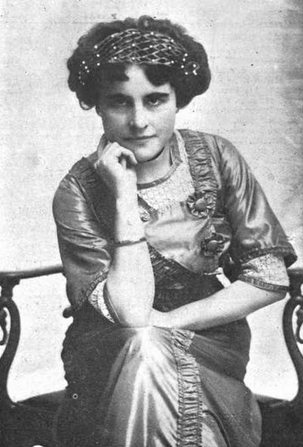
- Iva Bigelow Weaver, from a 1912 publication.
- Born: Iva Bigelow; October 8, 1875
- Died: October 4, 1932 (aged 56); Milwaukee, Wisconsin
- Occupations: singer, clubwoman, music educator

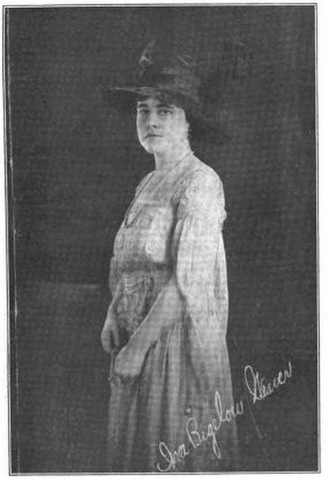
Iva Bigelow Weaver, from a 1922 publication.

Iva Bigelow Weaver (October 8, 1875 — October 4, 1932) was an American soprano in oratorios and recitals, clubwoman, and music educator based in Chicago and Milwaukee.

== Early life ==
Iva Bigelow was from Palmyra, Wisconsin, the daughter of Harry Bigelow and Lenore Stacey Bigelow. Her father died when Iva was a girl; her mother remarried to Arthur J. Thorne in 1889. She attended the Lawrence Conservatory of Music in Appleton, Wisconsin in 1894 and 1895, with further training in Chicago and in Europe. Her younger brother, Oromel H. Bigelow (1881-1966), became a mathematics professor at Whitewater State College, and the Bigelow Residence Hall on the Whitewater campus was named for him.

== Career ==
Weaver was a soprano soloist in oratorio and recital events, most often in the Midwestern and Plains states, but she sang in Los Angeles in 1915, and in New York City and on radio in 1926. She was also a regular soloist at the Evanston Methodist Episcopal Church. She also sang in a quartet on the Chautauqua circuit in 1912. "She not only sings well technically, but has that poetry and warmth which so many excellent musicians lack", commented one reporter in 1914. "Her voice is powerful, particularly sweet in the upper register and of splendid volume."

She was the Milwaukee correspondent for the weekly magazine Music News, and was active in the Musicians' Club of Women, a Chicago-based organization. She ran teaching studios in both Chicago and Milwaukee simultaneously. She was a judge for Wisconsin in contests sponsored by the National Federation of Music Clubs in 1917. One of her students was contralto Charlotte Peege.

== Personal life ==
Iva Bigelow Weaver died after having surgery in 1932, in Milwaukee, just before her 57th birthday. Her gravesite is in Waukesha County, Wisconsin. After her death, a music club in Marshfield, Wisconsin was named in her memory. The Iva Bigelow Weaver Junior Music Club of Marshfield lasted from the 1930s into the 1970s.
