= Taipei Philharmonic Orchestra =

Taiwanese orchestra

- Orchestra
- Native name: 台北愛樂管弦樂團
- Short name: TPO
- Founded: 1985
- Location: Taipei, Taiwan

The Taipei Philharmonic Orchestra (TPO; Chinese: 台北愛樂管弦樂團; pinyin: Táiběi Àiyuè Guǎnxián Yuètuán) is a Taiwanese orchestra based in Taipei.

== History ==
Taipei Philharmonic Orchestra was founded in 1985 by a group of enthusiastic musicians. It has come a long way under the direction of late American conductor Henry Mazer, who came from Chicago Symphony Orchestra and stayed with TPO for over 18 years.

In 1990, TPO undertook their first overseas concert tours to Europe and North America, with performances in France, Belgium, Austria, the United States, and Canada. Franz Endler, one of Vienna's leading music critics, wrote in the https://www.hotnewspapers.com/austria-newspapers/der-kurier/356/, "The ensemble plays with precision and unity... the Sinfonietta is of considerable quality... This conductor (Henry Mazer) made Schubert come alive and touch our hearts again."

In 1995, TPO embarked on yet another tour to the United States. One of the performances was given at one of the United States leading concert halls, the Boston Symphony Hall. The New York and Boston media showed with positive reviews. Among them, Richard Dyer, the editor of the Music Page of the Boston Globe, who wrote, "The first sound of the Taipei Philharmonic in Boston Symphony Hall was electrifying. The way the orchestra plays is a real tribute to Mazers musicianship. Mazer has a rare understanding of how Verklarte Nacht is constructed, how it should sound and the wallop it should pack. They play with glowing sound, precision of intonation, absolute unanimity of impulse and rare commitment."

In September 2001, TPO, led by conductor Lin Tien-chi, had a tour to Scandinavia to give two concerts in Stockholm, Sweden, and Helsinki, Finland. This event was the first time that a Taiwanese symphonic orchestra has ever been invited to perform in Scandinavia. In the following May 2002, TPO went to Germany and Czech Republic as a guest performer during the Prague Spring International Music Festival with Czech pianist Martin Kasik, followed by concerts at the Braunschweig Classix Festival in Germany, and the Janáček International Music Festival in the Czech Republic.

== Music directors ==
- Henry Mazer
- Alexander Rudin
- Chang Long-Yun

== See also ==
- List of symphony orchestras in Taiwan
- Henry Mazer discography
