= Henry Mazer =

American conductor (1918-2002)

Maestro Henry Mazer
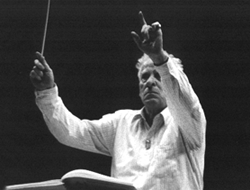

Background information
- Also known as: 亨利·梅哲
- Born: Henry Simon Mazer; July 21, 1918; Pittsburgh
- Died: August 1, 2002 (aged 84) Taipei
- Genres: Classical music
- Occupations: Conductor, recording artist,music educator
- Years active: 1948–2002
- Label: Jingo Records

Henry Simon Mazer (July 21, 1918 – August 1, 2002), was an American and later Taiwanese conductor, recording artist and music educator who was the founding principal conductor and music director of Taipei Philharmonic Orchestra from 1985 until suffering a stroke in February 2001. Prior to his move to Taiwan, he was the conductor and associate conductor of major American symphonies including the Chicago Symphony Orchestra. He contributed greatly to the refinement of the performances of classical music in Taiwan, leading local musicians to gain recognition overseas. There is a cultural center dedicated to him in Taipei.

== Biography ==
Born in Pittsburgh, Mazer was educated at Duquesne University and at the Carnegie Institute of Technology. Mazer chose conducting for his career early-on in his life, and became the protégé of renowned conductor Fritz Reiner. At Reiner's recommendation, Mazer conducted the Wheeling Symphony Orchestra in West Virginia from 1948 to 1958 and the Florida Symphony Orchestra in Orlando from 1958 to 1965. In 1966, Mazer was named Associate Conductor of the Pittsburgh Symphony Orchestra. Four years later, he received a last-minute invitation to stand-in with the Symphony when its conductor, William Steinberg, was taken ill. Held at New York City's Carnegie Hall, the concert brought Mazer to the attention of Georg Solti, who later asked him to be his Associate Conductor of the Chicago Symphony Orchestra, a position he held for the next 15 years. During that time, he performed with internationally acclaimed musicians such as Arthur Rubinstein, Isaac Stern, Andrés Segovia, Rudolf Serkin, Robert Casadesus, and Marian Anderson.

Mazer conducted hundreds of subscription concerts for the Chicago Symphony Orchestra, often substituting for Solti on short notice. Although initially described alongside Solti as the "new breed of virtuosi," not every review was positive: following his move to Taiwan, one Chicago critic described his performances as "dull readings." Mazer, however, would end up with no shortage of fans. In Chicago, however, he had seemed overshadowed by Solti, but was seen as dedicated and highly competent, taking on more avant-garde works neither Solti nor others would touch. Taiwan would be different.

Mazer was first approached about coming to Taiwan as a guest conductor during his term with the Chicago Symphony and agreed to visit the country for four concerts in the summer of 1985. After the success of the concerts, Mazer took on the challenge of developing a new orchestra in Taiwan – the Taipei Sinfonietta (later, the Taipei Philharmonic Orchestra). "I could not help develop the Chicago Symphony Orchestra any further, whereas in Taiwan I could see plenty of development potential", he said.

In 1990, Mazer brought the orchestra to perform in the United States and Canada. Music critic William Russo wrote: "The Sinfonietta is one of the finest groups of musicians I have ever heard". Gradually, such impressive reviews overseas would succeed in opening eyes back in Taiwan. During its image-building campaign abroad, the orchestra also toured Europe over the next couple of years, playing in Lyons, Brussels, and Antwerp. But the highlights of the various European concerts was their performance in Musikvereinssaal, home to Vienna Philharmonic Orchestra. Following the performances, music critics in Austria dubbed the orchestra a "wonder of Taiwan." After the Vienna trip, Mazer's orchestra enjoyed a surge in popularity back home in Taiwan. In addition, several CDs released by the orchestra met with brisk sales.

An overseas tour in 1995 brought the ensemble to New York and Boston. After the performance at the Boston Symphony Hall, Mazer received the greatest review of his career when Boston Globe music critic Richard Dyer compared him to America's beloved Leonard Bernstein. "The way the Taipei Sinfonietta plays is a real tribute to Mazer's musicianship. They play with a glowing sound, a precision of intonation, an absolute unanimity of impulse, and a rare commitment," he added.

Despite the international recognition, Mazer led a very simple life while he was in Taiwan. He got along well with his Taiwanese musicians, some of whom he worked with for a decade and were regarded as his own children. Mazer said he found Taiwanese musicians to be more disciplined than those in the West, and thus more satisfying to work with. He later said, "This wonderful island has given me the best musical experience of my life."

== Recordings ==
- 1950 - Henry Mazer conducting the Wheeling Symphony Orchestra in "pops" favorites of the Ohio Valley. / 1950 / 12" Vinyl / Blackcrest Records
- 1962 – Infinite Journey, Wernher von Braun / Johann Sebastian Bach / Bach Festival Choir / Florida Symphony Orchestra / Various Artists
- 1992 – TPO Live 1: Music With Mazer , various composers / Taipei Philharmonic Orchestra
- 1994 – TPO Live 4: Maestro Henry Mazer , various composers / Taipei Philharmonic Orchestra
- 2003 – TPO Live 16 , various composers / Taipei Philharmonic Orchestra

== Awards ==
In addition to awards and international critical acclaim for his music and recordings, Mazer was noted in Chicago for his contribution to children's concerts, including the CSO's Petites Promenades Concert Series, which held several performances each year, sometimes in collaboration with Lady Solti and composer Irwin Fischer. Mazer had already been actively involved in youth musical education in Orlando through the Florida Symphony Youth Orchestra while conducting the Florida Symphony Orchestra. In Chicago, Mazer was put in charge of the Chicago Symphony Orchestra's educational program and received press attention when asked to "revitalize" the CSO's youth concerts, working with Chicago's Junior League to raise funding for musical education. In addition to holding "miniconcerts" and lecturing in the Chicago Public Schools, Mazer helped bring "unprepared ghetto children" to concerts. Mazer won a Special Award for Music Education in 1986 from then-Chicago Mayor Harold Washington.

== Personal life ==
Although Mazer would be survived by several children from his marriage, Mazer lived alone in Taiwan after the death of his wife.

== Museums ==
The Taipei Philharmonic and Henry Mazer Music and Cultural Center in Zhongzhen District in Taipei was built in Mazer's memory. The lower level is dedicated to exhibits on the conductor. Visitors can view Mazer's former belongings, photographs, and listen to Mazer's music and videos on vinyl, CD, and DVD in listening rooms.

== Archives ==
- CSO Music Directors section, Rosenthal Archives at the Chicago Symphony Orchestra 24+ linear feet
- Pittsburgh Symphony Orchestra Archives
- Miscellaneous additional public and private archives
