= Nancy Naigle =

American novelist

- Born: July 29, 1962 (age 64); Virginia Beach, Virginia, U.S.
- Occupation: Novelist
- Writing career
- Period: 2011–present
- Genres: Women’s Fiction, Contemporary Romance, Small Town Love Stories
- Website: www.nancynaigle.com

Nancy Naigle (born July 29, 1962) is an American author known for her works such as Sweet Tea and Secrets, Out of Focus, Hope at Christmas, and Christmas Joy.

== Early life ==
Naigle was born in Virginia Beach but was raised in North Carolina. In elementary school, Naigle dreamed of being a zoologist. She wanted to design habitats for animals at the Washington, D.C. Zoo. However, after graduating from Virginia's Kempsville High School, she found work in computer technology and eventually joined Bank of America, where she worked as an executive vice president.

== Career ==
In 2003, Naigle began to pursue writing while working at the Bank of America. In 2011, she published her first novel, Sweet Tea and Secrets, a contemporary romance with a dash of suspense, which kicked off her popular Adams Grove series. Sweet Tea and Secrets hit the “Amazon Top 100” in Kindle Romantic Suspense, and Naigle went on to publish Out of Focus, book two in the series.

Before being published, Out of Focus placed in numerous contests: first place, mainstream/literary category in the Maryland Writers’ Association; first place, mainstream category in the CT The Write Stuff Contest; 2010 finalist, single title category in the Silicon Valley RWA Gotcha! Contest; 2010 finalist, novel with romantic elements category in the San Diego RWA Spring Into Romance Contest). Despite being the second book in the Adams Grove series, Out of Focus was written before Sweet Tea and Secrets and is the novel that catapulted Naigle forward in her writing career, driving her to continue pursuing writing.

In 2012, Naigle signed a four-book deal for the Adams Grove series with Montlake Romance, an Amazon Publishing imprint. Sweet Tea and Secrets, along with Out of Focus, were re-published by Montlake, and Naigle continued to publish four additional books to the series. In August 2013, Naigle's box set, authored with nine other authors, became a USA Today Bestseller. A year later, she took an early retirement from Bank of America to write full time, and has since penned multiple series such as the Book Creek Novels and the G Team Mysteries. It was book one, In for a Penny, of the G Team series that landed Naigle back on the USA Today Bestsellers list in June 2016.

In March 2017, Naigle's Christmas Joy sold to Crown Media and Hallmark for their holiday season programming. This kickstarted a current flourishing relationship with Hallmark. Christmas Joy premiered on the Hallmark Channel, November 3, 2018. A second novel, Hope at Christmas, sold to Crown Media and Hallmark and premiered, November 20, 2018. Naigle has also signed deals for the novelization of two Hallmark movies, Christmas in Evergreen (July 10, 2018) and Christmas in Evergreen: Letters to Santa (July 16, 2019), as well as an original novel, The Secret Ingredient (February 12, 2019) which aired on Hallmark Channel as an original movie in February 2020.

Nancy Naigle continues to write small-town romances and keeps her writing diverse by also penning single title novels, holiday-themed novels, short stories, and has co-authored a young adult novel. She is active in several writer organizations including American Christian Fiction Writers, Mystery Writers of America, and International Thriller Writers.

Naigle is represented by The Steve Laube Agency, LLC.

== Bibliography ==
Adams Grove Novels

- Sweet Tea and Secrets (2011)
- Out of Focus (2011)
- Wedding Cake and Big Mistakes (2013)
- Pecan Pie and Deadly Lies (2013)
- Mint Juleps and Justice (2014)
- Barbecue and Bad News (2015)

Boot Creek Series

- Life After Perfect (2015)
- Every Yesterday (2016)
- Until Tomorrow (2017)

Seasoned Southern Sleuths (formerly G-Team)

- In For A Penny (2020, re-release)
- Collard Greens & Catfishing (2020, re-release)
- Christmas Cookies & A Confession (2020, re-release)
- Deviled Eggs & Deception (2020, re-release)
- Sweet Tea & Second Chances (2020, re-release)
- Fried Pickles & a Funeral (2020, re-release)
- Wedding Mints & Witnesses (2020, re-release)

Christmas In Evergreen

- Christmas in Evergreen (2018)
- Christmas in Evergreen: Letters to Santa (2019)
- Christmas in Evergreen: Tidings of Joy (2020)

Main Street Romance Series

- Recipe For Romance (2019)

Stand Alone Novels

- inkBLOT (2011)
- Sand Dollar Cove (2015)
- Christmas Joy (2016)
- The Christmas Shop (2019, formally Dear Santa)
- The Secret Ingredient (2019)
- Christmas Angels (2019)
- A Heartfelt Christmas Promise (2020)
- Hope At Christmas (2020, re-release)
- The Shell Collector (2021) (in 2022 this story was released as Fox Nation's first original film.)
- The Wedding Ranch (2022)

Short Works

- Pretty Little Liars: The Path To Relaxation (2013)
- Pretty Little Liars: The Liars' Liar (2013)
- Pretty Little Liars: Secret Talent (2013)
- Wrapped Around Your Heart (2014)
- 50 Shades of Cabernet (2017)

Anthologies

- Wild Deadwood Tales (2018)
- Christmas Actually (2020)
