= Pavle Dešpalj =

Croatian composer (1934–2021)

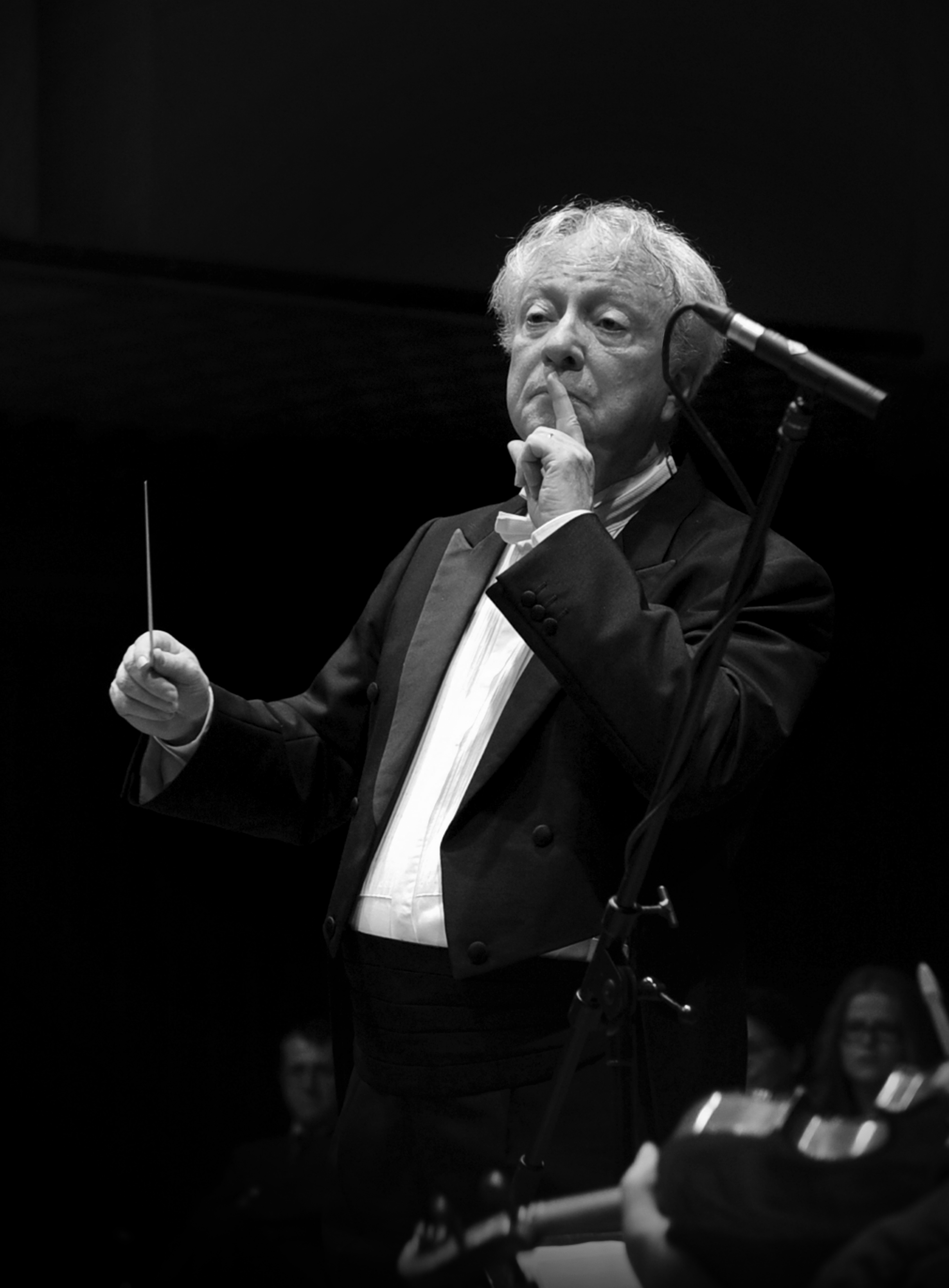

Background information
- Born: 18 June 1934; Blato, Korčula, Yugoslavia
- Died: 16 December 2021 (aged 87) Zagreb, Croatia

Pavle Dešpalj (18 June 1934 – 16 December 2021) was a Croatian composer and conductor.

== Biography ==
Pavle Dešpalj graduated from Music Academy in Zagreb where he studied composition with Prof. Stjepan Šulek. In 1961, he founded Zadar's festival, Music Evenings in St. Donat's, and the Zadar Chamber Orchestra. Between 1962 and 1967 he was the chief conductor of the Zagreb Radio Television Symphony Orchestra. In 1968 he began conducting the Florida Symphony Orchestra, Orlando and the Orlando Opera, and between 1970 and 1981 he was their music director. From 1981 to 1986 he was the principal conductor of the Zagreb Philharmonic Orchestra. From 1981 to 1983, he was the music program director of Dubrovnik Summer Festival, between 1987 and 1995 conducting professor at the Zagreb Academy of Music and between 1995 and 1998, conductor of the Tokyo Geidai Philharmonic Orchestra and professor at the Tokyo National University. In 1998, he became chief conductor of the Croatian Chamber Orchestra, and in 2000 took up the same post with the Split Chamber Orchestra. He was also a guest conductor of renowned Croatian orchestras as well as Croatian National Theatre's Opera and Ballet.

Pavle Dešpalj led Zagreb's orchestras on numerous tours around Europe, America and the Far East. He was a guest conductor of many prestigious foreign symphonic orchestras in Luxembourg, Toulouse, Milan, Frankfurt, Bratislava, Salzburg, Budapest, Bucharest and Tallinn. He also conducted the Royal London Philharmonic Orchestra, Moscow's Russian National Symphony Orchestra, Novosibirsk Philharmonic Orchestra, Pittsburgh Symphony Orchestra, Chicago Festival Orchestra, Tokyo Philharmonics, Tokyo Symphony Orchestra, and Tokyo and Yokohama Operas.

He recorded for Croatia Records, Cantus and Opus (Bratislava), as well as for Croatian, Slovenian and Hessischer Runfunkt (Frankfurt) radio stations.

Dešpalj's most often played and recorded works are Passacaglia and Fugue for piano and strings, Three Choral Preludes for Chamber Orchestra, Variations for Orchestra, Concerto for Violin and Orchestra, Concerto for Alto Saxophone and Strings, Concerto for Cello and Strings and Two Fiddlers' Whims.

Pavle Dešpalj was a member of international juries for conducting competitions in Zagreb, Budapest, and Tokyo. He was the honorary guest conductor of theZagreb Radio Television Symphony Orchestra, lifetime honorary principal conductor of the Croatian Chamber Orchestra, honorary conductor of the Zadar Chamber Orchestra and the Varaždin Chamber Orchestra, an honorary citizen of Dayton Beach, professor emeritus at the Tokyo National University, regular member of Croatian Academy of Sciences and Arts and its vice president (since 1 January 2004).

Dešpalj died in Zagreb on 16 December 2021, at the age of 87.

== Awards ==
Pavle Dešpalj won numerous awards: The City of Zagreb Award (1965), Central Florida Council's award for achievement in science and art (1978), Milka Trnina Award (1980), Josip Štolcer Slavenski Award (1990), Vladimir Nazor Award (1992), Orlando Award (1993), Special recognition by the Croatian Ministry of Culture (1994), Porin Award (1997, 2002, 2005), Ivan Lukačić Award (1999), Croatian Ministry of Culture Award (2002), The Vladimir Nazor Lifetime Achievement Award (2005), Judita Award (2005) and The City of Zadar Lifetime achievement Award (2006). In 1996 Croatian President Franjo Tuđman presented him with the Order of Danica Hrvatska with the effigy of Marko Marulić.

== Selected works ==
- Concerto for alto-saxophone and string orchestra (1963)
- Concerto for violin and orchestra (1960)
- Concerto for cello and strings (2000)
- Passacaglia and Fugue for piano and strings (1956)
- The Ceremonial Parade for French horn ensemble and symphony orchestra (2001)
- Three Chorale Preludes for chamber orchestra (1957)
- Variations for orchestra (1957)
