= Florida Symphony Youth Orchestras =

- Also known as: FSYO
- Origin: Orlando, Florida, United States
- Genres: Classical
- Occupation: Youth Symphony Orchestra
- Years active: 1953–present
- Members: Executive Director; Abigail Tran; Music Director; Mr. Charles Watford
- Website: www.fsyo.org

The Florida Symphony Youth Orchestras (FSYO) is a music education program in Central Florida, consisting of six primary ensembles with nearly 300 student musicians. FSYO is the oldest operating youth symphony in the state of Florida and is believed to be the 3rd oldest in the southeastern United States. It was originally affiliated with the now-defunct Florida Symphony Orchestra.

Both new and returning student members are required to audition annually. Acceptance and orchestra placement is a competitive, merit-based process in which auditionees must meet requirements for consideration. The organization is under the musical direction of Mr. Charles Watford.

== Early history ==
In the early 1950s, Alphonse Carlo, who was both a Rollins College associate professor of music and the concertmaster of the newly-formed Florida Symphony Orchestra, recognized a need for a youth orchestra in Central Florida and worked for years to get one started. Although FSYO officially celebrates its founding as the fall of 1957, evidence supports that the youth orchestra was started 4 years earlier. In September 1953, Mr. Carlo convinced the Orange County School Board to partner with the professional Florida Symphony Orchestra to provide string lessons and a youth orchestra for the area students. The program included a "school" which offered free lessons on Saturday mornings for 1st and 2nd year string players as well as a youth orchestra for "those students who were sufficiently advanced." The first classes/rehearsals were held at Howard Junior High School on November 7, 1953.

The supporting co-sponsors changed a couple of times over the first 5 years of the fledgling program. The Orlando Sentinel stepped in as a financial partner in 1955 and was later replaced by Rollins College through its School for the Creative Arts in 1958. The strings school component appears to have been dropped sometime during the 1959–60 season, leaving just the youth orchestra which eventually was renamed to the "Symphonic Orchestra."

In 1962, the program gained considerable structure and support under the full wing of the professional Florida Symphony Orchestra and its music director, Henry Mazer. In 1980, FSYO became independent by incorporating as a non-profit and received its 501(c)(3) charitable tax status in 1982. Despite its legal and financial independence in 1980, FSYO remained closely associated with the Florida Symphony Orchestra (FSO) until the professional orchestra ceased operations in 1993.

== Decades of Support from FSO & Rollins College ==
In 1962, the program gained considerable structure and support under the full wing of the professional Florida Symphony Orchestra and its music director, Henry Mazer. Documents discovered in the Rollins College Dept. of Archives & Special Collections, show that while FSO provided the music staff and administration, the Rollins College School for Creative Arts provided the funding for the expenses of running the youth orchestra, including paying for conductor salaries, music, rent, janitorial, etc. Receipts and archive concert programs show that this arrangement continued for approximately 20 years from the late 1950s until the late 1970s.

== Name Changes ==
As evidenced from various old newspaper articles and archived concert programs, the youth orchestra changed its name 9 times since inception. All but one of the changes took place in the program's first 23 years. The earliest formation of the youth orchestra in 1953 was named the "Florida Symphony Student Orchestra." But by 1956, it was being called the "Florida Youth Symphony." Today's familiar name of the "Florida Symphony Youth Orchestra" came about In 1958. However, it didn't last for long.

In 1962, Florida Symphony Orchestra's new music director, Henry Mazer, fully adopted the struggling youth program and had it rebranded as the "Florida Symphony Youth Training Orchestra," and then later shortened it to the "Florida Symphony Training Orchestra." After Mazer left in the spring of 1966, the name was changed back to the "Florida Symphony Youth Orchestra" for a brief time. Next came new FSO music director, Herman Hertz in 1967, who promptly changed the name to the "Florida Youth Symphony" and then later changed it again to "Florida Youth Orchestra." In 1976, the name was changed back to the original, "Florida Symphony Youth Orchestra" and it remained so for 41 years.

In 2017, FSYO's board of directors voted to slightly change the name by replacing "Orchestra" with the plural, "Orchestras," to better reflect the current size & breadth of the entire program.

== Ensembles ==
- Percussion Ensemble - An ensemble composed of percussion students from all of FSYO'S classical ensembles. Students will have the opportunity to perform in a percussion ensemble while perfecting their orchestral skills. This ensemble is for students ages 10 to 20 (started 2022).
- Symphonic Orchestra - A full orchestra for advanced students (ages 13–20) of difficult orchestral literature (started 1953).
- Philharmonia Orchestra - A full orchestra created for intermediate to advanced students (ages 11–18) of orchestral literature (began 1981).
- Sinfonia Orchestra - A full orchestra for intermediate students (ages 9–15) of orchestral literature.
- Prelude Orchestra - A string ensemble for intermediate students (ages 9–15) of orchestral literature.
- Overture Stings - A beginning to intermediate experience for strings only (ages 7–14).
- Alphonse Carlo Band - This 18-21 piece ensemble of advanced students (ages 13–20) focuses on the study of big band jazz music, the theory behind jazz composition and improvisation.
- Joseph Wise Band - A 17-20 piece ensemble of intermediate-level students (ages 12–18) that focuses on the study of big band jazz music.
- Stringmania Summer Camp - 2-week summer camp for beginning to intermediate strings held each July.

== Summer tours ==
- 2025 - Japan
- 2024 - Chicago
- 2023 - Italy
- 2021 - Miami
- 2019 - China
- 2018 - New York City - Carnegie Hall
- 2017 - Munich, Vienna, Salzburg, Prague
- 2004 - Washington, DC
- 2001 - Munich, Interlaken, Prague, Zurich
- 1999 - Munich, Salzburg, Vienna
- 1997 - Australia - Sydney Opera House
- 1995 - Great Britain
- 1993 - Basel, Switzerland and Barcelona, Spain
- 1991 - Boston - Symphony Hall
- 1989 - New York City - Carnegie Hall
- 1985 - New Orleans - New Orleans World's Fair

== Music Directors ==
| Years | Music director |
|---|---|
| 2024-current | Charles Watford |
| 2021-2024 | James O. Welsch |
| 2021 | Raymond Chobaz (interim) |
| 2016–2021 | Hanrich Claassen |
| 2015-2016 | Matthew Davis (interim) |
| 2007-2015 | Andrew Lane |
| 2005-2007 | Harold Levin |
| 1998-2005 | Andrew Lane |
| 1994–1998 | Jonathan May |
| 1993-1994 | Andrews Sill (interim) |
| 1984-1993 | Joseph Wise |
| 1983-1984 | Gordon O'Hara |
| 1982-1983 | Alfred Savia (interim) |
| 1971-1982 | Charles Gottschalk |
| 1970-1971 | Pavle Dešpalj |
| 1967-1970 | Herman Herz |
| 1966-1967 | Yuri Krasnopolsky/Ward Woodbury (interim) |
| 1965-1966 | Carter Nice |
| 1963-1965 | Joseph Kreines |
| 1962-1963 | Henry Mazer |
| 1960-1962 | Edgar "Jack" Williams |
| 1957-1960 | Alphonse Carlo |
