= Wheeling Symphony Orchestra =

The Wheeling Symphony Orchestra is a regional orchestra based in Wheeling, West Virginia. Since its founding in 1929, the orchestra has performed at the historic Capitol Music Hall.

== Temporary relocation ==
In May 2007, the "Capitol" closed its doors unexpectedly, forcing the symphony to look for a new home. Temporary facilities were set up at the John Marshall Center for the Performing Arts and Wesbanco Arena. On September 25, 2009, the orchestra held its first performance, titled "A Homecoming", in the re-opened Capitol Theatre. The orchestra continues to perform at Capitol Theatre where it has introduced a number of innovations such as its "college nights" in which students presenting a valid, current college ID can attend a symphony performance free of charge. The symphony and some of its ensemble subgroups also perform at additional venues in the greater Wheeling area.

== Discography ==
- Henry Mazer conducting the Wheeling Symphony Orchestra in "pops" favorites of the Ohio Valley. / 1950 / 12" Vinyl / Blackcrest Records

== In literature ==
The Wheeling Symphony Orchestra and its then-conductor Henry Mazer make an extended appearance in Sir Yehudi Menuhin's then-widely read autobiography Unfinished Journey.
