= Bruce Ridge =

American musician

Bruce Ridge (born January 1, 1964) is an American symphonic bassist and arts advocate. He is the former chairman of the International Conference of Symphony and Opera Musicians (ICSOM) and a member of the North Carolina Symphony. In 2014, he was re-elected to a fifth term as ICSOM Chairman, making him the longest-serving Chair in the organization's history Ridge served as ICSOM Chair from 2006 until August, 2016.

In 2008, Ridge was invited by the Federation International des Musiciens to address the first International Orchestra Conference in Berlin, Germany. He was also invited to speak at the Second International Orchestra Conference in Amsterdam , as well as the third International Conference in Oslo. In March 2009, he was invited to testify before the United States Congress during a hearing on the Economic and Employment Impact of the Arts and Music Industry . Ridge's speeches and articles have been published in numerous countries, and he has been quoted in newspapers across the United States, as well as in the American Foreign Press.

As chairman of ICSOM, Ridge became an international leader on issues affecting arts organizations and met with countless orchestras across America, from San Juan to Honolulu. He served as a faculty member for many sessions of the League of American Orchestras "Orchestra Leadership Academy" as well as on the faculty for the League's music director search seminars. He has appeared as a guest speaker on the history of symphony orchestras in America at The Colburn School of Music in Los Angeles and Roosevelt University in Chicago.

Ridge began his professional career when he joined the Virginia Symphony at the age of 15, becoming the youngest member in the history of the orchestra. He later studied at the Curtis Institute of Music and the New England Conservatory of Music, where he graduated with Distinction in Performance honors. He has performed at Tanglewood, Interlochen, the Grand Teton Music Festival, and with the orchestras of Charleston (SC), Jacksonville, and Honolulu.

Ridge is believed to be just the second musician from a major American symphony orchestra to chair a music director search. He has also served on grant panels for the National Endowment for the Arts, and as a member of the City of Raleigh Arts Commission.

Ridge's double bass teachers include Lawrence Wolfe of the Boston Symphony, and Roger Scott of the Philadelphia Orchestra. He also performs on the bass guitar and solo jazz bass for the North Carolina Symphony Pops series. He has recorded two albums of original folk rock compositions.

On March 8, 2016, Ridge announced that he would step down as ICSOM Chair following the August, 2016 ICSOM Conference in Washington, DC, ending his tenure as the organization's longest serving Chairperson.

In 2018, Ridge published a book of his writings as ICSOM Chair, titled Last Year's Words, and Next Year's Voices: Essays and Speeches from a Decade as Chairman of the International Conference of Symphony and Opera Musicians

In August 2019, Ridge was invited to deliver the keynote address at the conference of the Symphony Orchestra Musicians Association of Australia, sponsored by the Media Entertainment and Arts Alliance, in Sydney, Australia

== Arts advocacy ==
- September 2008 interview with Polyphonic.org
- January, 2008 Editorial on the Jacksonville Symphony Orchestra lockout in the Florida Times-Union
- April, 2011 guest editorial in the Syracuse Post-Standard,
- March, 2011 address to 2nd International Orchestra Conference, hosted by Federation International des Musiciens, Amsterdam
- September, 2013 editorial in the Minneapolis Star-Tribune on the Minnesota Orchestra Lockout
- August, 2019 keynote address to the Symphony Orchestra Musicians Association of Australia

== Media profiles ==
- Feature profile in the Virginian-Pilot, August, 2009
- Feature in the Houston Chronicle, August, 2010
- Feature in the Chicago Tribune, August 22, 2012
- Q&A: National musicians’ leader Bruce Ridge on ASO’s future and necessity for “positive message”
