= International Conference of Symphony and Opera Musicians =

The International Conference of Symphony and Opera Musicians (ICSOM) is a Players' Conference of the American Federation of Musicians (AFM)

In 1962, members of US and Canadian orchestras began to meet and discuss ways they could communicate with each other, drafted bylaws, and began pushing the AFM for formal recognition of ICSOM as a conference of the AFM. Actual conference status was not conferred upon ICSOM until 1969. ICSOM's example and successes over the years inspired other groups to organize into formal conferences as well – the Recording Musicians Association (RMA), the Regional Orchestra Players' Association (ROPA), and the Theatre Musicians Association (TMA). ICSOM's Canadian members left ICSOM when the Organization of Canadian Symphony Musicians (OCSM/OMOSC) was formed in 1975.

Several books have chronicled the history of ICSOM, including More Than Meets the Ear: How Symphony Musicians Made Labor History by Julie Ayer (Syren Book Company) and The First Fifty Years of the International Conference of Symphony and Opera Musicians by Tom Hall .

ICSOM began tabulating conductor evaluations in 1967 and has nearly 600 different conductors in the database. An online Conductor Evaluation Program for ICSOM musicians to evaluate its conductors was launched in January 2018.

In March 2009, then ICSOM chairman Bruce Ridge appeared before United States Congress. His testimony before the House Committee on Education and Labor on the economic impact of the arts and music industry can be viewed on YouTube

ICSOM is also involved in supporting minority-group instrumentalists and currently contributes prize money to winners of the Sphinx Competition.

In August 2012, ICSOM celebrated its 50th anniversary in Chicago. A feature in the Chicago Tribune highlighted ICSOM's achievements and future plans.

Currently ICSOM's membership includes nearly 4000 musicians of the top 51 orchestras in the USA and Puerto Rico.

Each year delegates from ICSOM's member orchestras, along with AFM officers, meet to discuss current business and contracts.

ICSOM is a resource for symphonic musicians, with a purpose of promoting, communicating, enriching, supporting, and celebrating the arts.

Current officers of ICSOM are:

- Keith Carrick, chairperson (Utah Symphony)
- Paul Austin, president (Grand Rapids Symphony)
- Laura Ross, secretary (Nashville Symphony Orchestra)
- Peter de Boor, treasurer (Kennedy Center Opera House Orchestra)
- Mike Muszynski, editor Senza Sordino (Indianapolis Symphony Orchestra)
- Nicole Jordan, member-at-large (Philadelphia Orchestra)
- Jessica Phillips, member-at-large (Metropolitan Opera Orchestra)
- Rob Schumitzsky, member-at-large (Pacific Symphony)
- Kimberly Tichenor, member-at-large (Louisville Orchestra)
- General Counsel: Kevin Case
