= Women of the Fur Trade =

2020 Canadian play written by Frances Koncan

- Written by: Frances Koncan
- Characters: Marie-Angelique, Eugenia, Cecelia, Louis Riel, Thomas Scott (Orangeman)
- Subject: Red River Resistance

Premiere
- Date: 2020
- Place: Royal Manitoba Theatre Centre
- Directed by: Audrey Dwyer

Women of the Fur Trade is a play by written by Frances Koncan about the Métis-led Red River Resistance against European colonisers. It premiered in 2020.

== Production ==
The play is written by Frances Koncan of Couchiching First Nation.

=== 2020 production ===
In the Royal Manitoba Theatre Centre's 2020 production that ran at the Warehouse Theatre, Cecelia was played by Liz Whitbread, Marie-Angelique was played by Kathleen MacLean, and Eugenia was played by Kelsey Kanatan Wavey. John Cook plays Louis Riel and Toby Hughes plays Thomas Scott.

Audrey Dwyer directed.

== Synopsis ==
Women of the Fur Trade is set in one room of a fort in Red River during the 19th century Red River Resistance. It features three women who discuss their perspectives on the changing world around them, European influence, the fur trade and the Métis leader Louis Riel. The three characters are Métis women Marie-Angelique; an Ojibwe Manitoban trapper, Eugenia; and a European settler, Cecelia. Marie-Angelique is a strong supporter of Louis Riel, Cecelia has a romantic crush on Thomas Scott, who is killed by Riel, and Eugenia cares for no men. The narration switches between 19th and 21st century language and perspectives, as the women talk about men, the relationships between Indigenous peoples and European settlers.

The play incorporates comedic elements.

== Critical reception ==
Women of the Fur Trade won the Toronto Fringe Festival Best New Play award in 2018. Journalist Stephanie Cram, reviewing the play for the CBC described it as a "fun and clever" look at Manitoba's history. Ian Ross of the Winnipeg Free Press described the play as "a timely, provocative piece of theatre written from a perspective and voice we need to hear."

== See also ==
- North American fur trade
- Bug, 2018 play by Yolanda Bonnell
