= Hope McIntyre =

Canadian playwright, theatre creator, and professor

- Education: University of Saskatchewan (BFA); University of Victoria (MFA)
- Known for: Founder of Sarasvati Productions

Hope McIntyre is a Canadian playwright, theatre creator, and professor. She was the founding artistic director of Sarasvati Productions and served as the company's artistic director until 2020.

== Early life and education ==
McIntyre was born and raised in Saskatchewan.

McIntyre obtained a Bachelor of Fine Arts in Acting from the University of Saskatchewan and, later, a Masters of Fine Arts in Directing from the University of Victoria. She proposed directing María Irene Fronés' Fefu and Her Friends as part of her MFA thesis project but was told by male faculty advisors that the play's feminism was dated and that it would be too difficult to cast given the large number of female actors required. McIntyre later trained at ARTTS International.

== Career ==
McIntyre worked at Rare Gem Productions, an international commercial theatre producer, in Toronto in the late nineties.

McIntyre founded Sarasvati Productions in Toronto in 1998 but moved the theatre company to Winnipeg in 2000. McIntyre founded Sarasvati's FemFest in 2003 expressly to amplify female voices. While working at Sarasvati, McIntyre directed several shows including Fire Visions: The Poetry of Bertolt Brecht (2002), Fen (2010), Vinegar Tom (2010), and Fefu and Her Friends (2014). As well, during her time with Sarasvati, McIntyre saw many of her own plays performed by the company. In 2020, Sarasvati announced that McIntyre would be retiring from her position as artistic director to focus on her position as an assistant professor at the University of Winnipeg. McIntyre was succeeded by Frances Koncan.

== Plays ==
- Hunger (1998)
- Trauma (1999)
- Revisionings (1999)
- Missiah (2000)
- Death of Love (2001)
- Ripple Effect (2008)
- Eden (2012)
- Empty (2012)
- Immigration Stories (2012) - written by McIntyre with the Immigrant Women's Association of Manitoba
- Jail Baby (2013) - co-written by McIntyre and Cairn Moore with Nan Fewchuk and Marsha Knight
- Giving Voice (2014) - co-created with youth in foster care
- Erica in Technoland (2014)
- Breaking Through (2017) - co-written by McIntyre and Cairn Moore

== Awards ==
Year	Award	Category	Result	Ref.
2006	YWCA/YMCA Winnipeg Women of Distinction	Arts and Culture	Won	
2007	Playwrights Guild of Canada Bra D'Or Awards	N/A	Won	
