= Carolyn Fe =

Filipino actress (born 1961)

- Born: August 1, 1961 (age 65); Quezon City, Philippines
- Occupations: Actress; singer
- Website: carolyn-fe.com

Carolyn Fe (born August 1, 1961) is a Filipino actress based in Montreal. She has released three full-length albums and an EP with the Carolyn Fe Blues Collective. Fe is also the recipient of 2018 Toronto Theatre Critics' Awards for Best Supporting Actress for her work in Calpurnia.

== Early life ==
Fe was born in Quezon City, Philippines. Her family moved to the US and then to Canada when she was eight years old, settling in Montreal.

== Career ==
=== Music ===
In 2008, Fe and the Carolyn Fe Blues Collective (guitarist Rami Cassab, keyboardist Tim Alleyne, bassist Oisin Little, and drummer Dan Legault) launched their first EP, 100%. Their first full-length album, Original Sin, was released in 2011. Following Typhoon Haiyan in 2013, Fe and the members Carolyn Fe Blues Collective held a fundraiser to support the Red Cross's humanitarian efforts. The fundraiser, held at the House of Jazz in Montreal, raised over $300,000.

In 2014, Fe released her second full-length album, Bad Taboo. Bad Taboo had 13 tracks and was recorded by Fe and the Carolyn Fe Blues Collective. The album featured performances from Guy Bélanger ("Whole Lotsa Trouble" and "Life’s Just That Good") and Shun Kikuta ("Bad Taboo"). Fe released her fourth self-produced album, Sugat Ko, in August 2018 after a four-year break from releasing music. "Sugat Ko" means "my wounds" in Tagalog.

=== Acting ===
In 2018, Fe played Precy, the Filipina housekeeper, in Audrey Dwyer's Calpurnia. She was awarded the Toronto Theatre Critics' Award for Best Supporting Actress for her work in Calpurnia. At the 2019 Toronto Fringe Festival, Fe played Lola (Note: Lola is the Tagalog language word for grandmother.) in Through the Bamboo. She played Manang Flor, the matriarch, in Jo SiMalaya Alcampo's Hilot Means Healer in 2019 at The Theatre Centre. In 2020, Fe was cast as Lola, the grandmother of the main character, in the Nickelodeon show Blue's Clues & You!.

=== Other ===
Fe formed the theatre company Altera Vitae Productions in 2007. In 2009, Fe directed Altera Vitae's production of Martin Sherman's Bent in partnership with GRIS-Montreal. Fe fronted the band DD Swank and sang under the pseudonym of Mama B for four years. During this time, she sang in French, English, and Spanish.

== Filmography ==
=== Television ===
Year	Title	Role	Notes	Ref.
2010	The Perfect Teacher	Rosa	TV movie	
2020	Condor	Carla's Mother	Season 2: Episode 8, "The Road We Take"	
2020	Meilleur Avant	Madame Z	Web series (French)	
2020-2024	Blue's Clues & You!	Lola	Season 2: Episodes 4 and 7, "Spooky Costume Party with Blue" and "Blue's Big Baking Show"	
2022	Work It Out Wombats!	Gabriela	"Hopping Helpers", "Sparkle Pants"	

=== Film ===
Year	Title	Role	Notes	Ref.
2015	The Saver	Lita		
2018	"Auring’s Words"	Auring	Short film	
2018	"In Loving Memory"	Zhu Jin	Short film	

=== Theatre ===
Year	Title	Role	Ref.
2009	Death and the Maiden	Paulina Salas	
2013	Marg Szkabula (Pissy's Wife)	Marg Szkaluba	
2016	Sylvia	Kate	
2018	Calpurnia	Precy	
2019	Through The Bamboo	Lola	
2019	Hilot Means Healer	Manang Flor	
2022	Three Women of Swatow	Grandmother	
2022	Uncle Vanya	Marina	

== Discography ==
List of albums
Title	Album details
Sugat Ko	Released: August 1, 2018
Bad Taboo	Released: 2014
Original Sin	Released: 2011
100%	Released: 2009

== Awards ==
Year	Award	Category	Work	Result	Ref.
2012	Lys Blues Awards	Best Blues Album & Associated Styles	Original Sin	Won	
2018	Toronto Theatre Critics' Awards	Best Supporting Actress	Calpurnia	Won	
