= Feminist theatre =

Theatre genre

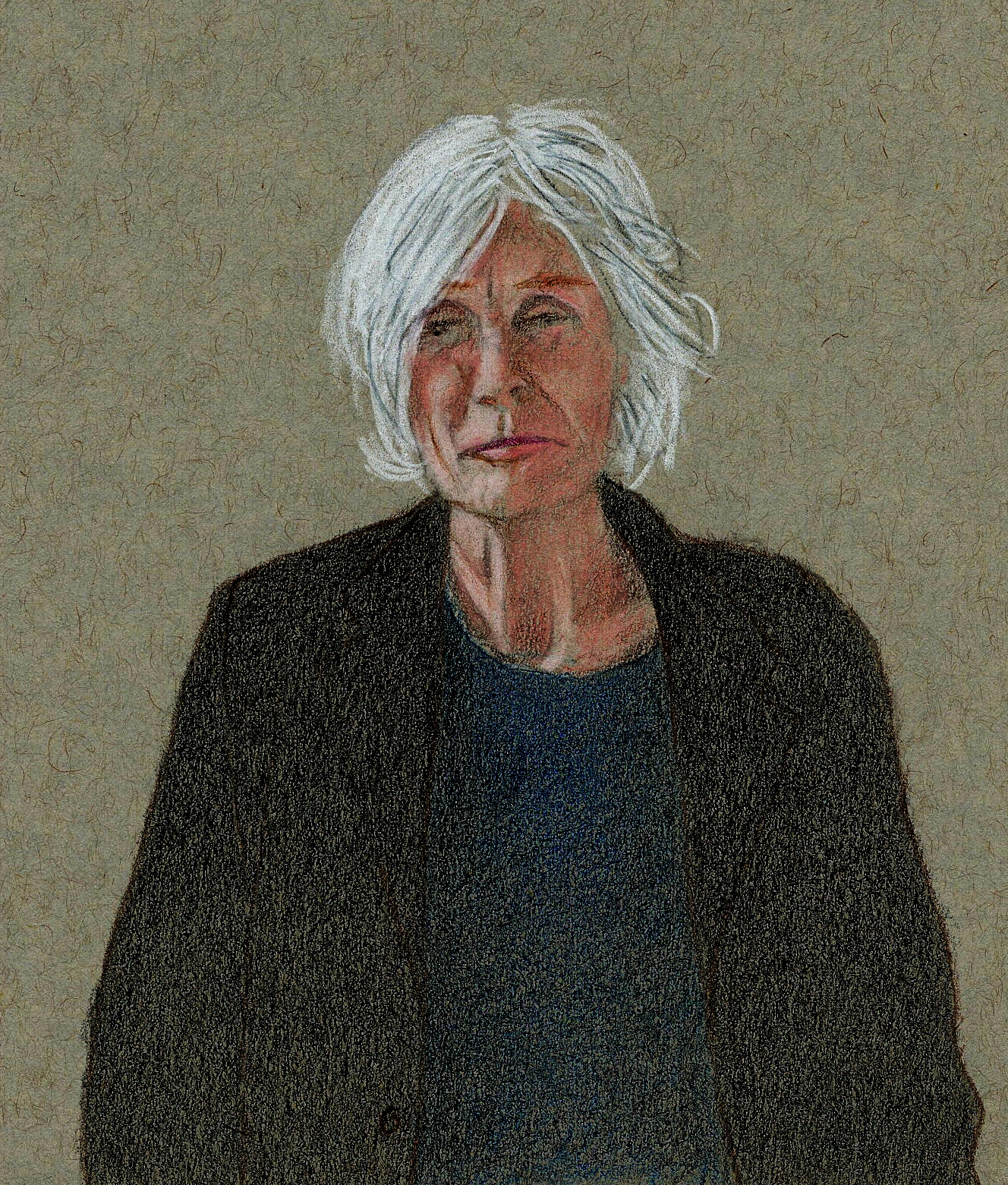
Portrait sketch of Caryl Churchil

Feminist theater grew out of the wider Political theater of the 1970s, and continues to the present. It can take on a variety of meanings, but the constant thread is the lived experience of women.

== History ==
Various women's theaters started up in the 1970s and 1980s, an outgrowth of the political and social activism of the times. Early leaders included Michelene Wandor, Martha Boesing, Caryl Churchill and The Women's Theater Group (renamed as Sphinx Theatre Company in 1999) in London.

During the 1970s and 1980s, feminist or women's theater was a specific, new type of theater. Since then, the theater genre itself has opened itself up to women's viewpoints. Some felt that it was no longer necessary to have a separate genre, because of increased parity. Many groups folded.

However, even with that increased parity, men's roles continue to outweigh women's roles in mainstream theater, and the situations and challenges women face continue to be severe. There are currently a large number of theaters again that are either explicitly feminist, explicitly women's theaters, or that define themselves as inclusive of women's perspectives specifically.

== Variability ==
Feminist theater defies definition because, by its nature, it is about breaking boundaries and experimentation. Catherine Castellani says, "Historical play, science fiction, any class, any race, experimental or straight-forward, there is no formula for a feminist play because there is no formula for how to be human."

== Global ==
The Women's Movement resulted in feminist theatre around the U.S., in England, and in other parts of the world in the 1970s, and it has continued to be a global genre ever since. One of the earliest feminist theatre's in England was the Sphinx Theatre Company (originally called the Women's Theatre Group). Another theater in Adelaide that started in the 1970s also called itself the Women's Theatre Group. The oldest feminist theatre in the United States is Spiderwoman Theatre, a Native American Theatre founded in 1976.

There are numerous feminist theatre companies around the globe, and although most tend to be situated in major Western cities (New York City, Chicago, London), the majority of them produce works based in the intersections of women of color and LGBTQ women. Some of them also raise money for prevention of violence against women. Some examples include the Manhattan Shakespeare Project, La Luna Productions, LezCab, Women Center Stage Festival, The Dirty Blondes Theater Company, and Teatro Luna.

Numerous theatres tend to focus on specific cultural performance traditions, such as La Luna Productions, which does modern works with primarily female characters, but uses the Japanese theatrical style Kabuki.

=== In Canada ===
Canada's oldest feminist theatre company is the Toronto-based Nightwood Theatre, formed in 1979. Nightwood was not originally founded as a feminist theatre but eventually garnered a reputation for producing female-centred shows. Other Canadian feminist theatre companies include Toronto's Company of Sirens and The Clichettes, Quebec's Théâtre Expérimental des Femmes (since rebranded as Théâtre Espace Go), Imago Theatre, and Le Theatre Parminou, Winnipeg's Sarasvati Productions and Nellie McClung, Calgary's Urban Curvz (later rebranded as Handsome Alice) and Maenad Theatre, and Hamilton's Half the Sky Feminist Theatre. Many of Canada's earliest feminist theatre companies, including Nightwood, Company of Sirens, and Urban Curvz, were founded as collectives. Canada has also been home to several annual feminist theatre festivals including FemFest, Women in View and the Groundswell Festival.

=== In India ===
Feminist theatre rose to prominence in India in the 1970s. In the late 70s and early 80s, much of the feminist theatre of India was street theatre. Beginning in the 1980s, women began to take on the traditionally male roles of playwright and theatre director. Some of India's feminist theatre companies include Jana Natya Manch and Sampurna Trust. India has hosted a number of feminist theatre festivals including Akka, the National Women's Theatre Festival (in Mysore in 2001), National Women's Theatre Festival (organized by Prithvi Theatre), and the National Workshop on Women.

=== In the United Kingdom ===
One of the United Kingdom's earliest feminist theatre groups, The Women's Street Theatre Group, was founded in 1970 and garnered national attention for interrupting the broadcast of the 1970 Miss World competition at the Royal Albert Hall. Many early members of The Women's Street Theatre Group and similar UK-based feminist theatre groups in the early 1970s had little to no formal theatre training. The first Women's Theatre Festival was held in 1973 in London to support emerging feminist theatre companies in the area. The Women's Theatre Group was founded in 1974 and the Monstrous Regiment Theatre Company was formed the following year.

Many influential British feminist plays received their first performances including but not limited to Claire Luckham and Chris Bond's Scum: Death, Destruction and Dirty Washing (1976), Caryl Churchill's Vinegar Tom (1976), and Pam Gems's Queen Christina (1977). Other UK-based feminist theatre companies include Clean Break, Mrs. Worthington's Daughters, Cunning Stunts, Siren, Scarlet Harlets, Burnt Bridges Theatre Company, Blood Group, Little Women, RashDash, and Sensible Footwear.

== Challenges ==
Feminist theatre faces internal and external challenges, starting with variable meanings of the word feminist. Since its onset, there have been additional direct challenges relating to funding, media backlash, and fit within existing theater contexts. Third wave feminism had different goals and methods than second wave feminism. The goals of feminist theatre continue to be extreme, including exploration of social injustices and inequalities in order to identify transformative possibilities and solutions. Today, gender privilege and bias continue to be both the subject and the challenge for feminist theatre.
