= Death and the Maiden (play) =

1990 play by Ariel Dorfman

- Original language: Spanish
- Written by: Ariel Dorfman
- Subject: The aftereffects of psychological damage on people in a country emerging from a totalitarian dictatorship.
- Genre: Drama
- Setting: Present day; a beach house in Chile

Premiere
- Date: 9 July 1991
- Place: Royal Court Theatre; London

Death and the Maiden (Spanish: La muerte y la doncella) is a 1990 play by Chilean playwright Ariel Dorfman. Set in an unspecified country that has recently transitioned from a dictatorship to a democratic government, it depicts the conflict between a former political prisoner, a doctor who may have tortured her, and her husband who is a lawyer and a member of the investigation commission of the new government. The play was translated into English by the author.

The world premiere was performed at the Royal Court Theatre in London on 9 July 1991, directed by Lindsay Posner. In 1994, the play was adapted into a film of the same name, directed by Roman Polanski and starring Sigourney Weaver and Ben Kingsley.

== Synopsis ==
Paulina Salas is a former political prisoner from an unnamed Latin American country who was raped by her captors, including a sadistic doctor whose face she never saw. During her torture, the doctor played Schubert's String Quartet No. 14, subtitled Death and the Maiden.

Years later, after the repressive regime has fallen, Paulina lives in an isolated country house with her husband, Gerardo Escobar. When Gerardo returns home from a visit to the president, he gets a flat tire and is helped by a stranger named Dr. Miranda. Later that night, Dr. Miranda returns and Paulina recognizes his voice and mannerisms as that of her rapist. She takes him captive in order to put him on trial and extract a confession from him.

Gerardo acts as Dr. Miranda's lawyer and attempts to save his life, but after hearing the full story of Paulina's captivity, he formulates a confession with Dr. Miranda based on the specific details Paulina shared with him. Paulina records the entire confession and has Dr. Miranda sign it. She then sends Gerardo to get Dr. Miranda's car so he can go home. While they are alone for the last time, Paulina accuses Dr. Miranda of being unrepentant and guilty beyond a reasonable doubt. She shares that she purposely altered small details of her story when sharing it with Gerardo, and Dr. Miranda corrected those details in his own confession. Although Dr. Miranda denies this, Paulina is completely convinced of his guilt and prepares to execute him.

The play then skips forward in time, and the audience sees Paulina and Gerardo attending a concert. It is never revealed whether Paulina ultimately killed Dr. Miranda. As the concert orchestra begins to play Schubert's Death and the Maiden, Paulina sees Dr. Miranda across the room cast in a "phantasmagoric" light, and the audience is left to wonder whether he is truly there or only in Paulina's mind.

== Background ==
Dorfman had worked as a cultural advisor to Chilean President Salvador Allende during his term in office. After the CIA-supported coup d'état in 1973 and the establishment of Augusto Pinochet's military junta, Dorfman was forced into exile. Pinochet's dictatorship embarked on a campaign of political repression and censorship, with an estimate of 32,000 people tortured, including 3,400 cases of sexual abuse of women. The military dictatorship ended in 1990 and was replaced by a democratic government over a transition period of two years, during which the National Commission of Truth and Reconciliation was formed to investigate human rights abuses occurring during the dictatorship.

Dorfman identified "the stark, painful Chilean transition to democracy" as the play's central theme, and in response to the play's mixed reception in Chile, stated that people "found it not to be allegorical at all, but realistic, and found themselves hurt or wounded by the brutality with which I show their lives".

== Productions ==
Prior to the 1991 world premiere, Death and the Maiden had one reading and one workshop. The reading was directed by Peter James at the Institute for Contemporary Art in London on 30 November 1990, with Penelope Wilton as Paulina, Michael Maloney as Gerardo, and Jonathan Hyde as Roberto. The workshop production was directed by Ana Reeves and was staged in Santiago, Chile on 10 March 1991, with Maria Elena Duvauchelle as Paulina, Hugo Medina as Gerardo, and Tito Bustamante as Roberto.

The world premiere was directed by Lindsay Posner and performed at the upstairs section of the Royal Court Theatre in London on 9 July 1991, starring Juliet Stevenson as Paulina, Bill Paterson as Gerardo, and Michael Byrne as Roberto. In February 1992, the production transferred to the Duke of York's Theatre, with a new cast featuring Geraldine James as Paulina, Paul Freeman as Gerardo, and Michael Byrne as Roberto. In August 1992, the cast was replaced by Penny Downie as Paulina, Danny Webb as Gerardo, and Hugh Ross as Roberto. With the same cast and director, it was transferred to the main stage at The Royal Court on 4 November 1991.

The American Broadway premiere of Death and the Maiden opened at the Brooks Atkinson Theatre on 17 March 1992, produced by Roger Berlind, Gladys Nederlander and Frederick Zollo, in association with Thom Mount and Bonnie Timmermann. The American production was directed by Mike Nichols and starred Glenn Close as Paulina, Richard Dreyfuss as Gerardo, and Gene Hackman as Roberto.

The Australian premiere production of Death and the Maiden directed by Neil Armfield took place on 16 December 1992, featuring Helen Morse as Paulina, John Gaden as Gerardo, and Frank Gallacher as Roberto.

The Indian premiere of Death and the Maiden (translated into Hindi by Shalini Vatsa) was produced by Asmita Theatre and opened at the India Habitat Centre New Delhi on 17 February 2002.

In 2011, Death and the Maiden returned to London's West End in 2011 at the Harold Pinter Theatre. It was directed by Jeremy Herrin, with Thandiwe Newton as Paulina, Tom Goodman-Hill as Gerardo, and Anthony Calf as Roberto.

Death and the Maiden was performed in Iran on 4 November 2015. The production was directed by Mohsen Sadeghian, featuring Nazanin Khoshnood as Paulina, Jafar Del Del as Gerardo, and Mohammad Babaea as Roberto.

In 2014, Death and the Maiden was performed at the Victory Gardens Theater in Chicago. The production was directed by Chay Yew, starring Sandra Oh as Paulina, Raúl Castillo as Gerardo, and John Judd as Roberto.

In 2015, Death and the Maiden was staged as a co-production between the Melbourne Theatre Company (from 18 July to 22 August) and the Sydney Theatre Company (from 2 September to 17 October). Susie Porter played Paulina with Eugene Gilfedder as Roberto.

On 22 March 2024, Death and the Maiden was staged at the Uganda National Theatre. It was the first theatrical production by the film company Railroad Pictures, and was directed by Timosewo Baguma who also played Roberto. The cast featured Namara Jolly as Paulina, and Kyobe Jerom and Busingye Emmanuel as Gerardo.

== Adaptations ==
=== Film ===
In 1994, Roman Polanski directed a film adaptation of the work, starring Sigourney Weaver, Ben Kingsley and Stuart Wilson.

=== Opera ===
An opera based on the play has been composed by Jonas Forssell with the libretto by Ariel Dorfman. The world premiere was staged at the Malmö Opera on 20 September 2008.

== Reception ==
Reviewing the 1992 Broadway production, Frank Rich from The New York Times described the play "as tautly constructed as a mousetrap" and stated, "[w]hat makes "Death and the Maiden" ingenious is his ability to raise such complex issues within a thriller that is full of action and nearly devoid of preaching." However, he criticized the actors' performances as superficial and overly controlled.

=== Awards ===
- 1992 Laurence Olivier Award for Best New Play
