= Bonnie Timmermann =

American film producer

- Born: Bonnie J. Golub; December 1947 (age 78); Manhattan, New York, U.S.
- Occupations: casting director, producer
- Spouses: Bjoern Timmermann (m. 1977–?); John A. Connor (m. 1983–present)

Bonnie Timmermann (born Bonnie J. Golub, December 1947) is an American casting director and producer for film, television and theatre, perhaps best known for her work on the TV series Miami Vice and for her ongoing collaboration with the show's creator, Michael Mann.

== Early life and career ==
Timmermann was born Bonnie J. Golub in Manhattan, New York City, one of three children born to Joseph Golub and Bertha Teruer. Raised near Rockaway Beach, Queens, Golub left home at age 16 and—much to her subsequent regret—never did finish high school.

In the 1970s, she worked at the William Morris Agency and Helen Harvey Associates before opening her own agency, Bonnie Golub Associates, in 1974. It was roughly 3 years later that Golub acquired, via marriage, the surname by which she has since come to be universally known. The marriage itself, however, proved short-lived, and in 1983 Timmermann met—and promptly married—her current husband and occasional collaborator, John A. Connor, one of whose two writing credits is on a Timmermann-cast TV episode of Miami Vice. (Note: In addition to the 1989 Miami Vice episode, "Too Much, Too Late," on which Connor is credited, there have since been at least two Timmermann-produced, Connor-scripted projects reported as being in pre-production, neither of which ever came to fruition.)

On March 17, 1992, Timmermann made her Broadway producing debut with Ariel Dorfman's Death and the Maiden; she later served as co-producer on Roman Polanski's screen adaptation.

On September 8, 2022, Bonnie, Simon Wallon's documentary on Timmermann's life and career, received its world premiere at the Venice Biennale.

== Partial filmography ==
- Uncommon Women and Others, 1978
- The House of Mirth, 1981
- Fast Times at Ridgemont High, 1982
- Trading Places, 1983
- Easy Money, 1983
- The Keep, 1983 (Casting [USA])
- C.H.U.D., 1984
- Amadeus, 1984 (Casting [Additional])
- Miami Vice (89 episodes), 1985–1989
- Band of the Hand, 1986
- Crime Story (pilot), 1986
- Manhunter, 1986
- Tough Guys Don't Dance, 1987 (New York casting)
- Gardens of Stone, 1987 (East Coast casting)
- Dirty Dancing, 1987
- Beverly Hills Cop II, 1987
- Light of Day, 1987
- Ironweed, 1987
- Frantic, 1988 (Casting [USA])
- Midnight Run, 1988
- Miles from Home, 1988
- Stealing Home, 1988
- Tequila Sunrise, 1988
- Bull Durham, 1988
- The Salute of the Jugger, 1989 (Casting [USA])
- Revenge, 1989
- Johnny Handsome
- Awakenings, 1990
- State of Grace, 1990
- Mobsters, 1991
- The Hard Way, 1991
- Dragon: The Bruce Lee Story, 1992 (The Filmmakers would like to thank)
- Medicine Man, 1992
- Bitter Moon, 1992 (Casting [USA])
- The Last of the Mohicans
- Glengarry Glen Ross, 1992
- Dave, 1993
- Carlito's Way, 1993
- Point of No Return, 1993
- The Music of Chance, 1993
- I Love Trouble, 1994
- Quiz Show, 1994
- Romeo is Bleeding, 1994
- Heat, 1995
- Death and the Maiden, 1995 (co-producer)
- Eraser, 1996
- City of Industry, 1996 (Consultant)
- Father's Day, 1997
- A Further Gesture, 1997 (Co-producer, casting [US])
- In the Gloaming, 1997 (Co-producer, casting)
- Six Days Seven Nights, 1998
- Armageddon, 1998
- The Insider, 1999
- Coyote Ugly, 2000
- Blue Moon, 2000
- Once in the Life , 2000
- Chinese Coffee, 2001
- Spy Game, 2001
- Pearl Harbor, 2001
- An American Rhapsody, 2001 (Producer)
- Black Hawk Down, 2002
- The Guys (Executive Producer)
- Wonderful Days (Special Thanks to)
- Shade
- Man on Fire, 2004
- Cuba Libre, 2004
- Slow Burn, 2005
- Bug, 2006
- Fur: An Imaginary Portrait of Diane Arbus, 2006
- Deception, 2008
- The Broken, 2009 (Casting Director [US])
- Public Enemies, 2009
- The Conspirator, 2010 (Casting Consultant)
- Small Apartments, 2013
- I Origins, 2014 (Executive Producer)
- Blackhat, 2015
- Ballerina, 2016
- Holy Lands, 2017
- Remember Me, 2019 (Casting Director)
- I Know This Much Is True (Season 1), 2019–2020 (Casting)

== Personal life ==
Timmermann's brother Michael Golub is a sound recordist and mixer in television and film.
