= Sarasvati Productions =

Canadian theater company

- Formation: 1998
- Dissolved: 2023
- Type: Theatre group
- Purpose: Feminist theatre
- Location: Winnipeg, Manitoba
- Artistic directors: Hope McIntyre (1998-2020); Frances Koncan (2020-2021)
- Website: sarasvati.ca

Sarasvàti Productions, often stylized Sarasvati Productions, was a Canadian feminist theatre company. Sarasvati hosted several annual events including the International Women's Week Cabaret of Monologues, One Night Stand, and FemFest.

== History ==
Sarasvati Productions was founded in 1998 in Toronto and permanently relocated to Winnipeg in 2000. The company was founded by Hope McIntyre who named it after the Hindu goddess, Saraswati.

In 2003, Sarasvati launched their International Women's Week Cabaret of Monologues. The cabaret features monologues from local artists pertaining to the annual theme. In 2008, the Cabaret of Monologues expanded to include touring across Manitoba. In 2017, Sarasvati relaunched their One Night Stand series. One Night Stand features ten-minute snippets from plays written by local playwrights.

In 2020, McIntyre stepped down as artistic director and Frances Koncan was appointed the incoming artistic director. Koncan resigned in March 2021. In 2023, the Board of Directors announced the closure of the company.

== FemFest ==
FemFest was founded in 2003. The Winnipeg Free Press described FemFest as "Canada’s main festival for female playwrights". FemFest is a two-week festival that features plays and readings from female playwrights from Manitoba and around the world.

The festival also features the annual Bake Off competition, in partnership with the Manitoba Association of Playwrights. Bake Off launched in 2012 and features several local playwrights who create ten-minute scenes with a surprise set of three "ingredients". The playwrights are given eight hours to write their scenes. The winning playwright receives dramaturgical assistance to develop their scene into a full play which will then receive a staged reading at the next FemFest.

FemFest celebrated its 10th anniversary in 2012 from September 15 to 22. The theme of this iteration of the festival was "Staging Identity". This FemFest was decidedly national and featured artists from Vancouver, Toronto, and Montreal in addition to Winnipeg-based artists. As part of the 2017 FemFest, Sarasvati collaborated with the Winnipeg Public Library to create a Human Library, partially inspired by Denmark's Human Library. The "library" featured 24 human books.

== Select production history ==
Sarasvati generally produces only one main-stage show per year in addition to its programming with FemFest, the Cabaret of Monologues, and One Night Stand.

- Hunger by Hope McIntyre (1998)
- Revisioning by Hope McIntyre (1999)
- Missiah by Hope McIntyre (2000)
- Death of Love by Hope McIntyre (2001)
- Fire Visions: Poems by Bertolt Brecht (2002)
- One for the Road by Harold Pinter (2003)
- You Whore (2003) - collective creation, performed at the Winnipeg Fringe Festival
- Jill's War by Victoria Loa Hicks and Nancy Kruh (2004) - performed at the Winnipeg Fringe Festival
- Impromptu of Outremont by Michel Tremblay (2005)
- Ripple Effect by Hope McIntyre (2008) - touring production at various Manitoba high schools
- Bone Cage by Catherine Banks (2009) - reading, part of Carol Shields Festival of New Works
- Fen by Caryl Churchill (2010)
- Eden by Hope McIntyre (2012) - directed by Sharon Bajer
- Jail Baby by Hope McIntyre and Cairn Moore with Nan Fewchuk and Marsha Knight (2013) - directed by Ann Hodges
- Fefu and Her Friends by María Irene Fornés (2014) - directed by Hope McIntyre
- Giving Voice (2014) - created with VOICES: Manitoba's Youth in Care Network, touring production at Manitoba high schools
- Miss N Me by Catherine Banks (2015) - directed by Hope McIntyre
- Shattered (2016)
- Breaking Through (2017) - directed by Kevin Klassen
- New Beginnings (2018) - directed by Cherissa Richards

=== FemFest productions ===
2020: "Engaging Community"

- Alice and The World We Live In by Alexandria Haber
- Monstrous by Sarah Waisvisz (livestream only)

2019: "All the World’s a Stage"

- Like Mother Like Daughter - directed by Rose Plotek
- To Kill A Lizard by The Launchpad Project
- Raising Stanley / Life with Tulia by Kim Patrick - directed by Bronwyn Steinberg
- 4inXchange - organized by xLq
- Baby Box by Eva Barrie, Miranda Calderon, and Michelle Polak - directed by Hope McIntyre

2018: "Staging Resistance"

- Sound of the Beast by Donna-Michelle St. Bernard
- Burnt by Norah Paton
- White Man’s Indian by Darla Contois
- The Game by Manohar Performing Arts of Canada

2017: "Coming of Age"

- Tomboy Survival Guide by Ivan Coyote
- Two Indians by Falen Johnson

2016: "Transformation"

- Morro and Jasp Do Puberty by Heather Marie Annis and Amy Lee
- Miss Understood by Antonette Rea
- The Seduction Theory by Sherry MacDonald
- Mouthpiece by Norah Sadava and Amy Nostbakken

2015: "Hear Her Roar"

- The Dance-Off of Unconscious Coupling by Frances Koncan
- The National Elevator Project

2014: "She’s Got the Power"

- The Naked Woman by Rebecca Gibson
- Launched by Tyler White
- Skin Deep by Alison Mclean - reading
- German Silver by Priscilla Yakielashek - reading
- 8 Ways My Mother Was Conceived by Michaela Di Cesare
- Herewithal: A Paranormal Comedy by Jim and Tara Travis
- River Story by Rubena Sinha

2010: "On the Edge"

- she by d’bi young.anitafrica

2007: "We've Come a Long Way"

- The Dance of Sara Wiens by Joy Eidse
