= Bug (Canadian play) =

2018 play by Yolanda Bonnell

- Written by: Yolanda Bonnell
- Characters: Manidoons
- Subject: Indigenous peoples in Canada, racism, colonialism

Premiere
- Date: 2018
- Place: Luminato

Bug is a play by Indigenous playwright Yolanda Bonnell that was a Governor General's Award 2020 finalist. The play is the story of an Indigenous mother and daughter, their substance addictions, incorporating themes of racialised and colonial violence.

== Production ==
Bug was written by Yolanda Bonnell of Fort William First Nation in Thunder Bay Set design was by Jay Havens of the Mohawk nation. Bonnell plays the character Manidoons.

Upon the play's release, Yolanda Bonnell asked that only people of colour review the play, which premiered at the Luminato festival in 2018.

== Synopsis ==
Bug has two characters, a mother and daughter, both played by Bonnell, both struggling with addiction, both unsure of the reasons why. The two characters never interact.

The play includes themes of the Sixties Scoop, of queer and two-spirit leadership, it includes colonial violence, racial violence, and gender-based violence, along with intergenerational trauma.

== Critical reception ==
J. Kelly Nestruck equated the Bug's narrative to the Anishinaabe creation story. Karyn Recollet of the Globe and Mail, when asked to score the play, said "If I were to provide a rating then, it would be a full-on constellation."

The play was a finalist for the Governor General's Literary Awards.

== See also ==
- Women of the Fur Trade, 2020 play by Frances Koncan
