= Her Wicked Ways =

- Also known as: Lethal Charm
- Genre: Drama; Thriller
- Written by: Janice Hickey; Michael Pardridge
- Directed by: Richard Michaels
- Starring: Barbara Eden; Heather Locklear; Stuart Wilson; Julie Fulton; David James Elliott
- Music by: Fred Karlin
- Country of origin: United States
- Original language: English

Production
- Executive producer: Lois Luger
- Producers: Art Levinson; Gene Schwam
- Production location: Washington, D.C.
- Cinematography: William Steven Shaw
- Editor: Andrew Cohen
- Running time: 95 minutes
- Production companies: Lois Luger Productions; Freyda Rothstein Productions; Bar-Gene Productions; ITC Entertainment

Original release
- Network: CBS
- Release: January 1, 1991

Her Wicked Ways (also known as Lethal Charm) is a 1991 American made-for-television thriller-drama film starring Barbara Eden and Heather Locklear. Directed by Richard Michaels and produced by ITC Entertainment, it originally aired on CBS on January 1, 1991.

== Summary ==
Tess O'Brien is a TV reporter and White House Correspondent who lives a life of power and glamour. When Melody Shepherd is assigned to assist her, Tess takes Melody under her wing. Melody idolizes Tess and is more than eager to learn to help any way she can. Soon, Melody is living in Tess' house, having an affair with her son Andrew and winning the affection of her network bosses. Tess realizes that Melody's ambitions knows no bounds and that she will use any means to reach her goals. With her job, Andrew and the life of kidnapped journalist Henry Dodds in the balance, Tess must discover Melody's dark secrets and unravel her scheme for power.

== Cast ==
- Barbara Eden as Tess O'Brien
- Heather Locklear as Melody Shepherd
- Stuart Wilson as Peter Chambers
- Julie Fulton as Christine
- David James Elliott as Andrew O'Brien
- Jed Allan as Brad Duggan
- Maurice Benard as Steve
- Tom Klunis as Henry Dodds

== Production ==
The film was shot on location in Washington, D.C. in March 1990.

== Home media ==
The film was released on videocassette under the title Lethal Charm by LIVE Home Video on August 18, 1993.

== Ratings ==
The film was watched by 24.5 million US viewers.
