= Small Apartments =

- Theatrical release poster
- Directed by: Jonas Åkerlund
- Written by: Chris Millis
- Based on: Small Apartments by Chris Millis
- Produced by: Ash R. Shah; Timothy Wayne Peternel; David Hillary; Bonnie Timmermann
- Starring: Matt Lucas; James Caan; Johnny Knoxville; Billy Crystal; Dolph Lundgren; Peter Stormare; Juno Temple; Amanda Plummer; Rebel Wilson; Rosie Perez; James Marsden
- Cinematography: Pär M. Ekberg
- Edited by: Christian Larson
- Music by: Per Gessle
- Distributed by: Inferno Distribution (international sales); Sony Pictures
- Release dates: March 10, 2012 (SXSW); February 8, 2013 (United States)
- Running time: 97 minutes
- Country: United States
- Language: English

Small Apartments is a 2012 American independent black comedy drama film directed by Jonas Åkerlund. It tells the story of Franklin Franklin, played by Matt Lucas, who by mistake kills his landlord, Mr. Olivetti, played by Peter Stormare. The cast co-stars Dolph Lundgren, Johnny Knoxville, James Caan, Billy Crystal, Juno Temple, Rebel Wilson, Saffron Burrows and Amanda Plummer. The screenplay was written by Chris Millis and adapted from his own novella. The film premiered at the South by Southwest Film Festival on March 10, 2012.

== Plot ==
Franklin Franklin is a hairless, overweight, eccentric social misfit and compulsive hoarder obsessed with Switzerland. He walks around in only his underwear and mismatching socks, and lives on a diet consisting of Moxie soda and pickles with mustard. Franklin lives alone in an almost-bare apartment in a rundown Southern California building complex. The apartments are populated with other eccentrics, including cynical marijuana user Tommy Balls, neurotic geriatric recluse Mr. Allspice, and aspiring dancer Simone, who lives with her mother, both of whom are implied to be prostitutes.

Franklin's landlord Mr. Olivetti accidentally died after slipping on spilled mustard caused by sneezing fits while receiving fellatio from Franklin to compensate for his frequently unpaid rent. In an effort to get rid of Olivetti's body, Franklin takes it to Olivetti's house and tries to stage it as a suicide, implementing an unlikely combination of suicide methods. Attempting to dump Olivetti's pickup truck in the outskirts of town results in Franklin being robbed (of both his brother's watch and Olivetti's truck) and assaulted by two very dimwitted muggers.

The next day, Franklin wonders why he has not gotten his weekly audiotape from his institutionalized brother Bernard, who Franklin views as handsome, charismatic and popular. Unknown to Franklin, Bernard has died of an inoperable brain tumor and among his effects is an envelope holding a key to a locker. In it, there is a recorded message revealing that Bernard stole from his employer and has left Franklin savings in a Swiss bank account, as well as a passport with a new identity.

Meanwhile, fire investigator Burt Walnut and other detectives examine Olivetti's body, quickly concluding that it has been staged. Walnut puts out an APB for Olivetti's pickup truck, and becomes suspicious of Franklin after visiting the apartment complex and meeting his neighbors Balls and Allspice. Walnut is estranged from his wife (who was having an affair with his cousin), and learns that Allspice's wife died 13 years ago, around the same time as Olivetti's wife.

Working at his convenience store, Balls shatters Simone's dancing dreams with his brutal honesty; upset, she hides in the restroom. He is then held up by Franklin's muggers, who shoot him in the torso when startled by Simone. Franklin returns to his apartment, but upon seeing the police he keeps on driving. Walnut discovers that Allspice has committed suicide, and when answering a phone call by Franklin, he is asked to adopt Franklin's dog (also named Bernard). Walnut informs him of the muggers' arrest, calling them Olivetti's murderers and remarking of Olivetti that "some might say that he had it coming to him."

Although innocent, Franklin takes his Switzerland flight, sitting next to Dr. Sage Mennox, a self-help author who Bernard obsessed over. He tells him that his brother died and was not insane as Mennox had previously asserted, but had actually been impaired by a fatal brain tumor "the size of a racquet ball". Mennox is taken off guard by this, and Franklin (who has held a grudge against him for previously belittling his hero Bernard), slyly remarks that they would be stuck together, in this awkward situation, for the duration of a very long flight. Finally, Franklin is seen in Switzerland standing in front of the Matterhorn mountain surrounded by three attractive Swiss women in Swiss folk costume.

== Cast ==
- Matt Lucas as Franklin Franklin
- James Caan as Mr. Allspice, Franklin's neighbour in 204
- Juno Temple as Simone, who lives across the way from Franklin
- Saffron Burrows as Francine
- Peter Stormare as Mr. Olivetti, the landlord
- Johnny Knoxville as Tommy Balls, the neighbour on the other side, who works at Tag's Liquor
- Rebel Wilson as Rocky, Tommy Balls' girlfriend
- James Marsden as Bernard Franklin, Franklin's brother who lives in a mental hospital
- DJ Qualls as Artie, night clerk at Tag's Liquor
- Dolph Lundgren as Dr. Sage Mennox
- Billy Crystal as Burt Walnut, the fire investigator looking into Mr. Olivetti's death
- Noel Gugliemi as Dog walker, driving instructor Samaritan
- David Koechner as Detective Tim O'Grady
- Rosie Perez as Ms. Baker, nurse at the hospital
- Amanda Plummer as Mrs. Ballisteri, Tommy Balls' Mother
- Ned Bellamy as Daniel, the EMT
- Angela Lindvall as Lisa, the flight attendant
- David Warshofsky as Detective Rich Holman
- Alex Solowitz as Sebastian

== Production ==
The film was produced through Deep Sky, Silver Nitrate, Amuse Entertainment and Bonnie Timmermann. It was co-financed by Sense And Sensibility Ventures and Silver Nitrate. According to director Jonas Åkerlund, it was important for him that the production had a strong element of spontaneity; he therefore did not focus solely on the film like he had with his previous features, but also made 34 commercials and five music videos the same year. Small Apartments was made largely with the same crew Åkerlund uses in his other projects. The first actor to be cast was Matt Lucas in the lead.

=== Filming ===
Photography took 20 days and ended in April 2011.

== Music ==
The soundtrack, by Per Gessle of Roxette, was released on 17 April 2013.

== Release ==
=== Theatrical ===
The film premiered at the South by Southwest Film Festival on 10 March 2012.

=== Home media ===
It was released on home media on 19 February 2013.

== Reception ==
=== Critical response ===
On the review aggregator website Rotten Tomatoes, 30% of 10 critics' reviews are positive, with an average rating of 4.4/10.

John DeFore of The Hollywood Reporter wrote that "Small Apartments might crumble if not cemented by a compellingly weird performance by Little Britain's Matt Lucas", and that "even the scene-chewingest performance here (Peter Stormare as the sleazoid landlord, seen in flashback) augments the whole instead of drawing attention from it". DeFore also complimented Billy Crystal, writing that his performance "roots the picture to its ostensible genre while reminding us how engaging the actor can be when he's appearing not to try."
