= Zahgidiwin/love =

2016 play by Frances Koncan

- Written by: Frances Koncan
- Subject: Canadian Indian residential school system
- Genre: Dark comedy

Premiere
- Date: 2016
- Directed by: Frances Koncan

Zahgidiwin/love is a 2016 decolonial comedy play by Frances Koncan about the residential school system in Canada. It won the Harry Rintoul Award in 2016.

== Production ==
Zahgidiwin/love is written and directed by Anishnaabe playwright Frances Koncan.

The play is one hour long.

The original cast starred Kelsey Kanatan Wavey, Erin Meagan Schwartz and Beverley Katherine.

== Synopsis ==
Zahgidiwin/love is a dark comedy that uses satire to explore the religious and colonial history of Canada and its residential school system.

== Critical reception ==
Zahgidiwin/love won the Harry Rintoul Award for the Best New Play in 2016, at the Winnipeg Fringe Theatre Festival.
Shawna Dempsey, reviewing for the CBC, wrote "Holy feminist fireworks! Blazing birth of post-colonial nebula!" and described the play as "like a really good acid trip".
