= The Dave Thomas Comedy Show =

- Genre: Comedy
- Created by: Dave Thomas
- Written by: Dave Thomas; Mike Short; Mike Myers; Ed Solomon; Max Pross; Tom Gammill; Michael Bayouth; Anson Downes
- Directed by: Dave Thomas; Paul Miller
- Starring: Dave Thomas; Anson Downes; Julie Fulton; Teresa Ganzel; Don Lake; Dan Aykroyd; Valri Bromfield; John Candy; Chevy Chase; Kelly Preston; John Roarke; Martin Short; Catherine O'Hara; Rick Overton
- Theme music composer: Ian Thomas
- Country of origin: United States
- Original language: English
- No. of seasons: 1
- No. of episodes: 5

Production
- Executive producers: Dave Thomas; Bernie Brillstein
- Producer: Kimber Rickabaugh
- Running time: 30 minutes

Original release
- Network: CBS
- Release: May 28 – June 25, 1990

The Dave Thomas Comedy Show (later simply Dave Thomas) was a sketch-based, half-hour, five-week summer replacement series, which aired on CBS in the summer of 1990. The show starred Canadian comedian Dave Thomas, who is best known for an earlier sketch comedy series, SCTV. Thomas himself served as head writer, while the writing staff included Hollywood scriptwriter Ed Solomon and Mike Myers. The series debuted May 28, 1990.

== Cast and guest stars ==
Anson Downes, Teresa Ganzel, Don Lake, Julie Fulton and David Wiley made up the supporting cast of various characters in the sketches, while veteran character actress Fran Ryan had a recurring role as a wise-cracking waitress also named Fran Ryan. In addition, the series usually featured big-name guest stars (John Candy, Dan Aykroyd, Chevy Chase, Martin Short and Catherine O'Hara) Thomas knew from The Second City and other previous projects—although the musical guest for the series finale was actually a fictionalized version of Johnny Cash played by Dave himself. John Roarke, Valri Bromfield, and Rick Overton were also occasionally featured in supporting roles.

== Format ==
Dave introduced every episode with a monologue that typically segued into the first sketch. Despite the often larger celebrity status of his guest stars, Thomas himself usually played the lead in the sketches, with his celebrity guests in co-starring roles. In addition to sketches, the show featured semi-scripted interview segments on the set of "Fran's Diner," where Dave and his guests would chat over coffee or a meal. Fran's Diner was also the setting for a running gag which appeared in every episode, in which Dave, as a customer, would chat with Fran and experience vivid daydreams which invariably spoofed stereotypical male sexual fantasies filled with beautiful women—only to be disappointed that the reality was Fran and her diner. In these segments, the punchline would typically involve Fran somehow knowing the content of Dave's daydream, or breaking the fourth wall with references to the fact that they were on a television series.

== Notable sketches ==
Critics from such publications as Entertainment Weekly and TV Guide applauded a trio of sketches in which Thomas impersonated notable personalities in absurdist situations -- Edward Woodward as his Equalizer character reimagined as "the Humiliator" (who uses insults rather than guns to incapacitate criminals), Jack Palance miscast as a creepy sitcom star (who still uses his catch-phrase from Ripley's Believe it or Not!), and Max von Sydow as a depressed barber who inadvertently terrorizes his customers by chatting casually about his obsession with death.

== List of episodes ==
No.	Title	Original release date
1	"Episode 1"	May 28, 1990
John Candy guest stars in the first episode of the show.
2	"Episode 2"	June 4, 1990
Dan Aykroyd guest stars in the second episode of the show.
3	"Episode 3"	June 11, 1990
Originally aired on January 25, 1990 as a pilot, guest starring Chevy Chase and Martin Short.
4	"Episode 4"	June 18, 1990
Catherine O'Hara guest stars in the fourth episode of the show.
5	"Episode 5"	June 25, 1990
Johnny J. Folsom - a fictional character portrayed by Dave Thomas - guest stars in the fifth and final episode of the show.

== Production ==
As Thomas explained in an interview with Kenneth Plume on IGN.com, Thomas had originally conceived of the show as more experimental, especially in terms of interaction with the studio audience, but CBS executives told him to tone down the experimental aspects of the series—a decision which, Thomas believes, ultimately contributed to the show's short life span.
