= The D Cut =

2020 Canadian television series

- Written by: Audrey Dwyer; Wendy Litner
- Directed by: D. W. Waterson
- Starring: Marie Marolle; Marlee Walchuk; Libby Osler; Vlad Alexis; Amrit Kaur
- Country of origin: Canada
- No. of seasons: 1
- No. of episodes: 6

Production
- Producers: Dove Hair and Unilever Entertainment partnering with Shaftesbury Films

Original release
- Network: Crave
- Release: June 26, 2020

The D Cut is a 2020 Canadian television series on Crave co-written by Audrey Dwyer and Wendy Litner and directed by D. W. Waterson. The show stars Marie Marolle as D, a young hairstylist running a queer hair salon.

== Plot ==
The D Cut follows self-taught hairstylist D, who runs a hair salon in the back of Mum's bike shop. D must rally a young queer community to help save their hair salon. D's new client, Viva, is introduced as a possible love interest for D.

== Cast and characters ==
- Marie Marolle as D
- Marlee Walchuk as Mum
- Libby Osler as Quinn
- Vlad Alexis as Liam
- Amrit Kaur as Viva

== Episodes ==
No.	Title	Directed by	Written by	Original release date	Viewers (millions)
1	"The "You" Cut"	D. W. Waterson	Audrey Dwyer and Wendy Litner	June 26, 2020	N/A
2	"Microbangs"	D. W. Waterson	Audrey Dwyer and Wendy Litner	June 26, 2020	N/A
3	"Dye Job"	D. W. Waterson	Audrey Dwyer and Wendy Litner	June 26, 2020	N/A
4	"Undercut"	D. W. Waterson	Audrey Dwyer and Wendy Litner	June 26, 2020	N/A
5	"Blow Out"	D. W. Waterson	Audrey Dwyer and Wendy Litner	June 26, 2020	N/A
6	"No-Cut Cut"	D. W. Waterson	Audrey Dwyer and Wendy Litner	June 26, 2020	N/A

== Background and production ==
The D Cut was produced by Dove Hair and Unilever Entertainment in partnership with Shaftesbury Films. The first season was shot in Toronto over the span of four days. The D Cut premiered on Crave on June 26, 2020, to coincide with Pride Month. It had a second premiere shortly after on KindaTV, Shaftesbury Films's LGBTQ2S+-centred YouTube channel. The show was directed by D.W. Waterson.

=== Development and writing ===
The D Cut was co-written by Audrey Dwyer and Wendy Litner and was inspired by the true story of a hairstylist from Montreal who ran a hair salon in the back of a bike shop. The real hair salon worked on a pay-what-you-can basis. Dwyer and Litner were paired together by Shaftesbury Films to work on the series.

== Awards and nominations ==
Year	Award	Category	Result	Notes	Ref.
2021	OVATION Awards of Excellence and Awards of Merit (IABC)	Diversity & Inclusion – LGBTQ2	Won		
2021	OVATION Awards of Excellence and Awards of Merit (IABC)	Marketing, Advertising & Brand Communication	Won		
2021	Canadian Alliance of Film & Television Costume Arts & Design (CAFTCAD) Awards	Costume Design in Web Series	Nominated	For wardrobe designer Casey Jane Tuninga, wardrobe assistant, Evely Escobar, and wardrobe swing, Kendra Bowes	
