= Fefu and Her Friends =

Play by María Irene Fornés (1977)

- Written by: María Irene Fornés

Premiere
- Date: May 5, 1977
- Place: Relativity Media Lab, New York City, New York, United States

Fefu and Her Friends was the fourteenth play by Cuban American playwright María Irene Fornés, originally written and produced in 1977. It is known for its alternative staging and use of a solely female cast.

== Synopsis ==
=== Plot ===
Fefu and her Friends is set in New England in the spring of 1935. The story takes the audience through an amazing entire day beginning around noon and ending in the evening; it climaxes in a death scene.

The play is split into three parts. It begins in the living room of Fefu's country house. Part 2 is set in four different areas of the house: the lawn, the study, the bedroom, and the kitchen. Fornés deconstructs the familiar stage, removing the fourth wall, and scenes are played in multiple locations simultaneously throughout the theater. The audience is divided into groups to watch each scene, then they rotate to the next set, as the scene is repeated until each group has seen all four scenes.

Fefu and her seven female friends gather at Fefu's house to rehearse a presentation for their charity toward school education. Each character plays a role in this event. Before and after their rehearsal, the women interact with one another, and share their thoughts and feelings about life along with their personal struggles and societal concerns. Fornés portrays these characters as real women, in a shift in her playwriting style to realism in setting, character, and situations.

=== Action ===
The majority of the triggers begin with Fefu in her desire to express control over her friends. Her use of the gun and her overall organization of the rehearsal for the play places the other characters in positions of submission. Fefu has two sides according to Kelda Lynn Jordan—the controlling trait and the motherly trait. Fefu also criticizes herself and women in the play as being lesser than men, which also shows her preference for male traits. Jordan also comments on the meek stereotypical weakness of the other characters such as Paula, Sue, Christina, and Cindy. The only woman who stands against Fefu is Julia and this makes Fefu more aggressive toward her, leading her to kill the rabbit that symbolizes her loss of power and control. The actions of the play demonstrate the daily power struggles of women in a society that is dominated by men. According to Robert Wilson, Fefu and Her Friends "challenges our preconceptions of life" and Julia's final wound in the end is "our own".

== Characters ==
Fefu (originally played by Rebecca Schull) – the main character who has many male characteristics. She struggles against her femininity with her relationship with her off-stage husband, Phillip. Fornés depicts her as always seeking control. Fefu adds humor with her game where she shoots at her husband and toys around the danger of not knowing if the gun is loaded. Her biggest scene is during Part 3 in her confession with Julia. Fefu states, " I need him Julia. I need his touch. I need his kiss. I need the person he is...I am frightened and I am overbearing." The weakness and truth of her character comes out to the audience. In the end, she shoots and kills a rabbit. At the same time, the shot affects her friend Julia, who mysteriously dies from a head wound.

Cindy (originally played by Gwendolyn Brown) – one of the first characters introduced in the country house. She was present when Julia was paralyzed the day a hunter almost shot her a year prior. The majority of her actions are with her friend, Christina including their conversation together in the study of Part 2. In this act, Cindy describes a dream she had of taking control while a young doctor attempted to fondle her.

Christina (originally played by Carolyn Hearn) – also one of the first characters introduced in Part 1. Her character appears disturbed and confused by the actions of Fefu and must suck on an ice cube with Bourbon to relax. She practices her French with Cindy in Part 2.

Julia (originally played by Margaret Harrington) – her character is set in a wheelchair for the whole play. She became unconscious when a hunter shot a deer that was in the same area she was. She had convulsions and suffered a concussion with a bleeding wound on her forehead. Cindy believes there is no reason for Julia's paralysis since she was never hit by the bullet. Julia does have scarring in her brain called petit mal that causes her to blank out. Julia has her own scene in Part 2 of the bedroom where she has mild hallucinations. Her actions display a submissiveness to men. Julia states, "If a man commits an evil act, he must be pitied. The evil comes from outside him, through him and into the act. Woman generates the evil herself." Her head also moves as if she has been slapped, which shows Fornés' use of an invisible male character. Julia does not give in to Fefu's control during their confrontation in Part 3, but she dies in the end from an unknown wound. It is revealed that Julia can walk when she chooses to.

Emma (originally played by Gordana Rashovich) – a lively character who plays a role in directing the charity skit. She adds humor to the play as well with her antics. In Part 2, she has a conversation with Fefu about genitals and why people act as if genitals are not there. Her character also recites poems in the play.

Paula (originally played by Connie LoCurto Cicone) – is introduced in the play by Emma. She is another friend of Fefu's. Her main lines occur during part 2 in the kitchen. She has a conversation with Sue on love affairs and how long they last. Sue exits with a tray of Bourbon ice cubes and Cecilia Johnson enters. At first the conversation is awkward and then it is revealed that the two have an old romantic relationship together. The act ends as Cecilia reaches for Paula's hand.

Sue (originally played by Janet Biehl) – another friend of Emma and the other women. She has minor conversations with Julia and Paula and appears as the helpful friend. She tries to give Julia her soup in Part 2 and gives Paula advice in Part 2.

Cecilia (originally played by Joan Voukides) – appears at the end of Part 1 as Cecilia Johnson and asks Cindy if she is at the right place for the skit. She had a romantic relationship with Paula and has intimate moments with her throughout the play. She exits the play after the rehearsal is finished.

== Analysis ==
Fefu and Her Friends is recognized as a feminist play for its all-female cast, central ideas of gender roles, and its bold deviations from conventional stage presentation and audience involvement. Fornés divides the stage into a kitchen, bedroom, study, and lawn, and a short scene in each area is acted out with a fourth of the audience closely viewing each part. The groups of spectators rotate until they have seen all four scenes. These individual scenes highlight conflict in all of the women's lives and thus illustrate a more communal feminist struggle than "the typical feminist approach of the early days of the second wave of the movement which emphasized the existence and the rights of the individual woman."

Fornés uses the play as representation of the struggle of women against the female stereotype. Any interactions with male characters are done offstage and no established male characters are seen to portray how women behave when not in the presence of men.

Jules Aaron wrote of the play, "Fefu and Her Friends challenges our preconceptions about life and the theatre through boldly drawn women, temporarily divorced from relationships, trying to sort out the ambiguities of their lives."

=== Themes and motifs ===
Kelda Jordan states that Fefu and Her Friends illustrates how most women who struggle to escape the confine of a woman's stereotypical role in society tend to believe that the only way to do so is to control her surroundings and those close to her. Women who step too far outside of the boundaries that society has set for them are considered to be overly aggressive, and take on traits that are generally considered to be those of a man, and the women who possess these traits find that they are perceived as having these traits in excess, simply because the traits are exhibited at all.

According to David Krasner, the themes of loneliness, isolation and entrapment are strongly present in the play. He says that all women have been constrained in life choices to some extent. Fefu is imprisoned in her unhappy marriage, and because she is a woman, she does not possess the power to escape it, and is beginning to slide deeper into depression. Paula was left some time ago by Cecilia, her lover, and Cindy broke up with a man. Julia received emotional trauma when a deer was shot, suffered convulsions, and is now paralyzed. Julia symbolizes how the other women are trapped in their own way.

== Production history ==
The New York Times has described Fefu and Her Friends as a play "more often read and studied than seen".

Fefu and Her Friends premiered on May 5, 1977, as produced by the New York Theatre Strategy in New York City at the Relativity Media Lab. The production was directed by Fornés with set design by Linda Conaway, lighting by Candice Dunn and costumes by Lana Fritz. The premiere starred Rebecca Schull as Fefu and featured Gwendolyn Brown, Carolyn Hearn, Margaret Harrington, Gordana Rashovich, Connie LoCurto Cicone, Janet Biehl, and Joan Voukides. In 1978, this production was remounted by The American Place Theatre, also in New York City. In July 1978, Fefu and Her Friends' was produced at the Padua Hills Playwright's Festival in Claremont, CA. The production moved three months later to a very successful run at a theater in Pasadena. This production was the West Coast Premiere and Maria Irene Fornes directed. It received the 1978 L. A> Drama Critic Award for Best Ensemble. Lorinne Vozoff played Fefu, Sharon Ulrich played Julia, Kathleen Cramer played Cecelia Johnson, Laura Fanning played Paula Cori, Nina Glaudini played Cindy, Susan Krebs was also in the cast.

In 2014, Fefu and Her Friends was staged by Sarasvati Productions in Winnipeg, Manitoba. The production was directed by Hope McIntyre. The 2019 production, directed by Lileana Blain-Cruz and starring Amelia Workman as Fefu, opened on November 24 and was produced by Theater for a New Audience at the Polonsky Shakespeare Center. Season of Concern, an emergency fund for Chicago theatre artists with health-related issues, staged an online production of Fefu in partnership with Mary Beth Fisher in December 2020.. In 2026, "Fefu and Her Friends" was staged by the Barnard Theatre Department in New York, New York. The production was directed by Alice Reagan and starred Mimi Wu as Fefu. It opened on March 5th, 2026 at the Minor Latham Playhouse.

=== Translations ===
María Irene Fornés translated Fefu and Her Friends herself into Spanish. Almuth Fricke has translated the work into German.
