= Julie Fulton =

American actress of stage and screen

- Occupation: Actor

Julie Fulton is an American actress of stage and screen.

== Career ==
Fulton portrayed astronaut Judith Resnik in the movie about the shuttle disaster Challenger. She also played a secretary on Robert Wagner's Lime Street and played several characters in the summer variety The Dave Thomas Comedy Show consisting of comedy sketches and shown on Second City Television (SCT) debuting May 28, 1990. She had recurring roles on ER and Cagney and Lacey and starring roles in Burned Out, Simon and Simon, Hunter, Unholy Matrimony, and My Brother’s Keeper, among others.

Theatre credits include originating roles for stage at Yale Repertory theatre, South Coast Repertory theatre, Los Angeles and New York. Her one-woman show premiered as a guest artist at the University of California San Diego. She also guested at the British American Dramatic Academy in Oxford, England.

=== Other notable roles ===
TV

- 1997: Buffy the Vampire Slayer playing an FBI Teacher in the episode "Out of Mind, Out of Sight"
- 1995: ER playing Swanson in the episodes "Sleepless in Chicago" and "The Birthday Party"
- 1994: Melrose Place playing Michelle Bellows in the episode "The Days of Wine and Vodka"
- 1991: Her Wicked Ways (TV movie) playing Christine.
- 1990: Challenger playing Dr. Judith Resnik.
- 1989: Matlock playing Officer Donna Dawson in the episode "The Captain"
- 1987: Highway to Heaven playing Sharon Ryder in the episode "Normal People"
- 1986: Perfect playing Martha Young
- 1985: Family Ties as 'Suzie Harris' in the episodes 58 & 66 "Oh Donna" & "Cold Storage"
- 1985: regular Celia Wesphal on Lime Street
