= Secret Weapon (film) =

- Written by: Nick Evans
- Directed by: Ian Sharpe
- Starring: Griffin Dunne; Karen Allen; Jeroen Krabbe; Stuart Wilson; John Rhys-Davies; Brian Cox
- Music by: Alan Lisk
- Countries of origin: Australia; United States
- Original language: English

Production
- Producer: Nick Evans
- Production company: Griffin Productions

Original release
- Release: 1990

Secret Weapon is a 1990 American-Australian film.

It is the true story of Mordechai Vanunu, the Israeli nuclear technician who revealed to the world his country's nuclear weapons capabilities.

== Cast ==
- Griffin Dunne as Mordechai Vanunu
- Karen Allen as Ruth
- Jeroen Krabbe as Asher
- Stuart Wilson as Peter Hounam
- John Rhys-Davies as Mossad Chief
- Brian Cox as Andrew Neil
- Joe Petruzzi as Felix Romero
- Iain Mitchell as Robin Morgan
- Patrick Bailey as Leo Perkins
- Ronnie Stevens as Professor Barber
