= Death and the Maiden (film) =

1994 film by Roman Polanski

- Theatrical release poster
- Directed by: Roman Polanski
- Screenplay by: Ariel Dorfman; Rafael Yglesias
- Based on: Death and the Maiden by Ariel Dorfman
- Produced by: Josh Kramer; Thom Mount
- Starring: Sigourney Weaver; Ben Kingsley; Stuart Wilson
- Cinematography: Tonino Delli Colli
- Edited by: Hervé de Luze
- Music by: Wojciech Kilar
- Production companies: Capitol Films; Channel Four Films
- Distributed by: Fine Line Features (United States); Alliance Films (United Kingdom; through Momentum Pictures); Pyramide Distribution (France)
- Release date: December 23, 1994
- Running time: 103 minutes
- Countries: United States; United Kingdom; France
- Language: English
- Budget: $12 million
- Box office: $8 million

Death and the Maiden is a 1994 mystery drama film directed by Roman Polanski and starring Sigourney Weaver, Ben Kingsley and Stuart Wilson. It was based on the 1990 play of the same name by Ariel Dorfman, who also co-wrote the screenplay with Rafael Yglesias.

== Plot ==
Paulina Escobar is a housewife married to a prominent lawyer, Gerardo, in an unnamed South American country, which is implied to be Chile. One day, a storm forces Gerardo to ride home with a charming stranger, Dr. Miranda, while the power at his home is cut. Paulina is convinced that Miranda was part of the old regime and that he tortured and raped her for weeks while she was blindfolded. She takes him captive to determine the truth. Despite attempts by both her husband and Miranda to convince her that he is innocent, Paulina is certain that he is guilty and forces her husband to act as Miranda's "attorney" in the "trial" she arranges for him.

Miranda conspires with Gerardo to agree to a false confession, as Paulina states that this is all she wants in exchange for Miranda's life. They write up a false confession and present it to Paulina, but she becomes enraged and deems Miranda unrepentant, threatening to kill him. As Gerardo tries to stop her, Miranda gets hold of Paulina's gun and threatens to kill her if he is not freed. However, as he advances toward the door, the power in the house turns on, and Paulina hits him, regaining control.

In a last-ditch effort to save his life, Miranda implores Gerardo to call the Spanish medical school where he claims to have been at the time of Paulina's rape. She leads him blindfolded out of the door to the edge of the cliff. Gerardo contacts the school, where Miranda's colleague seems to confirm the story. He races to inform Paulina, now convinced that Miranda is innocent. However, Paulina refuses to believe it, stating that doctors at that time created alibis to conceal their identities. Miranda finally tells them that he really was the doctor, that he enjoyed brutalizing Paulina, and that he was sorry that the old regime fell.

Enraged, Gerardo attempts to throw Miranda from the cliff, only to realize he cannot bring himself to take a life. Paulina apparently accepts the confession, and they both leave Miranda on the cliff as he stares down at the water. The camera simulates someone falling off the cliff from his own point of view. In the final scene, Paulina and Gerardo are at the same concert where the film began with Miranda also present, looking down with his wife and sons. Paulina and Miranda cast uncomfortable glances at each other, and Miranda looks away. Miranda glances down at the couple again as the camera shows Gerardo glancing up towards the balcony at the now off-screen Miranda.

== Cast ==
- Sigourney Weaver as Paulina Escobar
- Ben Kingsley as Dr. Roberto Miranda
- Stuart Wilson as Gerardo Escobar
- Jorge Cruz as String Quartet Player
- Jonathan Vega as Dr. Miranda's Son
- Carlos Moreno as String Quartet Player #2
- Sergio Ortega Alvarado as String Quartet Manager
- Gilberto Cortés as String Quartet Player #3
- Rodolphe Vega as Dr. Miranda's Son #2
- Eduardo Valenzuela as String Quartet Player #4
- Krystia Mova as Dr. Miranda's Wife

== Production ==
Roman Polanski said he greatly enjoyed making the film. Producer Bonnie Timmermann, who had worked with Polanski on three other films, was pleased to say that he was ahead of schedule and praised Polanski's work calling it "his best movie since Tess."

== Music ==
A central motif is Schubert's string quartet in D minor, which is known as the "Death and the Maiden" Quartet. A recording of this quartet was played during Paulina's rape.

== Reception ==
=== Critical reception ===
On the review aggregator website Rotten Tomatoes, 84% of 50 critics' reviews are positive. The website's consensus reads: "With its claustrophobic setting heightening the tension and seasoned stars doing excellent work, Death and the Maiden is prime Polanski." On Metacritic, it has a score of 72 out of 100 based on reviews from 19 critics, indicating "generally favorable" reviews.

Roger Ebert of the Chicago Sun-Times gave it three out of four stars, writing: "Death and the Maiden is all about acting. In other hands, even given the same director, this might have been a dreary slog."

=== Box office ===
The film grossed $3 million in the United States and Canada and an estimated $8 million worldwide.
