= Vinegar Tom =

1976 play by Caryl Churchill

- Original language: English
- Written by: Caryl Churchill

Premiere
- Date: 12 October 1976
- Place: Humberside Theatre, Hull, Britain

Vinegar Tom is a 1976 play by the British playwright Caryl Churchill. The play examines gender and power relationships through the lens of 17th-century witchcraft trials in England. The script employs features of the epic theater associated with German playwright Bertolt Brecht, particularly through use of song as well as the added anachronism of the actors, who performed music in modern dress, despite the play's 17th century setting. There were seven songs and twenty-one scenes. The play's title comes from the name of one character's pet cat, supposed to be her familiar spirit, likely inspired by the supposed imp of one Elizabeth Clarke, a woman tried and executed for witchcraft in Essex in 1645.

Churchill's play was inspired by the Equal Pay Act 1970 and explored the unequal treatment of women to men in England, both in 17th century England and contemporaneously to time in which it was written.

== Plot ==
The play focuses on Alice, who with her mother Joan is accused of witchcraft by their neighbours, married couple Jack and Margery, after the latters' numerous failures including failed economic expansion, unsuccessful marital relations and agricultural misfortunes. In a denial of God's ill-favour towards them, they begin to interpret the unfortunate developments as evidence of witchcraft. It is later implied that Vinegar Tom, Joan's cat, may have been behind it all. The narrative becomes a tale of the 17th century England using witchcraft as a means to shift the blame towards nonconforming woman such as the old, poor, single, cunning or skilled, to help temper social unrest. Aside from witchcraft, the narrative also included themes such as the Christian faith and the oppression of women.

For context, one should take note that the play was written at the height of the second feminist movement in the 20th Century. Churchill, a highly influential feminist writer, used this specific script to display how much control men have in society and how women have historically been treated as chattel, taught to be subservient to men. All of the songs are set in the present, rather than the time period of the play, and reflect, in one way or another, the gender and sexual discrimination present in society. Betty, one of the play's characters, is classed as mad or ill simply because she does not want to marry. The play also outlined society's rejection of people who do not conform to the mainstream, or who are "odd" or "different". It was shown how going against the norm, no matter the time period, is not accepted by traditionalists. In the play, this behavior was seen as inhuman and a trait of an individual conspiring with the devil.

== Background information ==
Vinegar Tom was written by British playwright Caryl Churchill in 1976. Churchill collaborated with the feminist theatre company 'Monstrous Regiment' during the writing process, while at the same time completing work on another play, Light Shining in Buckinghamshire, with a different company, Joint Stock. Churchill and members from 'Monstrous Regiment' had met at a pro-choice protest march in the 1970s and quickly discovered that they were mutually interested in putting on a production about the social hardship of women in 17th century England and how marginalised women of this period, would often be branded as 'witches'. Churchill and 'Monstrous Regiment' saw this moment in history as a useful vehicle, and parallel, for highlighting contemporary (late 20th century) attitudes towards women and so interspersed various scenes in the play with contemporary songs, to be sung in modern dress. The music for the songs was composed by Helen Glavin, a founder member of Monstrous Regiment, she also wrote the lyrics for "If you float," one of the songs in the play. The group worked closely for several months on the development of Vinegar Tom. On October 12, 1976, Vinegar Tom was presented for the first time at the Humberside Theatre, Hull, England. It was directed by Pam Brighton while the original cast included:

- Joan: Mary McCusker
- Susan: Sue Todd
- Alice: Gillian Hanna
- Goody: Helen Glavin
- Betty: Josefina Cupido
- Margery: Linda Broughton
- Ellen "cunning woman": Chris Bowler
- Jack: Ian Blower
- Man, Doctor, Bellringer, Packer: Roger Allam
- Kramer and Sprenger: Chris Bowler, Mary McCusker

The opening of the play shows a woman (Alice. The audience do not know her name yet), who is in her early 20s and a character named, simply, Man. Rather than individualising the character 'Man' by giving him a name, Churchill uses a shorthand, story-telling technique, as used by Brecht, in order to show a 'type' or 'archetype', to the audience. By 'distancing' the character in this way, the audience is more likely to think about the situation/issue (a man using a woman for sex/the issue of sin and punishment/witchcraft) rather than become over-absorbed in who the characters are.

Reviews of the initial production included a positive review in the Tribune and a more mixed review from the Financial Times. The Oxford Encyclopedia of British Literature (2006) describes Vinegar Tom as "a complex and historically expansive investigation of the policing of women's bodies and desires".

== See also ==
- Malleus Maleficarum
- Heinrich Kramer
- Jacob Sprenger
