= Calpurnia (play) =

2018 play

- Original language: English
- Written by: Audrey Dwyer
- Characters: Julie; Lawrence; Mark; James; Precy; Christine
- Genre: Comedy

Premiere
- Place: Buddies in Bad Times, Toronto

Calpurnia is a 2018 play by Canadian playwright Audrey Dwyer. It is named after Calpurnia, a character in Harper Lee's To Kill A Mockingbird.

== Synopsis ==
Calpurnia centres around Julie, a twenty-something Black woman living with her father, an Afro-Caribbean judge, in Toronto. She is a screenwriter attempting to write a film about Calpurnia, the Finches' maid in To Kill A Mockingbird. Julie's brother, Mark, is an up-and-coming lawyer struggling to live up to his father's expectations. Julie's research on racial prejudice spark debates between her and her brother as Mark feels Julie is "not Black enough". Julie asks the family's Filipina housekeeper, Precy, about her life to further her research while Precy cooks dinner for Lawrence and his friend James. Mark's white girlfriend, Christine, also attends the dinner and sparks discussions of white privilege and respectability politics.

== Productions ==
Calpurnia premiered in 2018 at Buddies in Bad Times in Toronto. The premiere was directed by Dwyer and co-produced by Nightwood Theatre and Sulong Theatre. The premiere starred Meghan Swaby as Julie, Carolyn Fe as Precy, Matthew Brown as Mark, Andrew Moodie as Lawrence, Don Allison as James, and Natasha Greenblatt as Christine. Anna Treusch designed the set which stadium-style seating on either side of the stage.

In March 2022, Calpurnia was performed at the Royal Manitoba Theatre Centre. The 2022 production was directed by Sarah Garton Stanley and starred Emerjade Simms as Julie. The play featured Kwaku Adu-Poku as Mark, Ellie Ellwand as Christine, Rochelle Kives as Precy, Arne MacPherson as James, and Ray Strachan as Lawrence.

== Analysis ==
Calpurnia examines what it means to be Black in Canada and focusses on how its characters shift their identities to suit their environments. The character of Lawrence embodies the traditional image of an immigrant parent trying to make the best life for their children while also trying to educate them about their culture. However, Laurence does not speak Patois to his children, indicating his attempt to make his children "more Canadian".

Julie and Mark engage in several conversations about the usefulness and worth of updating canonical texts as well as who has a right to tell what stories. To Kill A Mockingbird is Mark's favourite book and he does not feel as though it needs any retelling. He also feels that Julie, a rich woman living in Toronto with no Black friends, does not know any more about being African-American in Alabama in the 1930s than Harper Lee did. Julie, on the other hand, faults Atticus Finch for his "slut-shaming" and refusing to call out the prejudice of white jury members.

The character of Precy acts as a model for Lee's Calpurnia, in that she serves Lawrence and his children the same way Calpurnia serves the Finch family. Dwyer was interested in using Precy to examine how different racial minorities interact with each other as well as to examine the concept of allyship.

== Development ==
Dwyer began writing Calpurnia in 2012 after playing a maid in a show. She developed the play with Obsidian Theatre as part of their playwriting unit. During the time between the play's 2018 premiere and this staging, Dwyer made several changes to the script and the play underwent dramaturgy from Sarah Garton Stanley. Of the 2018 and 2022 productions, Dwyer said "this definitely is not the same play."
