= Romance on the Orient Express =

1985 television film by Lawrence Gordon Clark

- Film poster
- Written by: Jan Worthington
- Directed by: Lawrence Gordon Clark
- Starring: Cheryl Ladd; Stuart Wilson
- Composer: Allyn Ferguson
- Country of origin: United Kingdom
- Original language: English

Production
- Executive producer: Frank von Zerneck
- Producer: Michael Glynn
- Cinematography: Peter Jackson
- Editor: Stan Hawkes
- Running time: 96 minutes
- Production companies: Yorkshire Television; Frank von Zerneck Films

Original release
- Network: NBC (United States); ITV (United Kingdom)
- Release: 4 March 1985

Romance on the Orient Express is a 1985 British romantic drama television film directed by Lawrence Gordon Clark. It premiered on NBC in the United States on 4 March and aired on ITV in the United Kingdom on 17 November. The film stars Cheryl Ladd and Stuart Wilson, with John Gielgud, Renée Asherson, Ralph Michael, Ruby Wax, and Julian Sands in supporting roles.

== Plot ==
Nineteen-year-old college student Lily Parker boards a train in Europe with a friend. During the trip, she meets the 22-year-old Alex Woodward, an aristocratic Englishman who courts her. They travel together and fall deeply in love. Alex wants to marry her, but his friend Sandy assures him that his father would never approve. After arriving in Paris, instead of meeting Lily one evening, Alex is summoned away by his father and never returns.

Ten years later, Lily is employed as a magazine editor and embarks on a business trip in Europe with her outgoing best friend, Susan Lawson. Susan persuades her to travel from Venice to Paris by train, rather than by plane. They board the Orient Express, where Susan hopes to find romance, and where Lily is reminded of the time she spent with Alex. Lily unexpectedly runs into Alex on the train, who admits that he has been looking for her for years to explain himself. Bitter over the past, she refuses to talk to him.

Alex persuades Lily to have dinner with him, but past conflicts cause her to leave prematurely. She later returns, deciding to give him another chance. They reveal that they were both married for five years and then divorced, but only Lily's marriage produced a child, a daughter who she says just turned three. Alex reveals that his father pressured him into marrying someone else and that he never regretted anything more than leaving her. The conversation soon escalates into a passionate affair. The next morning, however, Lily resolutely tells Alex that she has no desire to rekindle their relationship or to see him again, and they go their separate ways. As Alex leaves the station, he happens to find out from Susan that Lily's daughter, Alexandra (Lexa), is actually nine years old. Believing that he must be the girl's father, Alex decides to follow Lily and Susan to Paris.

Meanwhile, Lily tearfully regrets her decision to send Alex away and for not telling him the truth about their daughter, fearing she will never love again; she has decided to marry the man she has planned to meet in London upon their arrival. Alex arrives in Paris by car and frantically searches for them. He finds Lily with Susan and Lexa at a bistro where he promised to meet her 10 years ago. Alex weeps seeing Lexa and Lily, having fulfilled a promise he once failed to keep. Encouraged by Susan, Lily walks over to the remorseful Alex and embraces him, and Lexa joins her parents.

== Cast ==
- Cheryl Ladd as Lily Parker
- Stuart Wilson as Alex Woodward
- John Gielgud as Theodore Woodward
- Ruby Wax as Susan Lawson
- Danielle Tylke as Lexa
- Julian Sands as Sandy
- Betsy Brantley as Stacey
- Renée Asherson as Beatrice
- Ralph Michael as Harry
- Barry Stokes as Flavio

== Production ==
The film was shot on location in Italy, France and England. Shortly before its premiere, Cheryl Ladd expressed her delight in Romance on the Orient Express, because the film, due to its time span of 10 years, allowed her to play two different characters.

== Awards and nominations ==
Year	Award	Category	Nominee	Result	Ref.
1985	37th Primetime Emmy Awards	Outstanding Supporting Actor in a Limited Series or a Special	John Gielgud	Nominated	
