= 37th Primetime Emmy Awards =

1985 American television programming awards

- Date: September 22, 1985 (Ceremony); September 21, 1985 (Creative Arts Awards)
- Location: Pasadena Civic Auditorium, Pasadena, California
- Presented by: Academy of Television Arts and Sciences
- Hosted by: John Forsythe

Highlights
- Most awards: Cagney & Lacey (4)
- Most nominations: Cheers (11)
- Outstanding Comedy Series: The Cosby Show
- Outstanding Drama Series: Cagney & Lacey
- Outstanding Limited Series: The Jewel in the Crown
- Outstanding Variety, Music or Comedy Program: Motown Returns to the Apollo

Television/radio coverage
- Network: ABC

The 37th Primetime Emmy Awards were held on September 22, 1985. The ceremony was broadcast on ABC, from the Pasadena Civic Auditorium, Pasadena, California. 26 awards were presented.

The Cosby Show defeated two-time reigning champion Cheers to win Outstanding Comedy Series, one of three major awards it won. Although it only took home one major award, Cheers did tie the then-record for most major nominations by a comedy series (11), set by The Mary Tyler Moore Show in 1977. In the drama field, Cagney & Lacey, en route to winning four major awards on the night, defeated presumed favorite Miami Vice to win Outstanding Drama Series; four-time defending champion Hill Street Blues still received nine major nominations, but only won one award. This was Hill Street Blues 18th and final major award, setting an Emmy record for a drama series that still stands and was later achieved by The Sopranos.

The ceremony also had a memorable unscripted moment involving the arrest of impersonator Barry Bremen for grand theft while attempting to accept the Outstanding Supporting Actress in a Drama Series award on behalf of Betty Thomas, who would show up on the auditorium stage a few minutes late.

== Winners and nominees ==
=== Programs ===
Programs
Outstanding Comedy Series: The Cosby Show (NBC); Cheers (NBC); Family Ties (NBC); Kate & Allie (CBS); Night Court (NBC)	Outstanding Drama Series: Cagney & Lacey (CBS); Hill Street Blues (NBC); Miami Vice (NBC); Murder, She Wrote (CBS); St. Elsewhere (NBC)
Outstanding Drama/Comedy Special: Do You Remember Love (CBS); The Burning Bed (NBC); Fatal Vision (NBC); Heartsounds (ABC); Wallenberg: A Hero's Story (NBC)	Outstanding Limited Series: The Jewel in the Crown (PBS); Ellis Island (CBS); Robert Kennedy & His Times (CBS); Space (CBS); A Woman of Substance (Syndicated)
Outstanding Variety, Music or Comedy Program: Motown Returns to the Apollo (NBC); AFI Life Achievement Award: A Tribute to Gene Kelly (CBS); Great Performances: "Lena Horne: The Lady and Her Music" (PBS); Late Night with David Letterman (NBC); The Tonight Show Starring Johnny Carson (NBC)

=== Acting ===
==== Lead performances ====
Acting
Outstanding Lead Actor in a Comedy Series: Robert Guillaume as Benson DuBois in Benson (ABC); Harry Anderson as Judge Harry T. Stone in Night Court (NBC); Ted Danson as Sam Malone in Cheers (NBC); Bob Newhart as Dick Loudon in Newhart (CBS); Jack Warden as Harrison Fox Sr. in Crazy Like a Fox (CBS)	Outstanding Lead Actress in a Comedy Series: Jane Curtin as Allison Lowell in Kate & Allie (CBS); Shelley Long as Diane Chambers in Cheers (NBC); Phylicia Rashad as Clair Huxtable in The Cosby Show (NBC); Susan Saint James as Katherine McArdle in Kate & Allie (CBS); Isabel Sanford as Louise Jefferson in The Jeffersons (CBS)
Outstanding Lead Actor in a Drama Series: William Daniels as Dr. Mark Craig in St. Elsewhere (NBC); Ed Flanders as Dr. Donald Westphall in St. Elsewhere (NBC); Don Johnson as Det. James Crockett in Miami Vice (NBC); Tom Selleck as Thomas Magnum in Magnum, P.I. (CBS); Daniel J. Travanti as Capt. Frank Furillo in Hill Street Blues (NBC)	Outstanding Lead Actress in a Drama Series: Tyne Daly as Mary Beth Lacey in Cagney & Lacey (CBS) (Episode: "Who Said It's Fair?"); Debbie Allen as Lydia Grant in Fame (Syndicated); Sharon Gless as Christine Cagney in Cagney & Lacey (CBS); Veronica Hamel as Joyce Davenport in Hill Street Blues (NBC); Angela Lansbury as Jessica Fletcher in Murder, She Wrote (CBS)
Outstanding Lead Actor in a Limited Series or a Special: Richard Crenna as Richard Beck in The Rape of Richard Beck (ABC); Richard Chamberlain as Raoul Wallenberg in Wallenberg: A Hero's Story (NBC); James Garner as Harold Lear in Heartsounds (ABC); Richard Kiley as George Hollis in Do You Remember Love (CBS); George C. Scott as Ebenezer Scrooge in A Christmas Carol (CBS)	Outstanding Lead Actress in a Limited Series or a Special: Joanne Woodward as Barbara Wyatt-Hollis in Do You Remember Love (CBS); Jane Alexander as Hedda Hopper in Malice in Wonderland (CBS); Peggy Ashcroft as Barbie Batchelor in The Jewel in the Crown (PBS); Farrah Fawcett as Francine Hughes in The Burning Bed (NBC); Mary Tyler Moore as Martha Weinman Lear in Heartsounds (ABC)

==== Supporting performances ====
Outstanding Supporting Actor in a Comedy Series: John Larroquette as Dan Fielding in Night Court (NBC) (Episode: "Dan's Parents or Married Alive"); Nicholas Colasanto (posthumously) as Coach Ernie Pantusso in Cheers (NBC); Michael J. Fox as Alex P. Keaton in Family Ties (NBC); John Ratzenberger as Cliff Clavin in Cheers (NBC); George Wendt as Norm Peterson in Cheers (NBC)	Outstanding Supporting Actress in a Comedy Series: Rhea Perlman as Carla Tortelli in Cheers (NBC); Selma Diamond (posthumously) as Selma Hacker in Night Court (NBC); Julia Duffy as Stephanie Vanderkellen in Newhart (CBS); Marla Gibbs as Florence Johnston in The Jeffersons (CBS); Inga Swenson as Gretchen Wilomena Kraus in Benson (ABC)
Outstanding Supporting Actor in a Drama Series: Edward James Olmos as Martin Castillo in Miami Vice (NBC) (Episode: "Golden Triangle"); Ed Begley Jr. as Dr. Victor Ehrlich in St. Elsewhere (NBC); John Hillerman as Higgins in Magnum, P.I. (CBS); John Karlen as Harvey Lacey in Cagney & Lacey (CBS); Bruce Weitz as Det. Mick Belker in Hill Street Blues (NBC)	Outstanding Supporting Actress in a Drama Series: Betty Thomas as Sgt. Lucille Bates in Hill Street Blues (NBC); Barbara Bosson as Fay Furillo in Hill Street Blues (NBC); Christina Pickles as Nurse Helen Rosenthal in St. Elsewhere (NBC); Doris Roberts as Mildred Krebs in Remington Steele (NBC); Madge Sinclair as Nurse Ernestine Shoop in Trapper John, M.D. (CBS)
Outstanding Supporting Actor in a Limited Series or a Special: Karl Malden as Freddy Kassab in Fatal Vision (NBC); Richard Burton (posthumously) as Sen. Phipps Ogden in Ellis Island (CBS); John Gielgud as Theodore Woodward in Romance on the Orient Express (NBC); Richard Masur as Aryon Greydanus in The Burning Bed (NBC); Rip Torn as Lewis Slaton in The Atlanta Child Murders (CBS)	Outstanding Supporting Actress in a Limited Series or a Special: Kim Stanley as Big Mama in Cat on a Hot Tin Roof (PBS); Penny Fuller as Mae in Cat on a Hot Tin Roof (PBS); Ann Jillian as Nellie Byfield in Ellis Island (CBS); Deborah Kerr as Emma Harte in A Woman of Substance (Syndicated); Alfre Woodard as Claudie Sills in Words by Heart (PBS)

==== Individual performances ====
Outstanding Individual Performance in a Variety or Music Program
- George Hearn – Great Performances: "Sweeney Todd" (PBS)
  - Billy Crystal – Saturday Night Live (NBC)
  - Gregory Hines – Motown Returns to the Apollo (NBC)
  - Patti LaBelle – Motown Returns to the Apollo (NBC)
  - Angela Lansbury – Great Performances: "Sweeney Todd" (PBS)

=== Directing ===
Directing
Outstanding Directing in a Comedy Series: The Cosby Show (NBC): "The Younger Woman" – Jay Sandrich; Alice (CBS): "Tommy's Lost Weekend" – Marc Daniels; Cheers (NBC): "Cheerio" – James Burrows; Kate & Allie (CBS): "Landlady" – Bill Persky; Moonlighting (ABC): "Pilot" – Robert Butler	Outstanding Directing in a Drama Series: Cagney & Lacey (CBS): "Heat" – Karen Arthur; Hill Street Blues (NBC): "El Capitan" – Georg Stanford Brown; Hill Street Blues (NBC): "The Rise and Fall of Paul the Wall" – Thomas Carter; Miami Vice (NBC): "Cool Runnin" – Lee H. Katzin; Miami Vice (NBC): "Smuggler's Blues" – Paul Michael Glaser
Outstanding Directing in a Variety or Music Program: Great Performances: "Sweeney Todd" (PBS) – Terry Hughes; Late Night with David Letterman 3rd Anniversary Special (NBC) – Hal Gurnee; Motown Returns to the Apollo (PBS) – Don Mischer; Night of 100 Stars II (ABC) – Clark Jones	Outstanding Directing in a Limited Series or a Special: Wallenberg: A Hero's Story (NBC) – Lamont Johnson; The Burning Bed (NBC) – Robert Greenwald; Consenting Adult (ABC) – Gilbert Cates; Do You Remember Love (CBS) – Jeff Bleckner; Fatal Vision (NBC) – David Greene; The Jewel in the Crown (PBS): "Crossing the River" – Christopher Morahan and Jim O'Brien

=== Writing ===
Writing
Outstanding Writing in a Comedy Series: The Cosby Show (NBC): "Pilot" – Ed. Weinberger and Michael Leeson; Cheers (NBC): "I Call Your Name" – Peter Casey and David Lee; Cheers (NBC): "Rebound, Part II" – Glen Charles and Les Charles; Cheers (NBC): "Sam Turns the Other Cheek" – David Lloyd; The Cosby Show (NBC): "Good-Bye Mr. Fish" – Earl Pomerantz	Outstanding Writing in a Drama Series: Cagney & Lacey (CBS): "Who Said It's Fair, Part II" – Patricia Green; Cagney & Lacey (CBS): "Child Witness" – Deborah Arakelian; Hill Street Blues (NBC): "The Rise and Fall of Paul the Wall" – Story by : Michael Wagner Teleplay by : Jacob Epstein; Miami Vice (NBC): "Pilot" – Anthony Yerkovich; St. Elsewhere (NBC): "Murder, She Rote" – Tom Fontana, John Masius and Steve Bello; St. Elsewhere (NBC): "Sweet Dreams" – John Masius and Tom Fontana
Outstanding Writing in a Variety or Music Program: Late Night with David Letterman (NBC): "Christmas with the Lettermans"; AFI Life Achievement Award: A Tribute to Gene Kelly (CBS); Late Night with David Letterman (NBC): "Late Night in Los Angeles"; Late Night with David Letterman (NBC): "The Late Night Morning Show"; Motown Returns to the Apollo (NBC)	Outstanding Writing in a Limited Series or a Special: Do You Remember Love (CBS) – Vickie Patik; The Burning Bed (NBC) – Rose Leiman Goldemberg; Fatal Vision (NBC) – John Gay; The Jewel in the Crown (PBS): "Crossing the River" – Ken Taylor; Wallenberg: A Hero's Story (NBC) – Gerald Green

== Most major nominations ==
Networks with multiple major nominations (Note: "Major" constitutes the categories listed above: Program, Acting, Directing, and Writing. Does not include the technical categories.)
Network	Number of Nominations
NBC	66
CBS	37
PBS	10

Programs with multiple major nominations
Program	Category	Network	Number of Nominations
Cheers	Comedy	NBC	11
Hill Street Blues	Drama	NBC	9
Cagney & Lacey	Drama	CBS	7
St. Elsewhere	Drama	NBC	7
Miami Vice	Drama	NBC	6
The Burning Bed	Special	NBC	5
The Cosby Show	Comedy	NBC	5
Do You Remember Love	Special	CBS	5
Late Night with David Letterman	Variety	NBC	5
Motown Returns to the Apollo	Variety	NBC	5
Fatal Vision	Special	NBC	4
The Jewel in the Crown	Limited	PBS	4
Kate & Allie	Comedy	CBS	4
Night Court	Comedy	NBC	4
Wallenberg: A Hero's Story	Special	NBC	4
Ellis Island	Limited	CBS	3
Great Performances: "Sweeney Todd"	Variety	PBS	3
Heartsounds	Special	ABC	3
AFI Life Achievement Award: A Tribute to Gene Kelly	Variety	CBS	2
Benson	Comedy	ABC	2
Cat on a Hot Tin Roof	Special	PBS	2
Family Ties	Comedy	NBC	2
The Jeffersons	Comedy	CBS	2
Magnum, P.I.	Drama	CBS	2
Murder, She Wrote	Drama	CBS	2
Newhart	Comedy	CBS	2
A Woman of Substance	Limited	Syndicated	2

== Most major awards ==
Networks with multiple major awards
Network	Number of Awards
NBC	12
CBS	8
PBS	4
ABC	2

Programs with multiple major awards
Program	Category	Network	Number of Awards
Cagney & Lacey	Drama	CBS	4
The Cosby Show	Comedy	NBC	3
Do You Remember Love	Special	CBS	3
Great Performances: "Sweeney Todd"	Variety	PBS	2
