= Monstrous Regiment Theatre Company =

British feminist theater company

Monstrous Regiment Theatre Company is a British feminist theatre company established in 1975. Monstrous Regiment went on to produce and perform 30 major shows, in which the main focus was on women's lives and experiences. Performer-led and collectively organised, its work figures prominently in studies of feminist theatre in Britain during the 1970s and 1980s. No productions have been mounted since 1993, when financial support from the Arts Council of Great Britain was discontinued.

== History ==
The company's name referred ironically to the title of John Knox's sixteenth-century pamphlet, The First Blast of the Trumpet Against the Monstruous Regiment of Women. Reacting to what they saw as the marginal status and stereotypical depiction of women in both conventional and political theatre of the time, its founding members decided to create a radical alternative that would provide serious opportunities for women as actors, writers, directors, designers and technicians. Amongst the founding members were three who were to remain actively involved throughout its history: Chris Bowler (until her death in May 2014), Gillian Hanna, and Mary McCusker. Along with Katrina Duncan, they have constituted the directorial board of the (still extant) company since the early 1990s. Men were not excluded from the company, but women were to predominate both on-stage and off-stage.

With a commitment to promoting new writing, and to close collaboration with the writers it commissioned, Monstrous Regiment explored a variety of theatrical forms in its work, including epic theatre, cabaret, and performance art, and its productions ranged from large-scale ensemble pieces to one-woman shows. Specially written live music was integral to many of them. Despite its feminist (and socialist) political impetus, its work was essentially theatrical, rather than issue-based or agitprop in character.

== Archives ==
Along with other feminist companies such as the Women's Theatre Group, Monstrous Regiment contributed to the broader development of alternative theatre that emerged in Britain in the post-1968 period, with a proliferation of new touring companies performing to new audiences. The ongoing Unfinished Histories project provides a rich source of information about these companies, including Monstrous Regiment. Together with the texts of four plays, an account of the company's development is presented in the editorial introduction to Monstrous Regiment: A Collective Celebration, to which many of its members contributed.

The company's archives (including records of meetings, production photographs, posters and flyers, design sketches, and annotated scripts) are lodged with the Theatre and Performance Archives at the Victoria and Albert Museum; a complete online catalogue is now available. They had previously been located in The Women's Library at the London School of Economics. An official Monstrous Regiment website was launched early in 2019, using this archive material to document and illustrate the history and achievements of the company.

== See also ==
- Vinegar Tom
- Political drama
- Feminism
