= Thom Mount =

American film producer

- Born: May 26, 1948 (age 78); United States
- Occupation: Studio executive

Thomas Henderson Mount (born May 26, 1948) is an American film producer who was formerly the president of Universal Pictures. Born in Durham, North Carolina, he studied art at Bard College where he received a BA. He received an MFA in Film and Video at the California Institute of the Arts.

Starting as assistant to Universal executive vice president Ned Tanen in 1972, Mount rose quickly through the ranks to become president of the studio in 1975. During his time as Universal president, Mount developed, supervised, financed and distributed over 200 features. After leaving the studio in late 1984, Mount founded his own company, the Mount Company, which produced acclaimed films like Bull Durham, Tequila Sunrise, Frantic, Natural Born Killers, Can't Buy Me Love, The Indian Runner, Night Falls on Manhattan, and Death and the Maiden (which he first produced on stage in London's West End and on Broadway). Although the Mount Company had outgoing agreements with various film studios like Warner Bros., Tri-Star Pictures, The Walt Disney Studios and Lorimar Motion Pictures, on June 11, 1986, the Mount Company received a three-year, two-picture-a-year, non-exclusive deal with Columbia Pictures, in which Mount would develop projects for the studio.

Mount is a co-founder of the Los Angeles Film School, two-term president of the Producers Guild of America, and has been a consultant for RKO Pictures. He has been an active Academy member since 1977.

Frequently rumored to be the model for Robert Altman's The Player, Mount said it was "not me. I've never murdered a screenwriter."

== Filmography ==
He was a producer in all films unless otherwise noted.

=== Film ===
Year	Film	Credit
1985	My Man Adam	Executive producer
1986	Jo Jo Dancer, Your Life Is Calling	Supervising producer
1986	Pirates	Executive producer
1987	Can't Buy Me Love	
1988	Frantic	
1988	Bull Durham	
1988	Stealing Home	
1988	Tequila Sunrise	
1990	Frankenstein Unbound	Executive producer
1991	The Indian Runner	Executive producer
1994	Natural Born Killers	Executive producer
1994	Death and the Maiden	
1996	Night Falls on Manhattan	
2007	Are We Done Yet?	Supervising producer
2007	Have Dreams, Will Travel	Executive producer
2008	Bathory	Executive producer
2009	Chéri	Executive producer
2009	In Her Skin	Executive producer
TBA	Good Luck with That	

Thanks

Year	Film	Role
1986	Jo Jo Dancer, Your Life Is Calling	Special thanks
1991	My Own Private Idaho	Special thanks
2019	Animal Among Us	Very special thanks

=== Television ===
Year	Title	Credit	Notes
1988	Open Admissions		Television film
1991	Son of the Morning Star		Television film
1999	The Mark Twain Prize: Richard Pryor	Co-producer	Television special
