= Stuart Wilson (actor) =

English actor

- Born: Stuart Conan Wilson; 25 December 1946 (age 79); Guildford, Surrey, England
- Education: Royal Academy of Dramatic Art (RADA)
- Occupation: Actor
- Years active: 1971–present
- Spouse(s): Courtney Pledger (m. 1990)
- Children: 3

Stuart Conan Wilson (born 25 December 1946) is an English actor of film, television, and stage who is best known for his villainous and supporting roles in popular films like Teenage Mutant Ninja Turtles III (1993), Lethal Weapon 3 (1992), The Age of Innocence (1993), No Escape (1994), Death and the Maiden (1994), The Mask of Zorro (1998), The Rock (1996), Enemy of the State (1998), Vertical Limit (2000), and Hot Fuzz (2007).

== Early life ==
Stuart Conan Wilson was born on 25 December 1946 in Guildford, Surrey, to an RAF family, and consequently had a varied educational history, spending much of his early childhood in Rhodesia where his father worked as a mining engineer. Having moved to London, he trained at the Royal Academy of Dramatic Art. After leaving RADA he played in theatres during the 1960s and 1970s. He has played major roles with the Royal Shakespeare Company, the Royal Court Theatre, London's West End, regional, touring and many Fringe productions, most particularly at London's Bush Theatre.

== Career ==
Wilson's first break was when he was chosen for the leading role of Johann Strauss II in the 1972 ITV costume drama The Strauss Family. He subsequently made many appearances on British television, his credits including Space: 1999, I, Claudius, Special Branch, The Sweeney, Return of the Saint, The Pallisers, Anna Karenina, The Professionals, Tales of the Unexpected, The Adventures of Sherlock Holmes, The Old Men at the Zoo, The Jewel in the Crown and Prime Suspect.

=== Film credits ===
As a more mature actor, Wilson made the transition to Hollywood, often playing villains. His film credits include Dulcima, Wetherby, Lethal Weapon 3, No Escape, Enemy of the State, The Rock (uncredited), The Age of Innocence, Teenage Mutant Ninja Turtles III, Death and the Maiden, The Prisoner of Zenda, Slow Burn, The Mask of Zorro and Hot Fuzz. He also appeared in television films, such as Secret Weapon, Coins in the Fountain, Her Wicked Ways and Princess of Thieves.

=== Later television work ===
Wilson made fewer television appearances after his transition to film, but has continued to appear in series such as Midsomer Murders (2008), Spooks (2008), and Crossbones.

== Filmography ==
=== Film ===
| Year | Title | Role | Notes |
|---|---|---|---|
| 1971 | Dulcima | Gamekeeper | |
| 1979 | The Prisoner of Zenda | Rupert of Hentzau | |
| 1982 | The Highest Honor | Lt. General Ivan Lyon | |
| 1984 | Nineteen Eighty-Four | Outer Party Official | Uncredited |
| 1985 | Romance on the Orient Express | Alex Woodward | |
| 1985 | Wetherby | Mike Langdon | |
| 1989 | Fool's Mate | Nikos Mitradis | |
| 1992 | Lethal Weapon 3 | Jack Travis | |
| 1993 | Teenage Mutant Ninja Turtles III | Walker | |
| 1993 | The Age of Innocence | Julius Beaufort | |
| 1994 | No Escape | Walter Marek | |
| 1994 | Exit to Eden | Omar | |
| 1994 | Death and the Maiden | Geraldo Escobar | |
| 1996 | Edie & Pen | Victor | |
| 1996 | The Rock | General Al Kramer | Uncredited |
| 1996 | Crossworlds | Ferris | |
| 1998 | The Mask of Zorro | Don Rafael Montero | |
| 1998 | Enemy of the State | Congressman Sam Albert | |
| 2000 | Here on Earth | John Morse | |
| 2000 | The Luzhin Defence | Leonid Valentinov | |
| 2000 | Slow Burn | Frank Norris | |
| 2000 | Vertical Limit | Royce Garrett | |
| 2004 | Some Things That Stay | Stuart Anderson | |
| 2004 | Unstoppable | Alex Sullivan | |
| 2004 | Fascination | Oliver Vance | |
| 2006 | Perfect Creature | Brother Augustus | |
| 2007 | Hot Fuzz | Dr. Robin Hatcher | |
| 2007 | Grindhouse | Old Man | Segment: "Don't" |
| 2016 | Marauders | Hubert's Double | |

=== Television ===
| Year | Title | Role | Notes |
|---|---|---|---|
| 1969, 1975 | BBC Play of the Month | Strato / Gerald Forbes | Episodes: "Julius Caesar" & "When We Are Married" |
| 1972 | Jason King | Marko | Episode: "Zenia" |
| 1972 | New Scotland Yard | Constable Nash | Episode: "Memory of the Gauntlet" |
| 1972 | The Strauss Family | Johann Strauss II | Main role; Series 1 |
| 1972 | The Main Chance | Ed Ransom | Episodes: "Where Did I Leave My Shining Armor?" & "Choice of Jungles" |
| 1973 | The Adventurer | Brian Hamilton | Episode: "The Case of the Poisoned Pawn" |
| 1973 | The Song of Songs | Lt. Von Prell | Miniseries |
| 1973 | Hadleigh | Jeremy Simon | Episode: "Gentlemen and Prayers" |
| 1974 | Special Branch | Steven Gill | Episode: "Double Exposure" |
| 1974 | The Protectors | Smith | Episode: "The Insider" |
| 1974 | The Pallisers | Ferdinand Lopez | Recurring role; Series 1 |
| 1974 | Haunted: Poor Girl | Oliver Wilson | Television film |
| 1975 | Thriller | Max Burns | Episode: "The Double Kill" |
| 1975 | Affairs of the Heart | Lord Mark | Episode: "Milly" |
| 1975, 1978 | The Sweeney | DI Ken Knowles / Jimmy Knox | Episodes: "Abduction" & "Latin Lady" |
| 1976 | I, Claudius | Gaius Silius | Miniseries |
| 1976 | Space: 1999 | Vindrus | Episode: "A Matter of Balance" |
| 1977 | Anna Karenina | Count Alexei Kirillovich Vronsky | Miniseries |
| 1977 | Moths | Correze | Television film |
| 1978 | Crown Court | Bob Turner | Episode: "Still Life with Feathers: Part 1" |
| 1979 | Running Blind | Alan Stewart | Miniseries |
| 1979 | Return of the Saint | Manfred | Episode: "Appointment in Florence" |
| 1980 | The Professionals | Van Neikerk | Episode: "Slush Fund" |
| 1982 | Ivanhoe | Maurice de Bracy | Television film |
| 1982 | We'll Meet Again | Sid Davis | Recurring role; Series 1 |
| 1983 | Tales of the Unexpected | Dave Brigham | Episode: "A Sad Loss" |
| 1983 | The Old Men at the Zoo | Simon Carter | Main role; Series 1 |
| 1984 | The Jewel in the Crown | Capt. James Clarke | Miniseries |
| 1984 | Scarecrow and Mrs. King | Lt. Volkenauer | Episode: "Our Man in Tegernsee" |
| 1985 | Romance on the Orient Express | Alex Woodward | Television film |
| 1985 | Wallenberg: A Hero's Story | Baron Gábor Kemény | Television film |
| 1986 | Sherlock Holmes | Rt. Honourable Trelawney Hope | Episode: "The Second Stain" |
| 1986 | The Deliberate Death of a Polish Priest | Grzegorz Piotrowski | Television film |
| 1987 | Worlds Beyond | Guy Bellamy | Episode: "Captain Randolph" |
| 1987 | London Embassy | Artyem Kirilov | Miniseries |
| 1987 | Way Upstream | Vince | Television film |
| 1988 | Wild Things | Andrew | Television film |
| 1988–1989 | Nonni and Manni | Magnus Hansson | Main role; Series 1 |
| 1989 | Voice of the Heart | Mike Lazarus | Television film |
| 1989 | A Peaceable Kingdom | Ian Fielding | Episode: "Moonstruck" |
| 1990 | Secret Weapon | Peter Hounam | Television film |
| 1990 | Coins in the Fountain | Marcello | Television film |
| 1991 | Her Wicked Ways | Peter Chambers | Television film |
| 1991 | To Be the Best | Jack Miller | Miniseries |
| 1995 | Prime Suspect | Dr. Patrick Schofeld | Episodes: "The Lost Child" & "The Scent of Darkness" |
| 1997 | Rose Hill | Richard Elliot | Television film |
| 2000 | Second Sight | Adam Bendrix / Jack Kenworthy | Episodes: "Pilot Pt. 1" & "Pilot Pt. 2" |
| 2001 | Princess of Thieves | Robin Of Locksley | Television film |
| 2002 | Dinotopia | Frank Scott | Miniseries |
| 2008 | Heroes and Villains | Duke of Burgundy | Episode: "Richard the Lionheart" |
| 2008 | Midsomer Murders | Aloysius Wilmington | Episode: "The Magician's Nephew" |
| 2008 | Spooks | Arkardy Katchimov | Recurring role; Series 7 |
| 2014 | Crossbones | Captain Sam Valentine | Episode: "The Covenant" |
