= Frantic (film) =

1988 film by Roman Polanski

- Theatrical release poster
- Directed by: Roman Polanski
- Written by: Roman Polanski; Gérard Brach; Robert Towne
- Produced by: Tim Hampton; Thom Mount
- Starring: Harrison Ford; Betty Buckley; John Mahoney; Emmanuelle Seigner
- Cinematography: Witold Sobociński
- Edited by: Sam O'Steen
- Music by: Ennio Morricone
- Production companies: Warner Bros.; The Mount Company
- Distributed by: Warner Bros.
- Release dates: February 16, 1988 (United Kingdom); February 26, 1988 (United States); March 30, 1988 (France)
- Running time: 120 minutes
- Countries: United States; France
- Languages: English; French
- Budget: $20 million
- Box office: $17.6 million (US)

Frantic is a 1988 neo-noir mystery thriller film co-written and directed by Roman Polanski and starring Harrison Ford and Emmanuelle Seigner. Ennio Morricone composed the film score. Although a commercial failure, the film was a critical success, and has since gone on to become a cult classic, with Morricone's score being hailed as one of his best.

== Plot ==
Dr. Richard Walker is a surgeon visiting Paris with his wife Sondra for a medical conference. At their hotel, she is unable to unlock her suitcase, and Walker determines that she picked up the wrong one at the airport. While Walker is taking a shower, Sondra receives a phone call that Walker can't hear, and she mysteriously disappears from their hotel room.

Still jet-lagged, Walker searches for his wife in the hotel with the help of a polite but mostly indifferent staff and then wanders outside to look for her himself. A wino overhears him in a café and says he saw Sondra being forced into a car in a nearby alley. Walker is skeptical, until he finds his wife's ID bracelet on the cobblestones. He contacts the Paris police and the U.S. Embassy, but their responses are bureaucratic, and there is little hope anyone will bother looking for her. As Walker carries on the search himself he stumbles onto a murder site where he encounters the streetwise young Michelle, who mistook Sondra's suitcase for her own at the airport. He realises that Michelle is a career drug smuggler but does not care or know for which shady dealers she is hired. Michelle reluctantly helps Walker in his attempt to learn what was packed in her switched suitcase and how to trade the contents for the return of his kidnapped wife.

Following their visit to Michelle's apartment, Walker's hotel room, and shabby cabarets, it turns out that the smuggled contents are not drugs, but a krytron, an electronic switch used as a detonator for nuclear weapons, stolen and smuggled inside a souvenir replica of the Statue of Liberty, on orders of some Arab country's agents. The American embassy, working with Israeli agents, wants to get hold of the precious device, and they have no problem letting Sondra die for it. In order to save his wife, Walker joins forces with Michelle, who is only interested in getting her paycheck.

The film finishes with a confrontation on the Île aux Cygnes, in the middle of the Seine, next to the Paris Statue of Liberty replica, where Sondra is to be released in exchange for the krytron. However, a gunfight ensues between the Arab agents who were to get the precious device and the Israeli Mossad secret agents who traced them to get hold of it. The Arabs are killed in the crossfire, but Michelle is hit too, dying soon after having slipped the krytron into Walker's pocket, with Sondra at their side. Furious, Walker shows the krytron device to the Israeli agents before he throws it into the Seine. He carries Michelle's body away, ready to leave Paris with his wife.

== Cast ==
- Harrison Ford as Dr. Richard Walker
- Emmanuelle Seigner as Michelle
- Betty Buckley as Sondra Walker
- Gérard Klein as Gaillard
- Jacques Ciron as the hotel manager
- Dominique Pinon as wino
- Yves Rénier as the French inspector
- Robert M. Ground as the former cop
- John Mahoney as US Embassy official Williams
- Jimmie Ray Weeks as embassy security chief Shaap
- Thomas M. Pollard as the pusher
- Marcel Bluwal as the senior interrogator
- Patrick Floersheim as the hot-tempered interrogator
- Yorgo Voyagis as the kidnapper
- David Huddleston as Peter
- Alexandra Stewart as Edie
- Artus de Penguern as waiter
- Roman Polanski as cabbie with matchbook
- Bruce Johnson as the marine
- David Jalil
- Raouf Ben Amor as Dr. Metlaoui
- Richard Dieux as desk cop
- Jean-Pierre Delage
- Ella Jaroszewicz as restroom attendant
- Tina Sportolaro as TWA clerk
- Patrice Melennec as hotel detective
- Alan Ladd as groom
- Marc Dudicourt as café owner
- Louise Vincent as tourist
- Roch Leibovici as bellboy #2
- Alain Doutey as hall porter #2
- Laurent Spielvogel as hall porter #2
- Dominique Virton as desk clerk
- Boll Boyer as Dede Martin
- Stephane D'Audeville as bellboy #1
- Djiby Soumare as taxi driver #1

== Production ==
=== Filming ===
Filming took place on location in Paris from 21 April 1987 to 18 August 1987, with exteriors filmed outside Le Grand Hotel in rue Scribe in the 9th arrondissement. The hotel's lobby also appeared in the film. Filming also took place at the Île aux Cygnes island in the Seine for the Lady Liberty scenes.

== Release ==
Frantic was released in the United Kingdom on February 16, 1988, followed by the United States on February 26 and France on March 30.

=== Box office ===
The film was a disappointment at the box office with a domestic gross of $17,637,950, failing to recoup its production budget. However, the film was more successful in other countries such as France, where it received 1,293,721 admissions.

=== Critical reception ===
Although a commercial failure in the US, Frantic was a critical success. Review aggregator Rotten Tomatoes calculated a score of 77% based on 44 critical reviews with an average rating of 6.4/10; the site's consensus reads, "A tense, on-point thriller in the vein of Polanski's earlier work." Metacritic calculated an average score of 66 out of 100 based on 16 reviews, indicating "generally favorable" reviews. Audiences polled by CinemaScore gave the film an average grade of "B−" on an A+ to F scale.

The film received "two thumbs up" from Gene Siskel and Roger Ebert on their program At the Movies. Ebert, in his review, gave the film three out of four stars, saying: "to watch the opening sequences of Frantic is to be reminded of Polanski's talent. Here is one of the few modern masters of the thriller and the film noir. Frantic is a reminder of how absorbing a good thriller can be."

Pat Collins of WWOR-TV called it "Polanski's best film ever". Desson Howe, of The Washington Post, called the movie "vintage Polanski", with its relentless paranoia, irony, diffident strangers and nutty cameos. British film magazine Empire rated the movie three out of five, calling it Polanski's most satisfying film since Chinatown (1974), and one of the best traditional thrillers to come down the pike in quite some time.

=== Home media ===
It was released on DVD on June 1, 2004, in Region 1.

== In popular culture ==
The film's title, along with Ford, are mentioned in the 1998 Barenaked Ladies song "One Week".
