= Half the Sky Feminist Theatre =

Canadian community-based theatre group

Half the Sky Feminist Theatre is a community-based women's theatre group in Hamilton, Ontario. The theatre company is one of a number of women-supportive and women's theatre companies in Canada that work to remedy and redress the scarcity of women as playwrights and leading actors in the Canadian theatre industry.

Founded in 1982 after a women's center conference Sheila Simpson from Ireland had read about feminist theatre in Montreal Pol Pelliter and she suggested doing a play. in the wake of a performance by at a conference hosted by the Hamilton Women's Centre, the group has written or performed a number of plays by, for, and about women. By 1986 The Hamilton Spectator had recognized the theatre troupe as "one of several independent groups bubbling just below the surface of Hamilton's established theatre companies... [and] trying to get off the ground to bring Hamilton's cultural community a dramatic alternative." Some of Half the Sky's performances include: its first production, Hot Flashes (collectively written, performed 1983); Take a Midol Martha (Grace Eaman, performed 1983); Moon Tree (Martha Boesing, performed 1985); Last Summer at Bluefish Cove (Jane Chambers, performed 1987); Albertine in Five Times (Michel Tremblay, performed 1988); Going Up (Julia Willis, performed 1990); Collateral Damage (Jackie Crossland, performed 1993); Eleemosynary (Lee Blessing, performed 1994); Hannah Free (Claudia Allen, a play about LGBT ageing performed for the public as well as for McMaster University's Research Centre for the Promotion of Women's Health in 1997); Good Help is so Hard to Murder (Pat Cook, performed 2008); and Random Acts (Diane Flacks, performed 2009).
