= Winnipeg Fringe Theatre Festival =

Fringe festival in Manitoba

Coordinates: 49.897°N 97.137°W

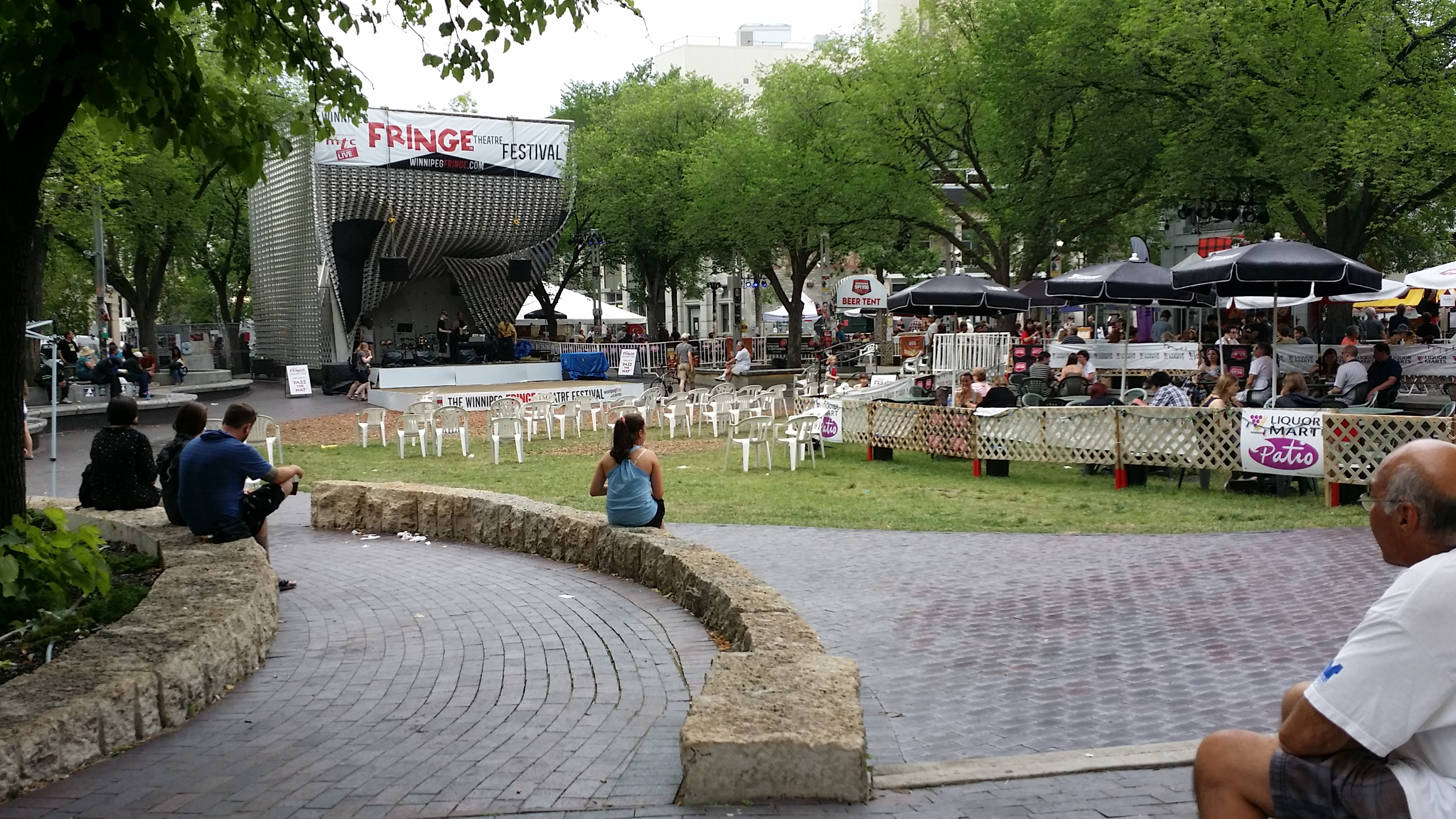
- Winnipeg Fringe Festival at the Cube in Market Square
- Nickname: Winnipeg Fringe
- Genre: Fringe theatre
- Location: Winnipeg, Manitoba
- Inaugurated: 1988; 38 years ago
- Founder: Manitoba Theatre Centre
- Most recent: July 15-26, 2026
- Executive Producer: Chuck McEwen
- Organiser: Royal Manitoba Theatre Centre
- Website: winnipegfringe.com

The Winnipeg Fringe Theatre Festival is a 12-day alternative theatre festival held each year in July in Winnipeg, Manitoba, Canada.

Primarily held in venues in Winnipeg's historic Exchange District, it currently ranks as the second-largest independent fringe theatre festival in North America. The festival is presented by the Royal Manitoba Theatre Centre, the only regional theatre in Canada to produce a fringe festival.

== Overview ==
The festival has three key principles:

1. The festival is non-juried.
2. Artists have the freedom to present whatever they want on stage, and
3. 100% of the box office goes directly to the artists (though artists must pay a flat fee to enter).

Chuck McEwen, former director of the Toronto Fringe Festival, is the current executive producer and has been in charge since 2008.

Winnipeg Fringe is modelled on the Edmonton Fringe Festival, with the festival providing several venues for performing companies. Some companies arrange their own venues, a practice more similar to the Edinburgh Fringe. All venues have paid technicians and volunteer ticket sellers and ushers.

The festival's venues are centred in Winnipeg's historic Exchange District, with the Old Market Square serving as the festival's outdoor hub. However, as the festival has grown, there have also been venues outside that district but still close to Winnipeg's downtown.

The performing companies at the festival are both local and from across Canada and around the world. For example, the 2005 festival featured performers from France, Australia, New Zealand, the UK, and South Africa, as well as across Canada and the United States.

== History ==
The Winnipeg Fringe Theatre Festival was established in 1988 by the Manitoba Theatre Centre, Canada's oldest regional theatre, with Larry Desrochers serving as its first executive producer.

In its first year, ticket sales were 14,000 across nine days of performances. That figure rose to 26,000 in 1989, the festival's second year. It climbed to 44,709 in 1999 and exceeded 60,000 in 2001.

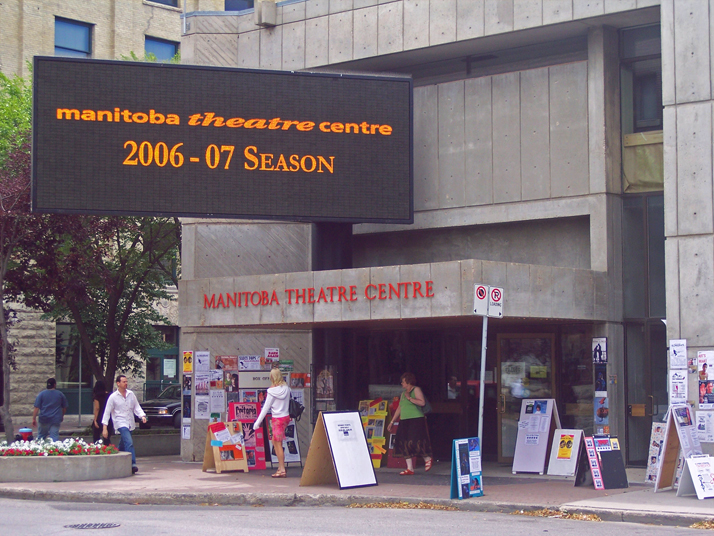
The Manitoba Theatre Centre, 2006. During the Fringe, the front façade of the theatre is covered in hundreds of handbills and posters for various plays.

In 2008, Chuck McEwen, former director of the Toronto Fringe Festival, became executive producer of the festival.

Paid attendance briefly set a record high for North America in 2009 with 81,565 tickets sold, surpassing the previous record of 77,700 set at the 2006 Edmonton Fringe. (However, the Edmonton Fringe festival currently holds the North American record with 104,142 tickets sold in 2011.)

Because of the COVID-19 pandemic, the Royal Manitoba Theatre Centre cancelled the 2020 Winnipeg Fringe Festival. The festival had been scheduled for July 15 to 26. Although RMTC considered postponing it to late summer or fall, they ultimately chose to cancel the in-person event. Instead, the RMTC offered free online programming from July 14 to 17, beginning at 7 PM nightly. The online festival featured local, national, and international programming, including performances from Mike Delamont, Frances Koncan, the Coldhearts, Outside Joke, and Anjali Sandhu. Online festival programming was streamed on YouTube and Facebook.

The festival returned from a two-year hiatus from live performances in 2022.

In 2023, the Fringe introduced a pay-what-you-can model for the five shows presented at the Kids Venue at the Manitoba Theatre for Young People in "an effort to make the festival more affordable for families." That model continued into 2024.

== Annual theme ==
The festival has a different theme each year. Some previous themes have been "the F word" (meaning "fringe") and James Bond.

In 2010, the theme was The Big Top, referring to circuses, with a giant, helium-filled balloon floating above Old Market Square. In 2012, for the 25th anniversary edition of the festival, there was no theme as organizers just "wanted people to get their fringe on." In 2014, the theme was "We like it when you watch."

The theme in 2015 was "We're all <blank> here," where the blank was filled in variously. On the program, it was "mad," but on the website for volunteers, it was "friends."

The theme in 2024 was "Gone Fringin': Venture into Our Neck of the Woods." The 2025 theme was "Choose your own adventure." The theme in 2026 was "Play hard," a video game reference.

== Attendance and ticket revenue ==
revenue	Attendance	Ticket Revenue	Companies
2026	87,832	879,522	160
2019	98,673	879,034	178
2018	103,251	890,624	178
2017	104,908	875,157	186
2016	105,000	--	--
2015	108,706	800,142	181
2014	104,859	761,522	--
2013	101,488	--	--
2012	100,621	686,188	--
2011	87,851	--	--
2010	86,717	--	--

== Harry S. Rintoul Memorial Award ==
The Harry S. Rintoul Memorial Award for Best New Manitoba Play at the Winnipeg Fringe Festival was established by the Manitoba Association of Playwrights to recognize the best play written by a Manitoban and performed at the festival. The award was named in memory of Harry Rintoul, a noted playwright from Winnipeg who died in 2002.

=== List of laureates ===
- 2002: Kevin Klassen, Aftertaste
- 2003: Joseph Aragon, The Unlikely Sainthood of Madeline McKay
- 2004: Daniel Thau-Eleff, Three Ring Circus: Israel, the Palestinians and My Jewish Identity
- 2005: Jason Neufeld, The Rise and Fall of Bloody Redemption
- 2006: Stefanie Wiens, Max and Mirabelle
- 2007: Ross McMillan, The Ingrates
- 2008: Daniel Thau-Eleff, Remember the Night
- 2009: Joseph Aragon, Bloodless: The Trial of Burke and Hare
- 2010: Muriel Hogue, Scar Tissue
- 2011: Jessy Ardern and Ariel Levine, Sigurd the Dragonslayer
- 2012: Scott Douglas, The Touring Test
- 2013: Jessy Ardern and Ariel Levine, The Hound of Ulster
- 2014: Bill Pats, Executing Justice
- 2015: Sydney Hayduk and Justin Otto, Manic Pixie Dream Girl
- 2016: Frances Koncan, zahgidiwin/love
- 2017: Wren Brian, Anomie
- 2018: Walk & Talk Theatre Company, The Ballad of Johnny Boy
- 2019: Connor Joseph, Cuinn Joseph, and Jacob Herd, The Cause
- 2022: Sarah Flynn, Whatever Happens After?
- 2023: Cuinn Joseph, Connor Joseph, and Monique Gauthier, World's Fair 1876: The Centennial Exposition
- 2024: Kinsey Donald, A taste of blood in the mouth
- 2025: Ellen Peterson, The Goose
- 2026: Debbie Patterson, Happy valley

== See also ==
- Canadian Association of Fringe Festivals
- Edmonton International Fringe Festival
- Edinburgh Festival Fringe
- Fringe theatre
