= Audrey Dwyer =

Canadian actor

- Born: Winnipeg, Manitoba
- Education: University of Manitoba
- Writing career
- Notable works: Calpurnia; The D Cut

Audrey Dwyer is a Canadian writer, actor, and director. She is a former associate artistic director of the Royal Manitoba Theatre Centre. She wrote the 2018 comedy, Calpurnia.

== Early life ==
Dwyer was born in Winnipeg, Manitoba. She studied theatre at the University of Manitoba.

== Career ==
In 2011, Dwyer did dramaturgy for and directed Rabiayshna Productions' The Apology. From 2016 to 2017, Dwyer was the artistic director of Cow Over Moon Children's Theatre in Mississauga. She also served as the associate artistic director of both Tarragon Theatre and Nightwood Theatre in Toronto.

Dwyer's play, Calpurnia, premiered in 2018 in Toronto with Nightwood Theatre and Sulong Theatre, under Dwyer's direction. Calpurnia follows a young Jamaican-Canadian writer who is writing a script retelling To Kill A Mockingbird from the perspective of one of the book's minor characters, Calpurnia. The play tackles themes of race, class, and privilege. fu-GEN Theatre selected Calpurnia as one of their top 49 groundbreaking plays by women of colour. Also in 2018, Dwyer developed and performed in One Thing Leads to Another for Young People's Theatre.

In 2019, Dwyer was appointed associate artistic director of the Royal Manitoba Theatre Centre. She previously acted in the RMTC's 2015 production of Vanya and Sonia and Masha and Spike. In 2020, she directed the RMTC's premiere of Frances Koncan's Women of the Fur Trade. The next year, she directed The Mountaintop with RMTC. The production was streamed online to accommodate COVID-19 restrictions. The RMTC is set to put on Dwyer's play Calpurnia in 2022.

Dwyer wrote the 6-episode Crave series, The D Cut, which premiered in 2020. In 2020, Dwyer wrote the libretto for the opera Backstage at Carnegie Hall. Backstage was composed by Tim Brady and was based on Charlie Christian's 1939 Carnegie Hall performance with Benny Goodman's band.

Dwyer's audio-play, Come Home – The Legend Of Daddy Hall, premiered in May 2021 with Tarragon Theatre. Dwyer directed the production which featured the voices of Jesse Clark, Beau Dixon, Starr Domingue, and Jackie Richardson.

== Acting credits ==
=== Television ===
| Year | Title | Role | Notes |
|---|---|---|---|
| 2008–2009 | Da Kink in My Hair | Thea | Episodes: "Forced Ripe Mango" and "Di Heart of Di Matter" |
| 2017–2018 | Baroness Von Sketch Show | Misc. roles | Episodes: "Sometimes It's Good to Be the Shaman" (2018), "Is That You Karen?" (2018), and "Taco and a Hair Flip" (2017) |

=== Theatre ===
| Year | Title | Role | Company | Ref. |
|---|---|---|---|---|
| 2005 | throwing stones | | Clear Light (Toronto Fringe) | |
| 2005 | Blue Planet | Hulda | Young People's Theatre | |
| 2006 | The Babysitter | Babysitter | Theatre Direct Canada/Eldritch | |
| 2008 | Black Medea | Medea | Obsidian Theatre | |
| 2009 | The Tempest | Ariel | Dream in High Park | |
| 2010 | The Overwhelming | Emiritha / Market Woman / Waitress | Studio 180/Canadian Stage | |
| 2012 | thirsty | Julia | National Arts Centre | |
| 2013 | Clybourne Park | Francine / Lena | Studio 180 | |
| 2014 | Good People | Kate | Royal Manitoba Theatre Centre | |
| 2015 | Vanya and Sonia and Masha and Spike | Cassandra | Royal Manitoba Theatre Centre | |
| 2016 | One Thing Leads to Another | Ensemble | Young People's Theatre | |
| 2018 | Theory | Lee | Tarragon Theatre | |

== Directing credits ==
=== Theatre ===
| Year | Title | Company | Ref. |
|---|---|---|---|
| 2011 | The Apology | Rabiayshna Productions | |
| 2011 | The Aftermath | Nightwood Theatre (Grounsdwell Festival) | |
| 2017 | Serenity Wild | Tender Container/SummerWorks | |
| 2018 | Calpurnia | Nightwood Theatre | |
| 2020 | Women of the Fur Trade | Royal Manitoba Theatre Centre | |
| 2021 | The Mountaintop | Royal Manitoba Theatre Centre (online) | |
| 2021 | Come Home – The Legend Of Daddy Hall (audio play) | Tarragon Theatre | |
| 2021 | In Conclusion | Royal Manitoba Theatre Centre (online - Pimootayowin: A Festival of New Work) | |

== Awards ==
| Year | Award | Category | Work | Result | Notes | Ref. |
|---|---|---|---|---|---|---|
| 2011 | Dora Mavor Moore Awards – Independent Theatre Division | Outstanding Direction | The Apology | Nominated | | |
| 2015 | Cayle Chernin Award | Theatre | Calpurnia | Won | | |
| 2016 | Dora Mavor Moore Awards – Theatre for Young Audiences | Outstanding Performance, Ensemble | One Thing Leads to Another | Won | | |
| 2016 | Dora Mavor Moore Awards – Theatre for Young Audiences | Outstanding New Play | One Thing Leads to Another | Won | with Maja Ardal, Julia Tribe, and Mary Francis Moore | |
