= Yolanda Bonnell =

Canadian actress and playwright

- Citizenship: Canada, Fort William First Nation
- Education: Humber College
- Occupations: Actor, playwright
- Notable work: Bug (2018 play)

Yolanda Bonnell is a Canadian actress and playwright. She is most noted for her play Bug, which was a Governor General's Award nominee for English-language drama at the 2020 Governor General's Awards.

== Personal life ==
Bonnell is an Anishinaabe member of the Fort William First Nation near Thunder Bay, Ontario, and a graduate of Humber College's theatre school. She had her first significant acting role in a 2016 production of Judith Thompson's play The Crackwalker.

Bonnell identifies as queer and two-spirit.

== Career ==
Her subsequent roles included a 2018 production of Kim Senklip Harvey's Kamloopa: An Indigenous Matriarch Story, and a 2019 production of Marie Clements's The Unnatural and Accidental Women. In 2022, Bonnell premiered White Girls in Moccasins at Buddies in Bad Times Theatre and My Sister's Rage at Tarragon Theatre. My Sister's Rage was also published in the 2024 collection Staging Coyote's Dream Vol. 3, edited by Monique Mojica and Lindsay Lachance.

Her play Bug was staged at various theatre festivals, including the annual Rhubarb Festival at Buddies in Bad Times, beginning in 2015, and was nominated for a Dora Mavor Moore Award for Outstanding New Play in 2019. It received its most widespread attention in early 2020, when a production by Theatre Passe Muraille saw Bonnell make a public request that the play be reviewed only by BIPOC theatre critics. Bonnell explained her request by noting that she had previously received racist reviews for her work, including from a critic who asserted that it was fit only to be seen on Indian reserves, and stated that "In Toronto, critics are mostly white and male. They come at Indigenous art with a different lens – that often comes back to 'If I don't understand it, that means it's not good or it's not a valid form of theatre'. I don't mind being critiqued. But at least let it come from a place of knowledge, of understanding what you're talking about."
