= Gillian Hanna =

Irish actress (1944–2019)

- Born: 20 June 1944; Buxton, Derbyshire, England
- Died: 18 August 2019 (aged 75); London, England
- Occupation: Actress
- Years active: 1971—2019

Gillian Hanna (20 June 1944 – 18 August 2019) was an Irish stage, film, TV and voice actress. She was a founder member of The Project Arts Centre. She founded the feminist Monstrous Regiment Theatre Company, about which she wrote a book published in 1991.

== Early life ==
Hanna graduated with a First Class degree in Modern Languages from Trinity College, Dublin. She went on to work as an actor as well as a translator. In the latter role, she provided the original translation for Gavin Richards' adaptation of the Dario Fo play Accidental Death of an Anarchist, which was a major success for the Belt and Braces Roadshow Company in 1979–81.

== Career ==
In 1975, Hanna founded the feminist Monstrous Regiment Theatre Company, remaining with the company for 15 years. In 1981, she starred in Honor Moore's Mourning Pictures at the Tricycle Theatre, a Monstrous Regiment production with original music by Tony Haynes. The play was broadcast on BBC Radio 4 in May 1982.

She later published a book about the company, Monstrous Regiment: A Collective Celebration. An essay of hers, 'An Age Of Innocence', was published in the collection Trinity Tales: Trinity College in the Sixties.

Hanna had extensive credits on stage as well as on TV and film. Among these, she played the fragile typist teacher Mrs Gossage in the sixth series of Grange Hill (1983), as well as Brenna Jordache in the infamous 'body under the patio' storyline of the Channel 4 soap Brookside (1993–95).

== Books ==
- Monstrous Regiment: A Collective Celebration, London: Nick Hern Books, (1991)
- Feminism and Theatre: Gillian Hanna, Department of Theatre, Dartington College of Arts, 1978

== Partial filmography ==
- Full House (1973, TV Series) - Actress in Plugged Into History
- Grange Hill (1983, TV Series) - Mrs. Gossage
- Brookside (1983, 1993–95, TV Series) - Brenna Jordache / Mrs. Brown
- The Fear (1988, TV Series) - Mrs. Broderick
- All Creatures Great and Small (1988, TV Series) - Betty Sanders
- The Wolves of Willoughby Chase (1989) - Mrs. Shubunkin
- Making News (1990, TV Series) - Mrs. Gurney
- EastEnders (1991, TV Series) - Mrs. Desmond
- All Good Things (1991, TV Series) - Mrs. Grant
- The House of Bernarda Alba (1991, TV Movie) - Maid
- Poirot (1993, TV Series) - Margaret Baker
- The Marshal (1993) - Maria Pia
- 15: The Life and Death of Philip Knight (1995, TV Movie) - Margareth Knight
- Desmond's (1993, TV Series) - Pamela
- Screenplay (1993, TV Series) - Eileen
- Drop the Dead Donkey (1994, TV Series) - Mrs. Babcock
- Casualty (1995-2007, TV Series) - Sal Rhodes / Mrs. Mohan
- The Heart Surgeon (1997, TV Movie) - Margot
- Dangerfield (1997, TV Series) - Julie Hanson
- Les Misérables (1998, directed by Bille August) - Mme. Thénardier
- All the Queen's Men (2001, directed by Stefan Ruzowitzky) - Nettie
- Weirdsister College (2001, TV Series) - Josie Foster
- The Heart of Me (2002, directed by Thaddeus O'Sullivan) - Betty / Maid
- Oliver Twist (2005, directed by Roman Polanski) - Mrs. Sowerberry
- Doctors (2006, TV Series) - Pat Bishop
- The Kindness of Strangers (2006, TV Movie, directed by Tony Smith) - Hannah
- Mist: The Tale of a Sheepdog Puppy (2006, TV Movie) - Swift
- Mist: Sheepdog Tales (2007–09, TV Series) - Swift / Queenie Creamer / MacPhereson Sister
- Inspector George Gently (2008, TV Movie) - Mabs Hardyment
- Mr. Nice (2010, directed by Bernard Rose) - Irish Phone Operator
- Married Single Other (2010, TV Series) - Mrs. Kelly
- Strike Back (2011, TV Series) - Joanna Heath
- National Theatre Live: Treasure Island (2015, directed by Polly Findlay) - Grandma
- The Amazing World of Gumball (2015–19, TV Series) - Betty McArthur (Season 4–6)
- Genius (2016, directed by Michael Grandage) - Julia Wolfe
- Ethel & Ernest (2016, directed by Roger Mainwood) - Midwife / Aunty Flo (voice)
