= Frances Koncan =

Canadian journalist and playwright

- Born: 1986; Couchiching First Nation
- Education: University of Manitoba (BA), Brooklyn College (MFA)
- Occupations: Playwright, director, journalist
- Notable work: Women of the Fur Trade; Zahgidiwin/love

Frances Koncan (born 1986) is an Saulteaux-Slovene journalist, theatre director, and playwright from Couchiching First Nation who lives in Winnipeg, Manitoba. As of 2023, Koncan uses she/they pronouns.

== Early life and education ==
Koncan was born in May 1986 in Couchiching First Nation.

She has a bachelor's degree in psychology from the University of Manitoba and a master's degree in fine arts in playwriting from Brooklyn College of the City University of New York.

== Career ==
Koncan is currently an assistant professor at the School of Creative Writing at the University of British Columbia.

She wrote the play Women of the Fur Trade, zahgidiwin/love, Flesh-Coloured Crayons, and Space Girl.

Koncan has also worked as assistant director on Seminar (for the Royal Manitoba Theatre Centre/Mirvish Productions), The Humans, and A Doll's House, Part 2 (RMTC), and Stripped Down Anthony & Cleopatra (Shakespeare in the Ruins) and co-director with Angelica Schwartz on an Andy Warhol inspired production of The Hollow (for the Royal Manitoba Theatre Centre's Master Playwright Festival).

In addition, Koncan worked as an arts reporter for the Winnipeg Free Press from 2019 to 2022. She was the artistic director of Sarasvati Productions from 2020 to 2021. They obtained the writer-in-residence position at the Winnipeg Public Library from 2022 to 2023. They are currently an assistant professor at the University of British Columbia in the School of Creative Writing teaching playwriting.

== Awards and honours ==
Koncan's theatrical work has won the REVEAL Indigenous Arts Award, the Winnipeg Arts Council's 2017 RBC On the Rise Award, and got her shortlisted for the Tarragon Emerging Playwrights Award. Her play The Dance-off of Conscious Uncoupling received the 2015 Tom Hendry Award for Best New Comedy.

== Works ==
=== Television ===
- That’s AWSM!

=== Theatre ===
- Trendsettlers
- Women of the Fur Trade
- Riot Resist Revolt Repeat
- zahgidiwin/love (2016 Harry Rintoul Award winner)
- How to Talk to Human Beings
- The Dance-off of Conscious Uncoupling (2015 Tom Hendry Award for Best New Comedy)
- Little Red
- Flesh-Coloured Crayons
- Space Girl

=== Film ===
- Outdigenous
