= Maureen May =

American cellist and conductor (born 1962)

- Born: Maureen Getting; September 22, 1962 (age 63)
- Origin: United States
- Genres: Classical
- Occupations: Conductor, Cellist
- Instrument: Cello
- Website: www.maysymphony.org

Maureen May (born September 22, 1962) is an American cellist and conductor. She resides in the Orlando, Florida, area and is a noted cellist in the region and co-founder and artistic director of the Metropolitan Area Youth Symphony.

== Early life ==
May was born in Sanborn, Iowa. May's parents are Daryle and Marian Getting. May is the youngest of six children.

== Education ==
As a young student, May studied cello with Mary Eleanor May, whose son Jonathan May was also a cellist in a musical household.

May moved to Colorado, where she graduated with a degree in Cello Performance from Colorado State University.

== Career ==
In Colorado, the May and her husband founded the Canyon Youth Orchestra and adopted a lifelong philosophy of community involvement through music.

After 1988, May moved to Tennessee, where she started the Cumberland String Project—the program introduced strings and music education to an area that otherwise had no music education in the schools or community.

In the early 1990s, May moved to Central Florida, where she continued to teach strings, help her husband expand his burgeoning youth orchestras, and gave birth to two more children. As an accomplished cellist, May quickly joined the Orlando Philharmonic Orchestra and the Bach Festival Orchestra. May was the orchestra director at Maitland Middle School and Winter Park High School, and also started the strings program at Park Maitland School. Despite a terrible car accident that threatened her career as a cellist and music teacher, she would also teach music at Millennium Middle School in Sanford, Florida, and build a comprehensive strings program with Jonathan at Trinity Preparatory School, where she has worked for the last 10 years. She also performs with her own chamber group the Dolce Chamber Players and is a frequent performer at area events, including Walt Disney World's Candlelight Processional. She has also performed in accompanying orchestras with many notable pop musicians such as Jimmy Page, Harry Connick Jr., Donny Osmond, Smokey Robinson, as well as famous tenors Luciano Pavarotti and Andrea Bocelli.

In 2010, after May's husband died, she continued to teach and play professionally, and assumed a leadership role in some of the programs that she helped create with Jonathan, including the strings program at Trinity Prep. May has also been instrumental in paying tribute to her husband, and has participated in several tributes performed by Central Florida orchestras. The first number of the OPO's November, 2010 "Myth and Poetry" program was dedicated to Jonathan May; Maureen played cello during the program. Upon completion of The Phoenix Rising, a Stella Sung piece commissioned years earlier by Jonathan, Orlando Phil maestro Christopher Wilkins walked into the orchestra and gave Maureen a warm embrace.

May is now in her second term as a Musician Board Member of the Orlando Philharmonic Board of Directors and serves as Chair of the Musician Board on the Philharmonic's Executive Board. She also has maintained a private studio for over twenty-five years.

=== Metropolitan Area Youth Symphony ===
After Jonathan May's passing in February, 2010, in addition to her own professional obligations May assumed some of the duties her late husband. Along with longtime family friend, colleague, and fellow conductor, Michael Miller, they comprised the artistic staff of the Florida Young Artists Orchestra and shared duties as co-Artistic Directors. The orchestra was founded by Jonathan after he left his position as Artistic Director of the Florida Symphony Youth Orchestra in 1998, and Maureen helped him form the new orchestra out of their living room, along with help of other parents, music teachers, and young musicians. Though the Orlando area already possessed one youth orchestra, Jonathan explained to the Orlando Sentinel about the need to form a new one: "What this is is a difference of philosophy. One is a strong musical director with a supporting board; the other is a weak musical director and a strong board calling the shots." In what would become a foundation of their educational philosophy, the Mays insisted on strong musical direction in all their programs.

After participating in the final concerts for the FYAO in 2010, both artistic directors left the orchestra. As Maureen later explained to Trinity Voice, the orchestra abandoned the vision of her husband and sought to create a strong board with weak musical directors: "Jonathan May trusted for years in multiple orchestras. Like the FSYO before it, the FYAO had Mr. May's influence; but neither orchestra retained his vision or spirit."

In 2010, under the executive direction of her daughter and fellow music teacher, Emily May, Maureen May and Michael Miller of The Geneva School in Winter Park, formed the Metropolitan Area Youth Symphony in honor of Jonathan May. With Maureen May and Michael Miller serving as Artistic Directors, the MAYS set out to continue Jonathan May's inclusive music educational philosophy, and states on its website: "The MAYS is dedicated to his honor and maintaining the high musical, educational, and ethical ideals that he brought with him to each of his orchestras and students.

The founding of the MAYS occurred on May 1st, 2010, which was designated by the government of Orange County, Florida, as Mr. Jonathan May Day. The first Mr. Jonathan May Day celebration was held at Trinity Preparatory School on May 1, 2010, with the proclamation read live to the crowd by District Five Orange County Commissioner Bill Segal and presented to Maureen. The MAYS celebrated Mr. May Day 2011 with its inaugural season finale concert that attracted hundreds and featured the world Premiere of Robert Kerr's "Elegy," dedicated to Susan Goldman and inspired by Jonathan May, on which Maureen May played solo cello.

On May 14, 2011, Maureen and her children, as well as students of the MAYS and other area youth orchestras joined onstage the Orlando Philharmonic Orchestra as they honored Jonathan May at its sellout final concert featuring violinist Joshua Bell. The world premiere performance of the piece, Tall and Small, a commissioned work by Jonathan's brother, Daniel May, is named to reflect the wide impact May's passion for music had on children and adults alike. The Make Music-Make History competition featured hundreds of students submitting YouTube auditions, with live audition recordings conducted by the MAYS. Seated at the front of the orchestra in front of the sellout audience, Maureen played the piece's cello solo on Jonathan's cello, with the music culminating in a resolution that the Orlando Sentinel described as "that moment when the sun emerges after a long stretch of rain."

The MAYS is in its fifth season and continues to grow. Maureen May explains its success as being a combination of her husband's philosophy and the community of Central Florida: "My goal with starting [MAYS] was just to make sure that his educational approach was furthered. My main goal is to include people from all around Florida…The overwhelming support the MAYS has received from the community, including musicians and teachers, parents and students, has confirmed to us that there is not only room for three orchestras in the area, but a need for such diversity."

In 2012, 501(c)(3) organization, The Jonathan May Foundation, was founded to support the students of the MAYS and further Jonathan May's educational ideals. May has a permanent seat on the Board of Directors.

== Personal life ==
In 1983, May married Jonathan May, also a cellist. They have four children, Emily (b.1987), Elliot (b.1988), Allison (b.1990), and Nathan (b.1994). On February 27, 2010, May's husband died at 51 years old.
