= Metropolitan Area Youth Symphony =

American youth orchestra

The Metropolitan Area Youth Symphony (MAYS) is a youth orchestra in the Central Florida region founded in honor of conductor and cellist, Jonathan May. The MAYS is led by Artistic Directors Maureen May and Michael Miller and features eight orchestral groups spanning beginner, intermediate and advanced skill levels, as well as several in-school string orchestra programs. In 2015, MAYS added Dr. Chung Park, Director of Orchestras and String Music Education at the University of Central Florida, to the artistic staff as conductor of the symphony. The MAYS currently rehearses at St. Alban's Anglican Church in Oviedo, Florida and Lake-Sumter State College in Leesburg, Florida.

== History ==
The founding of the MAYS took place on May 1, 2010, which was designated by the government of Orange County, Florida as Mr. Jonathan May Day. The first Mr. Jonathan May Day celebration was held at Trinity Preparatory School on May 1, 2010, with the proclamation read live to the crowd by District Five Orange County Commissioner Bill Segal and presented to Maureen. The MAYS was founded to further the artistic and educational vision of Jonathan May. Since 1984, May followed his dream of bringing a well-rounded music education to thousands of young students of the Central Florida community. After his death in February 2010, the MAYS was formed under the executive direction of his daughter, Emily May, and artistic direction of his wife, Maureen May, a former music director at Millennium Middle School, strings teacher at Trinity Preparatory School, and cellist in the Orlando Philharmonic Orchestra and the Bach Festival, and close friend and colleague, Michael Miller, Director of Music Activities at The Geneva School, artistic director of the Central Florida Youth Orchestra, and former associate conductor of the Florida Young Artists Orchestra from 2000 to 2010.

The MAYS set out to continue Jonathan May's inclusive music educational philosophy, and states about him on the orchestra website: "The MAYS is dedicated to his honor and maintaining the high musical, educational, and ethical ideals that he brought with him to each of his orchestras and students.

During its first season, the MAYS held concerts at Knowles Memorial Chapel on the campus of Rollins College, First Presbyterian Church of Orlando, the Cathedral Church of Saint Luke, and collaborated with the Geneva School Rhetoric Choir, the Cathedral Choir, the Orlando Deanery Boy choir and Girls Choir, and Lake Howell High School's band and chorus as part of their Masterworks Series. The MAYS celebrated Jonathan May Day 2011 with its inaugural season finale concert that attracted hundreds and featured the world Premiere of Robert Kerr's "Elegy," dedicated to Susan Goldman and inspired by Jonathan May.

On May 14, 2011, many students of the MAYS joined onstage the Orlando Philharmonic Orchestra as they honored Jonathan May at its sellout final concert featuring violinist Joshua Bell. The world premiere performance of the piece, Tall and Small, a commissioned work by Jonathan's brother, Daniel May, is named to reflect the wide impact May's passion for music had on children and adults alike.

After the conclusion of its second season, the MAYS absorbed the Central Florida Youth Orchestra in Leesburg. It also began an in-school strings program called MAYS At Your School, which provides classroom instruction to students at schools in Eatonville, Florida, Mount Dora, Florida, and Leesburg, Florida. The season concluded at the Bob Carr Performing Arts Centre in Orlando with all students performing at MAYSfest, adopted from CFYO's "Mayfest" concert to honor Jonathan May. MAYSfest featured all MAYS students performing together onstage for the world premiere performance of "Mondo Rondo," a piece written by Daniel May for the MAYS. MAYSfest has become an annual event for the MAYS, usually taking place around Jonathan May Day. The 2012–2013 season also saw the formation of the 501(c)(3) organization, The Jonathan May Foundation, which was founded to support the students of the MAYS and further Jonathan May's educational ideals.

The MAYS currently has an enrollment of 250 students in nine Central Florida counties and celebrates it fifth season in 2014–2015.
