= Jonathan May =

American cellist and conductor (1958–2010)

- Jonathan May conducting at Carnegie Hall

Background information
- Born: Jonathan Paul May; October 9, 1958; Eau Claire, Wisconsin
- Origin: United States
- Died: February 27, 2010 (aged 51) Winter Park, Florida
- Genre: Classical
- Occupations: Conductor, Cellist
- Instrument: Cello

Jonathan May (October 9, 1958 – February 27, 2010) was an American cellist and conductor. He resided in the Orlando, Florida area and was noted for founding and directing numerous youth orchestras and music programs throughout the region.

== Early life ==
One of seven children, May was born in Eau Claire, Wisconsin to Walter and Eleanor May, each an accomplished musician and teacher. At the age of four, the family moved to Fairport, New York where Jonathan would learn to play the cello at a young age. He was a student of Lynn Richmond and played in the Rochester Youth Symphony. When Jonathan was in high school, the family moved, to Sioux Falls, South Dakota. He earned a bachelor's degree at Augustana College in Sioux Falls, where his father was chairman of the music department. During this time, he met his future wife, Maureen Getting, also an accomplished cellist and student of his mother. Jonathan received his master's degree at Colorado State University in Fort Collins, where he and Maureen would begin a lifelong pursuit of teaching music that would take them across the country.

== Career ==
The May family moved to Central Florida in the early 1990s, where Jonathan would join the faculty of Stetson University in DeLand. As his reputation as a music teacher in the region grew, he was made Artistic Director of the Florida Symphony Youth Orchestra in 1994. When May assumed artistic control of the 90-piece youth orchestra, it consisted of two orchestras of students representing 45 schools from eight counties in Central Florida; just three years later the orchestra grew to over 200 students and four divisions ranging from beginner to a top-level symphony. In 1997, he would lead the orchestra on a tour of Australia, which culminated in a performance at the Sidney Opera House. The same year May would also help form and lead the Daytona Beach Youth Orchestra at Daytona Beach Community College, where he was also a professor.

May would continue successfully leading the FSYO until 1998, when a split occurred among orchestra board members over the artistic direction of the orchestra. May was reportedly forced out of critical artistic choices by FSYO board members who sought to widen their artistic direction and exclude him from the orchestra's audition process. As May would explain to the Orlando Sentinel: "What this is is a difference of philosophy. One is a strong musical director with a supporting board; the other is a weak musical director and a strong board calling the shots." Not content with assuming the role of a weak musical director, May would form a competing orchestra with former FSYO board members and supporters. Though this period marked a fractious time for the youth orchestra movement in Central Florida, with some patrons claiming there were not enough students, venues, or funding to support another youth orchestra in the Orlando area, May remained undaunted and would answer these concerns with his familiar humor and a prophetic movie quote: "If you build it, they will come."

May founded the Florida Young Artists Orchestra in 1998 in Orlando. May's leadership helped oversee its growth into five separate orchestras composed of about 200 students (ages 6–22) from several Central Florida counties. He was also the founder and director of the strings program at Park Maitland School in Maitland, Florida and Trinity Preparatory School in Winter Park, Florida, where he was also the composition teacher.

What began as a strings program started by May in 1994 would become the Central Florida Youth Orchestra in 2001, which met at Lake-Sumter Community College in Leesburg; May served as Artistic Director and Principal Conductor of the group of young musicians aged 6–19 spanning beginner, intermediate, and advanced ability. In just a few years the orchestra would grow to five groups and increasingly become known for its inclusiveness, as no student was denied the opportunity to learn music, as well as May's relentless efforts to raise awareness about the value of an orchestral education to children of the Central Florida community.

As dedicated member of the Central Florida community, May devoted a great deal of his time bringing music to those that might not otherwise have the opportunity. Like he did in Lake County, May would form an orchestral program in Flagler County where none had existed previously. Beginning in 2001 as a small strings program of a dozen musicians known as the Flagler Symphonic Society, with the help of Flagler County school system the program grew in 2005 into the Flagler Youth Orchestra of Palm Coast, Florida. May served as Artistic Director of the after-school music-education program, which was available free of charge to all Flagler County public, private and home-schooled students. May would lead 125 students in the first year and the program would quickly grow to become the largest performing arts program in Flagler County, with routine enrollment of 300 or more students every year. May's reputation for inclusiveness and excellence in music education would continue to grow each year and with each new orchestra and music program he founded.

Under his guidance, and as part of his desire to provide students with the most comprehensive orchestra experience, May's orchestras often performed with professional guest soloists and in venues across the globe, including in Australia, England, Scotland, throughout Austria, in major Italian venues in Milan, Fiesole, and at the Academy of Music at Santa Cecelia. May also worked with professional orchestras in Colorado, Minnesota, Tennessee, and Florida and returned to Prague as guest conductor of that city's Symphony Orchestra.

On Sunday, June 15, 2008 (Father's Day), May would take 110 student musicians from all his orchestras to perform on the most revered stage in music, the Isaac Stern Auditorium / Ronald O. Perelman Stage of Carnegie Hall in New York City, as part of the venue's Ensemble Spotlight Series. Members from the Central Florida Youth Orchestra, Daytona Beach Youth Orchestra, Flagler Youth Orchestra, and Florida Young Artists Orchestra would combine to form the Florida Festival Youth Orchestra. May appeared with the orchestra on the CBS Early Show and the trip culminated with orchestra performing before a large, enthusiastic crowd in Carnegie Hall. May conducted the orchestra as they performed three works commissioned especially for the event: The Phoenix Rising by Stella Sung, Alligator Songs by May's brother, composer Daniel May, and The Ponce De Leon Suite by Robert Kerr. The orchestra would receive several standing ovations throughout the program. Always conscious of the difficulties of funding the arts but never doubting the need to do so, May and his orchestras sought to raise money for their trip by doing what they did best and holding performances for the community, as he told the press: "Selling cookies is not what we do. If people wonder why this is a worthy cause, they can come and listen."

On February 26, 2010 Jonathan Paul May suffered a sudden brain bleed and died at 2:45pm the next afternoon, February 27, 2010, age 51. His public memorial at Northland Church in Longwood, Florida was attended by over 1,700 admirers, friends, students and colleagues. He had four children, Emily (b. 1987), Elliot (b. 1988), Allison (b. 1990), and Nathan (b. 1994), and was married to Maureen May, a cellist with the Orlando Philharmonic Orchestra, the Bach Festival, as well as a teacher of strings at Millennium Middle School and Trinity Preparatory School. The last piece May ever conducted was Dona nobis pacem (Grant Us Peace) with the students at Park Maitland.

== Legacy ==
During May's quarter century as a music professional and teacher, he worked with orchestras all over the world as both a musician and conductor. May was the Artistic Director of the Academy of Music at Schloss-Ort, Gmunden, Upper Austria, where he performed as cellist and conductor. He was also recognized by his peers and several organizations for his superior work, including winning the Teachers Who Make a Difference Award, and an ASCAP award at the American Symphony Orchestra League's annual conference. In addition to his orchestras and programs, May maintained a private studio and all told taught well over 1,000 students each week.

Known to his students and colleagues as a magnetic personality who was always quick with a joke or bad pun, his passion for educating students of music was infectious. Referred to as "the Johnny Appleseed of music" by his brother, composer Daniel May, he sought to create musical opportunities for students wherever he saw an opening. May would not only create a large number of youth orchestras and music programs in Florida, but would also inspire other musicians and music teachers to do the same, leading directly to the creation of orchestras all over the country.

In the often-political world of youth orchestras, he retained an insouciance and positive attitude that allowed him to focus on the music education of his students over politics or status. May was well known for a motto, often used as a mantra to help educate his students about dealing with musical changes: "You must…" he would say. "Adjust!" they would respond. As with all of May's musical lessons, these words would apply as much to life as to music.

== Tributes ==
Since May's death, many Central Florida concerts and performances have been dedicated to his honor. The Central Florida Youth Orchestra, the Flagler Youth Orchestra, and the Trinity Prep Theater Department all dedicated performances to May. The Orlando Philharmonic Orchestra (OPO) also dedicated the first number of its "Myth and Poetry" program on November 1, 2010 to May; The Phoenix Rising, composed by May's friend and OPO's composer-in-residence Stella Sung, was originally commissioned by May for his youth orchestra. Upon completion of the emotional piece, OPO conductor Christopher Wilkins embraced Maureen May, who plays cello in the orchestra. Additional tributes to May have been planned by the CFYO, the FYO, and the Metropolitan Area Youth Symphony.

May 1st has been designated by the government of Orange County, Florida as Mr. Jonathan May Day. The first celebration was held May 1, 2010 at Trinity Preparatory School in Winter Park, Florida, and events are planned annually in Central Florida to honor and celebrate May's love and lifelong commitment to music education.

On May 14, 2011, the Orlando Philharmonic Orchestra honored May at its concert featuring violinist Joshua Bell with the world premiere performance of a commissioned work by May's brother, Daniel. The piece, Tall and Small, was named to reflect the wide impact May's passion for music had on children and adults alike. The professional OPO musicians were joined onstage by 30–35 student musicians of all skill levels that worked with or were inspired by May. The Make Music-Make History competition continued through April 1, 2011 with live audition recordings conducted by the Metropolitan Area Youth Symphony in March. The sold-out concert began with "The Tall and the Small," a 12-minute piece that the Orlando Sentinel reviewed as "reminiscent of that moment when the sun emerges after a long stretch of rain." The OPO was accompanied by a 36-member youth ensemble that featured two of May's children, as well as his wife, Maureen, who was seated in front of the orchestra and played an emotional cello solo on Jonathan's cello.

In 2012, tributes to Jonathan May continued to be made throughout Central Florida. The CFYO renamed its annual season finale concert "MAYFEST" to serve as a tribute to its former leader. After honoring May's memory in 2011 with a February 28 performance at the cold-weather shelter at First United Methodist Church in Bunnell, Florida, the Flagler Youth Orchestra honored May's memory in 2012 with a day-long tour of assisted and independent living facilities in Palm Coast on the weekend before Jonathan May Day.

== The Jonathan May Foundation and MAYS ==
In 2010, May was named as honorary founder of the Metropolitan Area Youth Symphony (MAYS) in the Orlando area, founded by his wife, Maureen, and longtime friend, colleague, and fellow conductor, Michael Miller of The Geneva School in Winter Park, with his daughter Emily serving as program organizer. The MAYS sets out to continue May's inclusive music educational philosophy, and states about him on the orchestra website: "The MAYS is dedicated to his honor and maintaining the high musical, educational, and ethical ideals that he brought with him to each of his orchestras and students.

The Jonathan May Foundation was formed in 2012 to encourage participation in youth orchestra by providing scholarships and assistance to MAYS and the students in all of its orchestras and programs. The nonprofit foundation sponsors free MAYS concerts throughout the season, as well as the season finale MAYSfest, which features all the students from each MAYS orchestra and program.
