= Minnesota Fringe Festival =

Performing arts festival in Minnesota

Coordinates: 44.9704°N 93.2424°W

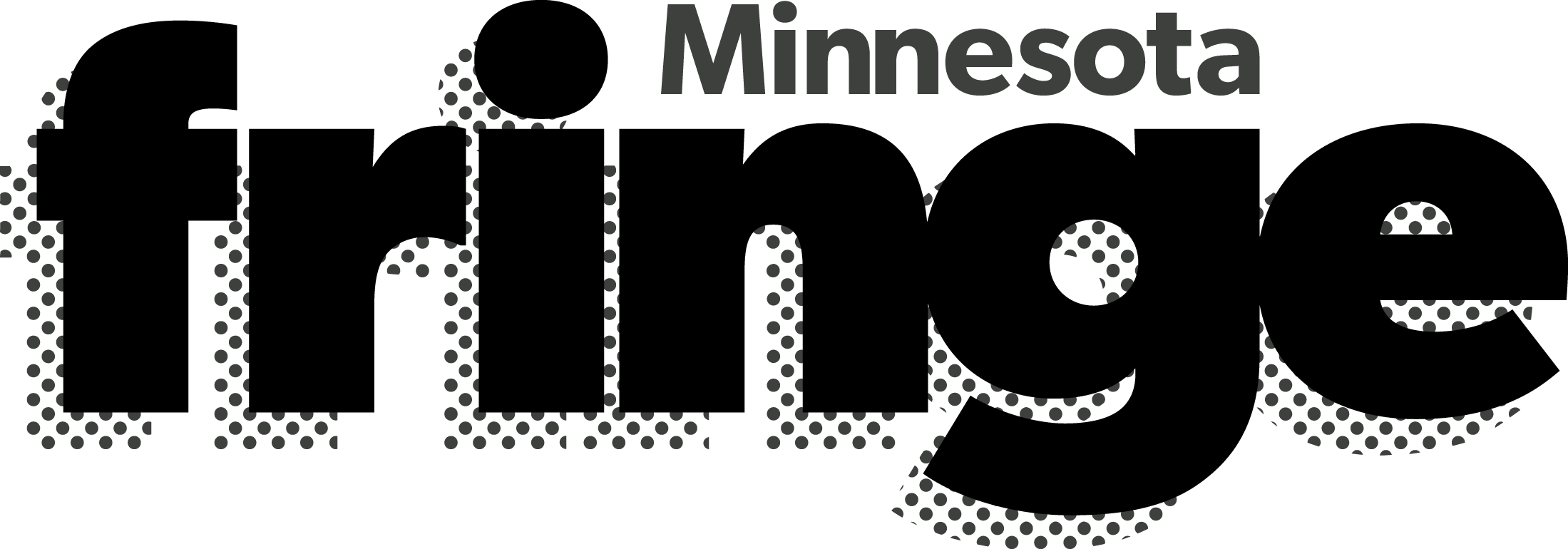
- Current Fringe logo
- Location: Minneapolis, Minnesota
- Founded: 1994
- Founded by: Bob McFadden
- Artistic director: Dawn Bentley
- Selector: Unjuried
- Type of plays: Comedy, drama, dance, musical, something different
- Festival date: August 6–16, 2026 (varies by year, see here for all past dates)
- Website: minnesotafringe.org

The Minnesota Fringe Festival is a performing arts festival held in Minneapolis, Minnesota, United States, every summer, usually during the first two weeks in August. The eleven-day event, which features performing artists of many genres and disciplines, is one of many Fringe Festivals in North America. Minnesota Fringe is the largest nonjuried festival in the United States and the third-largest Fringe festival in North America. In 2013, Minnesota Fringe ran August 1–11 and featured 176 shows with a total of 895 performances in multiple venues around the city and distributed 50,007 tickets over the eleven-day event. In 2007, attendance and box office revenue were adversely affected by the collapse of the I-35W bridge the day before the festival opened.

Fringe shows are 60 minutes or less and appear in an official venue supplied by the festival for five performances stretched out over the festival's eleven days. Venues vary widely, with capacities ranging from 55 to over 400, and available configurations include black-box, proscenium, thrust or arena stages. Past venues include Minneapolis Theatre Garage, HUGE Improv Theater, Mixed Blood Theatre mainstage, Theatre de la Jeune Lune's side stage and the four stages at the University of Minnesota's Rarig Center. Normally, eleven shows will share a venue.

Performing companies that participate in the Fringe split a share of the ticket revenues with the festival and pay an application fee. Currently, the artists' share is 65 percent of the box office revenue.

The festival has been run by executive director Dawn Bentley, who assumed this position on April 3, 2017, after former executive director Jeff D. Larson stepped down in October 2016.

Minnesota Fringe Festival is a founding member of United States Association of Fringe Festivals (USAFF).

== History ==
The Minnesota Fringe Festival was created as part of a trend of fringe festival establishments in the United States. The country's first fringe was the Seattle Fringe Festival, founded in 1991, followed by the Orlando International Fringe Theater Festival and the San Francisco Fringe Festival in 1992 and 1993, respectively. Founded by Bob McFadden and operating with a budget of around $35,000, the Minnesota Fringe Festival first ran from June 23–July 2, 1994, in several theaters around the West Bank neighborhood of Minneapolis. In spite of the festival's name, the Minnesota Fringe did not serve as the fringe festival to any larger, more mainstream theater event. The first annual Fringe was described by Mark Pizzato as "quickly organized and underpublicized", with low attendance reported at its 53 shows, each of which cost six dollars or less and ran under 90 minutes. It drew 4,600 theatergoers and featured shows from companies hailing from three continents (North America, Asia, and Europe).

The festival's growth was modest in its first several years. In 1997, following the previous year's festival which had seen the lowest attendance of any Fringe to date, the event moved to the Loring Park neighborhood. That year marked an attendance of 4,300, after which point Dean Seal replaced McFadden as the festival's executive director. In 1998, the festival began offering patrons multi-show passes and attendance increased to 6,573. The following year, the festival's attendance more than doubled, owing, according to Fringe officials, to better marketing and the 68 shows at that years festival, an increase from previous years. In 2000, the Fringe won a $10,000 grant from the McKnight Foundation and once more expanded, to 80 shows. Festival operations, with a working budget of $260,000, were run out of an office space above the Acadia Cabaret Cafe in Minneapolis, and the festival had begun attracting a variety of sponsors. While in its earlier years, acts had been selected by invitation, by the new millennium the festival was operating on an unjuried first-come, first-served model. The 2001 festival marked the first year that Fringe organizers had to turn away applicants, with the number of shows capped at 120. The festival had also expanded into screening films and showcasing visual art as part of the Visual Fringe.

Seal, the only full-time Fringe employee, resigned as the festival's executive director in 2001 and was replaced by Leah Cooper, who had for the previous three years served as president of the organization's board. Early in her tenure, Cooper hired a full-time volunteer coordinator, a director for Visual Fringe, and a part-time office manager. The 2002 festival was the first in a number of years to employ venues outside of Loring Park, expanding the festival's footprint to the Uptown district. By this point, the Minnesota Fringe was the United States's largest fringe festival. In the following years, the festival's most popular shows saw increased attendance, including record numbers of sold-out houses, as well as reprises and remounts at other venues, while mean attendance decreased, indicating decreased attendance at smaller shows. Cooper in 2004 announced plans to exit the Fringe after the 2005 festival, but stayed on an additional year to help solve fundraising issues that arose. In 2006, the festival began using venues in the West Bank neighborhood again.

Robin Gillette replaced Cooper as executive director for the 2007 festival. On August 1 of that year, the I-35W Mississippi River bridge collapsed. That year's iteration of the festival was scheduled to begin the next day and the bridge would have connected patrons to neighborhoods in which performances were to take place. As a result of the bridge's collapse, attendance to the festival was 17% lower than the year before, the lowest since 2002. The 2008 festival saw an increase in the number of dance shows presented as well as a partial recovery in the number of tickets sold and by 2009, the festival set an all-time attendance record of more than 46,000.

Jeff Larson, who first worked administratively with the Fringe as its technical director, then associate director, became executive director in 2013. He left the position in 2016.

In April 2020, the festival's executive director, Dawn Bentley, announced the cancellation of the 2020 edition of the festival due to the ongoing coronavirus pandemic. The organization's four staffmembers were furloughed as it began to refund $40,000 in deposits from artists and projected an additional loss of $160,000 in festival income.

== Features of the Minnesota Fringe ==
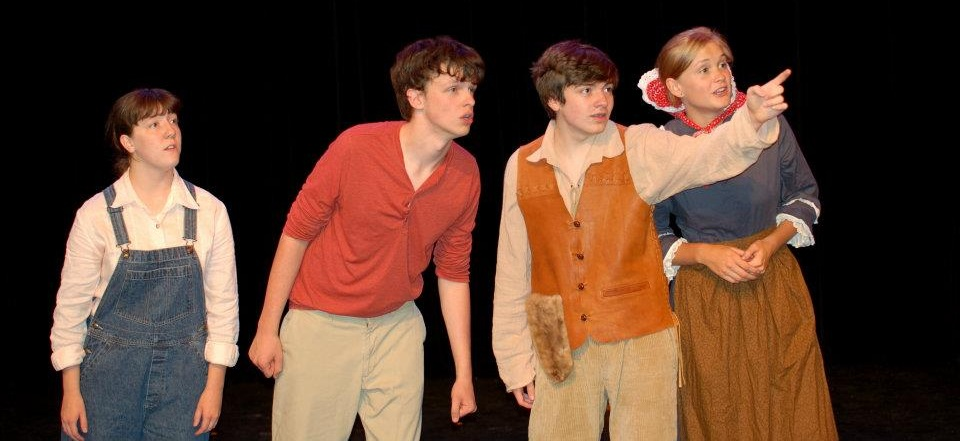
The Donner Party Kidz!, a show from the 2012 Festival

=== Nonjuried entry ===
Minnesota Fringe Festival is nonjuried; that is, the performers and shows are not vetted by a panel of judges ahead of time. Companies that wish to perform submit applications and are drawn by lottery, a practice that replaced the festival's former method of "first come, first served" in 2004.

=== Performance categories ===
The festival is open to all performing artists. Show genres typically include comedy (scripted and improv), drama, dance (classical, modern and ethnic), puppetry, musical theater, opera and shows for/by children and teens, and storytelling. Minnesota Fringe, like many fringe festivals, has proven to be an excellent launching point for new work.

=== Accessibility ===
Each venue is wheelchair-accessible and the festival offers ASL-interpreted shows for the deaf and hard-of-hearing, as well as audio-described shows for the blind.

=== "Bring Your Own Venue" ===
In the past, Minnesota Fringe has provided an option for companies to produce site-specific work outside the official venues. The Bring Your Own Venue (BYOV) option was only available for shows that could not normally fit into a traditional theater space. Past BYOV shows have been staged in places such as a clothing store dressing area, a swimming pool, an art gallery and a coffee shop. In 2006, 23 shows, a record number, performed in BYOV slots.

=== Website ===
The Minnesota Fringe Festival Website operates year-round. All of the shows in the yearly festival are up for review by any audience member who registers on the site. Shows are rated on a scale of 0 to 5 stars along with a written review. Each show is assigned an overall star rating based on the average of all the reviews received. Minnesota Fringe also retains a staff of photographers who attend shows and return photographs for the festival's daily slide show. During the six-week 2013 festival period, the site received over a million pageviews.

== Statistics ==
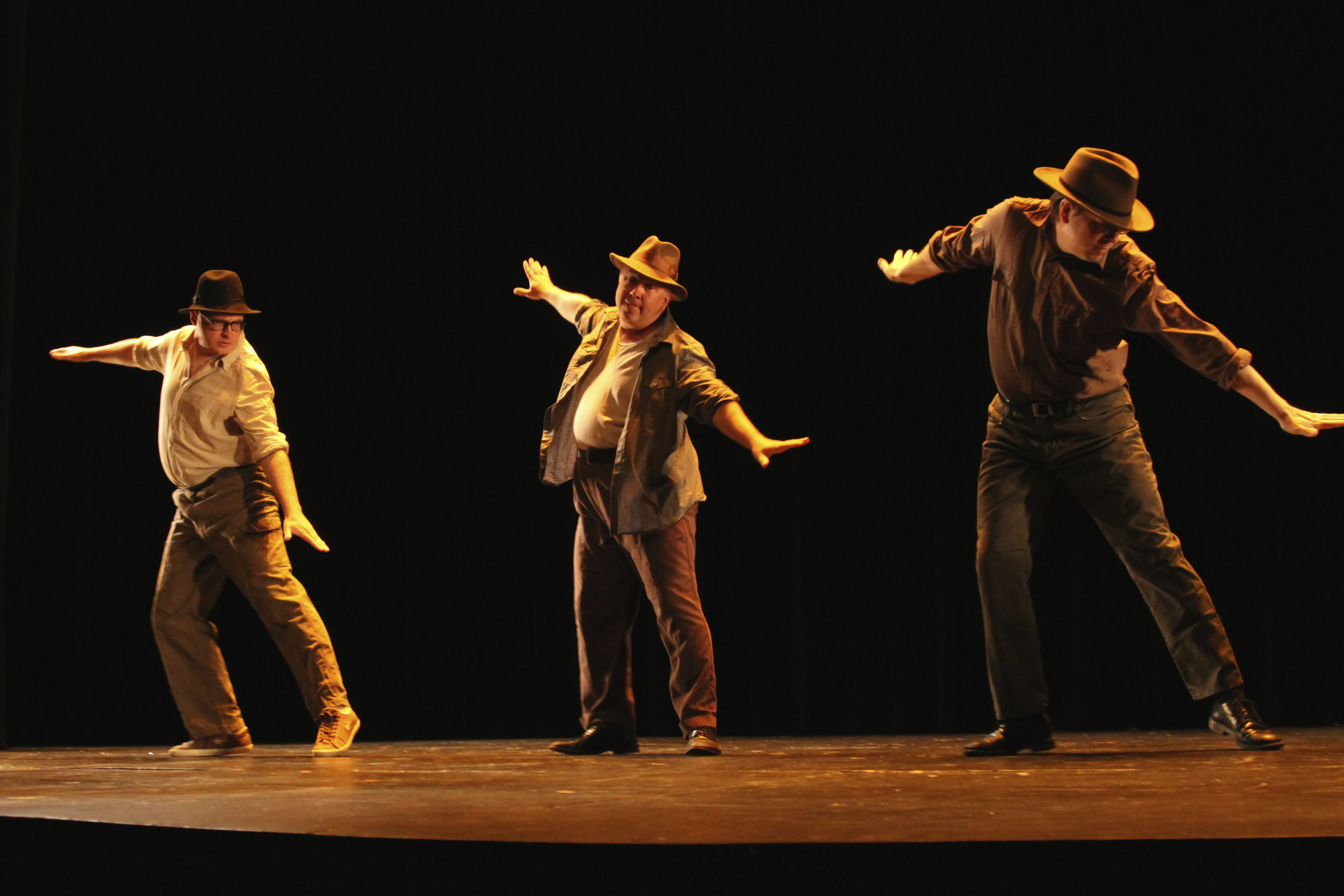
Jumpin' Jack Kerouac at the U of M Rarig Proscenium in 2014
