= List of Minnesota Fringe Festivals =

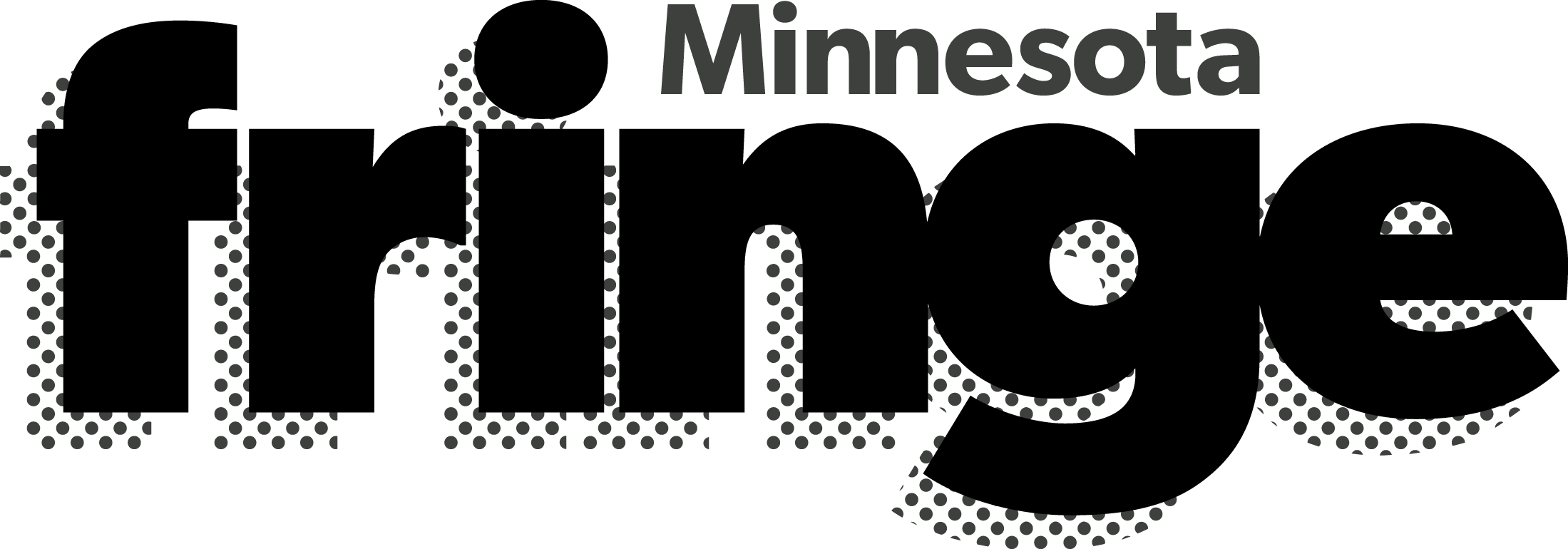
Minnesota Fringe Festival logo

The Minnesota Fringe Festival is a performing arts festival held annually at various venues throughout Minneapolis, Minnesota. (Note: Historically, the festival has also occasionally occupied venues in neighboring Saint Paul, Minnesota.) The tradition of fringe festivals began with the establishment of the Edinburgh Festival Fringe in 1947, and starting in 1991, producers began to establish festivals of their own in the United States. The first Minnesota Fringe Festival took place in 1994, with 53 shows presented at six venues across Minneapolis's Cedar-Riverside neighborhood. Although early iterations of the festival included film screenings and visual art exhibitions, the festival later narrowed its focus to performing arts in five categories: comedy, dance, drama, musical, and "something different". During its first four iterations, the festival took place in late June and early July. Since 1998, it has taken place during late July and early August, consistently running for 11 days annually since 2005, when it expanded from a 10-day run.

The festival grew from its inception in 1994, in terms of the number of shows presented, venues occupied, and tickets purchased, to become the largest unjuried fringe festival in the United States, a distinction it held until 2018 when it was overtaken by the Orlando International Fringe Theater Festival and the Washington, D.C., Capital Fringe Festival. In 2010, over 50,000 tickets were sold for the first time, and in 2015, more performances took place (909) and tickets were sold (50,338) than in any other year. The most shows (177) were presented in 2013, and two years, 2004 and 2015, tied for the most venues utilized by the festival, with 24 apiece. This value includes traditional theaters as well as site-specific venues, which can vary from year to year and have included a loading dock, a bedroom, a bathroom, and a moving car.

The 2020 iteration was initially canceled on account of the COVID-19 pandemic before being retooled as an entirely virtual festival. Both live and in-person performances were presented for the 2021 festival, though unlike in previous years, the Minnesota Fringe did not staff in-person venues. The most recent iteration of the festival ran from August 6–16, 2026.

== Festivals ==
Year	Dates	No. of shows	No. of performances (Note: Each show in the festival is given five performances. The bestselling show at each venue is then granted a sixth encore performance.)	Attendance	Venues (Note: The number of venues is counted as the number of stages or other playing spaces utilized. The Rarig Center, for example, houses four stages and counts as four venues in years when the festival is using all four of them.)	References
1994	June 23 – July 2	53	315	4,630	6	
1995	June 22 – July 3	≤50	400	5,500	5	
1996	June 20–30	46	250	4,464	5	
1997	June 19–29	35	—	4,300	5	
1998	July 30 – August 9	38	~200	6,573	6	
1999	July 29 – August 8	68	—	15,447	10	
2000	July 28 – August 6	100	500	>23,000	19	
2001	August 3–12	120	—	28,835	21	
2002	August 2–11	148	>675	32,000	14	
2003	August 1–10	162	783	40,500	20	
2004	August 6–15	176	900	43,836	24	
2005	August 4–14	168	855	44,630	20	
2006	August 3–13	165	890	44,814	23	
2007	August 2–12	162	872	37,752	23	
2008	July 31 – August 10	156	808	40,926	18	
2009	July 30 – August 9	162	843	46,189	22	
2010	August 5–15	169	876	50,256	15	
2011	August 4–14	168	865	48,350	18	
2012	August 2–12	164	840	48,432	15	
2013	August 1–11	177	897	50,007	16	
2014	July 31 – August 10	169	878	50,265	15	
2015	July 30 – August 9	174	909	50,338	24	
2016	August 4–14	168	869	47,882	19	
2017	August 3–13	167	850	46,076	17	
2018	August 2–12	138	694	~36,400	16	
2019	August 1–11	142	729	34,440	17	
2020	July 30 – August 9	>22 (Note: There were 22 live virtual shows presented during the 2020 Minnesota Fringe plus "many more" available to patrons who purchased access to the festival's "digital hub".)	>22	—	n/a (Note: The 2020 festival was entirely virtual due to the COVID-19 pandemic.)	
2021	August 5–15	116	260	3,650	~12 (Note: The 2021 festival took place both virtually and in-person, with in-person shows at both traditional theaters and site-specific venues. This value only includes in-person venues.)	
2022	August 4–14	113	585	21,200	11	
2023	August 3–13	101	525	>20,000	15	
2024	August 1–11	105	~500	—	14	
2025	July 31 – August 10	99	550	<25,000	13	
2026	August 6–16	104	540	25,387	13	
