= 2006 Music City Bowl =

2006 Gaylord Hotels Music City Bowl presented by Bridgestone
- 9th Music City Bowl
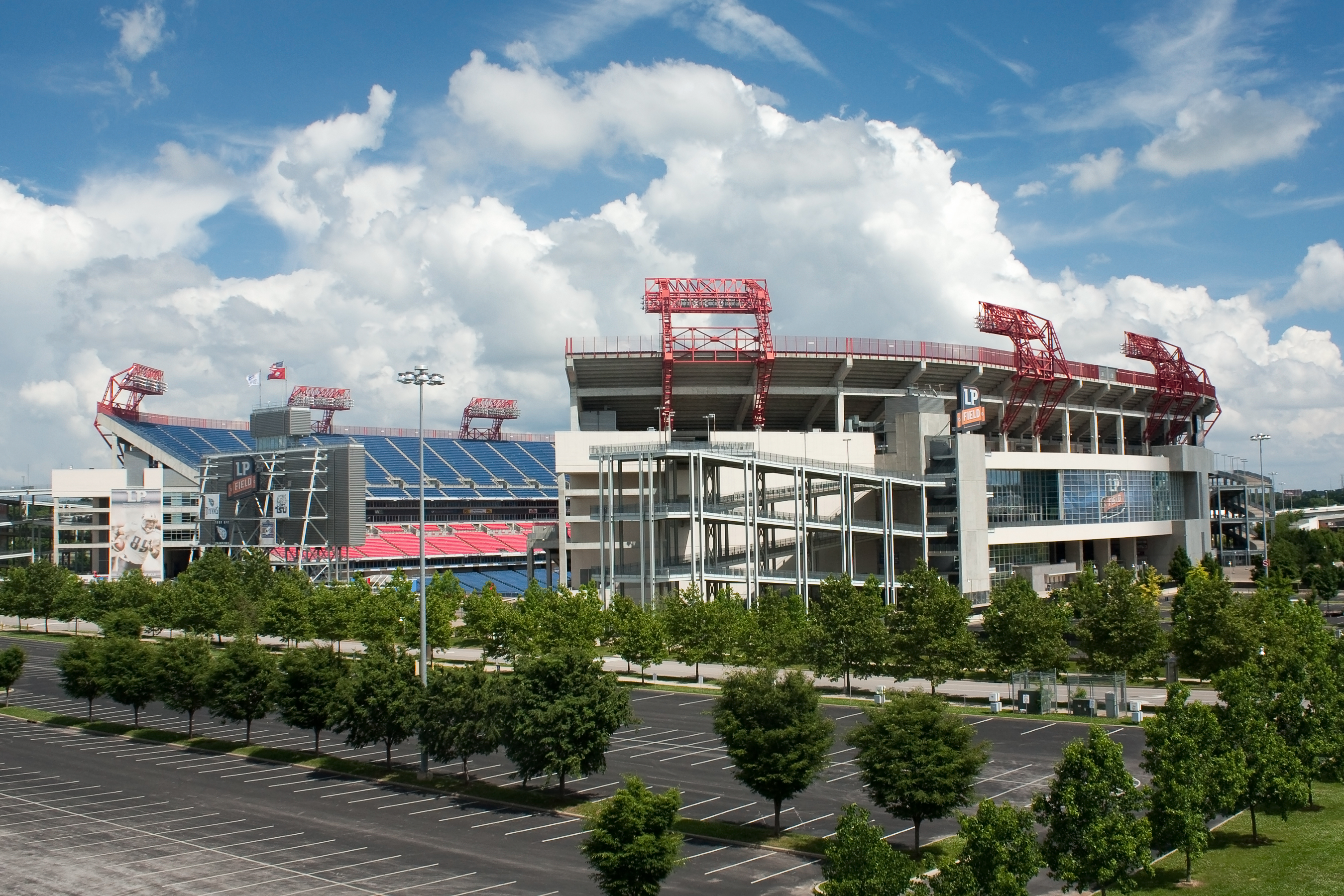
- LP Field in Nashville, Tennessee, hosted the Music City Bowl.
Clemson Tigers	Kentucky Wildcats
(8–4)	(7–5)
ACC	SEC
20	28
Head coach: Tommy Bowden	Head coach: Rich Brooks
	1	2	3	4	Total
Clemson	0	6	0	14	20
Kentucky	7	7	7	7	28
- Date: December 29, 2006
- Season: 2006
- Stadium: LP Field
- Location: Nashville, Tennessee
- MVP: QB André Woodson, Kentucky
- Favorite: Clemson favored by 10
- Referee: Clete Blakeman (Big 12)
- Attendance: 68,024
- Payout: US$1,600,000 per team

United States TV coverage
- Network: ESPN
- Announcers: Dave Pasch, Rod Gilmore, Trevor Matich, & Stacey Dales

The 2006 Music City Bowl featured the Clemson Tigers and the Kentucky Wildcats. Clemson entered the game with a record of 8–4 after having been ranked in the AP poll for most weeks of the season, as high as No. 10; Kentucky was 7–5 and unranked. Clemson was favored by 10 points. Sponsored by Gaylord Hotels and Bridgestone, it was officially named the Gaylord Hotels Music City Bowl presented by Bridgestone.

== Recap of game ==
Micah Johnson scored on a 1-yard touchdown run to give Kentucky a 7–0 lead over Clemson. Clemson quarterback Will Proctor then fired a 32-yard touchdown pass to wide receiver Durrell Barry, but the extra point missed, and Kentucky still led 7–6. Kentucky quarterback André Woodson found wide receiver DeMoreo Ford for a 70-yard touchdown pass with 2:14 left in the half to take a 14–6 lead.

In the third quarter, Woodson found Dicky Lyons, Jr. for a 24-yard touchdown pass and a 21–6 lead. In the fourth quarter, Woodson threw a 13-yard touchdown pass to Jacob Tamme for a 28–6 lead. Will Proctor threw a 17-yard touchdown pass with 7:25 left, to get within 28–12. The 2-point conversion attempt failed. With 44 seconds left, Will Proctor threw a 17-yard touchdown pass to wide receiver Aaron Kelly. The 2-point conversion attempt to Michael Palmer was good, and Clemson trailed 28–20. The onside kick was recovered by Kentucky, who ran out the clock.

== Aftermath ==
With the win, the Wildcats won their first bowl game since 1984. Kentucky would return to this same bowl the following year,

The Tigers and the Wildcats would meet again in the 2023 Gator Bowl.
