= Jonathan May Day =

Mr. Jonathan May Day or Jonathan May Day is celebrated May 1st in Orange County, Florida. Jonathan May Day was first proclaimed by Mayor of Orange County, Florida, Richard Crotty in 2010 to honor the life of Central Florida music educator Jonathan May.

The first Mr. Jonathan May Day celebration was held at Trinity Preparatory School on May 1, 2010, with the proclamation read live to the crowd by District Five Orange County Commissioner Bill Segal. The reading was followed by musical performances and tribute speeches by students of Mr. May and his wife, Maureen May.

The 2011 Mr. Jonathan May Day celebration takes place on May 1, 2011 at St. Luke's Lutheran Church in Oviedo, Florida. The Metropolitan Area Youth Symphony, of which Mr. May is honorary founder, will perform and feature the world premiere of Robert Kerr's "Elegy," which was inspired by Mr. May.
