= Mad Cow Theatre =

Florida theatre

Mad Cow Theatre was a not-for-profit regional theatre based in Orlando, Florida. Founded in 1997, the theatre was located in Downtown Orlando within the central business district.

== History ==
Mad Cow Theater began in late 1997, founded by Rus Blackwell, Trudy Bruner, Alan Bruun, and Dennis Neal, as a simple two-show project in a former blueprint studio in Maitland, Florida. Shortly after, the venue moved numerous times in a four-year period. Renting space from Central Florida organizations such as Rollins College, Orlando-UCF Shakespeare Festival, Civic Theatre of Central Florida, and the Orlando International Fringe Theater Festival.

Supported in part with public funds from United Arts of Central Florida, the State of Florida Department of State, Division of Cultural Affairs, and Orange County through the Arts & Cultural Affairs program, as well as local theatre community members, the Mad Cow Theatre has received a 2013 Golden Brick Award for contributions to increasing the quality of life downtown, and was named "Best Theatre" by Orlando Magazine in 2011, 2012, and 2013.

Adult and teen acting classes are directed and taught by local talent and professors from Rollins and UCF.

== Facilities ==
In October 2012, Mad Cow moved to the location at 54 W. Church St. The venue houses two theaters, which share a common lobby, box office, and coffee and wine bar. The facility has a combined capacity of 227. The theaters are used for regular season productions, the Orlando Cabaret Festival, as well as business meetings and community and social events.

- The Harriett Theatre has seating for 167. It is named after Harriett Lake, a prominent philanthropist for the arts and other causes in Central Florida. Limited-view seats are included in the total count due to a structural column in the theatre.
- The Zehngebot-Stonerock Theatre is a black-box theatre with seating for 60.

The theater relocated from the Church St. address in May 2022 as a result of a forbearance agreement with the City of Orlando.

== Recent Production History ==
=== The Harriett Theatre ===
==== 2017-2018 Season ====
- Big River – Sept. 22-Oct. 22, 2017
- Born Yesterday – Nov. 17-Dec. 17, 2017
- The Tale of the Allergist's Wife – Jan. 19-Feb. 18, 2018
- A View From the Bridge – March 23-April 22, 2018
- Fun Home – June 1-July 1, 2018
- The Little Foxes – Aug. 3-26, 2018

=== The Zehngebot-Stonerock Theatre ===
2017-2018 Season

- Grounded – Oct. 20-Nov. 19, 2017
- Silent Sky – Feb. 16-March 18, 2018
- Bad Jews – June 15-July 8, 2018
- Buyer & Cellar – Aug. 10-Sept. 9, 2018

Special Events

- Teatro Español: Prohibido Suicidarse en Primavera – Sept. 27-Oct. 1, 2017
- Teatro Español: Amor de Don Perlimplin con Belisa en su jardin — Jan. 10-14, 2018
- Teatro Español: Romeo y Julieta — Feb. 6 and 7, 2018
- Other special events will be announced.

== Collaborations ==
=== The Orlando Philharmonic Orchestra ===
Mad Cow Theatre has collaborated with the Orlando Philharmonic Orchestra for several concerts, presented at Bob Carr Theater. Those productions have included The Music Man, Sweeney Todd, My Fair Lady, and Guys and Dolls, and have attracted star talent, including Davis Gaines and Faith Prince. They have also collaborated on a series of concert opera productions, including Carmen and Porgy and Bess to fill the void left by the now-defunct Orlando Opera.
