= Orlando International Fringe Theater Festival =

Fringe festival in Orlando

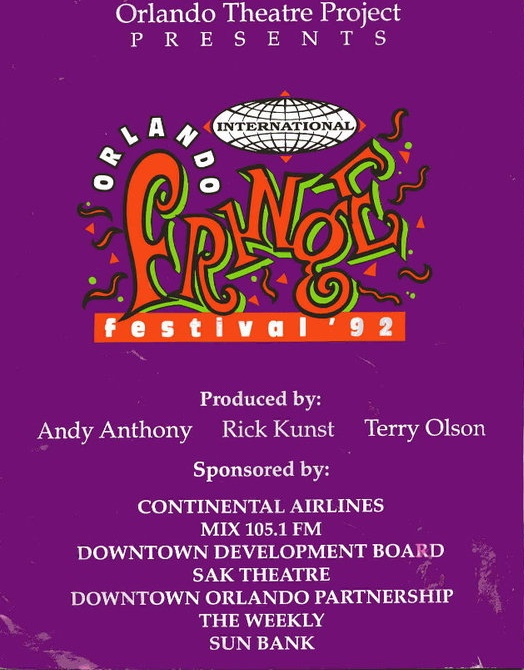
A program from the first Orlando International Fringe Theatre Festival, held in 1992.

The Orlando International Fringe Theatre Festival (also referred to as The Orlando Fringe) is a 14-day annual arts festival that takes place in Orlando, Florida, every May. The festival features 850 ticketed theatrical performances on indoor and outdoor stages, produced by local, national and international artists. It is an open access (or "unjuried") performing arts festival, meaning there is no selection committee, and anyone may participate, with any type of performance.

Founded in 1992, it was the second official fringe theatre festival in the United States and is now America's oldest still-operating fringe theatre festival, celebrating its 30th anniversary in 2021. The festival has been voted the Best Local Festival of Orlando and has been dubbed “Orlando’s Most Unique Cultural Experience.”

The festival is organized by Orlando Fringe, a 501(c)(3) organization which provides venues for artists and supporting services.

== History ==
=== 1992–1999: early years and growth ===
Founders Terry Olson, Rick Kunst, and Andy Anthony originally came to Orlando as members of the SAK Theatre Company, which produced, performed, and managed live audience participatory comedy shows at Disney’s Epcot. When Disney failed to renew their contract, SAK refocused on launching its own Orlando theatre venue, hosting a troupe of performers who traveled to Renaissance fairs and fringe festivals.

In the early 1980s, a group of SAK's touring artists, led by Olson, performed at the Edinburgh Fringe. The experience made a strong impression on the troupe. A few years later, co-founder Rick Kunst, inspired by the Edmonton Fringe Festival in Canada, suggested to Olson that SAK consider bringing a fringe festival to Orlando. The pair decided to bring on Andy Anthony as a third founding producer, as Anthony had extensive experience on the Canadian fringe circuit.

The team determined the festival structure would be a combination of the Canadian fringe production models with the guiding principles of Edinburgh Fringe. While the Edinburgh Fringe had no central production team and relied on individual performance groups to find their own venues and manage their technical needs, the Canadian fringes provided venues, technicians, and equipment to cover basic sound and lighting. After experiencing both models, the festival founders determined that Orlando was better suited for a Canadian management style.

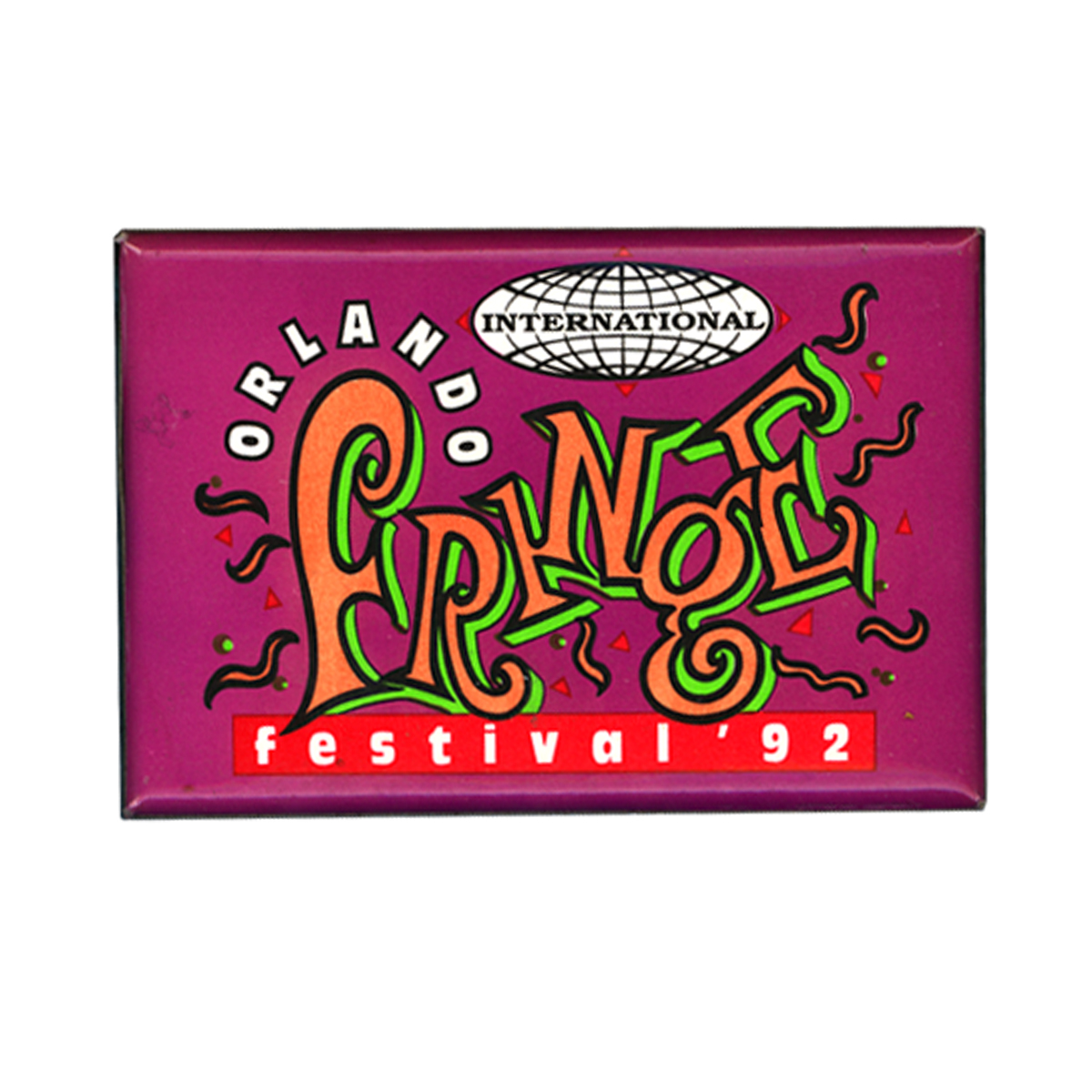
The logo from the 1st Annual Orlando International Fringe Theatre Festival in 1992.

The Orlando International Fringe Festival premiered with a ten-day event opening on April 24, 199. Performers were chosen on a first-come-first-served basis, with the 28 performing groups. The total annual operating budget was $79,000.

The second annual festival saw attendance of 25,000 – 30,000 people, doubling the number of attendees from the year prior. The festival hosted 35 performance groups from as far away as Uganda, the United Kingdom, Norway, and Canada with two new venues added to meet demand.

In 1994, Orlando Fringe became the southernmost member of the Canadian Association of Fringe Festivals. The 3rd Annual Orlando Fringe Festival saw 50,000 attendees. The following year, Orlando Fringe became a nonprofit organization, forming its first Board of Directors and adopting its bylaws. The 4th Annual Orlando Fringe Festival saw 70,000 people attend the festival, which had expanded to 7 venues.

In 1999, Orlando Fringe was ranked the #1 U.S. Fringe Festival for attendance, with 13,000 tickets sold, and #1 among U.S. Festivals for dollars returned, with over $60,000 going back to artists. Orlando Fringe was ranked #5 in North America for attendance and dollars returned to artists.

=== 2000–2010: challenges and resilience ===
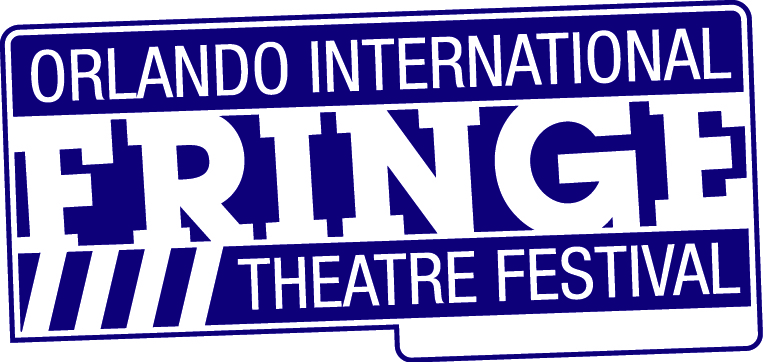
The Orlando Fringe logo used from 2003 - 2012

In 2002, a fire broke out in the old Bryan Hotel on West Church Street, where Orlando Fringe stored its schedule boards, podiums, and archives. No programs or photos survived the fire. Local businesses and artists rallied to raise funds for Orlando Fringe. The 11th Annual Orlando Fringe Festival shifted to May to make it easier for local theme park employees to participate.

In 2003, the Seattle Fringe Festival closed, making Orlando Fringe the longest continuous-running Fringe Festival in the United States.

In 2004, the 13th Annual Orlando Fringe Festival venues split between Downtown Orlando and Loch Haven Park. The following year, the festival shifted to Loch Haven Park entirely.

In 2009, an economic impact study of the festival showed that it contributed $1.46 million to the Orlando economy.

=== 2011–2019: milestones and expansion ===
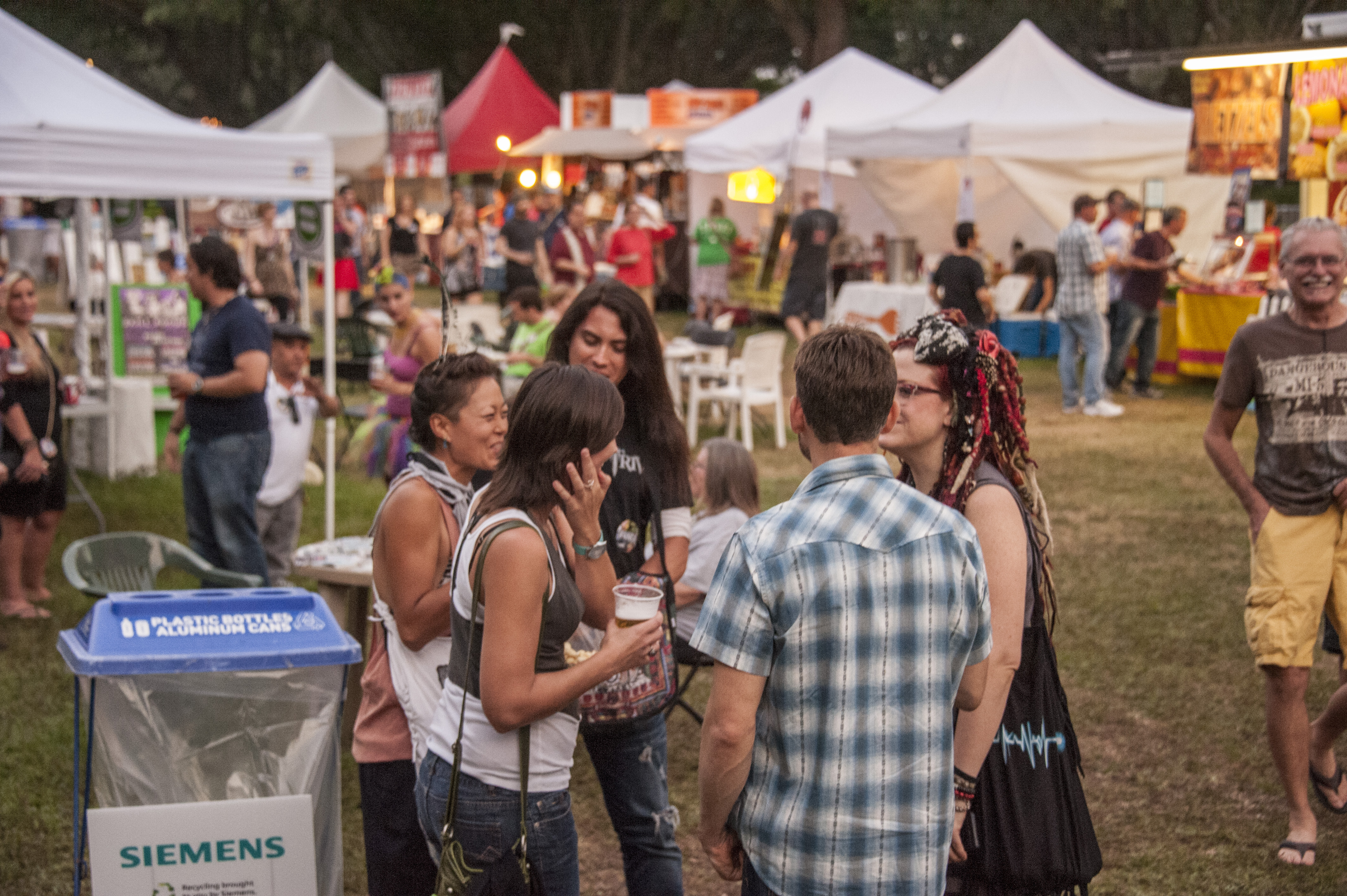
The lawn serves as a hub for patrons to enjoy free entertainment, food and drinks.

In 2014, Orlando Fringe hosted the CAFF and USAFF Conferences, welcoming representatives from 70 fringe festivals from around the world.

In 2015, an economic impact study showed Orlando Fringe's impact surpassed 2 million dollars in local revenue. Attendance surged by 30%, making it the most financially successful festival in history, with more than $375,000 in artist payments. Orlando Fringe moves its year-round operations to Loch Haven Park, housed inside the Lowndes Shakespeare Center.

In 2017, the 1st Annual Orlando Fringe Winter Mini-Fest took place January 5–8. It consisted of only four venues and 21 shows hand-picked from the past festival. The 26th Annual Orlando Fringe Festival attracted 70,400 attendees and expanded to 14 days. That same year, Executive Director George Wallace left the Orlando Fringe to work for the Indianapolis Fringe Festival. Alauna Friskics was named the new Executive Director as a result of her work with the nearby Garden Theatre in the city of Winter Garden, Florida, and her previous involvement with Orlando Fringe.

In 2019, the Winter Mini-Fest expanded to include new works from favorite Orlando Fringe performers and works by performers who have never performed in Orlando. Micheal Marinaccio moved to the newly created position of Show Director while his former associate producer, Lindsay Taylor stepped into the newly created role of Theatre Producer. The 28th Annual Orlando Fringe Festival was proclaimed "The Best Year Ever," with attendance at an all-time high.

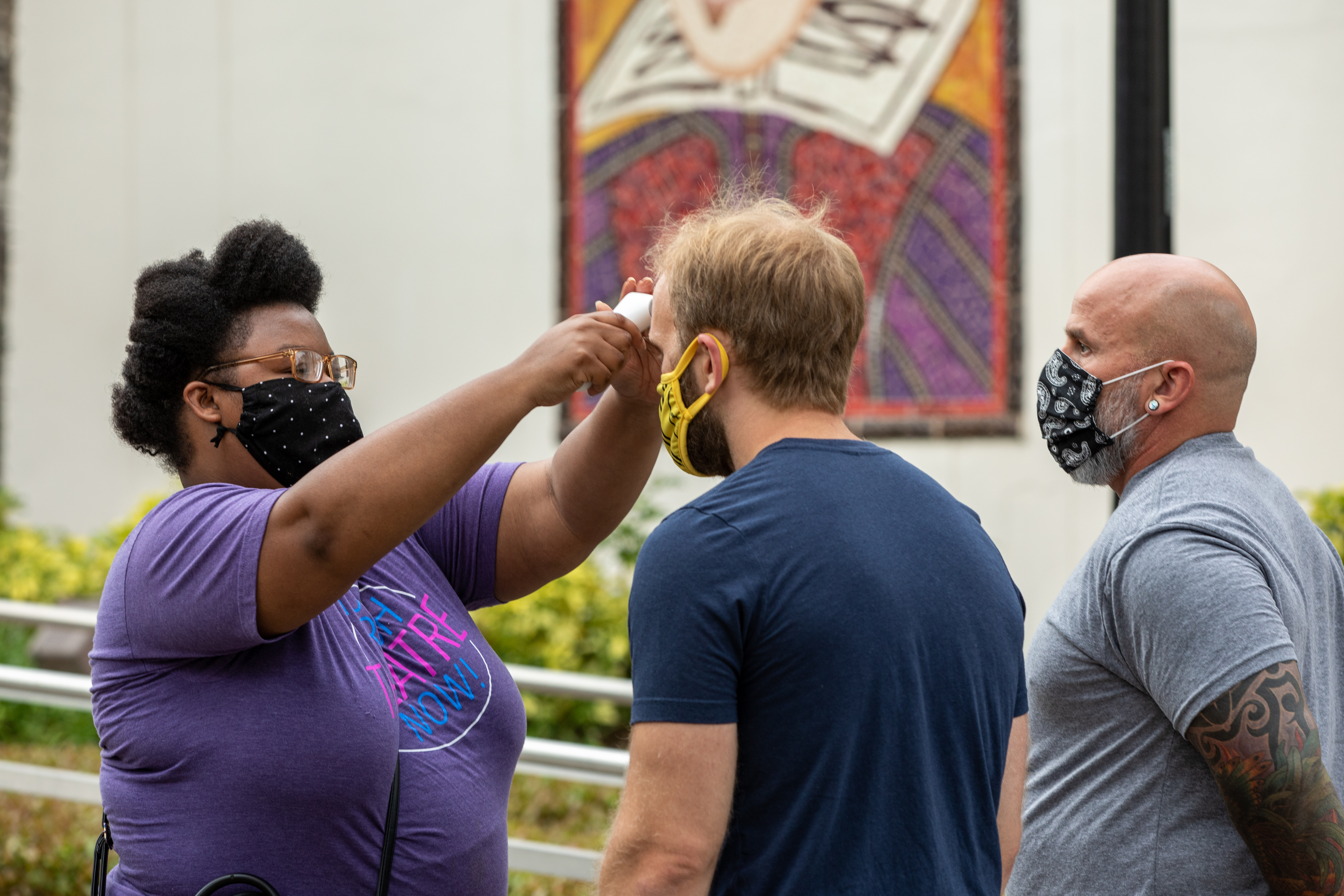
Following the prior year's online festival, the 30th Annual Orlando International Fringe Theatre Festival was held in-person with additional COVID-19 safety protocols in 2021.

=== 2020–present: innovation and adaptation ===
On March 19, 2020, festival organizers announced that due to the outbreak of COVID-19, the 29th Annual Orlando International Fringe Festival was canceled. Executive Director Alauna Friskics said of the cancellation, "We have worked countless financial scenarios and considered all stakeholders. We believe this is the most prudent course so the festival can come back strong next year." On April 23, 2020, Orlando Fringe announced an online festival called "Fringe Today" that would span May 12–25, the same dates as the canceled annual festival. The event took place on Zoom and Facebook with the feed broadcast on the festival website. The online event featured live and recorded performances, interviews, and demonstrations. During the opening ceremonies, Orlando Mayor Buddy Dyer proclaimed that Fringe Today would count as the 29th festival for the organization.

On February 17, 2021, festival organizers announced they would be returning on May 18–31, 2021 with a live in-person festival and introduced DigiFringe, a digital performance festival that would take place June 4–18, 2021.

Orlando Fringe hosted delegates from other Fringe Festivals around the world as host of the World Fringe Congress on May 19–23, 2022.

In January 2023, Orlando Fringe opened the 9,100-square-foot Fringe ArtSpace, taking the place of Mad Cow Theatre at 54 W. Church St., with the mission of offering "artist-focused programming" focused on "building a dynamic, inspiring community of artists and arts lovers with the purpose of providing artists a safe environment to create, experiment, collaborate and showcase their creations."

Executive Director, Alauna Friskics announced her resignation as Executive Director in October 2023 and left the position in January of 2024.

Orlando Fringe brought on Scott Galibraith as Interim Director who left the job after six months. The Orlando Fringe Board of Directors decided to split the role in a “tri-directorate model”. Genevieve Bernard was named Director of Experience, Tempestt Halstead was named Festival Producer, and Melissa E. Fitzinger as Managing Director.

September 2024 had Orlando Fringe debuting a new annual festival, Orlando OutFest, a festival celebrating Central Florida's queer artists and their stories. Due to financial and sustainability concerns, the 2025 OutFest was cancelled. It returns September 2026 as a four-day festival curated by George Wallace, executive director of The Center Orlando and past executive director of Orlando Fringe.

In February 2025, the Orlando Fringe decided to close ArtSpace citing the after-effects of flooding, low box office numbers, and the logistical challenges of running an arts operation downtown.

In February 2026, Orlando Fringe announced they were moving their administration offices out of the City of Orlando owned Lowndes Shakespeare Center where they have been since 2015, citing an unacceptable rent increase and dissatisfaction with Orlando Shakes as a landlord. Orlando Fringe announced their new office space is nearby on Virginia Drive. The move has ramifications for both Orlando Fringe and The Orlando Shakes, who lost $50,000 in annual rent. Both organizations said they hope to agree on terms of use of the theaters inside the Shakespeare Center for the annual festival in May.

== Festival programs ==
=== Kids Fringe ===
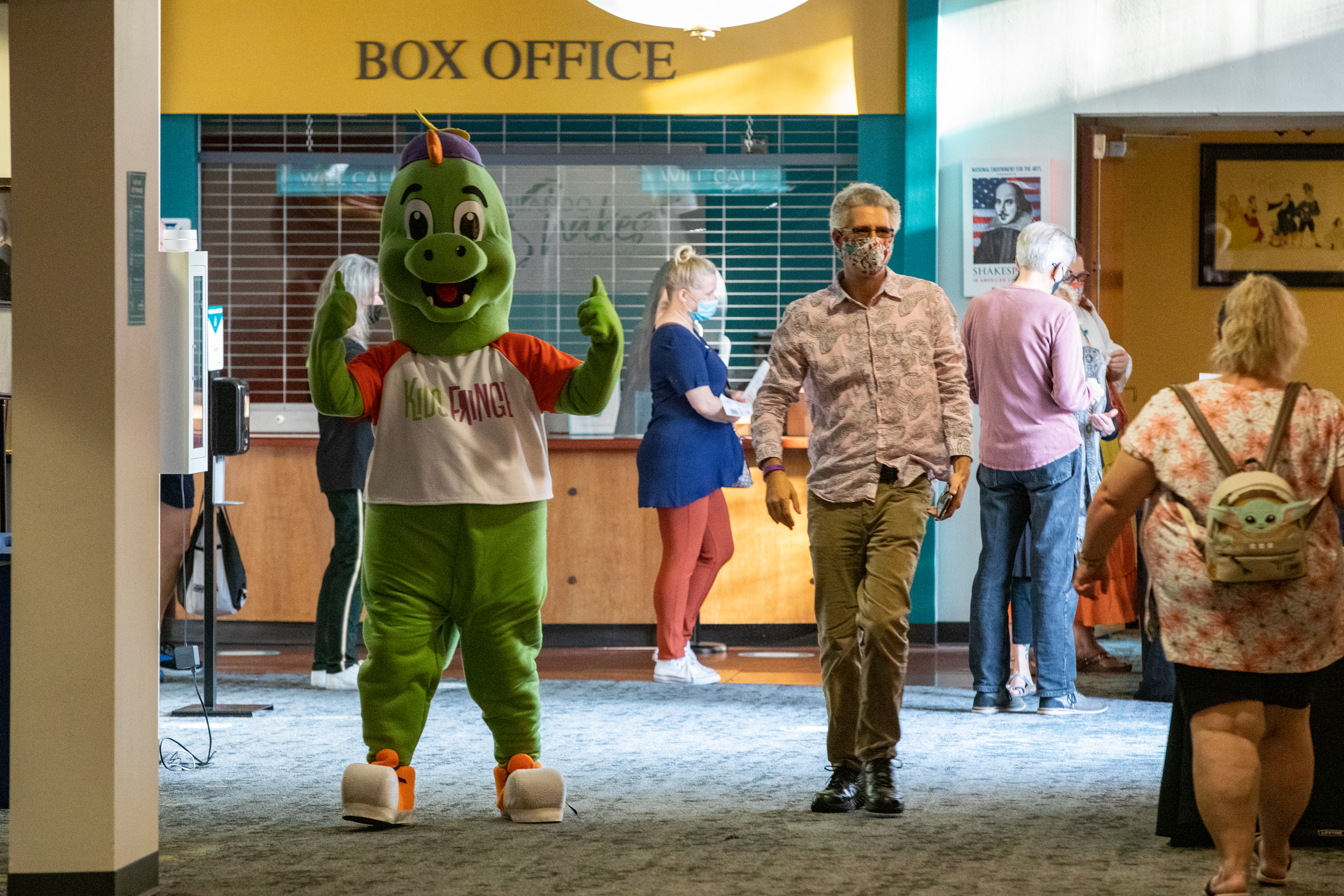
The Fringezilla mascot has undergone several redesigns since its introduction in 1995 and remains a fixture at Kids Fringe events.

Kids Fringe is an extension of the Orlando International Fringe Theatre Festival that produces live performances, workshops, and immersive activities aimed at the "young and young-at-heart". The Kids Fringe team brings play and entertainment to events such as the Orlando International Fringe Theatre Festival and Winter Mini-Fest. In addition to Fringe events, Kids Fringe has also brought free activities to events like Audubon Park Garden District, Come Out with Pride, and other events throughout the Central Florida area.

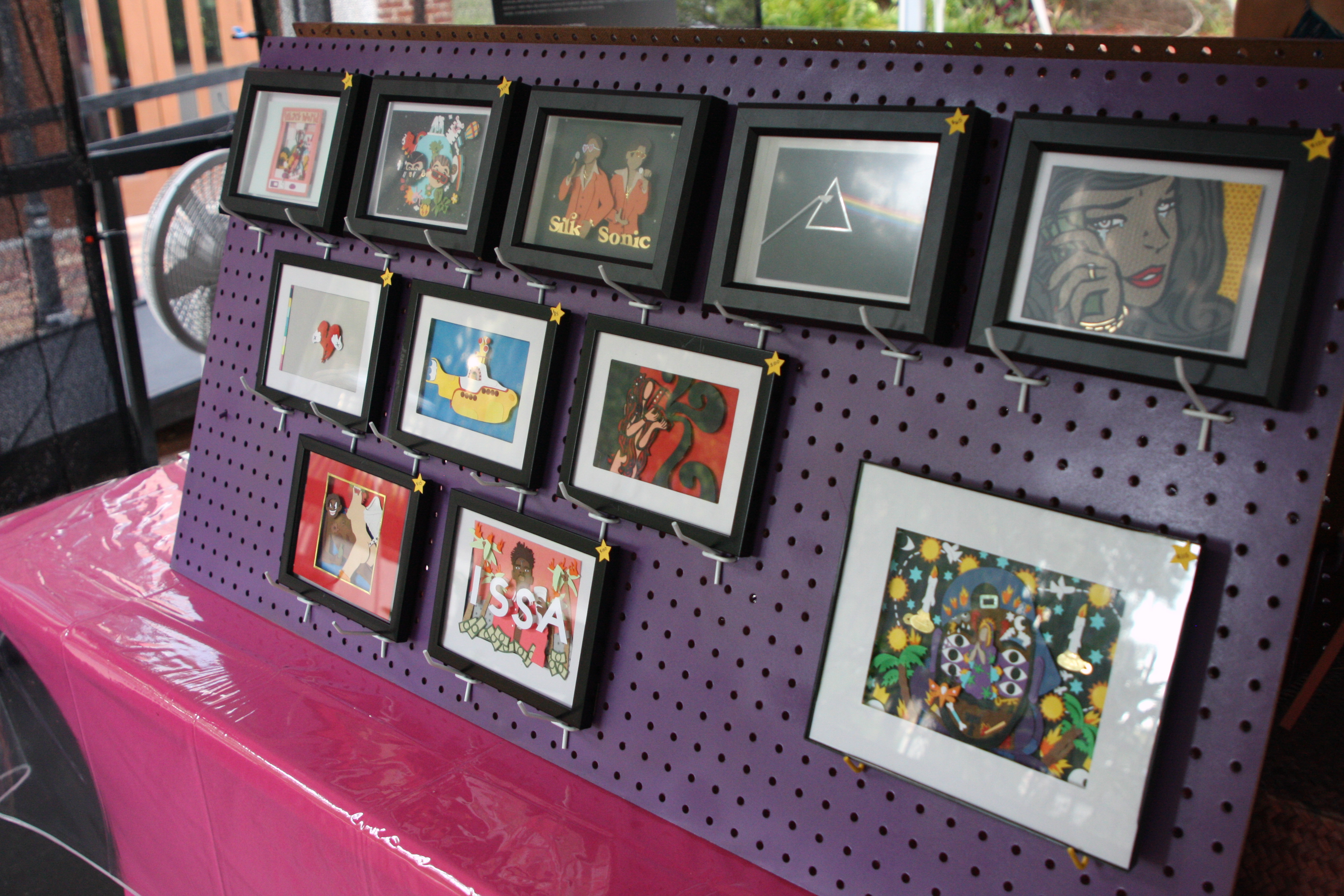
Visual Fringe offers an opportunity for visual artists to showcase and sell their work as part of the larger festival.

=== Visual Fringe ===
Visual Fringe is the visual arts portion of the Orlando International Fringe Theatre Festival, featuring drawing, painting, sculpture, design, jewelry making, and more. It is entirely unjuried and uncensored, with 100% of the money made in art sales going back to the artists. The exhibition includes a gallery, art market, workshops, classes, crafts, demonstrations, selfie backdrops, and events. Anyone is welcome to enter their work regardless of experience level.

=== Fringers of the Future ===
Fringers of the Future is a program dedicated to supporting the teachers who shape the next generation of performing artists. Any middle or high school can apply to perform at the Orlando International Fringe Theatre Festival in May with waived application and performance fees. A lottery drawing is held to determine which schools are offered a slot in the festival, with up to three performance slots given and 100% of ticket sales returned to the program. Fringe also provides workshops on industry topics, marketing support, and an opportunity for students to perform on a world-renowned stage and make connections with performers from around the world.

=== The Outdoor Stage ===
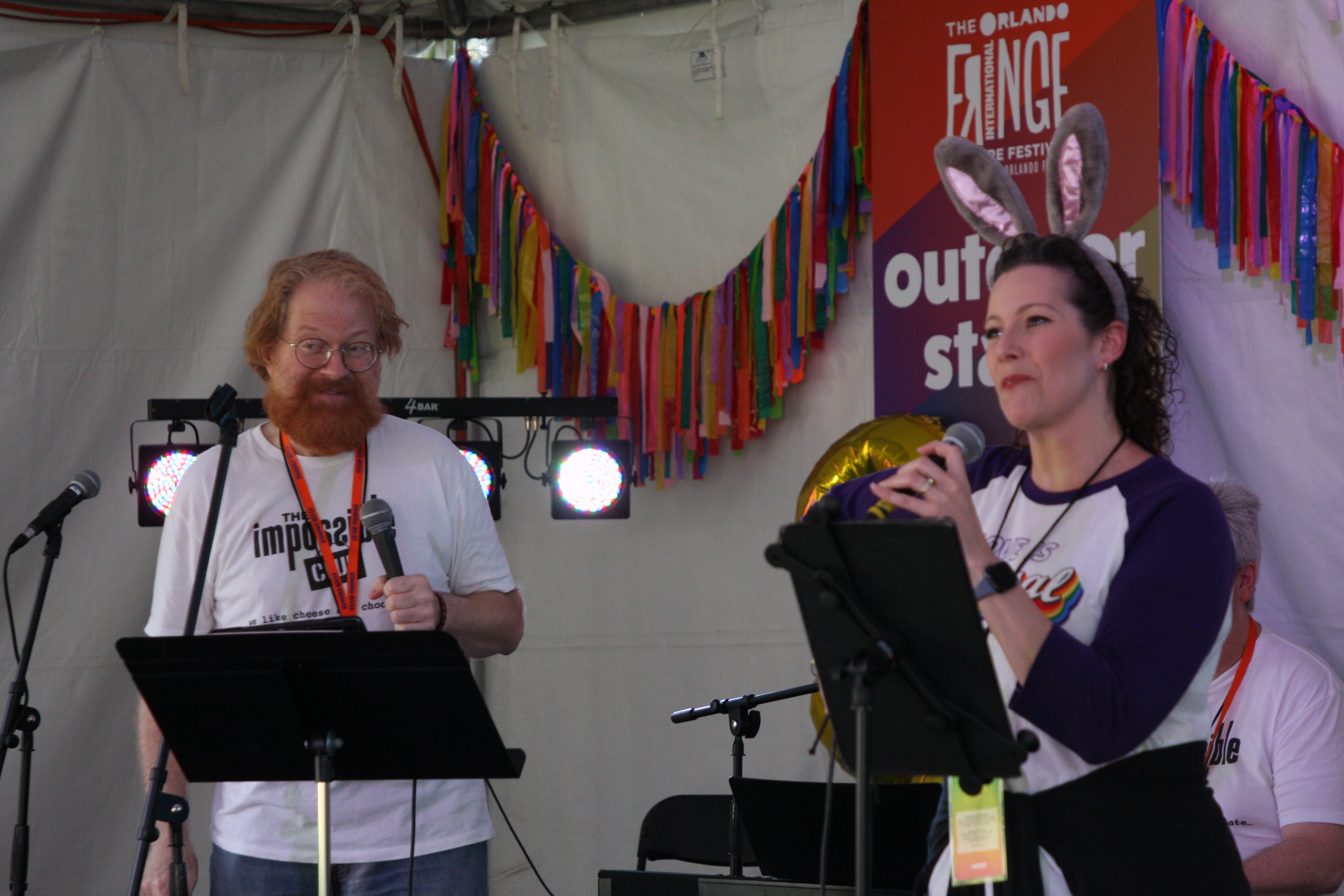
The Outdoor Stage hosts free live entertainment in Loch Haven Park.

The Free Outdoor Stage on The Orlando Fringe Lawn offers visitors to the festival another experience between shows and throughout the entire festival. The stage offers free cross-genre live music, live art, dance parties, dance troupes, stand-up comedy, comedic improv, poetry competitions, literary readings, and promotional snippets for official Orlando Fringe shows. Visitors to the festival can grab a drink, pull up a chair, and take in the sights and sounds of the two free outdoor stages.

=== Club Fringe ===
In 2016, to celebrate the organization's 25th anniversary a program aimed at celebrating the Fringe donors. Originally named Club 25, any individual making a donation of $100 or more would gain membership. Memberships included special early ticket buying and access to an air-conditioned tent on the Fringe Lawn. The program changed its name to Club Fringe in 2017 and changed the program to include a new tier system that rewards donors who support Fringe at a higher level. Donor perks start at $25 where members receive entry to the exclusive Club Fringe Lounge inside the Orlando Museum of Art. Members donating $2,500 or more receive a bevy of benefits including, free Club Fringe t-shirts, collectors pins, free show tickets, and a dedicated festival parking spot.

== Festival venues ==
=== Fringe-managed venues ===
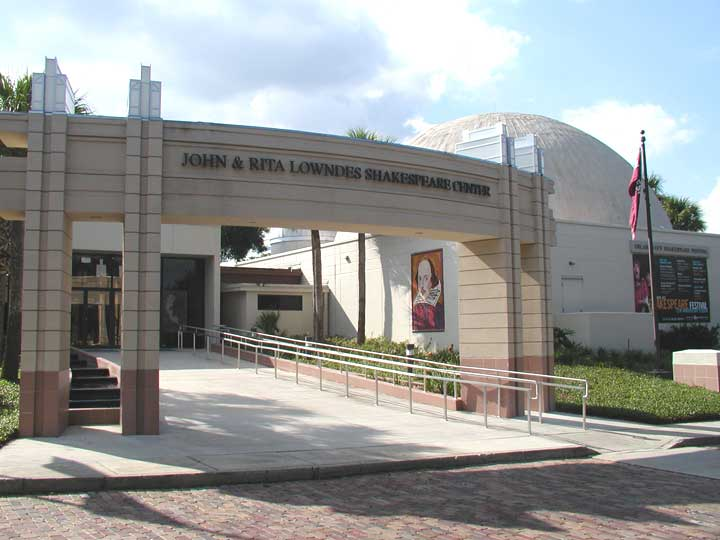
The John & Rita Lowndes Shakespeare Center houses several festival venues, along with the Orlando Fringe offices.

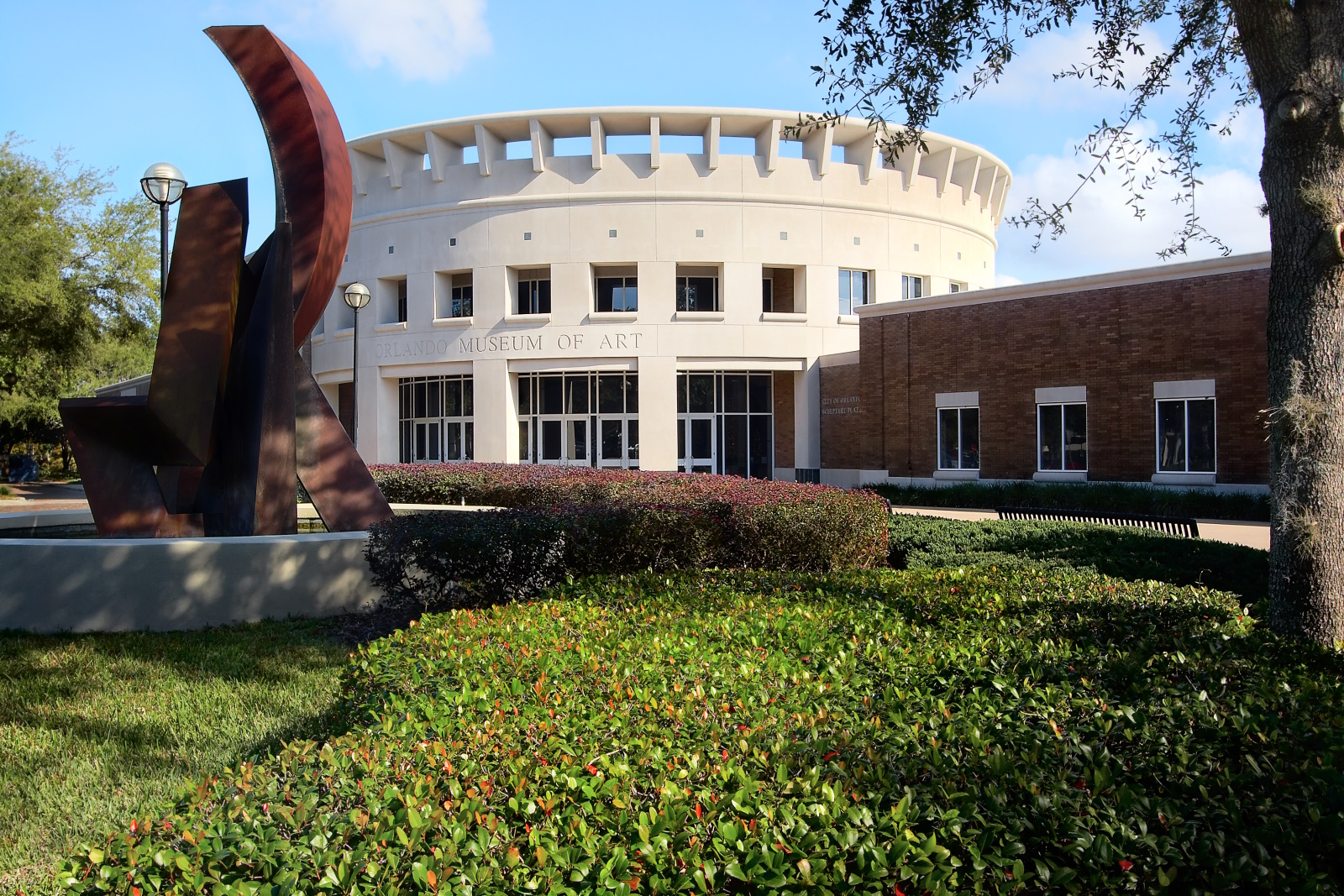
The Orlando Museum of Art, 2007

- Loch Haven Park - Loch Haven Park is the main hub of activity for the Orlando International Fringe Theatre Festival. The park features The Lowndes Shakespeare Center, The Orlando Museum of Art, and Orlando Family Stage. The park's green lawn is home to the Beer Tent, Booze tent, Outdoor Stage, and numerous food vendors.
- Lowndes Shakespeare Center - The Lowndes Shakespeare Center houses the majority of the Fringe Venues along with the main festival box office, Visual Fringe, and a beer tent in the courtyard.
- Renaissance Theatre - The Renaissance Theatre is home to two Fringe Venues and a satellite box office.
- Orlando Museum of Art - The Orlando Museum of Art houses the Gold Venue, Club Fringe lounge, and volunteer check-in.
- Orlando Family Stage - The Orlando Family Stage houses the Green and Silver venues, along with a box office in the lobby of the Silver Venue.
- Orlando Garden Club - The Orlando Garden Club and its surrounding green space are home to Kids Fringe, which is open on Fridays and Saturdays of the festival from 10 AM to 2 PM.

=== Bring Your Own Venue (BYOV) partners ===
The Orlando International Fringe Theatre Festival partners with community venues to turn their location into a Fringe venue. These venues are operated by the festival's partners but are still part of the festival. In 2022, these included:

- The Abbey
- Savoy Orlando
- Stardust Lounge

=== Site-specific venues ===
Fringe artists frequently pitch productions or performances that occur in unconventional locations to the Orlando International Fringe Theatre Festival. These unique venues have included a campfire in front of the green venue and a cargo van in the parking lot.

== See also ==
- Fringe Theatre
