= Ainsley Earhardt =

American television host and author (born 1975/76)

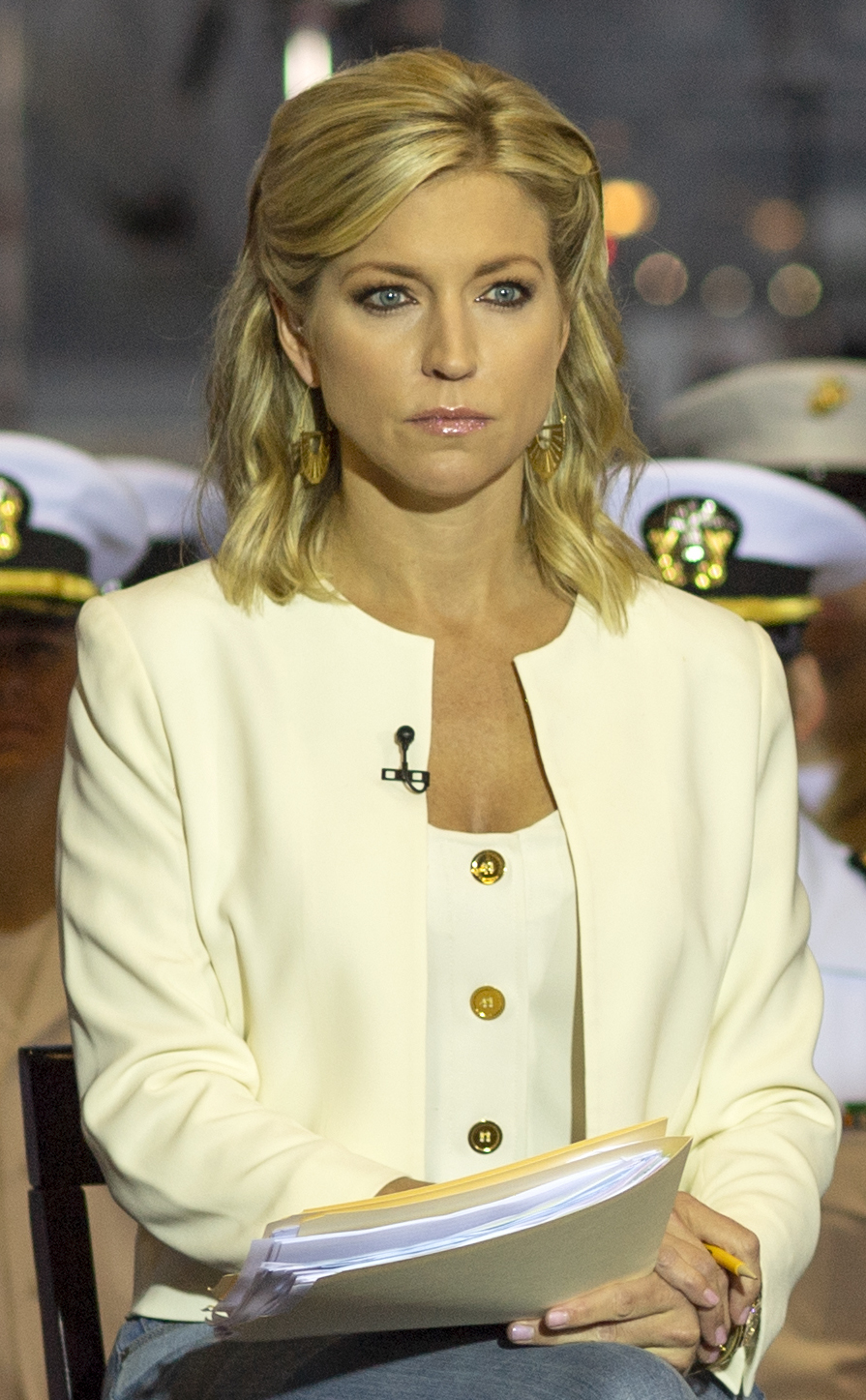
- Earhardt in 2019
- Born: 1975 or 1976 (age 50–51); Spartanburg, South Carolina, U.S.
- Education: Florida State University; University of South Carolina (BA)
- Occupations: Television host; author
- Years active: 2000–present
- Employer: Fox News (2007–present)
- Spouses: Kevin McKinney (m. 2005; div. 2009); Will Proctor (m. 2012; div. 2019); Sean Hannity (m. 2026)
- Children: 1

Ainsley Earhardt (born 1975/1976) is an American conservative television host and author. She is a co-host of Fox & Friends.

== Early life and education ==
Born in Spartanburg, South Carolina, Earhardt as a young child moved with her family to the Foxcroft area of Charlotte, North Carolina. Earhardt's family moved to the Columbia, South Carolina, area when she was still in elementary school. She graduated from Spring Valley High School.

After high school, Earhardt attended Florida State University before transferring to the University of South Carolina, where she graduated with a B.A. in journalism.

== Career ==
=== Local television ===
Earhardt was hired as a reporter for WLTX, the local CBS station in Columbia, South Carolina, before she graduated from University of South Carolina. From 2000 to 2004 she worked as the morning and noon anchor. She traveled to New York City after the September 11 attacks to cover South Carolina middle school students' raising nearly half a million dollars for firefighters to buy a new fire truck to replace one lost at the World Trade Center site.

In 2005, Earhardt moved to San Antonio, Texas, and anchored weekday morning and noon newscasts at television station KENS.

Earhardt has written three children's books (Take Heart, My Child; Through Your Eyes; and I'm So Glad You Were Born) and a memoir: The Light Within Me.

=== Fox News ===
Earhardt moved to New York City and began working at Fox News Channel in 2007. She has stated that she "did not know the first thing about politics" before she was hired by Roger Ailes to work at the network. She appeared on Hannity with her own segment called "Ainsley Across America", and has co-hosted Fox and Friends Weekend, All-American New Year's Eve, America's News Headquarters. She has appeared as a panelist on The Live Desk and Greg Gutfeld's Red Eye.

Earhardt became a co-host of Fox & Friends in 2016. President Donald Trump tweeted about the show more than 100 times in the first eight months of his presidency. Earhardt has interviewed both Trump and Vice President Mike Pence. During a 2018 interview, she praised Trump for threatening former FBI Director James Comey with alleged audio recordings, stating it "was a smart way to make sure he stayed honest" in congressional hearings. Shortly prior to the interview, Trump had withdrawn the U.S. from the Paris Climate Agreement; Earhardt asked him, Why did President [Barack] Obama [...] why did his administration think this agreement was okay for America?" In a later interview with Pence, she described the Paris Climate Agreement as "unfair" to the United States.

Earhardt defended Trump's firing of FBI Director James Comey, saying "he gets to decide who works for him. Someone who works for him who is not supportive of him, he gets rid of them." Amid the Trump administration's negotiations with Kim Jong-Un, Fox & Friends ran North Korean images of Kim Jong-Un touring industry in his country; Earhardt described the images as "very romantic". In 2017, she falsely claimed that "5.7 million ... illegal immigrants might have voted" in the 2008 election.

In May 2019, after The New York Times documented Trump's "deep financial distress" between 1985 and 1994 that included losing more money than almost any other American taxpayer, Earhardt praised Trump. She said, "It's pretty impressive, all the things that he's done in his life. It's beyond what most of us could ever achieve." Earhardt criticized "the liberal media", saying that Republicans will not run for office anymore "because they know the liberal media is going to take them down." In October 2018, after The New York Times documented how Trump obtained nearly half a billion dollars from his father, Fred Trump Sr., through "dubious tax schemes" and possible tax fraud, Earhardt accused the Times of "bashing" Trump's father.

After Trump ordered the assassination of a top Islamic Revolutionary Guard Corps general, Qasem Soleimani, citing intelligence he said necessitated it, Earhardt defended the administration against requests that the administration show the intelligence. She said, "I find it interesting that people are critical of the president's decisions, of our intelligence community's decisions, or general's decisions... Everything can't be made public." She paraphrased Secretary of State Mike Pompeo, "you just have to trust us." Previously, Earhardt had shown considerable distrust of the intelligence community during Trump's presidency; she had also advanced "deep state" conspiracy theories.

During the COVID-19 pandemic, Earhardt encouraged viewers to travel by plane, saying "it's actually the safest time to fly." Her comments contradicted guidance from the Centers for Disease Control. She criticized Democrats and the media, saying that they were making the pandemic political.

In December 2021, Earhardt drew criticism after stating on air: "It's [the Fox Christmas tree] a tree that unites us, that brings us together. It is about the Christmas spirit, it is about the holiday season, it is about Jesus, it is about Hanukkah." Her incorrect characterization of the Christmas tree as a symbol of the Jewish festival of Hanukkah gained attention on social media and corrections in the news media.

According to Eliza Relman at Business Insider, "few subjects animate [Earhardt] more than stories about alleged attacks on Christianity." When a Missouri sheriff's department was criticized for putting "In God We Trust" decals on their squad cars, Earhardt defended the sheriff's department, asking "What about the majority? I'm so tired of protecting the rights of the minority. What about the rest of the country?"

== Personal life ==
Earhardt is a practicing Christian and splits her time between Manhattan and Florida. She married her college sweetheart Kevin McKinney in April 2005; they divorced in 2009. In October 2012, Earhardt married former quarterback Will Proctor. Their daughter, Hayden, was born in November 2015. Earhardt and Proctor announced their separation in October 2018, after six years of marriage. Their divorce was finalized in 2019.

Earhardt secretly entered a relationship with fellow Fox News presenter Sean Hannity. They attended Pete Hegseth's wedding together at Trump National Golf Club Colts Neck in August 2019. During the COVID-19 pandemic, Earhardt hosted her Fox & Friends program from a remote studio in the basement of Hannity's Long Island mansion. Gabriel Sherman of Vanity Fair broke the news of their relationship in June 2020; both parties denied it at the time. On Christmas Day 2024, Earhardt and Hannity became engaged at Bethesda-by-the-Sea in Palm Beach, Florida. They were married at the same church on October 24, 2026; attendees included members of the Trump family and several prominent conservative figures. President Trump and First Lady Melania Trump hosted and attended the couple's rehearsal dinner and pre-wedding celebrations at their Mar-a-Lago residence.

== See also ==
- New Yorkers in journalism
