= Florida Young Artists Orchestra =

The Florida Young Artists Orchestra, or FYAO, is a youth orchestra serving the Orlando, Florida region. The FYAO is led by artistic director Dr. Alvaro Gomez and assistant conductors Randall Love and Sherry Pollock. Until February 2010, the FYAO was led by founding artistic director Jonathan May. The FYAO currently rehearses at the Trinity Preparatory School in Winter Park, Florida.

The Florida Young Artists Orchestra toured Austria during the summer of 1998 and was invited to participate in the Milan Cultural Festival in 2001. The FYAO has performed throughout Italy and Austria including performances in Fiesole, Cremona and at the Academy of Music at Santa Cecilia in Rome. The Florida Young Artists Orchestra was the resident ensemble at the Music Academie at Schloss-ort in Gmunden, Austria and has traveled to Vienna and Salzburg.

The FYAO performed at Carnegie Hall on June 15, 2008. Members of the Florida Young Artists Orchestra and the nearby Central Florida Youth Orchestra (Leesburg, FL) came together to form one orchestra. These 101 children (ages 14 – 18) performed three works which were commissioned especially by the FYAO. These three pieces were The Phoenix Rising by Stella Sung, Alligator Songs by Jonathan May's brother and film music composer Daniel May, and The Ponce De Leon Suite by Robert Kerr.

== Orchestras ==
The FYAO consists of several different medium-sized orchestras, each separated into both age and skill level.

- Sinfonia - Strings-only orchestra for young children (ages 6 – 12), which performs primarily level 2 and 3 music. Conducted by Sherry Pollock
- Philharmonic - An intermediate string orchestra for students ages 10–22, performing primarily level 3 and 4 music. Conducted by Randall Love
- Symphony - Conducted by Dr. Alvaro Gomez, this full symphonic orchestra is for advanced musicians ages 11–22 who perform all "original versions of standard orchestral repertoire"
- Camerata - Conducted by Dr. Alvaro Gomez, this elite group of symphony orchestra musicians perform standard chamber music repertoire

== Ensembles ==
Additionally, FYAO is linked with several smaller ensembles, most notably the Odyssey String Quartet, Sapphire String Quartet, and FYAO Brass Ensemble, which all perform at various venues independently, all performing at a single concert at the end of the year, after the Bravo! Celebration.

== Competitions and concerts ==
There are several yearly-recurring concerts and competitions (with varying music of course) by FYAO, most notably the Young Artists Virtuoso Concert, where winners of the annual concerto competition a movement from a major work for their instrument and orchestra.
