= Will Proctor =

American gridiron football player (born 1983)

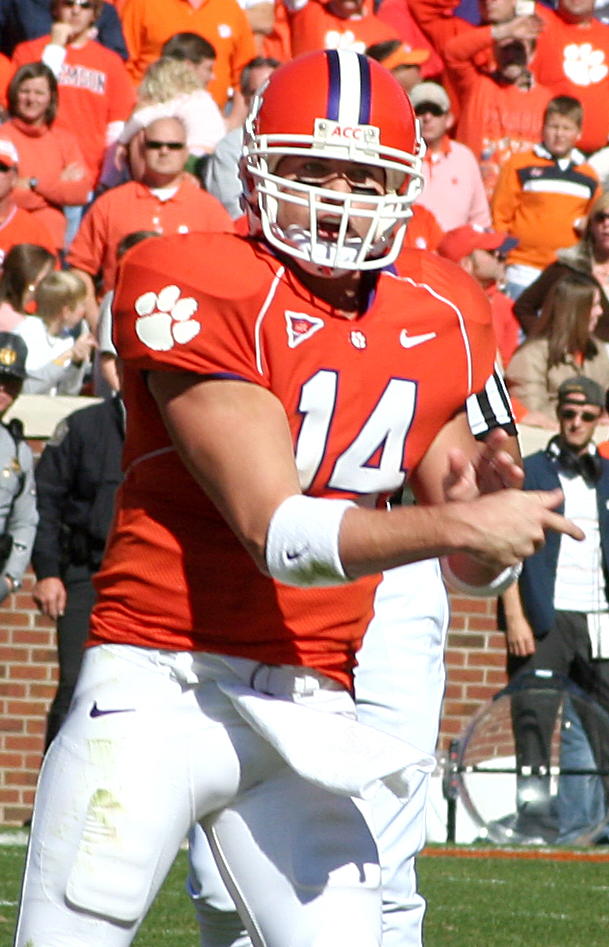
- Proctor playing for the Clemson Tigers in 2006

No. 4
- Position: Quarterback

Personal information
- Born: November 3, 1983 (age 43); Winter Park, Florida, U.S.
- Listed height: 6 ft 3 in (1.91 m)
- Listed weight: 210 lb (95 kg)

Career information
- High school: Trinity Prep (Winter Park, Florida)
- College: Clemson (2002–2006)

Career history
- 2007: Montreal Alouettes
- 2008: Calgary Stampeders

Awards and highlights
- Grey Cup champion (2008)

Career statistics
- Passing yards: 49
- TDs–INTs: 0–0
- QB rating: 289.6
- Rushing yards: 14
- Stats at CFL.ca (archive)

William Bartlett Proctor (born November 3, 1983) is an American former professional football quarterback who played two seasons in the Canadian Football League (CFL). He played college football for the Clemson Tigers.

== College career ==
At Clemson, as third-string quarterback, he saw the field in four games at wide receiver during the 2003 season. He was the backup to Charlie Whitehurst until the 2006 season. In his first start at Clemson, he recorded 232 yards of total offense against the Duke Blue Devils in 2005. In the 2006 season, Proctor completed 60% of passes.

== Professional career ==
Proctor was playing as a backup quarterback for the Montreal Alouettes of the Canadian Football League for the 2007 CFL season, and was released in the 2008 pre-season. He was then signed by the Calgary Stampeders in October 2008. In 2008, Proctor dressed for one regular-season game and both playoff contests for the Stamps. He won the Grey Cup with the Stampeders in 2008. In June 2009, Stampeders head coach/general manager John Hufnagel announced that Proctor had retired from football. He has since worked in the financial sector.

== Personal life ==
Proctor was married to Fox & Friends host Ainsley Earhardt from 2012 to 2019, with whom he has a daughter.
