= Orlando Philharmonic Orchestra =

American resident professional orchestra

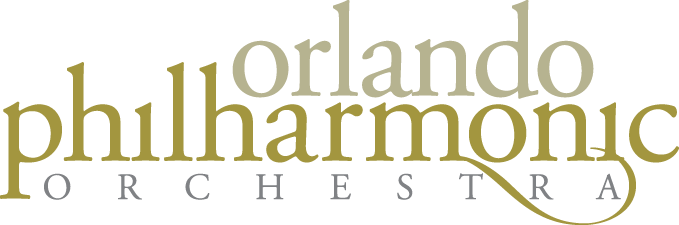

The Orlando Philharmonic Orchestra is Central Florida's resident professional orchestra, appearing in more than 125 performances each season. Founded in 1993. At over $4 million, the Orlando Philharmonic has the largest endowment of any arts institution in Central Florida. The Orlando Philharmonic entered its 29th anniversary in the 2021–2022 season, led by Eric Jacobsen in his fourth season as music director.

== History ==
The Orlando Philharmonic is Central Florida's resident professional orchestra, composed of musicians recruited from around the world.

== Programs ==
The orchestra presents several different types of programming. The Super Series, which runs September through April, comprises ten concerts, including five classical concerts and five "pops" concerts. The 2015-2016 classical series includes guest artists such as conductor JoAnn Falletta and pianist Stuart Goodyear. The pops series features music from Broadway musicals, the cinema and popular music. All super series concerts are performed at the Doctor Phillips center (Steinmetz Hall) in Orlando.

The philharmonic performs several chamber music concerts each year at The Plaza Live in Orlando as part of its Focus Series. A summer version of this series, the Sounds of Summer Series, takes place during June, July and August, featuring programs compiled by the orchestra's own musicians.

Additionally, the Orlando Philharmonic performs numerous full-orchestra outdoor fall and spring community pops concerts, performed in partnerships with municipalities throughout the region and offered free to the public.

== Opera ==
In 2010, the philharmonic performed two concert operas, Carmen and Porgy and Bess. In 2011, the orchestra performed La Bohème. In 2012, the philharmonic performed Rigoletto. The Orlando Philharmonic annually performs 30 Young People's Concerts for over 60,000 Orange, Seminole, and Volusia County Public School, private, and home school students at the Bob Carr Theater.

== Community collaboration ==
The philharmonic initiates many community collaborations. Since its inception, the orchestra has partnered with the Orlando Opera, Orlando Ballet, the Florida Symphony Youth Orchestra, Florida Young Artists Orchestra, the Orlando Museum of Art, the Orlando Science Center, Bethune-Cookman University, the University of Central Florida, Stetson University, the "Negro Spiritual" Scholarship Foundation, Mad Cow Theatre, the Bach Festival Society of Winter Park, the Orange County Regional History Center and many other area organizations.
