= Orlando Shakespeare Theater =

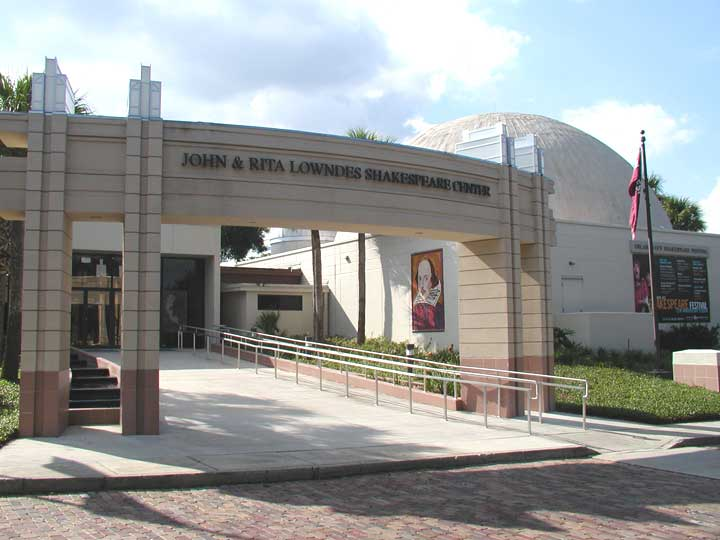
- The Orlando Shakespeare Theater, located in the Lowndes Shakespeare Center
- Formation: 1989; 37 years ago
- Type: Theatre group
- Location: 812 E. Rollins St Orlando, Florida 32803
- Website: http://www.orlandoshakes.org/

The Orlando Shakespeare Theater is a theater company based in Orlando, Florida that produces classic, contemporary, and children’s plays. The company was founded as the Orlando-UCF Shakespeare Festival and performed its first productions in 1989. It is based at the John and Rita Lowndes Shakespeare Center in Orlando's Loch Haven Park.

== Programs ==
The current season includes a Subscription Series of seven productions with a cast of AEA professional actors from around the country, a Children's Series of three productions, a weekend festival of new plays titled PlayFest, one summer Shakespeare production performed by local high school students titled The Young Company, summer camps for children, community and professional classes, and extensive teaching in K-12 schools.

== Facilities ==
The John and Rita Lowndes Shakespeare Center (home to the Orlando Shakespeare Theater) is located in Orlando-Loch Haven Park, the cultural campus that also hosts the Orlando Museum of Art, the Orlando Science Center, the Mennello Museum, and Orlando Family Stage. Convenient to downtown Orlando and I-4, the 50,000 sq ft (4,600 m^{2}) center houses the Ken and Trisha Margeson Theater (324 seats), the Marilyn and Sig Goldman Theater (118 seats), The Santos-Dantin Theater (70 seats), Mandell Studio Theater (99 seats), the Dr. Phillips Patrons Room, gift shop, catering kitchen, scenic, costume and prop shops, administrative offices, and the outdoor Darden Courtyard.

== Partnerships ==
The Orlando Shakespeare Theater has a professional, long-term partnership with the University of Central Florida.

== In popular culture ==
The 1988 Disney film Ernest Saves Christmas was filmed on location, which in the film was transformed into the fictional Orlando Children's Museum.
