= Park Maitland School =

Private school in Orlando, Florida, United States

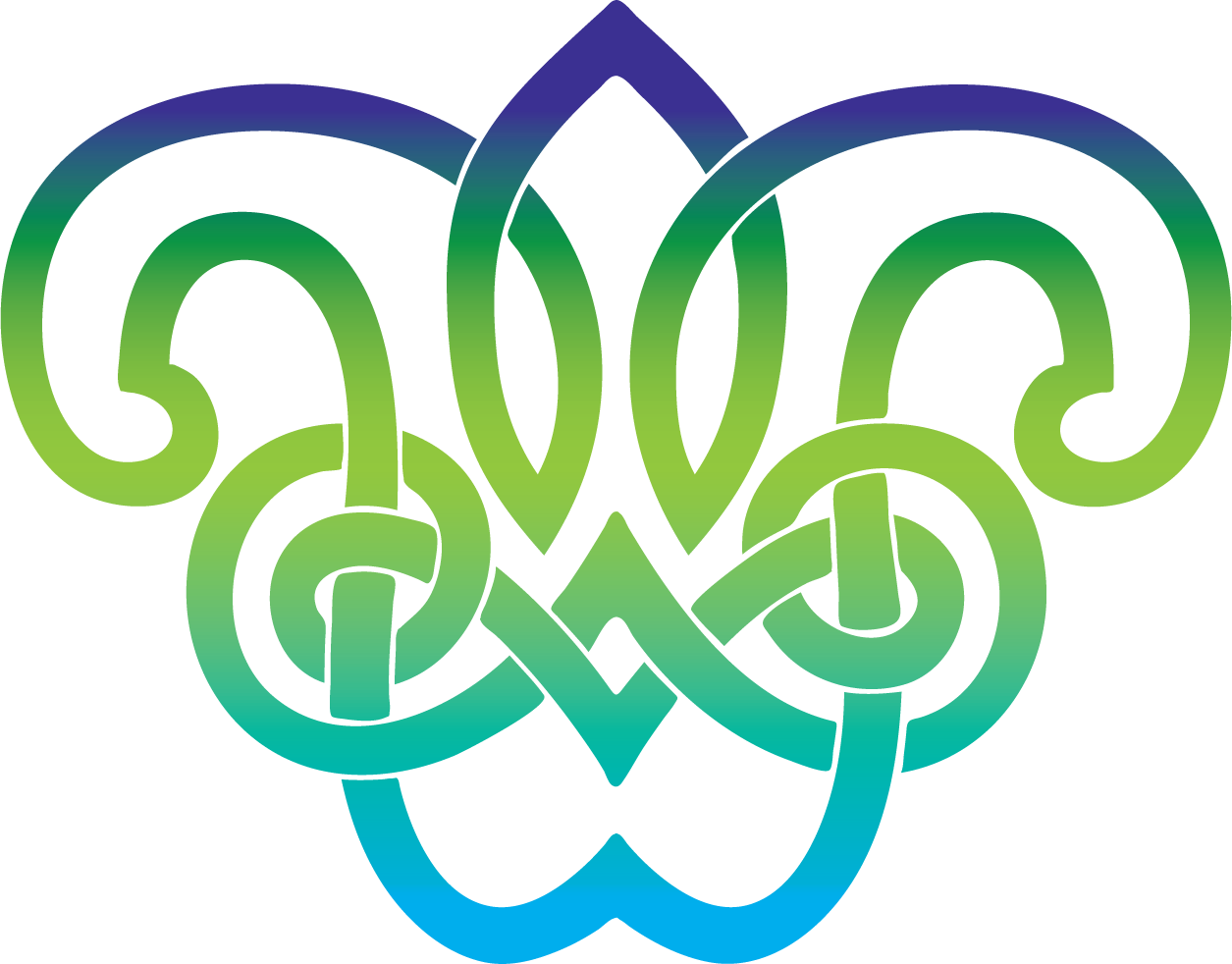

Information
- Type: Private
- Opened: 1968
- Principal: Dr. John Courson (Park Maitland South) Nicole Roman (Park Maitland Preschool)
- Head of school: Bianca Moore (Park Maitland North)
- Teaching staff: 61 (on an FTE basis)
- Grades: Toddlers-8th Grade
- Enrollment: 611 (2024-25)
- Student to teacher ratio: 10
- Colors: Green and Gold
- Team name: Eagles
- Annual tuition: $21,250
- Website: www.parkmaitland.com
- Last updated: 16 December 2024

The Park Maitland School is a private, coeducational school in Maitland, Florida. It serves children ages 2 years through 8th grade, separated into a Preschool (2 years–Pre-K), North Campus (Pre-K –8th Grade), and South Campus (1 year–5th Grade). It is "long viewed as one of Central Florida's top-rated private schools". Park Maitland's North and South campuses are accredited by Florida Council of Independent Schools.

== History ==
The Park Maitland School was founded in 1968 by Mrs. Nell Cohen. The school offered education to students Pre–K-4 through grade 6, until expanding to grades 8 and Pre–K-2 during the 2023–2024 school year.

In 2010, Park Maitland was voted a top private school for grades K-8 in the Orlando Magazine.

Park Maitland School has supported charities and fundraisers in the Central Florida region.

In 2023, Governor Ron DeSantis withheld state funding for vouchers to the school due to its alleged ties to the Chinese Communist Party. The school denied the allegations; many parents rejected the claims and condemned DeSantis. The decision was also criticized by students and alumni.

== Academics ==
The school hosts an annual 'Native American Festival' after 3rd-grade students spend six-months researching the culture and history of the indigenous peoples of Florida and are ceremonially inducted into the 'Muscogee Nation of Florida' by Florida Indian Council member Jim Sawgrass.

In 2018, Park Maitland North Campus opened an iHub that includes STEAM spaces and a media center. Park Maitland North Campus is an Apple Distinguished School.

== Notable alumni ==
- Beth Littleford
- Mandy Moore
