= Unjuried =

Art exhibition or festival where all submissions are accepted

An unjuried or open access art exhibition or festival is one where all submissions are accepted. Within theater, it is often referred to as a fringe festival, following the unjuried Edinburgh Festival Fringe.

== History ==
Traditionally gatherings have had varying degrees of inclusiveness and exclusiveness, hence broadly speaking, the notion of a "juried" or "unjuried" gathering dates to prehistory. More narrowly, the notion of an unjuried exhibition arose in response to the Paris Salon, which began in 1725 and was juried from 1748 onwards. The Salon was very influential in the western world during the period 1748–1890 as an arbiter of taste, and the revolt against its strictures was a key conflict in the development of western art. An exhibitions of works refused from the official Salon was referred to as a Salon des Refusés, which became particularly prominent from 1863 onwards, when the French government under Emperor Napoléon III funded a Salon des Refusés for the large number of rejected artworks in that year. 1884 saw the formation of the Société des Artistes Indépendants (Society of Independent Artists), whose device was Sans jury ni récompense (Without jury nor awards), and which has run unjuried art exhibits from 1884 to the present day, under the title of Salon des Indépendants (Independents Salon). The development of these rejected or unjuried exhibits was key in the development of the avant-garde in painting, particularly the École de Paris (Paris School), with the SAI being particularly prominent during the Gilded Age, until World War I.

In theater, unjuried festivals rose to prominence in the second half of the twentieth century, most prominently in the Edinburgh Festival Fringe.

== Criteria ==
Despite declaring no criteria for inclusion, some unjuried exhibits or festivals have constraints on genre. Thus, while they may accept any work of art, they may reject an object as "not art". Notoriously, Marcel Duchamp's Fountain was rejected from an unjuried art exhibition in 1917 as "not being art" – this being a stunt staged by Duchamp to challenge the conventional (even within the avant-garde) definition of "art".

== See also ==
- Fringe theatre
- Juried competition
- Salon des Refusés
- Société des Artistes Indépendants
