= The Geneva School =

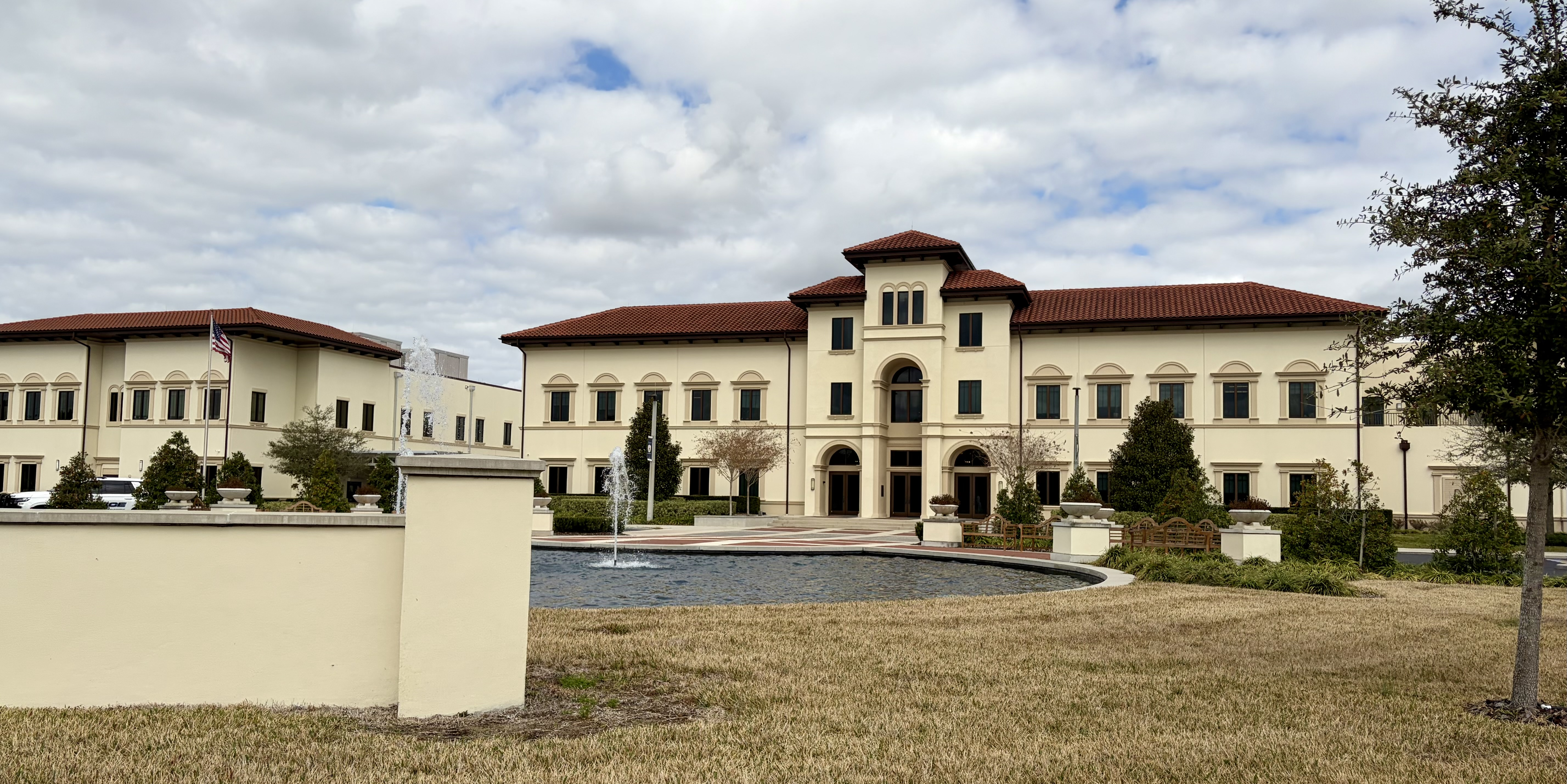
- The Geneva School's campus in Casselberry, Florida

Location
- Casselberry, Florida; United States; 28.674120°N 81.298160°W

Information
- Type: Private
- Motto: Post Tenebras Lux, After Darkness, Light
- Established: 1993
- Headmaster: Mr. Brad Ryden
- Enrollment: 660
- Campus: Suburban
- Colors: Blue and Silver
- Song: Non Nobis Domine
- Mascot: Knights
- Tuition: $8,250–$18,000 (K4–12)
- Website: genevaschool.org

The Geneva School is a private, classical, coeducational Christian day school, founded in 1993. The Geneva School is located on a 40-acre campus in Casselberry, Florida. Geneva is accredited by the Florida Council of Independent Schools. The total enrollment for 2024–2025 was 739 students.

== Academics ==
Geneva employs a Christian classical education model. This trivium model of education consists of three distinct stages: grammar, dialectic, and rhetoric.

The Grammar stage (Grades K4–6) focuses on developing students' foundational knowledge by encouraging curiosity and engagement with core academic subjects. The curriculum includes arithmetic tables, scientific formulas, biblical narratives, Latin grammar, and cultural history, covering civilizations from ancient Mesopotamia to the present day.

Dialectic (Grades 7–8) uses a student's natural inclination to question and analyze. In this investigative stage of learning, students acquire the tools of logic and critical thought to build the framework to ask meaningful questions and pursue deeper truths.

Rhetoric (Grades 9–12) teaches students how to communicate the grammar and dialectic disciplines effectively. Their confidence in how to think for themselves is built up by developing a capacity to present their views through speech and through writing.

== Athletics ==
The Geneva School athletic teams are known as the Knights. The Knights are full members of FHSAA and compete at the 2A level in most sports. TGS also has an extensive youth sports program for grammar school students.

In 2025, Geneva's softball team came runners-up in the Class 1A state championship.

== Building and expansion ==
In the fall of 2019, The Geneva School upper school (7th–12th grade) moved into the new facility in Casselberry at the same location as the state-of-the-art outdoor athletic facility which opened in 2016. The new lower school (K4-6th grade) opened adjacent to the upper school in August 2022, making it the largest dedicated private school campus in the Orlando metropolitan area.

== Notable Alumni ==
- John Candeto: Founder, Phronesis Fund
- Ryan Delk: Founder & CEO, Primer
