= Trinity Preparatory School =

Prep school in Winter Park, Florida, US

Trinity Preparatory School of Florida

Location
- Winter Park, Florida; USA; 28.611109°N 81.270761°W

Information
- Type: Private
- Motto: Latin: Ad astra per aspera (To the stars through difficulties)
- Religious affiliation: Episcopal
- Established: 1968; 58 years ago
- Founder: Rev. Canon A. Rees Hay
- Head of school: Byron M. Lawson, Jr
- Faculty: 79
- Enrollment: 845
- Student to teacher ratio: 11:1
- Campus: Suburban, 100 acres (0.40 km^{2})
- Colors: Navy; Gold; White
- Mascot: Saint
- Tuition: $27,949 (2024–25 school year)
- Website: www.trinityprep.org

Trinity Preparatory School of Florida is an independent college preparatory day-school for students in grades 6 to 12, in Central Florida, United States. The school has a campus spanning both Seminole County and Orange County with a Winter Park, Florida address. It is affiliated with the Episcopal Church and is accredited by the Florida Council of Independent Schools.

== History ==
Trinity Prep was established in 1968 by Rev. Canon A Rees Hay. The first class had 173 students and served the grades 7–12.

== Academics ==
Upper school students are required to complete 22 credits in order to graduate, in English, mathematics, foreign languages, social studies, science, fine arts, computer science, life management, and physical education.

Trinity Prep's Class of 2019 had 30 students recognized by the National Merit Scholarship as high scorers, and 17 students as National Merit semifinalists, more than any other school in Central Florida.

In 2019, Trinity Prep was voted a top private school for grades 9–12 as well as grades 6–8 in the Orlando Magazine "Best of Orlando 2019."

== Athletics ==
In 2019–20, Trinity Prep had 59 sports teams in 18 sports at the varsity, junior varsity, and middle school levels. Autumn-term teams include bowling, cross country, football, golf, swimming and diving, and volleyball. Winter-term teams include basketball and soccer. Spring teams include baseball, softball, lacrosse, tennis, track and field, and weightlifting. The Saints' traditional rival, Lake Highland Prep, has recently been replaced by other area schools that have remained in Trinity's size classification. Among these schools are The First Academy of Orlando and Holy Trinity Episcopal Academy of Melbourne.

Trinity Prep generally falls under the 2A size classification but competes in both 1A and 3A as well. Trinity Prep won the FHSAA All-Sports Award for Class 2A in 2002-03 and for Class 2A Private in 2003-04 and 2010–11. The All-Sports Award is awarded to the top-rated athletics program in each size classification in a given year.

The Boys Cross Country team has won eight state championships (1996, 2007, 2009, 2010, 2013, 2014, 2015, and 2016).

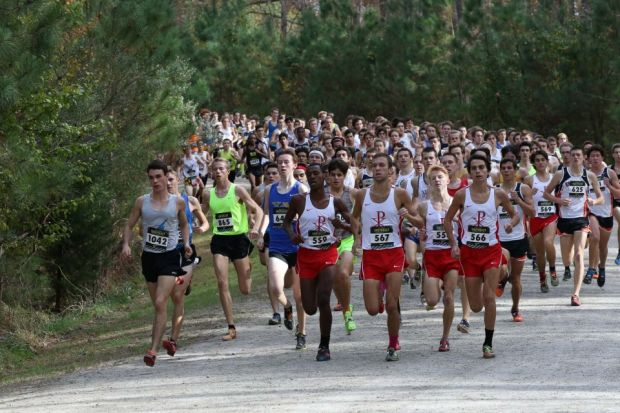
The Saints, as Avery Creek Running Club in red, Leading the Pack at NXNSE

== Extracurricular activities ==
The Trinity Voice, the school's student news publication, published articles on current events, school news, pop culture. In 2020, The Trinity Voice was named one of the seven best high school publications in Florida by the Florida Scholastic Press Association.

Trinity Prep's speech and debate team finished within the top 20 nationally in 2020, and finished 5th in the State in 2021.

== Notable alumni ==
- Winston DuBose (1973), professional soccer player
- Whit Watson (1989), Emmy Award-winning sportscaster for Golf Channel
- Pardis Sabeti (1993), Rhodes scholar, Harvard professor, computational biologist, medical geneticist and evolutionary geneticist
- Matthew L. Golsteyn (1998), U.S. Army officer charged in 2018 with murder but pardoned in 2019 by President Donald Trump
- Shyam Sankar (2000), CTO Palantir
- Will Proctor (2002), professional football player
- Jazzy Danziger (2003), poet and winner of the 2012 Brittingham Prize in Poetry
- Eric Wilbur (2003), professional football player
- Sam Saunders (2006), professional golfer and grandson of Arnold Palmer
- Denée Benton (2010), theater and television actress, currently starring in "Natasha, Pierre, & The Great Comet of 1812" on Broadway
- Hank Lebioda (2012), professional golfer
- Max Moroff (2012), professional baseball player
- Slade Cecconi (2018), professional baseball player
- Alex Balfanz, video game developer
- Mohammed Dewji, Tanzanian billionaire businessman and former politician
- Vacharaesorn Vivacharawongse, former Thai prince
