= Andrej Hoteev =

Russian pianist (1946–2021)

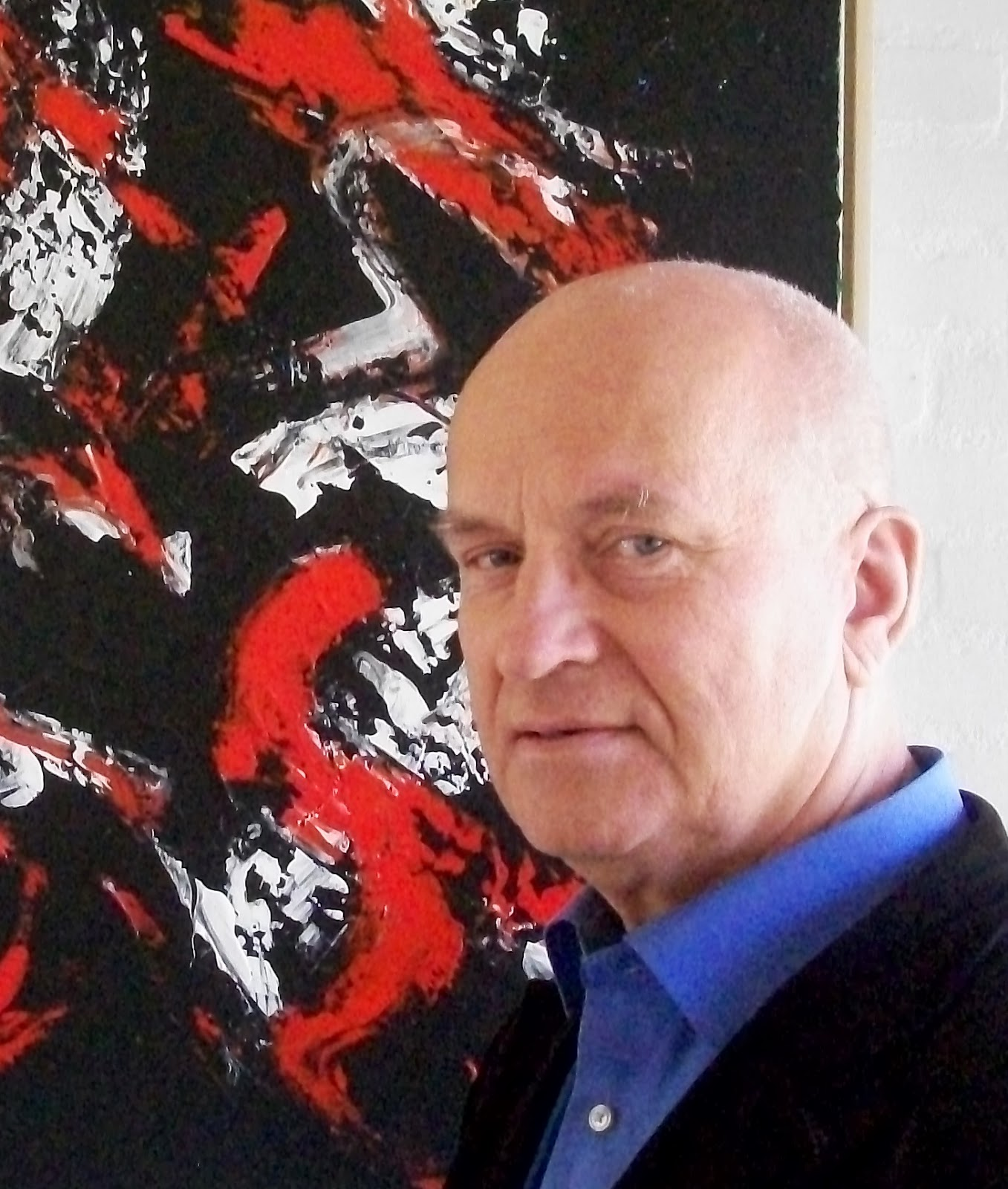
- Andrej Hoteev (2013)
- Born: 2 December 1946; Leningrad, Soviet Union
- Died: 28 November 2021 (aged 74)
- Occupation: Classical pianist
- Years active: 1983–2021

Andrej Ivanovich Hoteev (Russian: Андрей Иванович Хотеев, romanized: Andrei Chotejew; 2 December 1946 – 28 November 2021) was a Russian classical pianist.

== Early life ==
Andrej Hoteev was born in Leningrad. He studied piano at the Rimsky-Korsakov Conservatory in Saint Petersburg as well as at the Tchaikovsky Conservatory in Moscow with Lev Naumov.

== Performances ==
Hoteev gave his first concert in 1983 at the Moscow Conservatory. Other concerts in Russia followed. His encounter with Sviatoslav Richter in June 1985 at Saint Petersburg had a deep influence on Hoteev's pianistic style. After the recommendation of Valery Gergiev he had the chance to give concerts in the Netherlands at the Concertgebouw, Amsterdam and in Germany at the Schleswig-Holstein Musik Festival in 1990.

Hoteev's first European tour followed in 1993, including cities in Russia, Great Britain, Germany, Belgium and Spain. In the same year, he recorded his first CD in France. In September 1993, Hoteev played the manuscript version of Modest Mussorgsky's Pictures at an Exhibition for the first time in the UK at the Purcell Room, London. In October 1993 a concert with Hoteev and the Saint Petersburg Academic Symphony Orchestra was broadcast from the Saint Petersburg Philharmonic Hall, presenting a new version of the Piano Concerto No. 3 by Pyotr Ilyich Tchaikovsky with explanations by the pianist himself, who had rediscovered the original version with three movements after manuscripts by the composer. Also in 1993 he moved to Hamburg with his family.

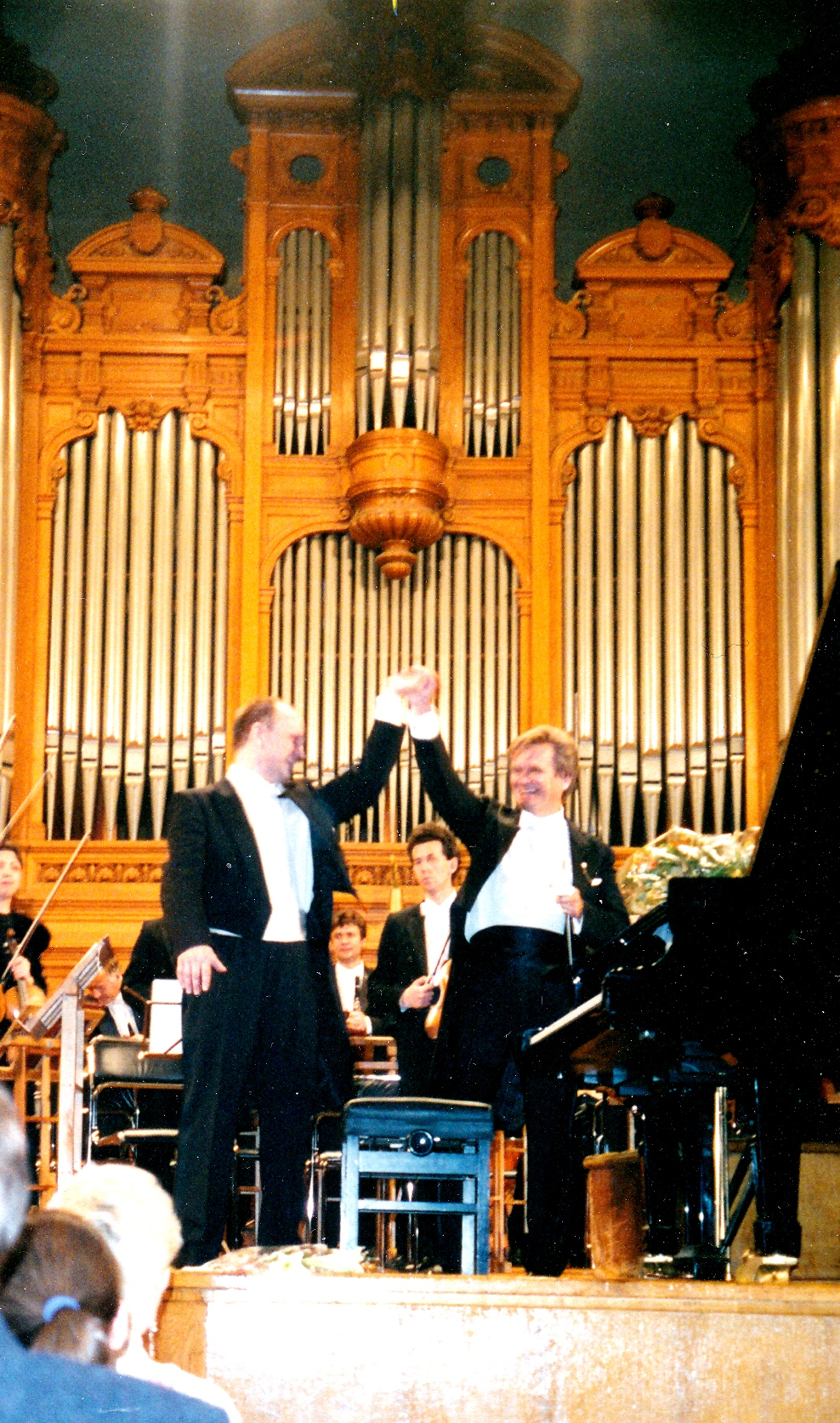
Andrej Hoteev and Vladimir Fedoseyev in Moscow 1996

Hoteev's premiere of the cycle of all three Tchaikovsky concertos in the original versions at the large hall of Moscow Conservatory as well as Tchaikovsky's Concert Fantasy for piano and orchestra, in November 1996, gained him worldwide attention and a reputation as a Tchaikovsky expert. Two years later, he presented and recorded the same program, along with the Allegro in C minor, as well as the Ungarische Zigeunerweisen by Franz Liszt and Sophie Menter in an orchestration by Tchaikovsky. He also worked with radio and TV corporations such as NDR and Deutschland Radio Berlin in Germany, VARA and VPRO Netherlands, Radio Lugano Switzerland, NHK and TBS in Japan.

In 2006, Hoteev realized a project with colored light, pictures and music at the Greater Hall of the Laeiszhalle Hamburg. As soloist accompanied by Hamburg Symphony Orchestra conducted by Andrey Boreyko he presented the authentic colour light score with Clavier à lumières of Alexander Scriabin's Prometheus: The Poem of Fire rediscovered by himself as well as the original colored light and picture scores by Wassily Kandinsky to Mussorgsky's Pictures at an Exhibition.

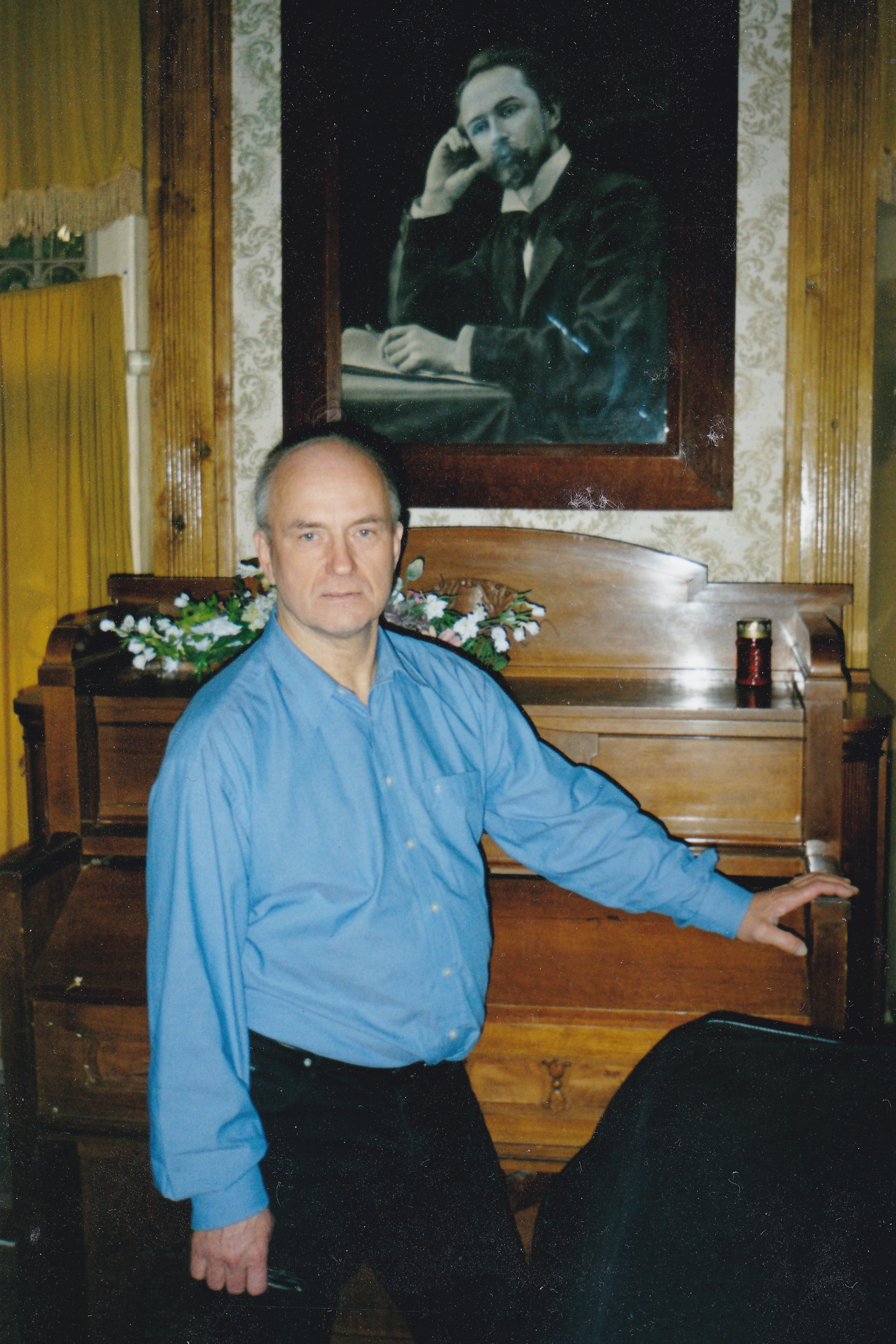
Andrej Hoteev in Scriabin museum, Moscow 2005 Prometheus-research

In 2014, as a result of his research, Andrej Hoteev presented his new CD recording of Mussorgsky's "Pictures at an Exhibition" after original manuscripts from the Russian National Library of St.Petersburg. He found numerous discrepancies compared with past editions. The most important deviations are documented with the use of illustrations from the manuscripts in the accompanying CD booklet.

In January 2015, Hoteev was awarded the "5 Diapason", France for outstanding classical music recordings.

== Personal life ==
Hoteev was married to the Russian pianist Olga Hoteeva. The couple released a CD in 2012 with 22 transcriptions by Sergei Rachmaninoff for piano for four hands after Tchaikovsky's The Sleeping Beauty. Hoteev died on 28 November 2021, age 74.

== Discography ==
=== CDs ===
- Tchaikovsky: Piano Concert No. 3/Dumka 1993, Accord
- Tchaikovsky: The four piano concertos, Hungarian Gypsy Melodies, Allegro c-moll in original version. 3 CDs, 1998, KOCH-Schwann
- Russian songs: Rachmaninoff: 10 songs; Mussorgsky: Songs and Dances of Death; Scriabin: Black Mass Sonata; with Anja Silja, soprano. Recording: Berlin, Jesus Christus Kirche, 2009, RCA Red Seal (Sony Music)
- Tchaikovsky/Rachmaninoff: Sleeping Beauty/Dornröschen. Great Ballet-Suite for piano for four hands. Andrej Hoteev and Olga Hoteeva, piano. 2012, NCA
- “Pure Mussorgsky”: Pictures at an Exhibition & Songs and Dances of Death - played from the original manuscripts; Andrej Hoteev(piano) and Elena Pankratova(soprano). Berlin classics / Edel 2014
- Wagner„Declarations of Love. Complete piano works and piano songs for Mathilde and Cosima:“Wesendonck- Sonata” Piano Sonata in a flat WWV 85 – “Sleepless” Music Letter for piano in G - “Schmachtend”Piano Elegie for Cosima in A-flat - Wesendonck Lieder 1. Version,1857/58 - “Vier weiße Lieder“,1868. Andrej Hoteev, piano; Maria Bulgakova, soprano Hänssler Classic HC16058 2017
- „Tchaikovsky.The Seasons & Dumka“:" The Seasons,12 characteristic scenes” op. 37bis and „Dumka“ op.59. Andrej Hoteev (piano) Profil-Edition Günter Hänssler PH18088 2019

=== DVDs ===
- Mussorgsky: Pictures at an Exhibition, 2001
- Prokofiev: Piano Sonata No. 6. (Op. 82), 2003
