= Carolyn Utz =

American musician, conductor and educator

Carolyn Glover Utz (1913 – March 9, 2005) was an American musician, conductor and educator. She was a bass player for the Columbus Symphony Orchestra for 30 years and was the first black member of the orchestra's predecessor, the Columbus Philharmonic Orchestra.

== Biography ==
Carolyn Glover was born in 1913 in Columbus, Ohio, the eldest daughter of college graduate Edward Glover and Jessie F. Stephens Glover, the first black woman to graduate from Ohio State University. She earned both her bachelor's and master's degrees from Ohio State University (OSU). She taught at several colleges after graduating from OSU, including at North Carolina State College, Kentucky State College, and Edward Waters College.

In 1944, Utz was a candidate for the Columbus Philharmonic Orchestra. She auditioned with Izler Solomon, who was looking to hire black musicians. Utz, on bass, became the first African-American member of the orchestra and was, at the time, the only black person working for an orchestra of its size in the country. Utz performed with the orchestra, which later became the Columbus Symphony Orchestra for 30 years. From 1974 to 1991, she was the conductor of the Top Teens Orchestra.

Utz was a member of Alpha Kappa Alpha. She was inducted into the Chillicothe chapter of the Top Ladies of Distinction in 1984. In 1988, she was inducted into the Ohio Women's Hall of Fame. She was inducted into the Senior Musicians Hall of Fame in 1996.

Utz died on March 9, 2005, at the age of 91.
