= Old National Centre =

Performing arts center in Indianapolis, Indiana, US

- Murat Theatre
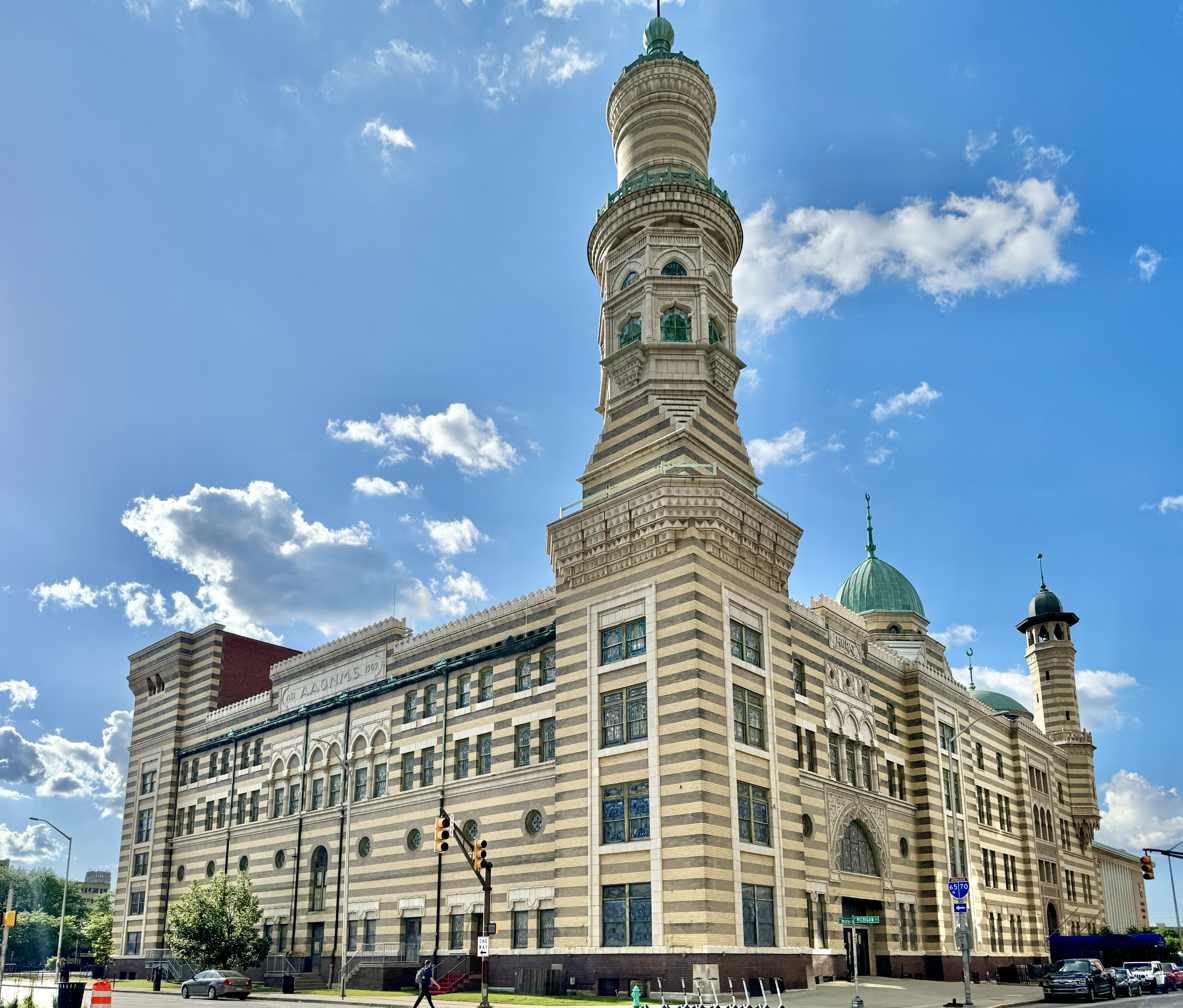
- Old National Centre in 2025
- Interactive map of Old National Centre
- Former names: Murat Shrine Temple; Murat Shrine Center
- Address: 502 N. New Jersey St. Indianapolis, Indiana; United States
- Coordinates: 39°46′27″N 86°9′4″W
- Owner: Murat Shriners of the Ancient Arabic Order of the Nobles of the Mystic Shrine
- Operator: Live Nation
- Capacity: 2,500 (Murat Theatre); 2,000 (Egyptian Room); 600 (Corinthian Hall)
- Current use: music venue

Construction
- Opened: 1909
- Architect: Oscar D. Bohlen

Website
- www.oldnationalcentre.com

The Old National Centre, formerly known as the Murat Shrine Temple and the Murat Shrine Center, is located at North and New Jersey streets in Indianapolis, Indiana, and is owned by the Murat Shriners of the Ancient Arabic Order of the Nobles of the Mystic Shrine. The theater portion of the building is now known as the Murat Theatre at Old National Centre or simply the Murat Theatre and houses the oldest extant stage house in downtown Indianapolis. It is the only Shrine Center in the world with a name of French origin and is the largest Shrine Center in North America.

== History ==
In 1882, five Freemasons wanted a Shrine organization in Indianapolis. They joined the Shrine Temple at Cincinnati, Ohio, and had that temple's help in establishing an Indianapolis temple. The local organization of the Shrine, called the Indianapolis Shriners, was given its charter on June 4, 1884. The first potentate was John T. Brush, who served as such from 1884 to 1897. Lew Wallace and Thomas Taggart were among their first Ceremonial Class, held in 1885. By the end of the first year, there were 105 members. The Indianapolis Valley of Scottish Rite gave them the Townsley and Wiggans "Pork House" for their meetings.

The Murat Temple was built in 1909 by the William P. Jungclaus Company using the designs of Murat Shriner Oscar D. Bohlen, with Middle Eastern and Egyptian stylings that were fitting for a building intended for Shriners. Its namesake is the Nubian Desert oasis Bir Murat, which was named for the Frenchman Joachim Murat, one of Napoleon's generals in his Egyptian campaign.

The Murat Shrine gave the Indianapolis Zoo its first camel and established the 500 Festival Parade.

The Murat Shrine is primarily known in Indianapolis for its theater, which was built in 1910. In its early days it featured Broadway plays and even a 1932 speech by Winston Churchill. Between 1948 and 1963, it was the only road show venue in Indianapolis. Before Clowes Memorial Hall opened in 1963, it was the home of the Indianapolis Symphony Orchestra; the orchestra survived the Great Depression due only to the nominal fee the Temple charged the orchestra for using the theater. The orchestra made recordings with Fabien Sevitzky in the theater for RCA Victor between 1941 and 1953. The Indianapolis Opera Company briefly used the facility during the 1980s.

In 1984, the Murat Shriners had the second-largest membership of all Shrine temples in the world. In 1988, a fire broke out in the 1968 addition, injuring 15 firefighters when a portion of the addition collapsed. However, there was relatively little damage to the structure.

== Construction ==
The edifice is themed after Moorish mosques found in the Middle East and Egypt. Features of the building include stained-glass windows, terra cotta trim, minarets, and brown and yellow brick banding. A 208-foot (63 m) tall tower is at the southeast corner. An addition to the temple was designed to blend with the existing structure. The Egyptian-themed auditorium, added as part of the 1922 addition, had already been planned before the discovery of the 18th dynasty Pharaoh Tutankhamun's tomb, which coincided with the opening of the auditorium.

== Facilities ==
The main sections of Murat Shrine are the 2,000-seat concert hall and the 2,500-seat performing arts theater. Today, there are nine areas for hosting events. The Egyptian Room can hold 2,000 people for a standing cocktail reception. The smaller areas are the Corinthian Hall, the Corinthian Annex, the Corinthian Meeting Room, the Great Hall, the Imperial Lounge (formerly the "Crowne Room"), and various lobby areas.

== Concerts ==
The Old National Centre has hosted numerous concerts with bands such as Babymetal, Elle King, Huddy, Pennywise, Mitski, State Champs and Sierra Ferrell.

== See also ==
- List of music venues in the United States
- List of attractions and events in Indianapolis
- List of tallest buildings in Indianapolis § Other structures
- List of Masonic buildings in Indiana
- Moorish Revival architecture
- House of Blues
