= Ungarische Zigeunerweisen =

Ungarische Zigeunerweisen (Konzert im ungarischen Stil), Hungarian Gypsy Melodies (Concerto in the Hungarian Style), is a single-movement work for piano and orchestra of about 17 minutes' duration by Sophie Menter (renowned 19th-century pianist and Franz Liszt's favourite female student). The work was written in 1885 (with possible help from Liszt), orchestrated by Pyotr Ilyich Tchaikovsky in 1892, and first performed by Menter (with Tchaikovsky conducting) in 1893.

The work is listed in Liszt's catalogue as S.714 (recently renumbered as S.126a) on account of his possible involvement. It is not known whether Tchaikovsky played any part in the actual composition, but towards the coda there is a harmonic sequence very familiar from Tchaikovsky's concertos.

== History ==
The history of the work is clouded with uncertainties. What is known is that Tchaikovsky, while staying with Menter in Austria (from 22 September 1892 [O.S. 10 September] to 2 October 1892 [O.S. 20 September]) at Menter's request prepared a score for piano and orchestra from material which she provided. The score was signed by Tchaikovsky on 2 October 1892 [O.S. 20 September] at Menter's castle Itter Castle. Tchaikovsky conducted Menter in the premiere of the work in Odessa on 4 February 1893 [O.S. 23 January]. However the publication of that score was not seen through the press by Tchaikovsky (who died ten months later), and the published score and parts require a good deal of common-sense correction.

What Tchaikovsky worked from has not been preserved, but it seems to have been some kind of short score. The uncertainty is whether Sophie Menter composed the work, or whether Liszt did, or whether Menter took something to Liszt which he then got into shape for her (in the period of exactly two days in which he is known to have worked at Menter's castle in 1885). August Göllerich mentions the work in his diary and suggests that Liszt would have had trouble completing it (failing eyesight and poor health being likely primary reasons; not wishing to write a virtuoso piece in a style which he had long abandoned no doubt being another). Liszt's letter to Menter dated 3 August 1885 tells her that the "Sophie Menter Concerto" is begun and that he would complete it at Schloss Itter. At this remove it cannot be established whether the work (referred to as a Concerto in the Hungarian Style) is the present piece, but it seems very likely.

One theory that has been advanced is that Liszt instructed Menter to take the piece to her friend Tchaikovsky for orchestration, but not to mention his (Liszt's) name so that Liszt's composership of the work could be hidden from Tchaikovsky (who did not especially admire Liszt). Tchaikovsky once wrote "[Liszt's] music leaves me completely cold", and he was not pleased with Liszt's piano transcription of his Polonaise from the opera Eugene Onegin.

== Recordings ==
- Cyprien Katsaris recorded the work with Eugene Ormandy in 1981.
- Leslie Howard recorded the work with Karl Anton Rickenbacher in 1998.
- Andrej Hoteev recorded the work with Vladimir Fedoseyev KOCH-Schwann “The 4 Piano Concerti / Bohemian Melodies / Allegro C”1998.

== See also ==
- Classical music written in collaboration
