= Bern Symphony Orchestra =

Swiss orchestra

- Orchestra
- Founded: 1877; 148 years ago
- Location: Bern, Switzerland
- Concert hall: Kursaal
- Principal conductor: Krzysztof Urbański
- Website: Official website

The Bern Symphony Orchestra (Berner Symphonie-Orchester) is a Swiss orchestra based in Bern. The orchestra primarily gives concerts at the Kursaal in Bern, and also acts as the orchestra of the Bern Theatre, for opera and dance performances. The orchestra is under the auspices of the Stiftung Berner Symphonieorchester, and receives government funding from the federal government of Switzerland and the canton and city of Bern.

== History ==
The orchestra was founded in 1877. Recent chief conductors have included Dmitri Kitajenko (1991–2004), Andrey Boreyko (2004–2010), and Mario Venzago (2010–2021). In September 2023, the orchestra announced the appointment of Krzysztof Urbański as its next chief conductor, effective with the 2024–2025 season, with an initial contract of three seasons.

== Chief conductors ==
- Adolf Reichel (1877-1884)
- Karl Munzinger (1884–1909)
- Fritz Brun (1909–1941)
- Luc Balmer (1941–1964)
- Paul Kletzki (1964–1968)
- Charles Dutoit (1968–1978)
- Gustav Kuhn (1979–1983)
- Peter Maag (1984–1991)
- Dmitri Kitajenko (1991–2004)
- Andrey Boreyko (2004–2010)
- Mario Venzago (2010–2021)
- Krzysztof Urbański (2024–present)
