= Concert Fantasia (Tchaikovsky) =

Piano concerto by Tchaikovsky

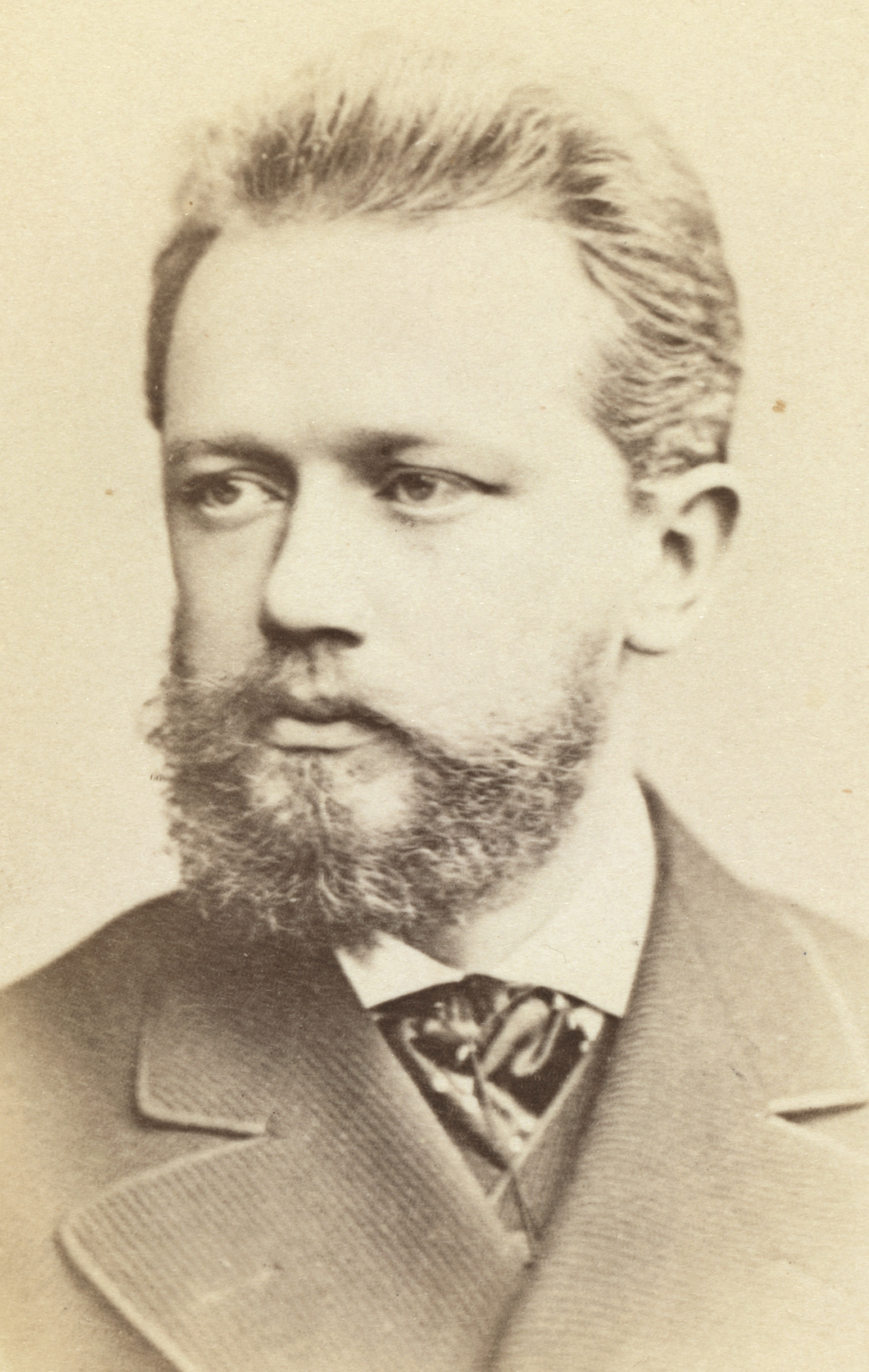
Pyotr Ilyich Tchaikovsky, c. 1880

The Concert Fantasia in G major, Op. 56, for piano and orchestra, was written by Pyotr Ilyich Tchaikovsky between June and October 1884. It was premiered in Moscow on 6 March [O.S. 22 February] 1885, with Sergei Taneyev as soloist and Max Erdmannsdörfer conducting. The Concert Fantasia received many performances in the first 20 years of its existence. It then disappeared from the repertoire and lay virtually unperformed for many years, but underwent a revival in the latter part of the 20th century.

== Structure ==
This work is written in two movements and lasts approximately 30 minutes.

1. Quasi rondo: Andante mosso
2. Contrastes

=== I. Quasi rondo: Andante mosso ===
The quasi part of the title for this movement describes a formal layout in which musical material for a rondo appears only once then returns at the end, after a single episode. The playful character of the two themes presented may have justified in the composer's mind an affinity with the sparkling character classical rondo finales. Other than this, there is nothing connecting them with usual rondo practice. Nevertheless, Tchaikovsky succeeds in developing his ideas originally within the demands of piano virtuosity and orchestral accompaniment.

=== II. Contrastes ===
Like the opening movement, this one poses a formal problem, albeit an uncommon one, then solves it simply and well. Beginning as a cadenza for piano solo, the movement contrasts a slow, melodic opening theme (quickly counterpointed by a solo cello) and a quicker, dance-like second theme alternate, contrast and compete against one another, with very lively results, leading into the final section without a break. These very extensive sections take the place of slow movement and finale for a conventional concerto. The tempo indications are Andante cantabile – Molto vivace – Vivacissimo – Allegro moderato – Vivacissimo – Molto più tranquillo – Vivace.

Tchaikovsky had voiced his dislike for the sound of piano and orchestra while writing his Second Piano Concerto with his isolating the soloist from the orchestra as much as possible. Tchaikovsky scholar David Brown notes that the middle section of the quasi Rondo of the Fantasia, written for piano solo, "was the logical goal toward which this precedent had pointed". This gives the section the appearance of a cadenza while actually being based on new material. This cadenza substitutes for the development section in sonata form.

== Instrumentation ==
The Fantasia is scored for piano solo plus the following instruments.

Woodwinds

3 flutes
2 oboes
2 clarinets in A
2 bassoons

Brass

4 horns in F
2 trumpets in D
3 trombones

Percussion

timpani

glockenspiel
tambourine

Strings

violins I
violins II
violas
cellos
double basses

== Overview ==
=== Two works, one source ===
Tchaikovsky returned from abroad at the beginning of March 1884, determined to spend the spring months with his sister at Kamenka. This trip was delayed by urgent modifications to his opera Mazeppa. Tchaikovsky wrote to Nadezhda von Meck from St. Petersburg on 13 March 1884, "I am feeling a surge of energy, and an impatience to set about something new " But Tchaikovsky did not manage to start any new work in Saint Petersburg. Only after arriving at Kamenka on 12 April did Tchaikovsky set to work.

Tchaikovsky was uncertain initially what type of composition he would write. Captivated by the playing of the famed Liszt pupil Eugen d'Albert, who had given concerts in Moscow during the 1883/84 season, his thoughts turned to a new piano concerto. Nonetheless, he wrote in his diary for 13 April 1884, "I stopped playing around and came up with something new. Hit upon an idea for a concerto for piano, but it still sounded too poor and unoriginal". Progress, at least in the composer's view, did not improve over time. On 17 and 18 April, Tchaikovsky wandered in the Trostianka woods and noted down, in his own words: "wretched ideas."

In June, after completing the sketches and piano arrangement of what would become the Third Orchestral Suite while staying at Grankino, Tchaikovsky returned to composing the Concert Fantasia. He now included Contrastes, the rejected first movement of the suite, as the second movement of the Fantasia. This was surprising considering the amount of grief its writing had caused him when he originally conceived it for the Third Suite. Though Tchaikovsky apparently could not keep his hands off this music, he still harboured doubts about it. At the end of the Quasi rondo opening movement, he added an optional coda for the soloist which was both technically showy and rhetorically empty. This alternative cadenza was to be used in case Contrastes was omitted in performance.

=== First performance ===
During October and November the Concert Fantasia was rapidly engraved, since it had to be ready for a concert of the Russian Musical Society in December, where Taneyev would premiere it. This performance, scheduled for 15 December 1884, was delayed owing to the indisposition of the conductor, Max Erdmannsdörfer. The concert took place on 22 February 1885 at the tenth symphony concert of the Russian Musical Society in Moscow. Taneyev was soloist, with Erdmannsdörfer conducting.

Tchaikovsky, who attended the concert, wrote to Modest on 25 February, "I heard a superb performance of the Fantasia by Taneyev and the orchestra, with which I was delighted. It had great success with the public." In St. Petersburg, the Concert Fantasia was performed for the first time on 4 April 1886 in the tenth symphony concert of the Russian Musical Society, conducted by Hans von Bülow and with Taneyev as soloist.

The Concert Fantasia was published by P. Jurgenson. Arrangements for four pianos and two hands were brought out in December 1884, the orchestral parts in January 1885, and the full score in March 1893. The arrangement of the Fantasia was printed with a dedication to Anna Yesipova, and the full score to Sophie Menter.

== Analysis ==
=== I. Quasi rondo: Andante mosso ===
The first movement of the fantasia, Quasi Rondo, is purely decorative in form and moderately eloquent and emotional in content. This movement is not a true rondo. It tries to approximate rondo form by beginning and ending with an extensive section which could be called a principal rondo subject. However, these two statements also have a second theme. The first time this theme appears, it is in the key of the dominant; the second time, it appears in the tonic. This order of appearance is more like the two subjects in a regular sonata movement.

While Quasi sonata might have proved a more fitting title, what actually matters here is that the music is a manner of charm, elegant craftsmanship and a high entertainment value. The main theme is developed playfully, almost in the vein of a fairy-tale ballet. The solo part is written into the music so that it uses virtuosity for musical purposes without conspicuous display. With the second theme, it is the piano and not the orchestra that carries and develops it.

The middle section, which begins with a long, elaborate solo passage, is episodic. It employs two new melodic ideas, expansive in themselves and even more luxuriantly developed. The orchestra stays silent during this long interlude. When it enters for the recapitulation, the music proceeds much as it did before, except for a new transition so the second subject can remain in the tonic and allow the movement to close on the tonic.

=== II. Contrastes ===
Contrastes is both an attractive and characteristic piece — so much so that it is hard for some critics to believe Tchaikovsky did not like this piece and offered an alternative to it. Two main themes predominate, one fast, the other slow. They are shown as contrasts not just one by one in the order of sonata first and second subjects, but often simultaneously and in varying ways. The piece could be considered a classic solution in thematic telescoping. The only qualm is that the quick theme can seem to lack spontaneity, as though it had been over-engineered for its role in this movement.

One important note is that the counterpoint for solo cello added to the slow tune being played by the piano is not the contrasting idea to which the title of the piece refers. It is merely an episode, Neither is the quiet melody that follows over an accompaniment embodying one of those inner pedal points which are a characteristic trick of Tchaikovsky's musical style. (The trick being mentioned is that of two alternating notes which go on for some time while the corresponding harmony changes. This happens in the finale of the Fifth Symphony.)

The first hint that something in a new, quick rhythm is going to be contrasted with the slow theme is when the soloist plays rapid ascending scales to its restatement by the oboe. These develop into quicker arpeggios. Follow these is a cleverly contrived transition where the arpeggios act as though mutual friends, introducing the two different rhythmic elements to each other in a passage where these patterns not meet but overlap.

== Legacy ==
Tchaikovsky biographer David Brown commented, "[The Concert Fantasia's] crippling weakness is that it contains not one really strong idea, yet its very original structure suffices to show that Tchaikovsky was concerned to fashion something more than a mere showpiece to gratify a virtuoso pianist or inflame a lionizing audience". He adds, "For all its melodic shortcomings, the Concert Fantasia has some engaging qualities and a structural freshness which should win it the occasional hearing".

== Recordings ==
One of its earliest modern-day champions was Noel Mewton-Wood, who recorded it in 1951, with an orchestra conducted by Walter Goehr.

Later recordings include:

- Igor Ardašev with the Prague Symphony Orchestra conducted by Leoš Svárovský
- Peter Donohoe with the Bournemouth Symphony Orchestra conducted by Rudolf Barshai
- Bernd Glemser with the Polish National Radio Symphony Orchestra conducted by Antoni Wit
- Werner Haas with the Monte Carlo National Opera Orchestra conducted by Eliahu Inbal
- Stephen Hough with the Minnesota Orchestra conducted by Osmo Vänskä
- Tatiana Nikolayeva with the USSR Symphony Orchestra, conducted by Kirill Kondrashin
- Květa Novotná with the Prague Radio Symphony Orchestra conducted by Jaroslav Soukup
- Mikhail Pletnev with the Philharmonia Orchestra conducted by Vladimir Fedoseyev
- Michael Ponti with the Prague Symphony Orchestra conducted by Richard Kapp
- Konstantin Scherbakov with Russian Philharmonic Orchestra conducted by Dmitri Yablonsky
- Dimitris Sgouros with the London Philharmonic Orchestra conducted by Walter Weller.
- Andrej Hoteev with the Tchaikovsky Symphony Orchestra conducted by Vladimir Fedoseyev.

== See also ==
- Piano Concerto No. 1 (Tchaikovsky)
- Piano Concerto No. 2 (Tchaikovsky)
- Piano Concerto No. 3 (Tchaikovsky)
