= Siciliani =

Siciliani is an Italian surname. Notable people with the surname include:

- Alessandro Siciliani (born 1952, Italian conductor
- Domenico Siciliani (1879–1938), Italian general
- Fabio Siciliani (born 1981), Italian kickboxer
- Griselda Siciliani (born 1978), Argentine actress
- Leticia Siciliani (born 1992), Argentine actress
- Tommaso Siciliani (1882–1964), Italian politician

== See also ==
- Sicily
- Sicilians
