= Krzysztof Urbański =

Polish conductor and composer

Krzysztof Urbański (born 17 October 1982, Pabianice, Poland) is a Polish conductor and composer.

== Biography ==
Urbański studied conducting at the Fryderyk Chopin University of Music in Warsaw, where his teachers included Antoni Wit, who one year after leaving this position considered him as the best of the fifteen disciples he had at the institution. In 2007, he won First Prize of the Prague Spring International Conducting Competition, and also graduated from the Chopin Music Academy, Warsaw in the same year. He subsequently served as an assistant conductor to the Warsaw Philharmonic Orchestra, from 2007 to 2009.

In September 2009, Urbański made his first guest-conducting appearance with the Trondheim Symphony Orchestra. That same month, the orchestra named him its next chief conductor, effective with the 2010–2011 season, with an initial contract of three years. Following an extension of his initial contract for another two years to 2015, in May 2014, his Trondheim contract was further extended to 2017. He concluded his Trondheim tenure at the close of the 2016–2017 season. From 2015 to 2021, Urbański served as principal guest conductor of the NDR Elbphilharmonie Orchestra.

Outside of Europe, in April 2010, Urbański first guest-conducted the Indianapolis Symphony Orchestra (ISO). He was subsequently engaged for a return appearance in June 2010 at the orchestra's summer series, "Symphony on the Prairie". Based on these two appearances, the ISO named Urbański its 7th music director, effective 1 September 2011, with an initial contract of four years. In parallel, the Jacobs School of Music at Indiana University Bloomington appointed Urbański as an adjunct professor of music, with a focus on orchestral conducting, effective with the 2011–2012 academic year. In September 2013, the ISO announced the extension of Urbański's contract as music director through the 2017–2018 season. Urbanski concluded his tenure as its music director at the close of the 2020–2021 season.

In April 2013, Urbański became principal guest conductor of the Tokyo Symphony Orchestra, with an initial contract of three years. In November 2022, he was appointed principal guest conductor of the Orchestra della Svizzera Italiana. In September 2023, the Bern Symphony Orchestra announced the appointment of Urbański as its next chief conductor, effective with the 2024–2025 season, with an initial contract of three seasons.

In June 2024, the Warsaw National Philharmonic Orchestra announced the appointment of Urbański as its next artistic director, effective with the 2024–2025 season, with an initial contract of four years. This appointment was initially reported in January 2024, with a different contract duration, since revised.

Cultural offices
Preceded by Eivind Aadland	Chief Conductor, Trondheim Symphony Orchestra; 2010–2017	Succeeded by Han-na Chang
Preceded by Mario Venzago	Music Director, Indianapolis Symphony Orchestra; 2011–2021	Succeeded by Jun Märkl
Preceded by Mario Venzago	Chief Conductor, Bern Symphony Orchestra; 2024–present	Succeeded by incumbent
Preceded by Andrey Boreyko	Music Director, Warsaw National Philharmonic Orchestra; 2024–present	Succeeded by incumbent
