= Prometheus: The Poem of Fire =

Tone poem by Alexander Scriabin

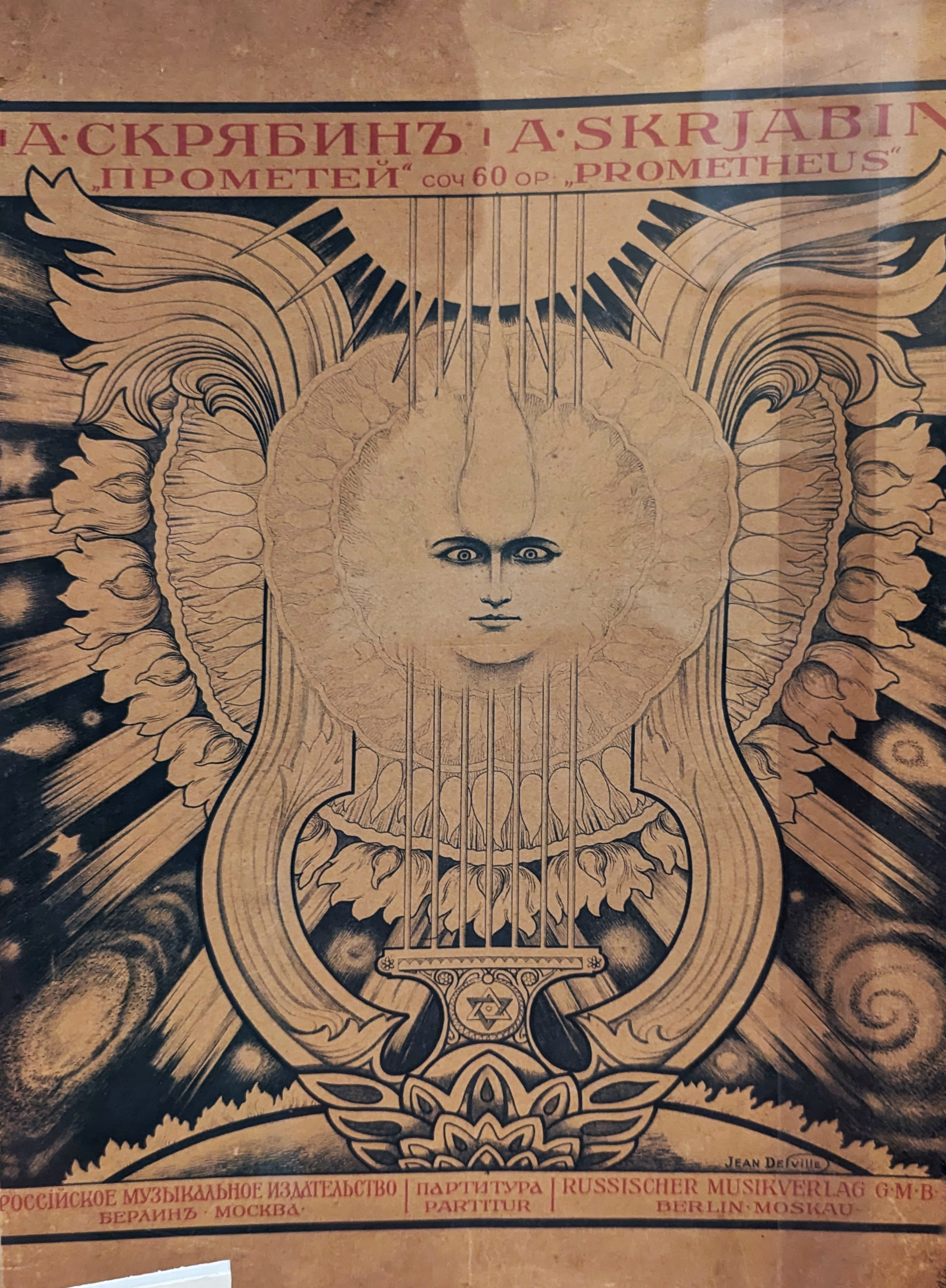
Cover of sheet music, designed by Jean Delville, for Prometheus: The Poem of Fire, Op. 60, 1911

Prometheus: The Poem of Fire, Op. 60 (1910), is a tone poem by the Russian composer Alexander Scriabin for piano, orchestra, optional choir, and clavier à lumières or "Chromola" (a color organ invented by Preston Millar, in fact rarely featured in performances of the piece, including those during Scriabin's lifetime). Prometheus is only loosely based on the myth of Prometheus. It premiered in Moscow on 2 March 1911. A typical performance lasts about 20 minutes.

== Structure ==
The music is complex and triadic only in an idiosyncratic sense, based almost entirely around various inversions and transpositions of Scriabin's matrix sonority: A D♯ G C♯ F♯ B. Sabaneyev referred to this chord, which opens the work in an eerily static fashion, as the "chord of Prometheus". It has subsequently become known as the "mystic chord". But after unrelieved dissonance throughout, the symphonic poem ends with a resplendent F-sharp major triad, the only conventionally consonant sonority in the entire composition.

== Color organ ==
The part for color organ is notated on a staff of its own, in treble clef at the top of the score, and consists of two parts: one changes with the harmony, and always goes to the root note of the prevailing harmony, and thus produces the color Scriabin associated with each key; the other consists of much longer notes sustained through many bars, and does not appear to be related to the harmony (or therefore to the first part), but for the most part slowly rises up the scale a whole-tone at a time, the changes being several pages of score apart, or a minute or two apart. It is not clear what relationship this part has to the first part, or to the music as a whole. The score does not explain how two different colors are to be presented at the same time during a performance. This color organ part also contains three parts briefly at one point in the score (bars 305-308, right before rehearsal 30).

Sources differ on what Scriabin's intentions were for the realization of the color organ part: many state that the colors were meant to be shown on a screen in front of the audience; but others say that the colors were intended to flood the entire concert hall and that showing them on a screen was merely the compromise adopted after flooding the concert hall was found impossible or impracticable.

The score itself contains no indications about how this is meant to be handled; however, a 1913 hand-annotated score manuscript preserved in the Bibliothèque nationale de France contains explicit handwritten directives by Scriabin regarding the light indications (Luce) and color transitions. A transcription and analysis of these directives, edited by Guigla Katsarava, was published in 2026 and made available on IMSLP.

== Scoring ==
The work is scored for the following instruments.

Woodwinds
3 flutes
piccolo
3 oboes
English horn
3 clarinets
bass clarinet
3 bassoons
contrabassoon
Brass
8 horns
5 trumpets
3 trombones
tuba

Percussion
timpani

glockenspiel
tubular bells
cymbals
tam-tam
triangle
bass drum
Keyboard
clavier à lumières (ad lib)
celesta
piano solo
organ

Strings
2 harps

violin I
violin II
violas
cellos
double basses

Voice
chorus (ad lib)

== Notable performances ==
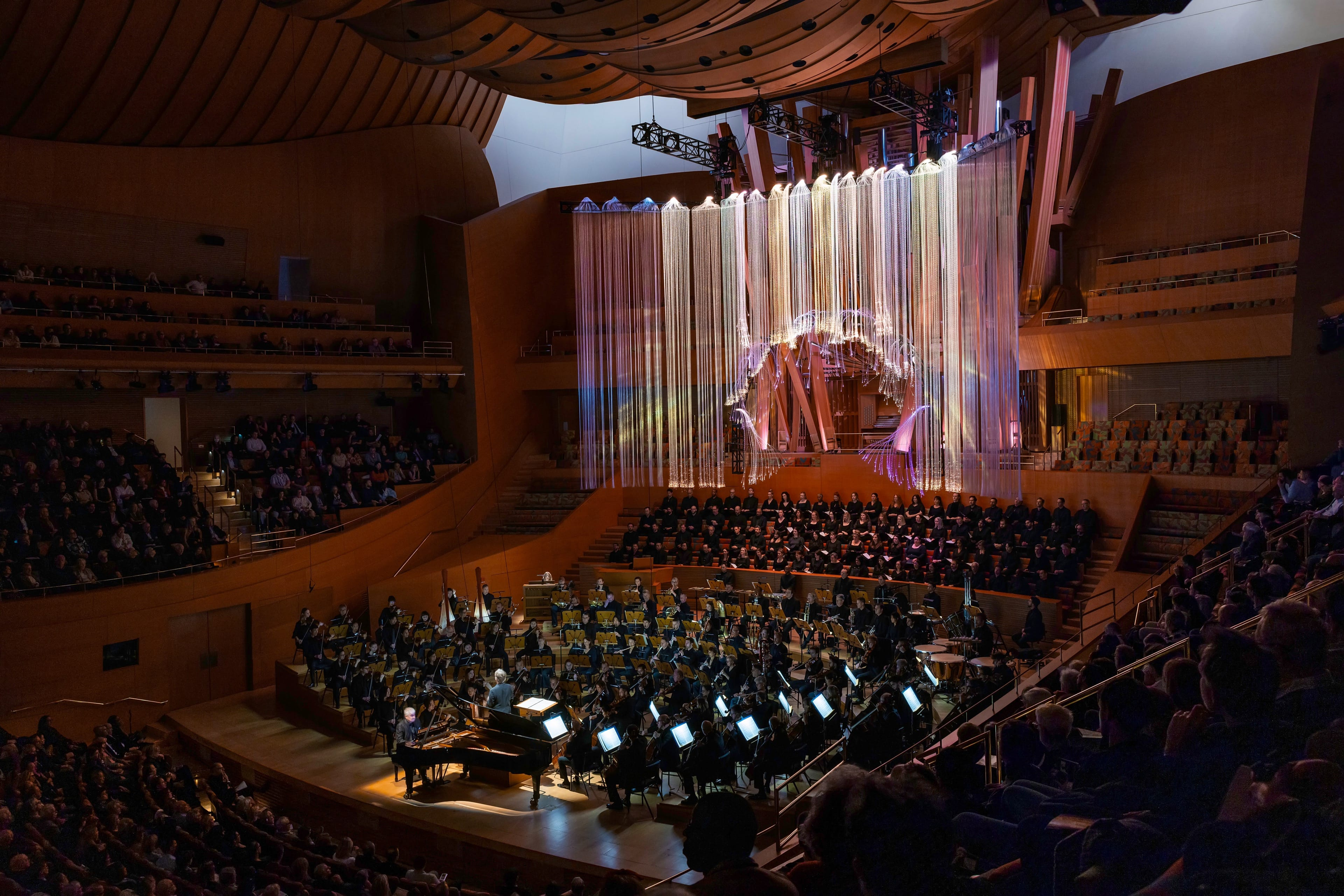
The Los Angeles Philharmonic performing Prometheus: The Poem of Fire in the Walt Disney Concert Hall, featuring a light installation by Grimanesa Amorós.

The premiere was conducted by Serge Koussevitzky in Moscow on 2 March 1911. On 21 March 1915 it was first performed with colored lighting, by the Russian Symphony Orchestra with Marguerite Volavy on piano, conducted by Modest Altschuler, at Carnegie Hall. Altschuler and Scriabin were contemporaries at the Moscow Conservatory in the early 1890s.

Sir Henry Wood had plans to conduct Prometheus with the part for clavier à lumières, but World War I prevented the performance. The work was performed with colored lighting for the first time in England on 4 May 1972, by the London Symphony Orchestra under Elyakum Shapirra at the Royal Albert Hall.

For a description of several other performances employing novel approaches to color realization in this work, see Hugh MacDonald, The Musical Times 124 (1983) pp. 600–602.

In 2006, the Russian pianist Andrej Hoteev realized a project at Greater Hall of the Laeiszhalle Hamburg: as soloist accompanied by the Hamburg Symphony Orchestra conducted by Andrey Boreyko he presented the authentic colour light score with Scriabin's intended clavier à lumières rediscovered by himself.

In 2010, the Yale Symphony Orchestra, under the conductor Toshiyuki Shimada and in collaboration with the Yale Department of Music and doctoral candidate Anna Gawboy, performed the work with clavier à lumières and full hall lighting using directions from Scriabin's notes.

In 2023, the Antwerp Symphony Orchestra commissioned a radical new light scenography to accompany the piece, made by Brussels artist Antoine Goldschmidt.

In January 2026, the Los Angeles Philharmonic commissioned Grimanesa Amorós to create a light installation to accompany the piece, titled Radiance.

== Transcription ==
Leonid Sabaneyev transcribed the symphonic poem for two pianos (four hands) in 1911. When he initially proposed this, Scriabin was of the opinion that at least eight hands would be necessary, and the composer was reportedly somewhat disconcerted when he realized that his piece could be reduced in this way.
