= Leslie Howard (musician) =

Australian pianist, musicologist and composer

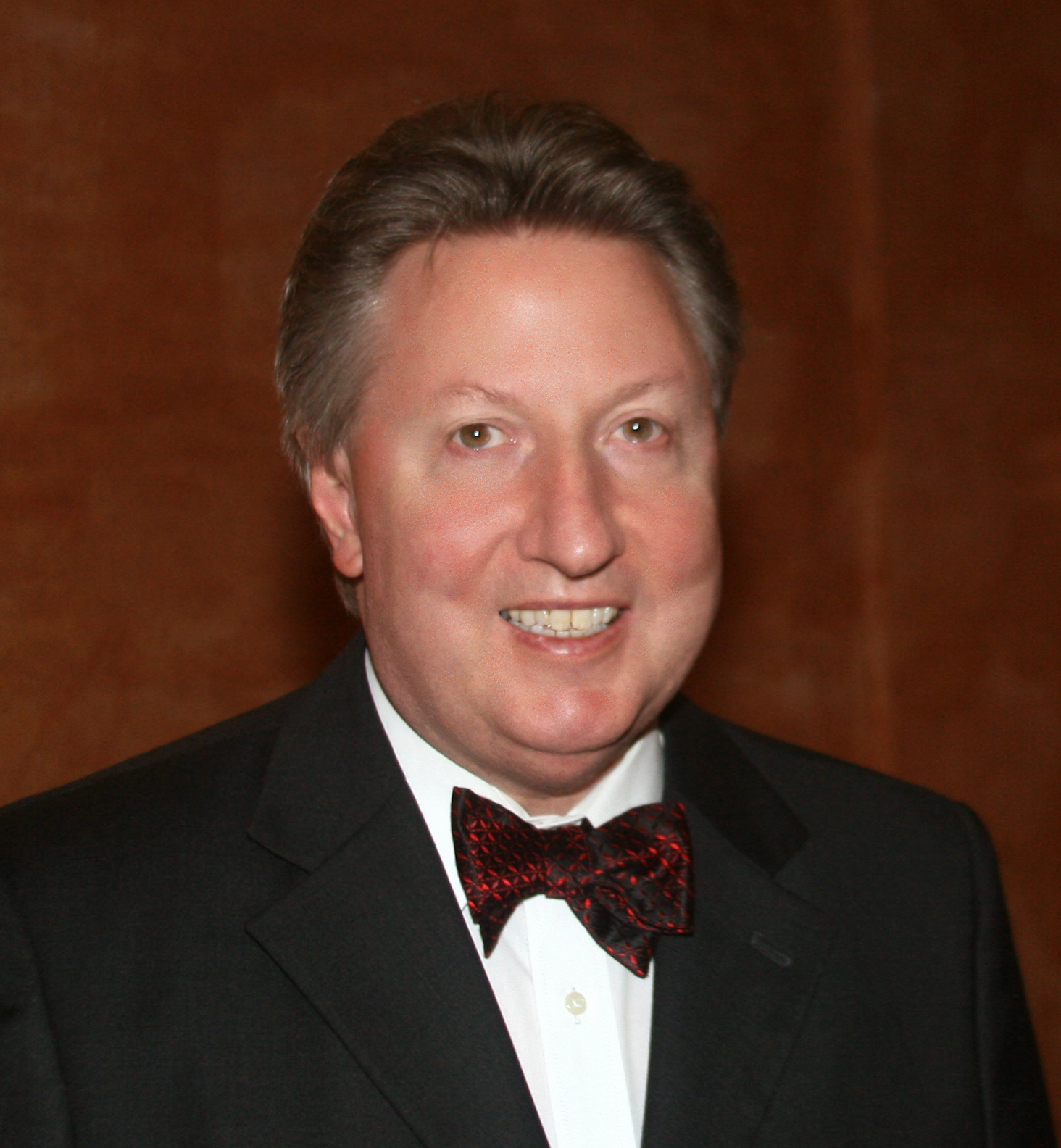
- Leslie Howard in Shanghai, China, on 15 December 2009

Background information
- Born: 29 April 1948 (age 77); Melbourne, Victoria, Australia
- Genres: Classical
- Occupations: Pianist, musicologist and composer
- Instrument: Piano
- Years active: 1953–present
- Label: Hyperion
- Website: www.lesliehowardpianist.co.uk

Leslie John Howard (born 29 April 1948) is an Australian pianist, musicologist and composer. He is best known for being the only pianist to have recorded the complete solo piano works of Franz Liszt, a project which included more than 300 premiere recordings. He has been described by The Guardian as "a master of a tradition of pianism in serious danger of dying out".

== Biography ==
Howard was born in Melbourne the eldest of four children. His brother William is a cellist.

Howard's ability to recall anything by ear, and perfect pitch, was first cited in Melbourne newspaper The Herald, when he was 5 years old. At the age of 5, he performed for Fox Movietone News, and at the age of 9 on Australian national television. His mature debut as a pianist came at the age of 13, with Rachmaninoff's Piano Concerto No. 2. He learned the oboe at an early age, and has even performed Mozart's Oboe Concerto.

He attended Monash University in Melbourne to study English, but by the end of his first year had been invited to lecture the post-graduate students on advanced counterpoint and theory. His post-graduate music studies were completed in Italy, where he studied with Guido Agosti.

He has lived in London since 1972, preferring its climate to that of his native country; he has both Australian and British nationality.

In 1987 Howard became an instructor at the Guildhall School of Music. He often gives masterclasses at the Royal College of Music and Royal Academy of Music.

He frequently appears with promising student pianists to help further their careers. Examples are performances of Liszt's arrangement for two pianos of Beethoven's Ninth Symphony, with Coady Green; piano duets of Percy Grainger with Michael Brownlee-Walker; and conducting a performance of Shostakovich's First Piano Concerto in London's Wigmore Hall, and then again at the Royal Festival Hall for the Pearl Awards, with a 9-year-old Chinese pianist as soloist.

Howard is also frequently invited to sit on the juries of music competitions, such as the International Franz Liszt Piano Competition and the Royal Over-Seas League's annual music competition.

He has a large repertoire of solo and chamber music, and more than 80 works with orchestra. He was a founding member of the now disbanded London Beethoven Trio, which gave regular performances for a number of years.

== Liszt project ==
In 1986, to mark the centenary of Franz Liszt's death, Leslie Howard gave a series of ten Liszt recitals in London's Wigmore Hall. By excluding Liszt's arrangements (fantasies and transcriptions) of other composers' works, and by selecting only the final versions of Liszt's original works for solo piano, Howard was able to represent Liszt's entire solo piano oeuvre in ten mammoth recital programmes.

The founder and managing director of Hyperion Records, Ted Perry, was present at these recitals, and invited Howard to record for the label. All Liszt's versions of his piano music were included, including more than 300 premiere performances and recordings, and pieces unheard since Liszt's lifetime, and also all Liszt's arrangements of other composers' works. Four discs were given to Liszt's seventeen works for piano and orchestra, about half of which were premiere recordings made from unpublished manuscripts.

The series ran at first to 94 full-length CDs (57 volumes), and earned Howard a place in The Guinness Book of Records for completion of the largest recording project ever undertaken by a solo recording artist (including pop artists). (The 53rd volume, the second volume of works for piano and orchestra, included a bonus disc, not counted in the original series numbering, which contained Ungarische Zigeunerweisen, a work for piano and orchestra by Liszt's favourite female student Sophie Menter: Liszt's exact involvement in the work is unknown, but he probably helped Menter in the composition of the solo part in the year before his death; the work was orchestrated seven years later by Menter's friend Pyotr Ilyich Tchaikovsky, who conducted Menter in the premiere the following year).

The last disc of the initial Liszt series was recorded in December 1998, and released on 22 October 1999, Liszt's birthday. After completion of the project, three supplementary volumes were released (the third of which is a double CD) as further Liszt manuscripts came to light, bringing the total number of CDs to 99. A boxed set containing 99 discs was issued by Hyperion Records in 2011 to mark the 200th anniversary of the birth of Liszt.

In 2018, a 100th disc (volume 61) was released, including some rediscovered works, such as the first version of the Hungarian Rhapsody No. 1, and the Kavallerie-Geschwindmarsch, which was believed lost for over a century.

Claims by other pianists to have recorded the complete piano works of Liszt are demonstrably incorrect. Such claims include those by France Clidat, whose Liszt recordings total just 28 CDs; and Gunnar Johansen, whose private home recordings number 53 LPs.

A critic in the BBC Music Magazine declared: "Howard is, by general consensus, the finest living exponent of Liszt. (He has) a formidable intellectual grasp of the music, (and) his vastly superior performances continue to carry the day". As further indication of the status he enjoys among Liszt scholars, Howard was invited to perform at the inauguration of the Istituto Liszt in Bologna, Italy, of which he is an honorary member.

He has been invited by the music publishers Edition Peters to edit the republication of some of their Liszt scores, correcting previous inaccuracies by a return to manuscript sources.

He has also edited several volumes of Liszt Society Publications for Hardie Press and Editio Musica Budapest.

With Michael Short he has published Ferenc Liszt – A List of his Musical Works (Rugginenti, 2004) and Ferenc Liszt – A Thematic Catalogue (Pendragon, 2005). He has a book in progress, The Music of Liszt (Yale University Press).

=== Honours related to his Liszt work ===
Leslie Howard has been the president of the British Liszt Society since the death of the previous president Louis Kentner in 1987, and has also been awarded the American Liszt Society's Medal of Honor.

In 2000 he was awarded the Pro Cultura Hungarica Medal and Citation by the Hungarian Government, a rare honour for a non-Hungarian. He had previously received from the Hungarian government the Ferenc Liszt Medal of Honour, and he has also been awarded France's Grand Prix du Disque six times for his Liszt recordings—all presented to him by the President of Hungary.

In 2004 he was decorated by the President of Hungary with the Medal of St. Stephen.

== Composer ==
Howard is also active as a composer, and has written an opera (based on the Norse tale "Hreidar the Fool", with lyrics by Phillip Carrington and John Gough), a marimba concerto, chamber music, and many piano pieces. Howard's best known work is his "24 Classical Preludes for Piano, Op. 25", cycling through the major and minor keys, each written in the style of a different composer. Howard has recorded this work for Cavendish Music (Boosey & Hawkes).

In 1997 Howard was commissioned by Gramophone magazine to compose and record a short piano piece ("Yuletide Pastorale") for its Christmas Competition: a CD was given away with the magazine, and readers were asked to state in which composer's style the piece was written, and to identify the seven well-known Christmas melodies concealed within it.

Among Howard's arrangements and transcriptions are the final chorale movements of Bach's cantatas nos. 60 and 209, Glazunov's Second Concert Waltz, the aria "Ebben? Ne andrò lontana" from the opera La Wally by Alfredo Catalani, and a Concert Fantasy for Piano on themes from Gilbert and Sullivan's operetta Ruddigore.

== Editor ==
In addition to his work editing and completing many of Liszt's scores, Howard has prepared for publication operas by Bellini, and the violin concertos of Paganini, including the first edition of Paganini's Violin Concerto No. 1 ever to be published in the correct key of E-flat (it usually played from an erroneous edition in D major due to scordatura tuning, the orchestration of which is not by Paganini).

Howard's facility in completing unfinished works has resulted in commissions as diverse as a new realisation of Bach's The Musical Offering, which he orchestrated and conducted in Finland in 1990, and completions of works by composers such as Mozart (String Quartet movement, K. 464a), Scriabin (Sonata in E-flat minor: end of the slow movement, and a 3-bar hole in the finale), Shostakovich (Piano Trio No. 1 in C minor, Op. 8: providing an alternative solution to that by Lyatoshinsky), and Tchaikovsky (Piano Sonata in F minor).

In 2003, Boosey & Hawkes published Howard's "New Corrected Edition" of the 2-piano score of Rachmaninoff's 4th Piano Concerto (in collaboration with Robert Threlfall).

== Recordings ==
In addition to his Liszt project, Leslie Howard's recordings include works by Balakirev, Bax, Beethoven, Borodin, Bridge, Rosemary Brown, Bruckner, Busoni, Chopin, Rebecca Helferich Clarke, Diabelli, Franck, Ignaz Friedman, Gade, Gershwin, Glazunov, Grainger, Granados, Grieg, Mendelssohn, Moszkowski, Mozart, Franz Xaver Mozart, Palmgren, Poulenc, Rachmaninoff, Raff, Reger, Rimsky-Korsakov, Rossini, Anton Rubinstein, Schumann, Sibelius, Smetana, Stravinsky, Tausig, Tchaikovsky, Vaughan Williams and Wagner.

== Other honours ==
In addition to the Liszt-related honours mentioned above, Howard was appointed a Member of the Order of Australia (AM) in the Queen's Birthday Honours in 1999, "for service to the arts as a musicologist, composer, piano soloist and mentor to young musicians." His appointment to the Order of Australia was terminated by the Governor-General in September 2012. It has been suggested that this removal was connected to a 2007 traffic incident in the UK, which led to Howard being banned from driving for three years, given a six-month suspended jail sentence, and ordered to carry out 80 hours' unpaid work and to pay the equivalent of $2,100 costs. Howard has always maintained his innocence of the charges.

In 2001, Howard was awarded a doctorate "honoris causa" by the University of Melbourne.

In November 2009, Howard was invited by the Alkan Society in London to become its new president. He held the position for ten years concurrently with his role as president of the Liszt Society, but relinquished the presidency of the Alkan Society 2018.

== Sources ==
- Kennedy, Michael (2006), The Oxford Dictionary of Music, 985 pages, ISBN 0-19-861459-4
- Logan, Christine. 2001. "Howard, Leslie". The New Grove Dictionary of Music and Musicians, second edition, edited by Stanley Sadie and John Tyrrell. London: Macmillan Publishers.
- list of Steinway Artists
- Leslie Howard official professional biography
- Music & Vision review of Leslie Howard conducting Shostakovich's First Piano Concerto in London's Wigmore Hall
- Leslie Howard conducts Shostakovich's First Piano Concerto at the Royal Festival Hall for the Pearl Awards
- Монахов С. Поэтика Ференца Листа в антологии Лесли Ховарда // Литературные знакомства. – 2024. – No. 9. – С. 216 – 223.
- Монахов С. А. Ференц Лист и его фортепианное наследие в антологии Лесли Ховарда (к 215-летию со дня рождения композитора и 140-летию со дня смерти композитора) // Музыка в школе. – 2025. – No. 4. – С. 3 – 15.
