= Columbus Philharmonic Orchestra =

Symphony orchestra in Columbus, Ohio, US

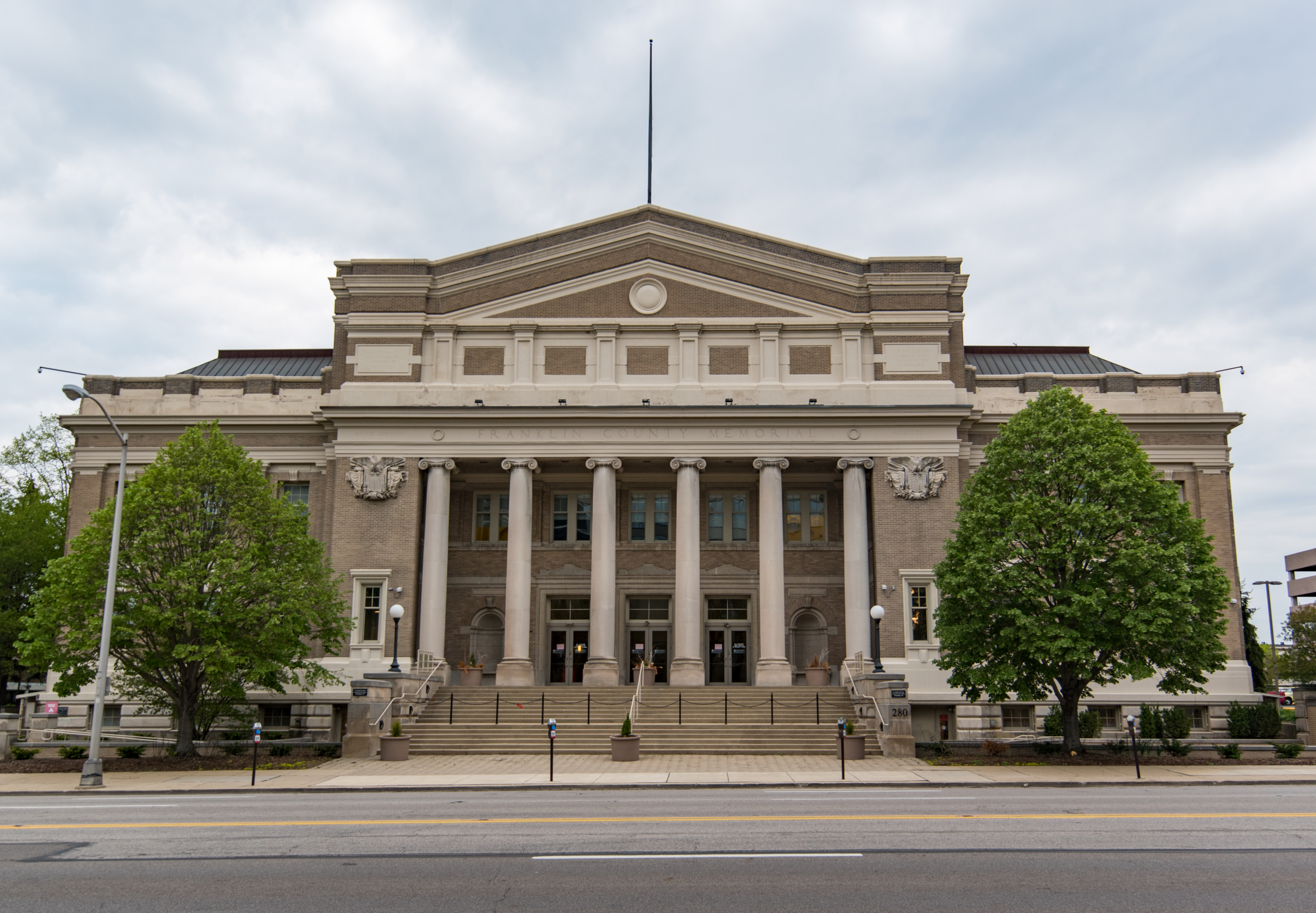
Franklin County Memorial Hall, the orchestra's performance venue

The Columbus Philharmonic Orchestra was a symphony orchestra of the United States, located in Columbus, Ohio. Founded in 1941 and disbanded in 1949, the Columbus Philharmonic was the first professional symphony orchestra in Columbus and was a precursor to the present Columbus Symphony Orchestra. The orchestra's music director was the American conductor Izler Solomon.

== History ==
The orchestra was founded in 1941 and presented concerts in Franklin County Memorial Hall (now the Franklin County Board of Elections building). Originally the orchestra was semi-professional with all of its principal chairs occupied by full-time professional players. Many of these musicians were imported to Columbus from Chicago, Cleveland and elsewhere due to a shortage of local players during World War II. In 1946, it became a full-time professional orchestra, the first in Columbus. In 1949 the fledgling eight-year-old orchestra was disbanded by its board of trustees due to an inability to continue raising the funds necessary to produce its concerts.

The orchestra's concerts were broadcast several times nationally on the NBC Radio network. Live recordings preserving the sound of the philharmonic exist, having been made during concerts by Robert Buchsbaum's local recording company, Coronet Records. Buchsbaum was also the orchestra's principal oboist. One of these, Beethoven's Piano Concerto No. 4 with Artur Schnabel as soloist, was issued on CD by the Pearl label in 1995.

The music director during the entire life of the Columbus Philharmonic was Izler Solomon. Solomon later became music director of the Indianapolis Symphony. Solomon wanted to hire African American musicians, and brought in Carolyn Utz, a bassist, around 1944 as the orchestra's first black musician.

In 1951, the philharmonic's former concertmaster, George Hardesty, started the Columbus Little Symphony. From this group evolved the present Columbus Symphony Orchestra.
