= Adolf Reichel =

German-Swiss composer (1820–1896)

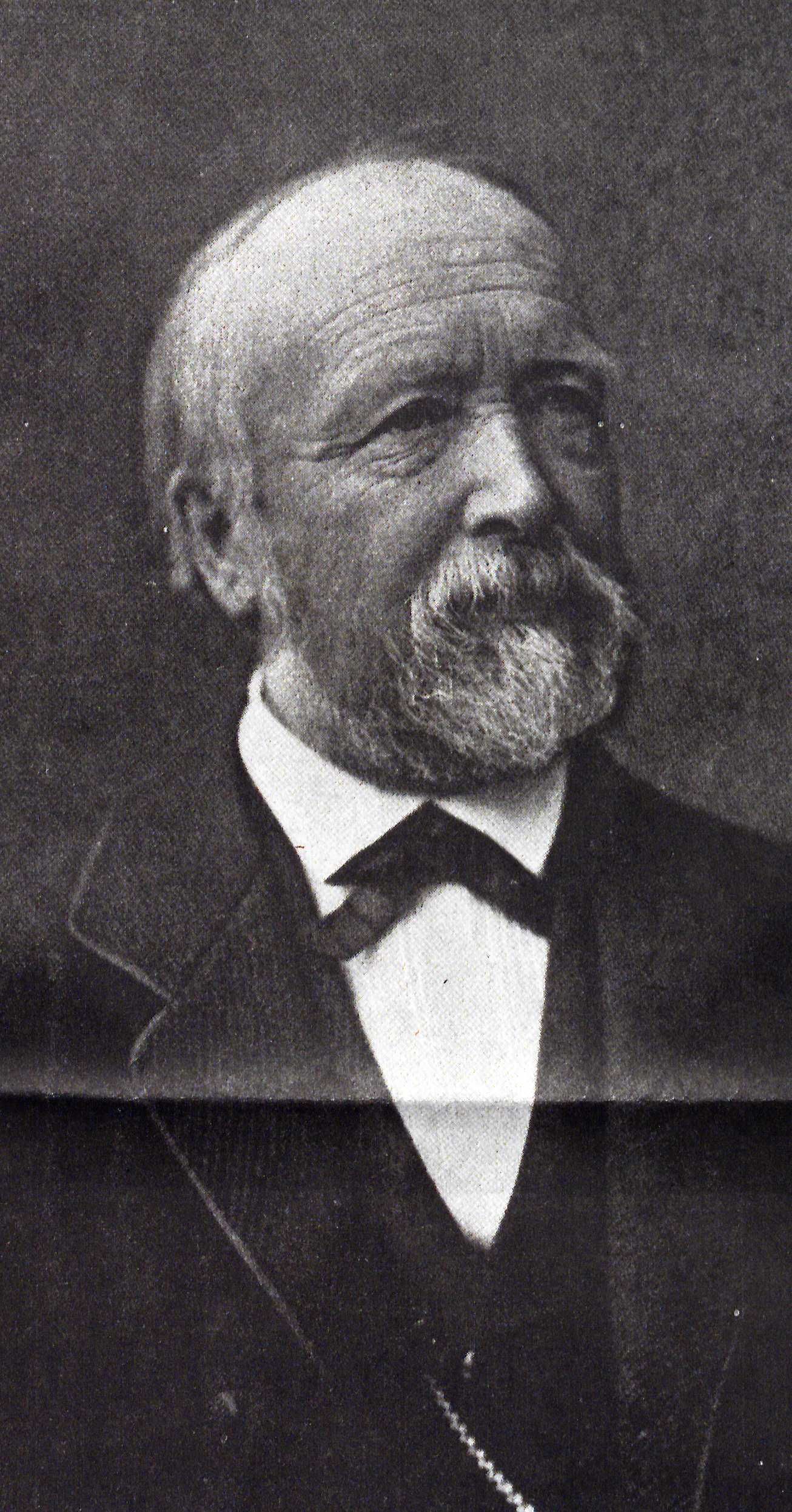
Emil Vollenweider: Adolf Reichel (year n.a.)

Adolf Reichel (30 August 1816 – 5 March 1896) was a German-Swiss orchestral conductor and composer.

== Life ==
Adolf Reichel was a son of an East Elbian German landowning family in Tursnitz, West Prussia (now Turznice in Poland).

He studied composition with Siegfried Dehn in Berlin, piano with Ludwig Berger and instrumentation with Carl Gottlieb Reissiger in Dresden. He found his first job as music teacher to the young hereditary prince Georg von Sachsen-Meiningen. He travelled to Vienna, Bern and Brussels and made a living as a piano teacher in Paris from 1844, where he associated with George Sand and Frédéric Chopin. In 1842, he met the professional revolutionary and anarchist Mikhail Bakunin in Dresden, with whom he had a lifelong friendship. In his circle in Paris he met opposition figures such as Georg Herwegh, Gottfried Kinkel, Karl Marx, Georg Weber, Vasily Petrovich Botkin, Pierre-Joseph Proudhon and Richard Wagner, without himself taking an active part in the 1848 Revolution. In 1850, he and Mariya Kasparovna Ern (1823–1916), whom he had met as an associate of Alexander Herzen, married. They had four sons, one of whom was the later Swiss judge and politician Alexander Reichel.

In 1857 he went to the private Dresdner Konservatorium as a composition teacher and also directed the Dreyssigsche Singakademie there. In view of the political climate in Dresden, which was perceived as repressive, he followed a call as music director to Bern in 1867. He was naturalised in Oberburg in 1869. Until 1884/1888 he was the director of the Bern Symphony Orchestra, the Musikschule der Bernischen Musikgesellschaft (BMG) and the choir of the Cäcilienverein in Bern. He composed piano and choral songs and larger choral and orchestral works, including a German Mass, symphonies and overtures. Of his approximately 600 works in the style of the Classical and early Romantic periods, many were printed during his lifetime by Bote & Bock, Breitkopf & Härtel, Simon Richault and other music publishers.

Most of his composition legacy, which has now been reconstructed, is kept in the library of the University of the Arts Bern, and his handwritten memoirs in the Internationaal Instituut voor Sociale Geschiedenis in Amsterdam.

== Works ==
- Free scores by Adolf Reichel at the International Music Score Library Project (IMSLP)

== Bibliography ==
- Regula Puskás: Reichel, Adolf. In: Historisches Lexikon der Schweiz
- Jaap Klosterman: Phantome. Aus den Papieren Adolf Reichels. In: Ursula Becker, Heiner M. Becker, Jaap Kloosterman (eds.): Kein Nachruf! Beiträge über und für Götz Langkau. IISG, Amsterdam 2003, pp. 64–69
- Max Sommerhalder: Bakunin fürchtet, Zahnschmerzen zu bekommen. In: Dissonanz/Dissonance Nr. 136, Dezember 2016, Basel 2016, pp. 19–22
- Jannis Mallouchos: Der Gesang der Okeaniden. Michail Bakunin und die Musik. bahoe books, Wien 2017 ISBN 9783903022669
- Edgar Refardt: Historisch-biographisches Musikerlexikon der Schweiz. Gebr. Hug&Co, Leipzig/Zürich 1928, pp. 254–255
- Jannis Mallouchos: Adolf Reichel (1816-1896). Politische, kulturhistorische, musiktheoretische und kompositorische Aspekte eines Musikerlebens. Hollitzer, Wien 2023 ISBN 978-3-99094-084-6 ISSN 2617-3344
