= Mario Venzago =

Swiss conductor

- Born: 1948 (age 77–78); Zürich, Switzerland
- Genre: Classical
- Occupations: Conductor, pedagogue
- Formerly of: Deutsche Kammerphilharmonie; Gothenburg Symphony; Graz Opera; Heidelberg Opera; Indianapolis Symphony; Sinfonieorchester Basel; Stadtorchester Winterthur
- Website: www.MarioVenzago.com

Mario Venzago (born 1948) is a Swiss conductor.

== Biography ==
Venzago began piano studies at age five. He studied at the conservatory and the university in Zurich. He later studied conducting with Hans Swarowsky in Vienna.

His other positions have included music directorships with Stadtorchester Winterthur (1978–1986), the Heidelberg Opera (1986–1989), the Deutsche Kammerphilharmonie, Frankfurt/Bremen (1989–1992), Graz Opera (1991–1994), Sinfonieorchester Basel (1997–2003), and the Basque National Orchestra (Orquesta de Euskadi; 1998–2001). From 2004 to 2007, he was principal conductor of the Gothenburg Symphony Orchestra. He became chief conductor of the Bern Symphony Orchestra with the 2010–2011 season, and concluded his Bern tenure at the close of the 2020–2021 season.

Venzago made his American debut in 1988 at the Hollywood Bowl while he was a conducting fellow at the Los Angeles Philharmonic Institute studying with Leonard Bernstein. He became music director of the Indianapolis Symphony Orchestra in 2002. His initial contract in Indianapolis was for four years. He renewed his contract in 2005, for one year, and with an "evergreen" agreement for automatic annual renewal, depending on mutual consent. On 30 July 2009, Simon Crookall, the CEO of the Indianapolis Symphony Orchestra, announced that Venzago's contract would not be renewed and that all advertised appearances with the orchestra in 2009–2010 had been cancelled as a result of non-renewal. Other work in the US has included the artistic directorship from 2000 to 2003 of the Summer Music Fest of the Baltimore Symphony Orchestra.

Venzago and his wife Marianne have two sons, Mario and Gabriel.

Cultural offices
Preceded by Nikša Bareza	General Music Director, Graz Opera; 1991–1994	Succeeded by Giancarlo Andretta
Preceded by Raymond Leppard	Music Director, Indianapolis Symphony Orchestra; 2002–2009	Succeeded by Krzysztof Urbański
Preceded by Andrey Boreyko	Chief Conductor, Bern Symphony Orchestra; 2010–2021	Succeeded by Krzysztof Urbański (designate, effective 2024)
