= Alessandro Siciliani =

Italian composer

Alessandro Domenico Siciliani
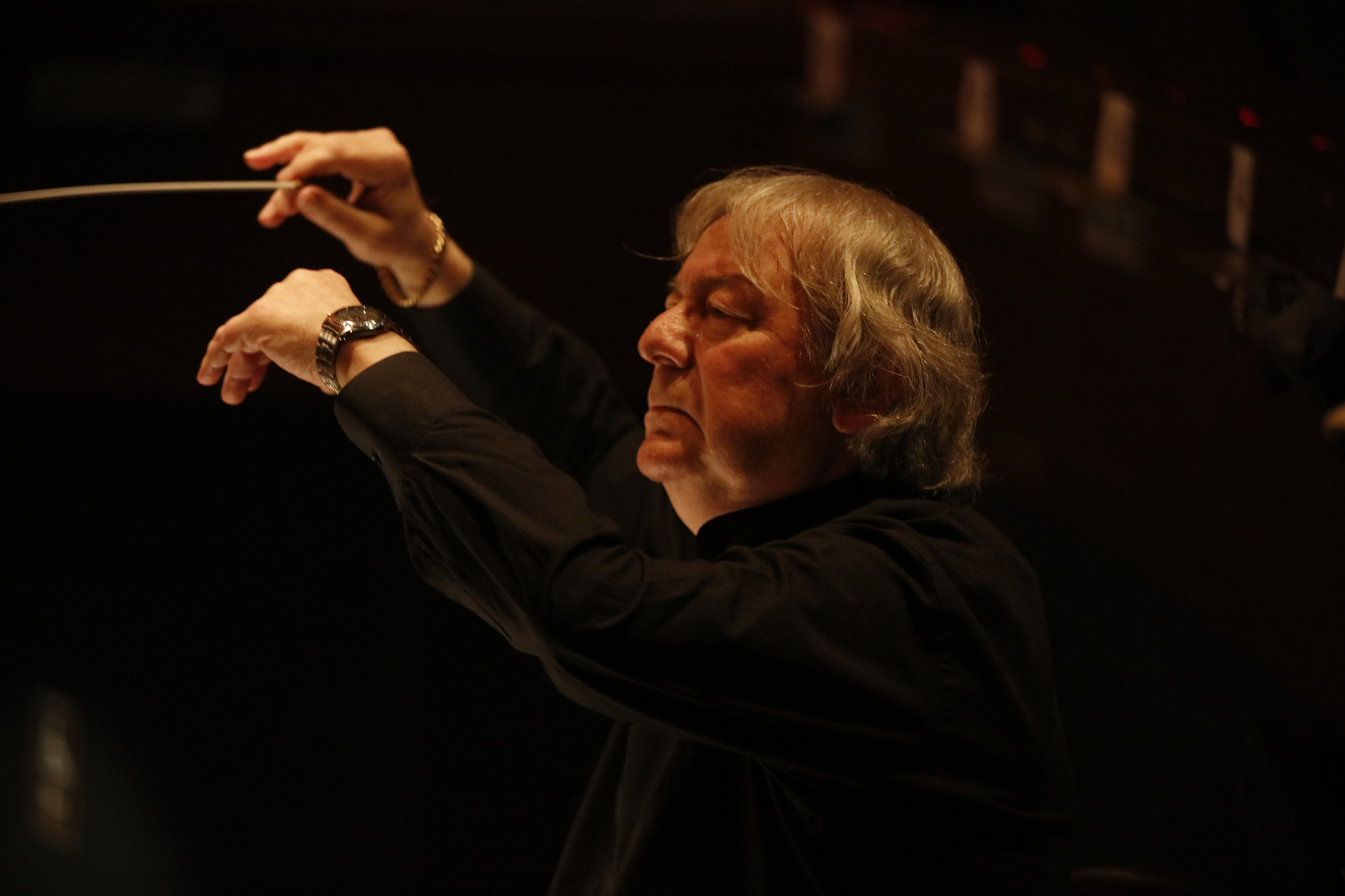
- Born: 5 June 1952 (age 74); Florence, Tuscany, Italy
- Occupations: Orchestra Conductor and Composer
- Years active: 1965 — Present
- Spouse: Elizabeth Holleque (married 1990, div. 2002)
- Children: Giacomo Siciliani (b. 1991)

Alessandro Siciliani (born 1952) is an Italian conductor of opera and symphonic music. He is also a composer of symphonic music. Siciliani was born in Florence, Italy, the son of Ambra and Francesco Siciliani, the celebrated opera impresario. Siciliani currently resides in Columbus, Ohio, where he was the music director of the Columbus Symphony Orchestra from 1992 to 2004.

== Life and career ==
Siciliani's early life was spent growing up in the opera world of Italy where his father was the director of the country's most prominent opera company, La Scala from 1957 until 1966. His musical interests were formed while attending his father's rehearsals where he had the opportunity to rub shoulders with the world's leading conductors, musicians and opera stars.

Siciliani received his musical training at the Giuseppe Verdi Conservatory in Milan and at the Santa Cecilia Academy in Rome. His studies focused on conducting, which he studied with Franco Ferrara, piano, and composition, graduating with highest honors in all three.

As a conductor, Siciliani has divided his time between opera and the symphonic repertoire. In opera, he conducted extensively at the New York City Opera and made his debut with the Metropolitan Opera on opening night of the 1988/1989 season. Most recently he conducted at the Mariinsky Theatre (formerly the Kirov) in Saint Petersburg, Russia in 2008. As a symphonic conductor he has performed with major orchestras in Prague, Munich, Cologne, Dallas, Pittsburgh, and Washington DC, among many others.

From 1992 to 2004 he was the music director of the Columbus Symphony Orchestra. During his time on the podium the orchestra achieved some of its greatest successes to date, increasing its audience and celebrating its 50th anniversary with a debut appearance at Carnegie Hall. Siciliani's vivid interpretations of the romantic symphonic repertoire and of Italian opera endeared him to audiences in Columbus where he remains a popular figure. In July 2008, he was enthusiastically received when he returned to the podium to conduct the musicians of the Columbus Symphony in a benefit concert during the CSO's recent contract dispute.

Currently, Siciliani maintains his career as a conductor, making guest appearances in Europe and the U.S. He also continues composing, writing works for symphony and chorus.

== Early life ==
Siciliani grew up in Florence and Milan in the home of his parents Ambra and Francesco Siciliani. His father was one of the most important and powerful Artistic Directors in Europe in the 20th century who helped revive some of Italy’s great opera houses after World War II.

Francesco Siciliani was Artistic Director and Manager of La Scala in Milan, The San Carlo in Naples, La Ferenci in Venice, and Theatre Covenale in Florence. He was famous for promoting the early career of such artists as Maria Callas, Renata Tebaldi, and Mario del Monaco.

Alessandro attended all of his father’s rehearsals at the famed Teatro Alla Scala from the time he was a young boy and it instilled in him a deep affinity for opera. Renata Tebaldi was his Godmother.

Siciliani studied at the Giuseppe Verdi Milano Conservatory and at Santa Cecilia in Rome graduating with highest honors in piano, composition, and conducting. He studied conducting with the legendary Franco Ferrara, Leonard Bernstein, Lorin Maazel, Ricardo Muti, and Zubin Mehta.

Siciliani also taught Theory and Solfeggio at the Conservatory of L’Aquila in Abruzzo 1979-1983, as well as Theory and Harmony at the Conservatory of Santa Cecilia in rome 1983-1988

== Career ==
After graduating from Santa Cecilia Conservatory, Siciliani started making guest conducting appearances with orchestras all over the United States and Europe including at the New York City Opera, Metropolitan Opera in New York, Opera company of Philadelphia, Wolf Trap in Washington, DC, Pittsburgh Symphony, Atlanta Symphony, Dallas Symphony, Prague symphony, Radio Orchestra of Munich, National Symphony

Orchestra of Mexico City, English Chamber Orchestra, Teatro dell’Opera of Rome, Teatro Liceo of Barcelona, as well as orchestras in Hong Kong, St. Petersburg, São Paulo, Buenos Aires and the National Symphony Orchestra in Washington, D.C., among others.

Maestro Siciliani took the helm of the Columbus Symphony Orchestra 1992–2004, where he led the orchestra’s first recordings in over 20 years and he took the Columbus Symphony Orchestra to debut at Carnegie Hall in 2001. He has a unique ability to take classical music and make it accessible to everyone and during his tenure with the Columbus symphony he continued to lead the orchestra performances to packed houses.

In 2010 until the present, Maestro Siciliani has returned to his operatic roots as the music director of Opera Project Columbus where he uses his talents to boost emerging opera talents from central Ohio and beyond.

== Orchestra and opera appearances ==
=== Opera houses ===
==== Italy ====
- Teatro Dell’Opera of Rome
- Teatro San Carlo of Naples
- Teatro Massimo of Palermo
- Teatro Morlacchi of Perugia

==== Europe ====
- Teatro Liceo of Barcellona
- Theatre de L’Opera of Nice
- Theatre de L’Opera of Marseilles
- Theatre de L’Opera of Avignone
- Theatre de L’Opera of Liege

==== United States ====
- Metropolitan Opera in New York
- New York City Opera
- Cincinnati Opera Company
- Opera Company Louisville, Kentucky
- Opera Columbus, Columbus, Ohio
- Opera Project Columbus, Columbus, Ohio
- Opera Company of Philadelphia
- Opera Company of New Orleans
- Academy of Vocal Arts in Philadelphia
- Wolf Trap, Washington, DC
- Saratoga Springs Summer Festival

=== Symphony orchestras ===
==== United States ====
- Pittsburgh Symphony
- Washington National Symphony
- Cincinnati Symphony
- Atlanta Symphony
- Dallas Symphony
- Columbus Symphony Orchestra
- Buffalo Orchestra
- Jacksonville Symphony
- Nashville Symphony
- Ft. Worth Symphony
- Colorado Symphony
- Sacramento Symphony
- Long Beach Symphony Orchestra
- Grant Park Chicago Festival
- Grand Titan Festival
- Chautauqua Festival

==== Italy ====
- Orchestra Sinfonica Siciliana (Palermo)
- Orchestra Sinfonica of Perugia
- Orchestra da Camera of Perugia
- Orchestra del Festival di Lanciano in Abruzzo
- Orchestra Sinfonica of Parma
- Orchestra Sinfonica Abruzzese in L’Aquila
- Orchestra Sinfonica of Bari
- Radio orchestra of Rome
- Orchestra Scarlatti of Naples
- Orchestra Sinfonica di Cagliari
- Festival Panatenee Pompeiane in Agrigento

==== Europe, Asia, and South America ====
- Radio Orchestra of Munich
- Gurzenich-Orchester/Kolner Philarmoniker of Cologne, Germany
- Stockholm Philarmonik
- Goteborg Symphony
- English Chamber Orchestra
- Orchestra Symphonic of Warsaw
- Crakov Radio Orchestra
- Prague Symphony
- Orchestra Sinfonica of Bilbao, Spain
- Orchestre National du Capitol, Toulouse, France
- Orchestre National de Lyon
- Orchestra Sinfonica del Teatro de Sao Paulo
- Orchestra Sinfonica del Teatro Colon, Buenos Aires
- National Symphony Orchestra of Mexico City
- Orchestra Sinfonica di Jalapa, Mexico
- Hong Kong Symphony
- Spring Festival of Prague

== Awards and accolades ==
- Carte de Paris, Boston, July 1992
- Amerigo Vespucci Award given to Italian conductors of international stature, 1992

Donal Henahan, New York Times,” The City Opera struck gold this time in finding a young Italian maestro, Alessandro Siciliani to conduct La Rondine.”

New York Times Music Critic John Rockwell declared Siciliani “the Lorin Maazel of opera conductors”

== Compositions ==
- L'Amour Peintre (ballet)
- Giona (oratorio)
- Recherche #1 for small orchestra and organ
- Recherche #2 for large orchestra
- Cantata Divertimento for 4 vocal soloists, choir, and 18 instruments
- Terzetto Antico Colloquiale con Presenza Angelica Pastorale for oboe, clarinet, bassoon, harp, and string orchestra
- Piccola Suite Promenade for chamber orchestra
- Blue Notes for piano and orchestra
- Raccolta di Canti Popolari Toscani for different instrumental groupings
- Raccolta di Mottetti
- Psalm XXII for Tenor and Large Orchestra

== Recordings ==
- Live from Carnegie Hall, 2001
- CSO Showcase 2001
- Italian TV RAI: Otello by Rossini from Teatro Massimo di Palermo
- Italian TV RAI: Semiramide by Rossini from Teatro San Carlo of Naples
- Italian TV RAI:L Bossi, Poulenc Concertos for Organ, Barber adagio for Strings, Mendelssohn Symphony #1 Orchestra Scarlatti of Naples
- Italian TV RAI: The Last Symphony of Mozart at Vesuvio, Orchestra Scarlatti of Naples
- Recital of Montserrat Caballe’ at La Salle Playal in Paris
