= Izler Solomon =

American orchestra conductor

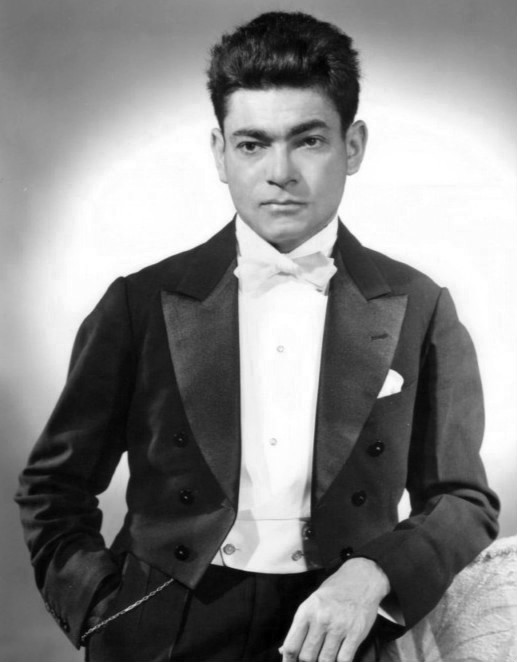
- Solomon in 1948.
- Born: January 11, 1910; Saint Paul, Minnesota
- Died: December 6, 1987 (aged 77); Fort Wayne, Indiana
- Resting place: Crown Hill Cemetery and Arboretum, Community Mausoleum, Niche, 41-J; 39.8274766°N 86.1730061°W
- Occupation: Orchestra conductor

Izler Solomon (January 11, 1910 – December 6, 1987) was an American orchestra conductor, active mostly in the Midwest.

== Career ==
Born in Saint Paul, Minnesota, Izler Solomon's first position as music director was from 1936 to 1941 with the Illinois Symphony Orchestra. While there, he premiered more than 150 American works. Subsequently, he was music director of the Columbus Philharmonic Orchestra (1941–1949), and of the Indianapolis Symphony Orchestra (1956–1976). As a guest conductor, Solomon appeared with the Philadelphia Orchestra, Chicago Symphony, Milwaukee Symphony Orchestra, Israel Philharmonic, and Indiana University Philharmonic Orchestra. His career was cut short by a stroke in 1976. He died in 1987, in Fort Wayne, Indiana.

He made a number of respected recordings, including the world premiere recording of Max Bruch's Violin Concerto No. 2, with the RCA Victor Symphony Orchestra, and Jascha Heifetz as soloist, in 1954.

Preceded by Fabien Sevitzky	Music Directors, Indianapolis Symphony Orchestra; 1956–1976	Succeeded by John Nelson
