= Columbus Symphony Orchestra =

American symphony orchestra

- Orchestra
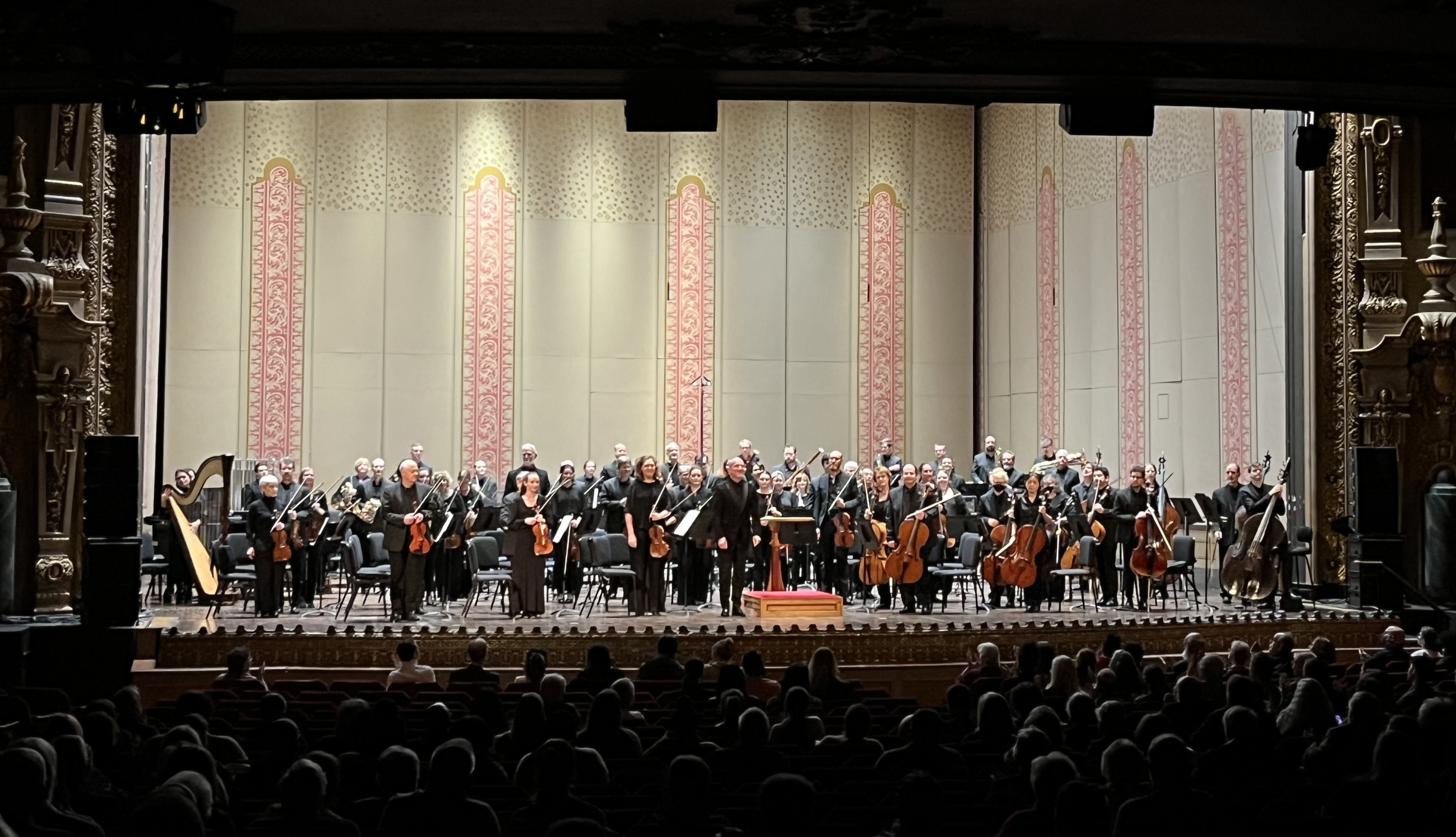
- Columbus Symphony Orchestra in 2024
- Former name: Columbus Little Symphony,
- Founded: 1951
- Principal conductor: Rossen Milanov
- Website: www.columbussymphony.com

The Columbus Symphony Orchestra (CSO) is an American symphony orchestra based in Columbus, Ohio. The oldest performing arts organization in the city, its home is the Ohio Theatre. The orchestra's current executive director is Maureen O'Brien. Rossen Milanov is the orchestra's music director.

The Columbus Symphony offers 12 classical concert programs annually, mostly in pairs of two performances, 6 pops programs, and 2 Concerts for Kids. In the summer, the orchestra performs a series of outdoor pops programs, "Picnic with the Pops" and "Popcorn Pops", on the lawn of Columbus Commons. The Columbus Symphony also serves as the orchestra for Opera Columbus and BalletMet.

== History ==
The Columbus Symphony Orchestra was founded in 1951 as the Columbus Little Symphony, following the demise of the city's previous professional symphony, the Columbus Philharmonic Orchestra. The first music director of the orchestra George Hardesty. In its first year, the Columbus Little Symphony presented a series of 5 concerts with 28 musicians. Its first full season of concerts took place at Central High School (now COSI Columbus) in 1952. In 1955, the Columbus Little Symphony officially became the Columbus Symphony Orchestra. From its founding until 1961, the symphony was unique in that it was governed exclusively by women, veterans of the Women's Association of the Columbus Philharmonic.

The longest-serving music director was Evan Whallon, who led the orchestra for 26 seasons, from 1956 to 1982. From 1956 to 1970, the orchestra performed concerts at the Franklin County Veterans Memorial Auditorium. The Ohio Theatre has been the orchestra's home since 1970. The former movie theater was saved from demolition and renovated largely to provide a new hall for the orchestra.

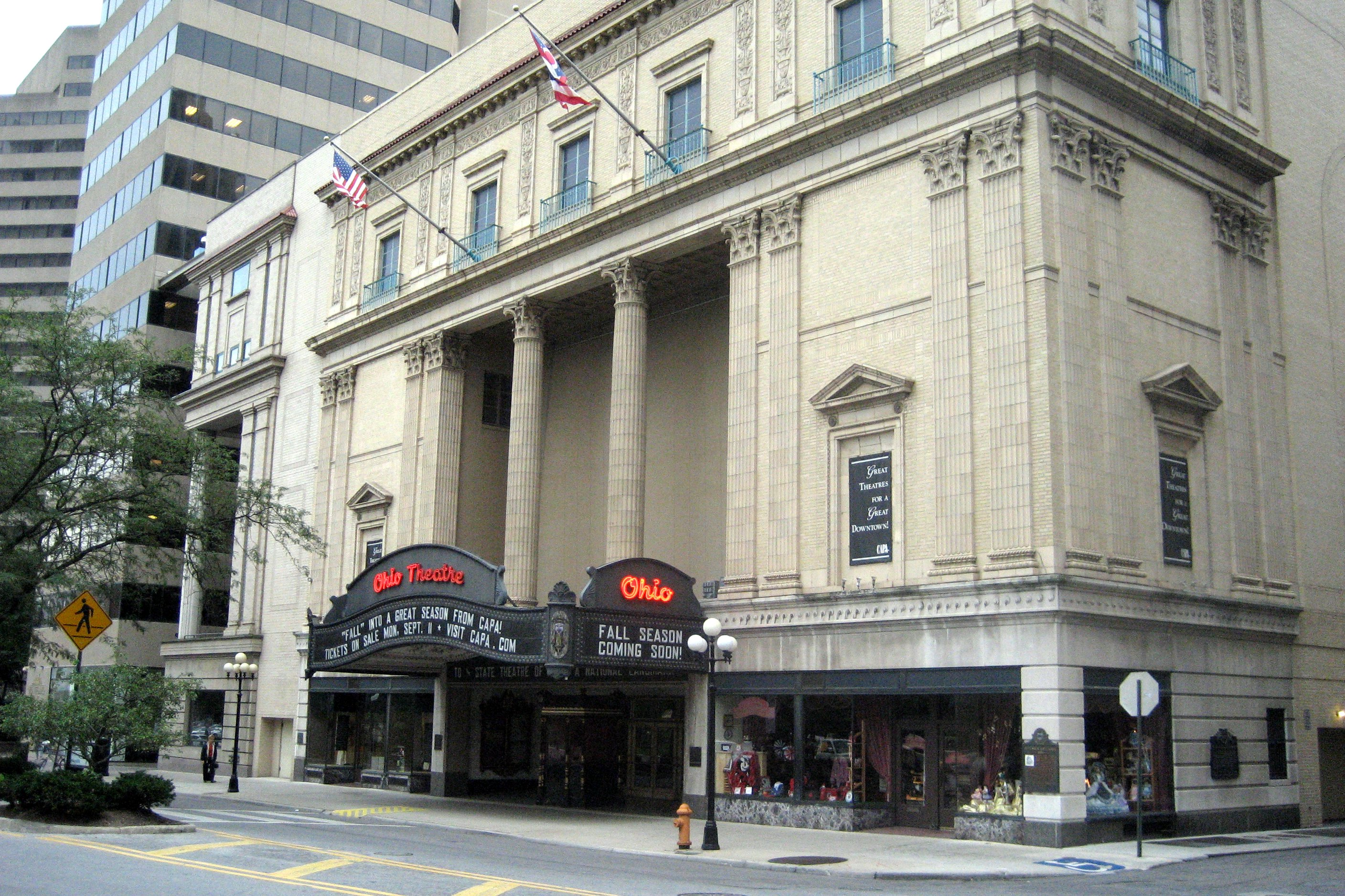
Ohio Theatre

In the absence of a professional opera company in Columbus, the Columbus Symphony began presenting opera in the 1970s. At this time, it was also able to hire its first full-time musicians, thus increasing the caliber of its performances. By 1980, the Columbus Symphony was presenting three fully staged operatic productions each year. In 1981, as the symphony celebrated its 30th anniversary, it had grown from three concerts in its first season to a nine-concert symphonic series, three pops concerts, a chamber orchestra and ensemble series, more than 200 educational programs, and three major outdoor pops concerts. Due to high demand for opera, Opera Columbus was formed so the symphony could focus on symphonic music. 1983 began the inaugural season of the Columbus Symphony's Picnic with the Pops summer concert series, now a central Ohio tradition.

Throughout the 1980s and 1990s, the symphony expanded in size and activity, becoming an orchestra of up to 53 full-time musicians and offering a full slate of classical and pops concerts with noted guest artists. In addition, it began performing with Opera Columbus and Ballet Met and expanded its educational activities, both in the Columbus City Schools and with a youth orchestra program. In 2001, it celebrated its 50th anniversary with a debut concert at Carnegie Hall under music director Alessandro Siciliani. Gunther Herbig, the former conductor of the Detroit Symphony Orchestra, was the orchestra's music adviser during the search for a music director following the tenure of Siciliani.

After a two-year search, management named Junichi Hirokami as the orchestra's sixth music director on June 1, 2006. In 2008, the orchestra faced a severe financial crisis, resulting in an extended labor dispute centering around a proposal by the orchestra's board to reduce the number of full-time musicians from 53 to 31. The summer pops season was canceled, and the orchestra's musicians staged a series of independent concerts during the orchestra's suspension of activities, conducted by Siciliani and Hirokami. The orchestra's troubles received national attention with articles appearing in The Plain Dealer in Cleveland, The Cincinnati Enquirer, The New York Times, The Wall Street Journal, and other publications. During the orchestra's 2008 financial crisis, Hirokami strongly supported the musicians, which caused strained relations between him and the orchestra's board and management. On November 13, 2008, in a letter to the orchestra's musicians, Hirokami announced that the board of the Columbus Symphony Orchestra had dismissed him from his post, effective immediately. Herbig returned as the orchestra's de facto principal guest conductor, though without that formal title, and musical adviser.

On September 22, 2008, management announced that the board and musicians of the CSO ratified a new contract that allowed a truncated 2008-2009 concert season to proceed following five months of silence. The new contract preserved the orchestra's 53 full-time positions but reduced salaries by about 27 percent. Further cuts in management expense reduced the annual budget by a total of $2.7 million, for a new annual budget of $9.5 million. The concessions were, according to news reports, in the interest of preserving the orchestra. Following the dispute, the symphony board selected Martin Inglis, as its new chairman. Subsequently, executive director Tony Beadle left the organization. Roland Valliere, began his tenure with as executive director of the orchestra on August 3, 2009. During the 2009–2010 season, the Columbus Symphony resumed performing a full season of classical and pops concerts, its first since the dispute.

Jean-Marie Zeitouni served as music director from 2010 to 2014. The orchestra's seventh music director, appointed in 2014, is Rossen Milanov. The noted Bulgarian conductor assumed his duties full-time beginning with the 2015–2016 season. In July 2016, rapper Nelly performed with the Columbus Symphony Orchestra. In 2019, the Ohio State University Marching Band performed with the group during an annual event hosted by Nationwide Insurance, Picnic with the Pops.

== Music directors ==
- Claude Monteux (1953–1956)
- Evan Whallon (1956–1982)
- Christian Badea (1983–1991)
- Alessandro Siciliani (1991–2003)
- Gunther Herbig (2003–2006; and 2009–2011; music adviser)
- Junichi Hirokami (June 1, 2006 – 2008)
- Jean-Marie Zeitouni (2010–2014)
- Rossen Milanov (2015–present)

== Youth Orchestra ==
The Columbus Symphony also sponsors a youth orchestra program, directed by Elias Miller. The program is divided into four Orchestras, based on ability and age.

- Junior Strings - grades 3-6
- Chamber Strings - grades 6-9
- Repertory Orchestra - grades 7-10
- Youth Orchestra - grades 9-12

== Notable events ==
- 1951 - Columbus Little Symphony, conducted by violinist George Hardesty, debuts at the Ohio State Archaeological and Historical Museum.
- 1960 - Columbus Symphony Chorus is organized as an auditioned all-volunteer ensemble of more than 100 voices.
- 1970 - The Columbus Symphony Orchestra moves its concerts to a new home, the Ohio Theatre, which was preserved in part to provide an acoustically superior hall for the orchestra.
- 1974 - A grant from the National Endowment for the Arts enables the Columbus Symphony to produce The Barber of Seville, making the CSO one of only a handful of U.S. orchestras producing opera. The CSO continued to produce staged operas each season until the establishment of the independent Opera Columbus company in 1981.
- 1978 - A grant from Battelle Foundation enables the orchestra to hire additional full-time musicians, giving the institution a core of 13 professional players and helping it to achieve a higher quality of performance.
- 1999 - The CSO performs with Luciano Pavarotti for a sold-out crowd at the Schottenstein Center.
- 2001 - As part of its year-long, 50th anniversary celebration, the symphony and chorus perform at Carnegie Hall in New York City.
- 2008 - The orchestra faces financial crisis. Picnic with the Pops season is canceled.
- 2008 - Yo-Yo Ma performs the Haydn Cello Concerto in C with the symphony, May 15. In support of the symphony, he speaks to the audience (a packed house) and remains on stage to play the final piece on the program (Maurice Ravel's Boléro).
- 2009 - The Columbus Symphony returns in the spring with a shortened season featuring guest artists such as pianist Emanuel Ax and trumpet player Chris Botti. The summer series, "Picnic with the Pops," is re-instated and begins June 20.
- 2009 - The Columbus Symphony launches a full concert calendar for the 2009–2010 season.
