= Fabien Sevitzky =

Russian-born American conductor (1891–1967)

- Fabien Sevitzky (photo with 1954 dedication)
- Occupation: conductor

Fabien Sevitzky (September 29, 1891 in Vyshny Volochyok – February 3, 1967 in Athens) was a Russian-born American conductor. He was the nephew of renowned double-bass virtuoso and longtime Boston Symphony Orchestra conductor Serge Koussevitzky.

Sevitzky became music director of the Indianapolis Symphony Orchestra in 1937 after he first conducted it in winter 1936, and remained in the position until 1955. He led the orchestra in a series of recordings for RCA Victor from 1941 to 1946 & for Capitol Records up to 1953, which were issued on 78-rpm and 33-1/3-rpm discs. The orchestra was recorded in the Murat Theatre. Among the more unusual recordings were of Tchaikovsky's first symphony (recorded March 19, 1946) and Manfred (recorded January 27, 1942).

He married harpist Mary Spaulding in 1959, and the couple subsequently moved to Miami to take up faculty positions at the University of Miami while his wife also gave private harp lessons. He guest-conducted the University's orchestra soon after his arrival, and became its permanent conductor in 1963. He championed the music of William Grant Still, from whom he commissioned works including Threnody: In Memory of Jan Sibelius, and conducted the premiere of Still's opera Highway 1, U.S.A. in 1960. He was music director of the Greater Miami Philharmonic Orchestra from 1956 to 1962, and died suddenly in 1967.

His wife, who later became Mary Spaulding Portanova, survived him.

Cultural offices
Preceded by Ferdinand Schaefer	Music Director, Indianapolis Symphony Orchestra; 1937–1956	Succeeded by Izler Solomon
