= Sophie Menter =

German pianist and composer (1846–1918)

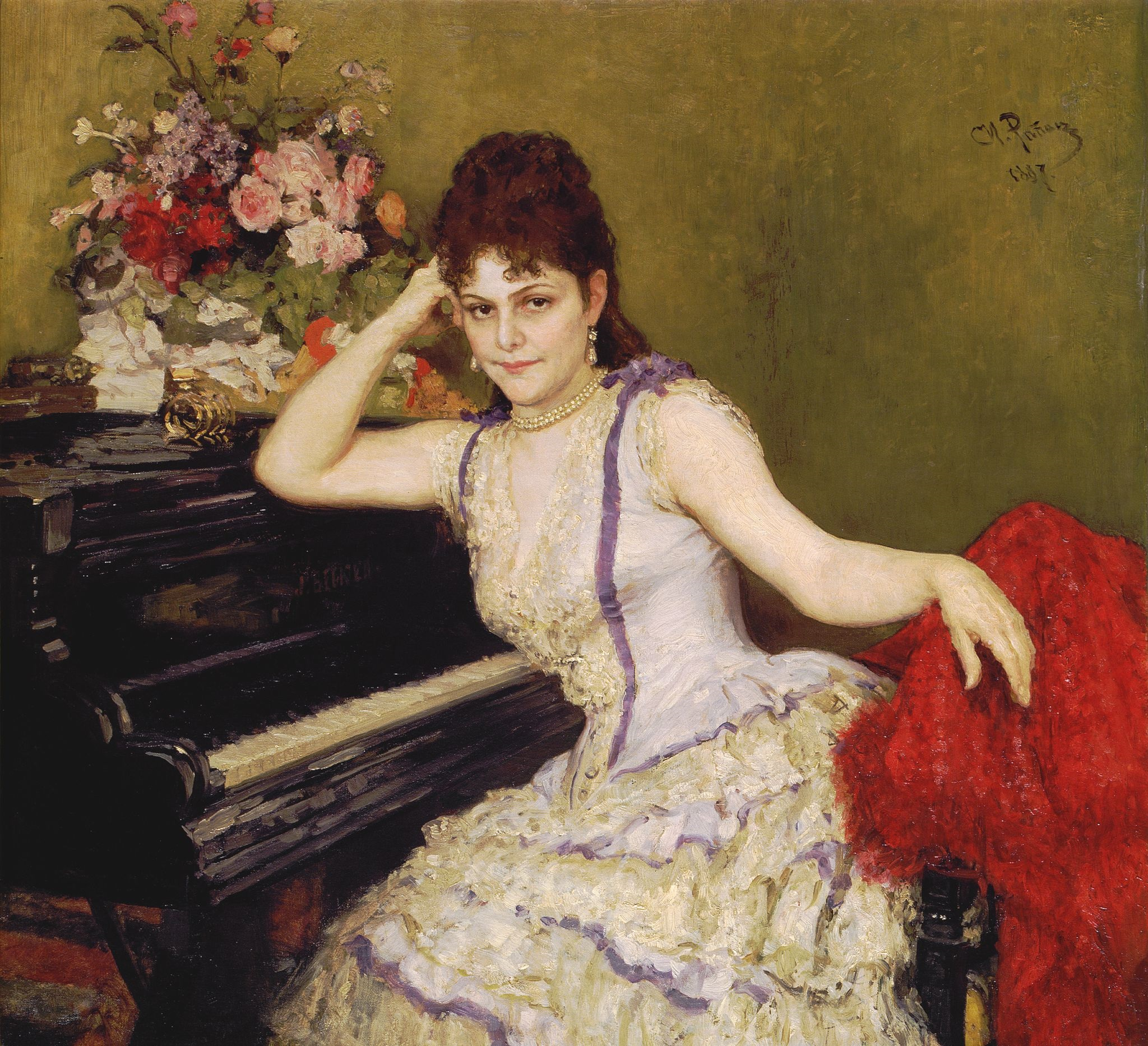
- Portrait by Ilya Repin, 1887

Background information
- Born: 29 July 1847; Munich
- Died: 23 February 1918 (aged 71) Stockdorf
- Genre: Classical music
- Occupation: Pianist
- Instrument: Piano

Sophie Menter (29 July 1846 – 23 February 1918) was a German pianist and composer who became the favorite female student of Franz Liszt. She was called l'incarnation de Liszt in Paris because of her robust, electrifying playing style and was considered one of the greatest piano virtuosos of her time. She died in Stockdorf, near Munich.

== Biography ==
Sophie Menter was born in Munich, the daughter of cellist Josef Menter and singer Wilhelmine Menter (née Diepold). She studied piano with Siegmund Lebert and later Friedrich Niest. At 15, she played Carl Maria von Weber's Konzertstück for piano and orchestra with Franz Lachner conducting.

Her first concert appearances took her to Stuttgart, Frankfurt and Switzerland, and in 1867 she became acclaimed for her interpretation of Liszt's piano music at the Leipzig Gewandhaus. In Berlin, Menter became acquainted with the famous pianist Carl Tausig; she became a pupil of Liszt in 1869 after studying with Tausig and Hans von Bülow.

While studying in Berlin in 1870, American pianist Amy Fay was impressed by Menter, who she described as “becoming very celebrated and who plays superbly.” "I envied her dreadfully," write Fay in Music Study in Germany. "She plays everything by heart, and has a beautiful conception. She gave her concert entirely alone, except that someone sang a few songs, and at the end [Karl] Tausig played a duet for two pianos with her, in which he took the second piano."

Between 1872 and 1886 she was married to cellist David Popper, with whom she had a daughter named Celeste. In 1881 she first appeared in England and was awarded honorary membership of the Royal Philharmonic Society two years later. In 1883 she became professor of piano at the Saint Petersburg Conservatory but left in 1886 to continue concertizing.

Because of her popularity, Menter succeeded with music that no other pianist would touch. This included Liszt's First Piano Concerto, which she played in Vienna in 1869, 12 years after its disastrous premiere there. One of her recital specialties was a piece entitled Rhapsodies. This was a composite of three of Liszt's Hungarian Rhapsodies—Nos. 2, 6 and 12—along with fragments from several others. She also composed various pieces for piano, mainly in a brilliant style, yet referred to her own compositional talent as "miserable."

== Description ==
Liszt described Menter as "my only piano daughter"; he proclaimed that "No woman can touch her" and especially admired her "singing hand." Critic Walter Nieman described her style as "a blend of virtuosity and elegance; a great, round and full Lisztian kind of tone; fiery temperament; a masculine weight on the keys; plasticity; a through-and-through distinguished craft of shape and form; in which soul, spirit and technique are fused in harmony and union."

George Bernard Shaw, who heard Menter in 1890, wrote that she "produces an effect of magnificence which leaves Paderewski far behind ... Mme Menter seems to play with splendid swiftness, yet she never plays faster than the ear can follow, as many players can and do; and it is the distinctness of attack and intention given to each note that makes her execution so irrestibly impetuous."

Pyotr Ilyich Tchaikovsky was also well acquainted with Menter, dedicating the full score of his Concert Fantasia to her (although the earlier piano arrangement is inscribed to Anna Yesipova). While staying in Austria with her in September 1892, he scored her Ungarische Zigeunerweisen (Concerto in the Hungarian Style) for piano and orchestra; he also conducted the work at its premiere in Odessa four months later.

== Selected works ==
=== Piano ===
- Consolation, Op. 10
- Etude in A-Flat, Op. 9
- Mazurka, Op 6
- Petit valse, Op. 7
- Romance, Op. 5
- Sexten-studie, Op. 8
- Tarentelle, Op. 4

== Bibliography ==
- Rieger, Eva, ed. Julie Anne Sadie and Rhian Samuel, "Menter, Sophie", The Norton/Grove Dictionary of Women Composers (New York and London: W. W. Norton & Company, 1995). ISBN 0-393-03487-9.
- Schonberg, Harold C., The Great Pianists (New York: Simon & Schuster, 1987, 1963). ISBN 0-671-64200-6.
