= Indianapolis Symphony Orchestra =

Symphonic orchestra in Indianapolis, Indiana, US

- Orchestra
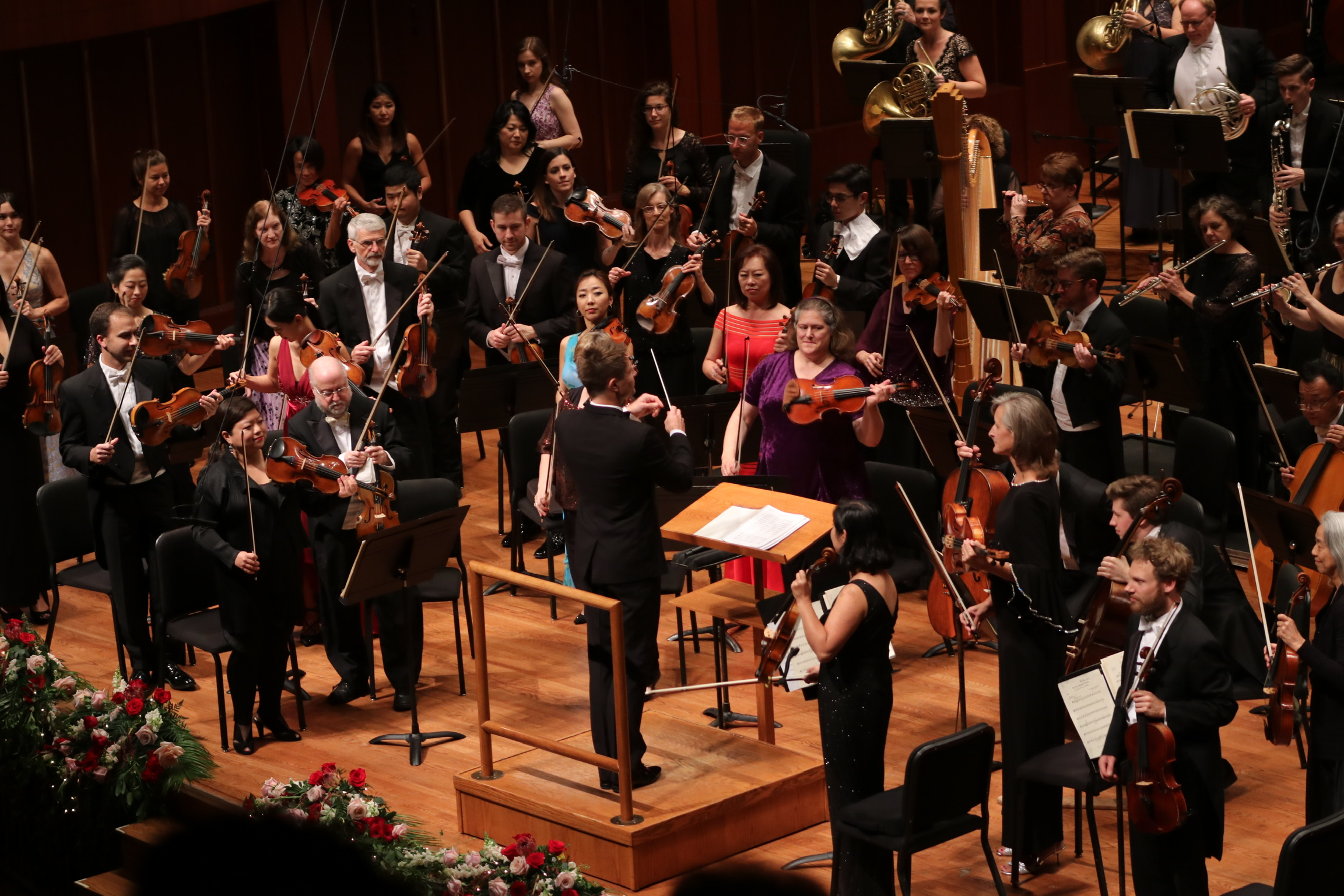
- Indianapolis Symphony Orchestra in 2019
- Short name: ISO
- Founded: 1930
- Concert hall: Hilbert Circle Theatre in Indianapolis, Indiana, U.S.
- Principal conductor: Jun Märkl
- Website: Official website

The Indianapolis Symphony Orchestra (ISO) is a major American orchestra based in Indianapolis, Indiana. The largest performing arts organization in Indiana, the orchestra was founded in 1930 and is based at the Hilbert Circle Theatre in downtown Indianapolis on Monument Circle.

== History ==
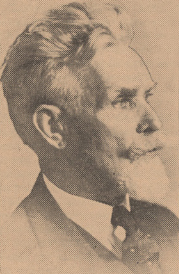
Ferdinand Schaefer, founding music director of the Indianapolis Symphony Orchestra

The orchestra was founded in 1930 by Ferdinand Schaefer, a local violin professor, with the help of Leonard A. Strauss. Strauss became the first president of the ISO. In 1937, Fabien Sevitzky was hired as the orchestra's first music director, as the musicians became fully professional, paid a weekly salary for a 20-week season. The orchestra quickly ascended to national prominence, issuing a series of phonograph recordings on RCA Victor and Capitol Records in the 1940s and early 1950s. Some of the orchestra's earliest recordings have been reissued.

In 1956, Izler Solomon was appointed music director. The orchestra toured nationally and produced a series of international salute concerts. This series won a US State Department Award.

The orchestra performed in such venues as Clowes Hall on the campus of Butler University and Caleb Mills Hall. John Nelson became music director in 1976. During his tenure, the orchestra relocated to the renovated Hilbert Circle Theatre in downtown Indianapolis, which re-opened on October 12, 1984. Nelson brought the ISO back to the airwaves on NPR and PBS, as well as concerts in Carnegie Hall in 1989 and 1991 and at the Kennedy Center. In 1987, he took the orchestra on its first-ever foreign tour in Germany, with concertmaster Hidetaro Suzuki.

Raymond Leppard succeeded Nelson as music director, in 1987. Under Leppard's direction, the orchestra began a 52-week season and made a series of recordings on the Koss Classics label. Leppard returned the orchestra to Europe for two more tours in 1993 and 1997. Leppard became conductor laureate of the orchestra following the conclusion of his tenure in 2001. In 2009, the ISO announced its first-ever ensemble-in-residence, Time for Three.

In April 2010, Krzysztof Urbański first guest conducted the orchestra. He was subsequently engaged for a return appearance in June 2010 at the orchestra's summer series, "Symphony on the Prairie". Based on these two appearances, the ISO named Urbański its 7th music director, effective September 1, 2011, with an initial contract of 4 years. In May 2019, the orchestra announced the scheduled conclusion of Urbański's tenure as music director at the close of the 2020–2021 season.

In May 2021, the orchestra announced the appointment of Jun Märkl as its artistic advisor for the 2021–2022 season. Märkl had first guest-conducted the orchestra in August 2000 in a "Symphony on the Prairie" concert. On January 23, 2024, the orchestra announced the appointment of Märkl as its next music director, effective with the 2024–2025 season, with an initial contract of five seasons. Märkl took the title of music director-designate with immediate effect.

== Music directors ==
- Ferdinand Schaefer (1930–1937)
- Fabien Sevitzky (1937–1955)
- Izler Solomon (1956–1975)
- John Nelson (1976–1987)
- Raymond Leppard (1987–2001)
- Mario Venzago (2002–2009)
- Krzysztof Urbański (2011–2021)
- Jun Märkl (2024–present)

== Principal Pops conductors ==
- Erich Kunzel (1982–2002)
- Jack Everly (2002–present)

== See also ==
- List of symphony orchestras in the United States
- List of attractions and events in Indianapolis
