= Vladimir Fedoseyev =

Russian conductor (born 1932)

- Владимир Федосеев
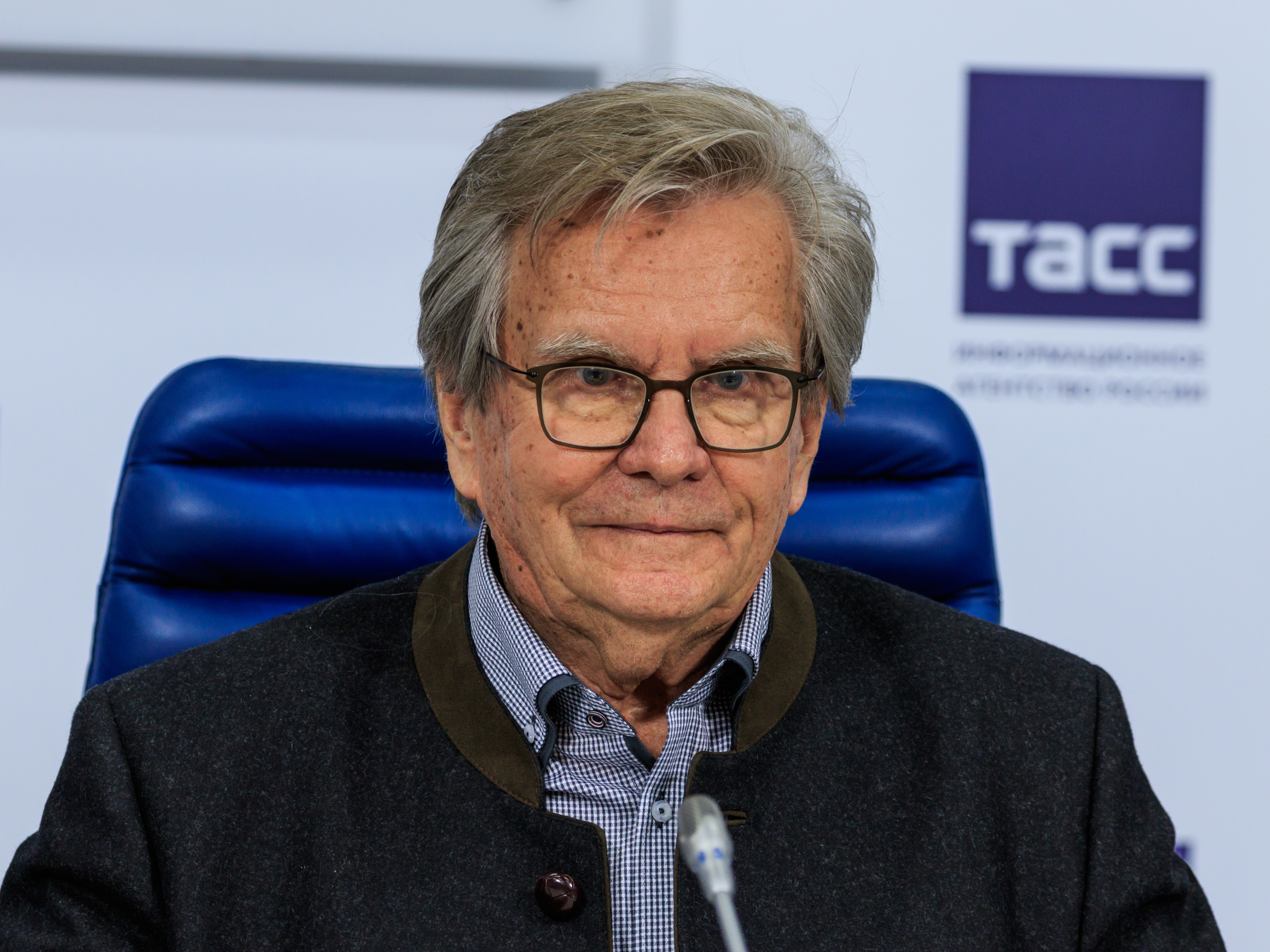
- Fedoseyev in 2017
- Born: 5 August 1932 (age 94); Leningrad, Soviet Union
- Education: Tchaikovsky Symphony Orchestra
- Occupations: Conductor, bayanist, teacher
- Years active: 1959–present
- Awards: USSR State Prize; Glinka State Prize of the RSFSR; Order "For Merit to the Fatherland"

Vladimir Ivanovich Fedoseyev (Russian: Владимир Иванович Федосеев; born 5 August 1932) is a Soviet and Russian conductor, bayanist, teacher. People's Artist of the USSR (1980). Laureate of the USSR State Prize (1989) and the Glinka State Prize of the RSFSR (1970). Full Commander of the Order "For Merit to the Fatherland". Artistic director and chief conductor of the Tchaikovsky Symphony Orchestra since 1974.

== Biography ==
In 1948–1952 he studied at the M. P. Mussorgsky Music College in Leningrad, bayan class, then graduated from the Gnessin State Musical College (1957), in bayan class of N. Chaikin and conducting with N. Reznikov. After graduating from the institute, he entered the USSR Radio Russian Folk Instrument Orchestra as an accordion player, in 1959–1973 – artistic director and chief conductor of the orchestra.

In 1972 Fedoseyev graduated Moscow Conservatory (postgraduate course under Prof. L.M. Ginsburg) From 1974 to 1999, he was artistic director and chief conductor of the Tchaikovsky Symphony Orchestra of Moscow Radio, and from 1997 to 2004 principal conductor of the Vienna Symphony. Since 2006, he has been music director of the Tchaikovsky Symphony Orchestra of Moscow Radio. From 1997 to 2005 – Principal Conductor of the Vienna Symphony Orchestra. Since 1997 he has been a permanent guest conductor of the Zurich Opera House. Since 2000 he has been Principal Guest Conductor of the Tokyo Philharmonic Orchestra. Since 2017 – Musical Director and Principal Guest Conductor of Helikon-Opera in Moscow.

In 2002 – 2003, the Swiss label Relief published a series "Anni in Concordia 1974–1999", primarily reissues of Melodiya recordings, in tribute to Fedoseyev's work with the Tchaikovsky Symphony Orchestra. This series featured (complete with Cyrillic librettos) Russian operas otherwise little known in the West. Since 2004 he has been teaching at the Gnessin Russian Academy at the Department of Opera and Symphony Conducting. Professor.

== Opera productions ==
Directed the production of operas by Russian composers.

Staged the operas Ivan Susanin by Mikhail Glinka (1996), The Demon by Anton Rubinstein (1999), Attila by Giuseppe Verdi (1998, together with director Erwin Piplitz), The Queen of Spades by Pyotr Ilyich Tchaikovsky and the ballet Cinderella by Sergei Prokofiev (2000), Otello by Verdi, Khovanshchina by Modest Mussorgsky (2001), Don Quichotte by Jules Massenet (2003), and Rusalka Antonín Dvořák (2010) at the Zürich Opera House.

In 2012, at the Salzburg Festival, he conducted the opera Cleopatra by Massenet. In 2016, he conducted at La Scala in new productions of the ballets The Nutcracker and The Sleeping Beauty by Tchaikovsky. He also conducted the Historia von D. Johann Fausten by Alfred Schnittke at the Golden Hall of the Musikverein.

== Honors and legacy ==
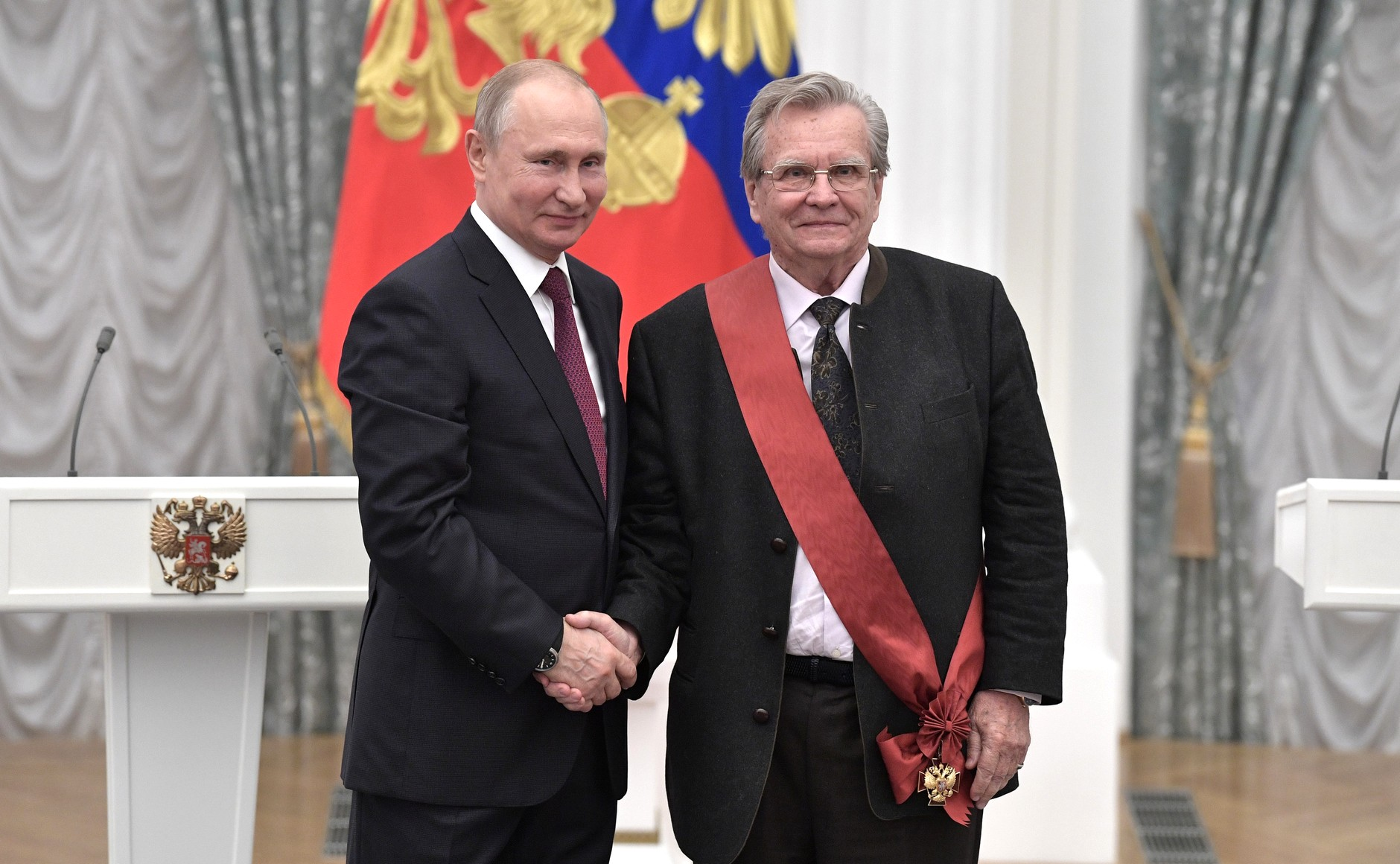
Presentation of the Order "For Merit to the Fatherland", 1st class, 23 May 2019

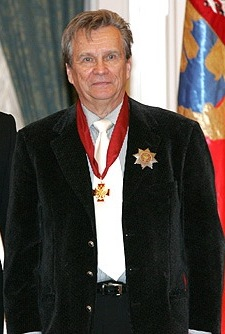
Presentation of the Order "For Merit to the Fatherland", 2nd class, 22 December 2005

- Merited Artist of the RSFSR (11 July 1968) – for services in the field of Soviet musical art
- People's Artist of the RSFSR (26 October 1973) – for great services in the field of Soviet musical art
- People's Artist of the USSR (9 December 1980) – for great services in the development and promotion of Soviet musical art
- State Prize of the RSFSR named M.I. Glinka (1970) – for concert programs (1967–1969)
- USSR State Prize (1989) – for concert programs (1986–1988)
- State Prize of the Russian Federation in the field of culture (17 December 2010)
- Order "For Merit to the Fatherland", 1st degree (30 May 2018) – for a great contribution to the development of national culture and art, the media, many years of fruitful activity
- Order "For Merit to the Fatherland", II degree (29 November 2005) – for an outstanding contribution to the development of national culture and musical art, long-term creative activity
- Order "For Merit to the Fatherland", III degree (26 November 2002) – for an outstanding contribution to the development of Russian musical art
- Order "For Merit to the Fatherland" IV degree (7 June 1996) – for services to the state, many years of fruitful activity in the field of culture and art
- Order of Honor (16 August 2013) – for a great contribution to the development of musical art and many years of creative activity
- Pushkin Medal (4 June 1999) – to commemorate the 200th anniversary of the birth of Alexander Pushkin, for services in the field of culture, education, literature and art
- Medal "In Commemoration of the 850th Anniversary of Moscow"
- Order of Merit, III degree (30 September 1999, Ukraine) – for a significant personal contribution to the development of Ukrainian-Russian cultural ties, significant creative achievements
- Commander's Cross II degree of the badge of honor "For Merit to the Republic of Austria" (1996, Austria)
- Gratitude of the President of the Russian Federation (9 February 2013) – for many years of fruitful work in the Council for Culture and Arts under the President of the Russian Federation
- Order of the Holy Blessed Prince Daniel of Moscow, I degree (2017) – in consideration of his contribution to the establishment of traditional values in society and in connection with the 85th anniversary of his birth
- Medal of the Holy Righteous Philaret the Merciful I degree (2017)
- The badge of distinction "For Services to Moscow" (21 September 2017, Moscow) – for an outstanding contribution to the development of Russian culture and musical art, many years of fruitful creative activity
- Special Prize "Golden Mask" (2019) "For outstanding contribution to the development of theatrical art"
- Order of the Golden Badge of Merit for Services to Vienna (Vienna Magistrate, 2002)
- Prize of the Union State in the field of literature and art (2015–2016) – for the project "Songs of the war years"
- Interstate Prize "Stars of the Commonwealth" (Council for Humanitarian Cooperation of the CIS Member States and the Interstate Fund for Humanitarian Cooperation of the CIS Member States, 2015)
- Award "Legend" (Association of Musical Theaters of Russia, 2017)
- His recording of Rimsky-Korsakov's May Night was awarded Orphée d'Or by the Académie du Disque Lyrique
- The asteroid 7741 Fedoseev was named in his honor.

== Filmography ==
- 2005 – Boris Tchaikovsky. He Lived Captive by Music (documentary)
- 2008 – Alexey Petrenko (from the television documentary series "Islands")

Cultural offices
Preceded by Gennady Rozhdestvensky	Music Director, Tchaikovsky Symphony Orchestra of Moscow Radio; 1974–present	Succeeded by incumbent
