= Andrey Boreyko =

Polish-Russian conductor

- Андре́й Ви́кторович Боре́йко
- Born: 22 July 1957 (age 69); Saint Petersburg
- Education: At the Rimsky-Korsakov Conservatory
- Occupation: Conductor

Andrey Boreyko (Russian: Андре́й Ви́кторович Боре́йко, Andrey Viktorovich Boreyko, Polish: Andrzej Borejko; born 22 July 1957) is a Polish-Russian conductor.

== Biography ==
Boreyko has Polish ancestry on his father's side and Russian ancestry on his mother's side.

Boreyko was born in Saint Petersburg. At the Rimsky-Korsakov Conservatory in Saint Petersburg, Boreyko studied conducting (with Elisabeta Kudriavtseva and Alexander Dmitriev), graduating summa cum laude. In 1987 he won diplomas and prizes at The Grzegorz Fitelberg International Competition for Conductors in Katowice, and he was a prize winner in 1989 at the Kirill Kondrashin conductors' competition in Amsterdam.

Boreyko was music director of the Jena Philharmonic between 1998 and 2003. With the orchestra, Boreyko received awards for the most innovative concert programming in three consecutive seasons from the German music critics (Deutscher Musikverleger-Verband). He now has the title of honorary conductor with the Jena Philharmonic. Boreyko served as principal conductor of the Hamburg Symphony Orchestra (Hamburger Symphoniker) from 2004 until his resignation in November 2007. He was principal conductor of the Bern Symphony Orchestra from 2004 to 2010. In May 2008, Boreyko was announced as the next general music director of the Düsseldorf Symphony Orchestra, effective with the 2009–2010 season, for an initial contract of 5 years. In February 2012, the orchestra announced the scheduled conclusion of Boreyko's Düsseldorf at the end of the 2013–2014 season.

In Canada, Boreyko was principal guest conductor of the Vancouver Symphony Orchestra from 2000 to 2003. He was music director of the Winnipeg Symphony Orchestra from 2001 to 2006. Boreyko received praise for his musicianship during his Winnipeg tenure, and contributed financial assistance to the orchestra during the financially troubled 2002–2003 season.

Boreyko was music director of the National Orchestra of Belgium from 2012 to 2017. He serves as principal guest conductor of the Stuttgart Radio Symphony Orchestra and of the Orquesta Sinfónica de Euskadi. In April 2013, Boreyko was named the next music director for the Naples Philharmonic, in Florida, as of the 2014–2015 season, his first appointment with an orchestra in the United States. He served as music director designate for the 2013–2014 season. Boreyko concluded his tenure with the Naples Philharmonic in 2022.

In September 2018, the Warsaw National Philharmonic Orchestra announced the appointment Boreyko as its next artistic director and music director, effective with the 2019–2020 season. Boreyko is scheduled to conclude his Warsaw National Philharmonic tenure at the close of the 2023–2024 season.

Boreyko's discography includes Arvo Pärt's Lamentate and Valentin Silvestrov's Symphony No. 6, both recorded with the Stuttgart Radio Symphony Orchestra (SWR) for ECM Records. In 2006, Hänssler Classic released a live recording, also with the Stuttgart Radio Symphony Orchestra, of Dmitri Shostakovich’s Symphony No. 4 with the world premiere recording of the Suite, op. 29a from the opera Lady Macbeth of the Mtsensk District, also by Shostakovich.

Cultural offices
Preceded by Andreas Weiser	Chief Conductor, Jena Philharmonic; 1998–2003	Succeeded by Nicholas Milton
Preceded by Yoav Talmi	Music Director, Hamburg Symphony Orchestra; 2004–2007	Succeeded by Jeffrey Tate
Preceded by Dmitri Kitajenko	Bern Symphony Orchestra, Music Director; 2004–2010	Succeeded by Mario Venzago
Preceded by John Fiore	Chief Conductor, Düsseldorf Symphony Orchestra; 2009–2014	Succeeded by Ádám Fischer
Preceded by Jorge Mester	Music Director, Naples Philharmonic Orchestra; 2014–2022	Succeeded by Alexander Shelley (designate, effective 2024)
Preceded by Jacek Kaspszyk	Artistic Director, Warsaw National Philharmonic Orchestra; 2019–present	Succeeded by incumbent
