= Michel Bernstein =

Michel Bernstein (Paris, 1931 – Paris, October 31, 2006) was a French musical producer and founder of several record labels.

Bernstein's first contact with classical music was hearing the school music teacher play Beethoven on an out-of-tune piano at the age of 15, but thereafter he took a lively interest in music and recordings.

== Vendôme ==
Bernstein founded his first record label, Vendôme, in 1954, which released only 5 LPs.

The first release was the world premiere recording of Debussy's Proses Lyriques, by Flore Wend a Swiss soprano living in Paris, accompanied by the pianist Odette Gartenlaub, engineered by André Charlin, and recorded at the Salle Adyar, Paris. The LP also included the Chansons de Bilitis and Ballades de François Villon, and received glowing reviews in the French magazine Disques. The next release was of the organist Pierre Cochereau playing Bach on the organ of the Église Saint-Roch. Followed by another disc of Bach, the Orgelbüchlein, with the Danish organist Finn Viderø.

== Valois ==
His second label, Valois, recorded Sándor Végh and his Végh Quartet, and discs of Clément Janequin and Amours de Ronsard with the Ensemble Polyphonique de Paris of the composer Charles Ravier. Ravier returned to Bernstein in the 1970s to make two recordings of the Meslanges of Lassus, the second of them deeply problematic.

From 1962 until 1972, Valois released about 20 LPs featuring the French harpsichordist Huguette Dreyfus, a pioneer of early music in France. The Paris-based American pianist Noël Lee made many recordings for Valois; Aaron Copland, Ravel, Chopin, and the Brahms quintet with the Quatuor Danois. Then from 1965, chanson and lieder recordings of Ravel, Duparc, Robert Schumann, Mussorgsky, etc. with the Dutch baritone Bernard Kruysen, as well as participating in recordings of Jean Barraqué.

At this period – before the European record market was integrated – many of the releases of Valois were licensed, as Valois licensed their own releases abroad. For example, the Ockeghem Requiem of the Prague Madrigalists conducted by Miroslav Venhoda, was licensed from Supraphon to both Valois in France and Telefunken in Germany.

Valois was sold to Auvidis in the early 1990s, and subsequently became property of Naïve Records when Naïve acquired Auvidis in 1998.

== Astrée ==
In 1975 Bernstein founded his third label, Astrée. The focus of the label was on 17th Century French music, for organ, harpsichord, viol and lute. The motto of the label was Deffense & Illvstration de la Mvsiqve Française, parodying the manifesto of Joachim du Bellay for poetry, and printed on the first 39 discs released.

Astrée, along with Harmonia Mundi of Bernard Coutaz was one of the leaders in early music recording in France, with artists including harpsichordist Blandine Verlet, fortepianist Paul Badura-Skoda, lutenist Hopkinson Smith, Michel Chapuis for the complete organ works of Bach, the first recordings of Philippe Herreweghe, Quatuor Mosaïques, Rinaldo Alessandrini and others, including two "difficult" recordings with Esther Lamandier around the Decameron and Cantigas de Santa Maria.

One of the label's major artists was Jordi Savall whom Bernstein recruited from EMI, generating a series of recordings of renaissance to classical repertoire including the bestselling soundtrack for the 1991 movie Tous les matins du monde. However Bernstein had already in 1985 sold control of Astrée to Auvidis, which was then purchased by Naïve, which shortly after also acquired Yolanta Skura's label Opus111. Most of Astrée's artists remained with Auvidis-Naïve, though Jordi Savall departed to found his own label, Alia Vox, eventually purchasing rights to his own back-catalogue.

== Arcana ==
In 1992, Bernstein founded his fourth label, Arcana, in Nantes. A few artists such as Rinaldo Alessandrini and Fabio Biondi assisted Bernstein in making recordings without payment to help the new label get started.

Again Arcana concentrated on early music, with new artists Ars Antiqua Austria, the Festetics Quartet, La Reverdie and Dialogos. Arcana also released the first recording of Debussy on period instruments with chamber works performed by the Kuijken family.

Following Bernstein's marriage to philosopher and sound engineer Charlotte Gilart de Keranflec'h the label's publications began to bear the imprint Charlotte et Michel Bernstein Éditeurs.

Bernstein suffered a heart attack and died while setting up the microphones for a recording session for Dialogos, of repertoire connected with Abbo of Fleury.

After a hiatus in activity, since January 2008 the Arcana label has been managed by 551 Media S.r.l., Omegna, Italy, with the reissue of recordings by Mala Punica, Crawford Young and the Ferrara Ensemble, and new recording began again in 2009 with a disc by La Reverdie, Sacri Sarcasmi. The label subsequently passed into the portfolio of Outhere.
