= Alphons Diepenbrock =

Dutch composer, essayist, and classicist

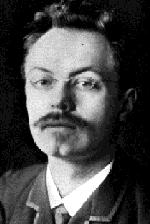
Alphons Diepenbrock.

Alphonsus Johannes Maria Diepenbrock (2 September 1862 in Amsterdam – 5 April 1921) was a Dutch composer, essayist and classicist.

== Life and work ==
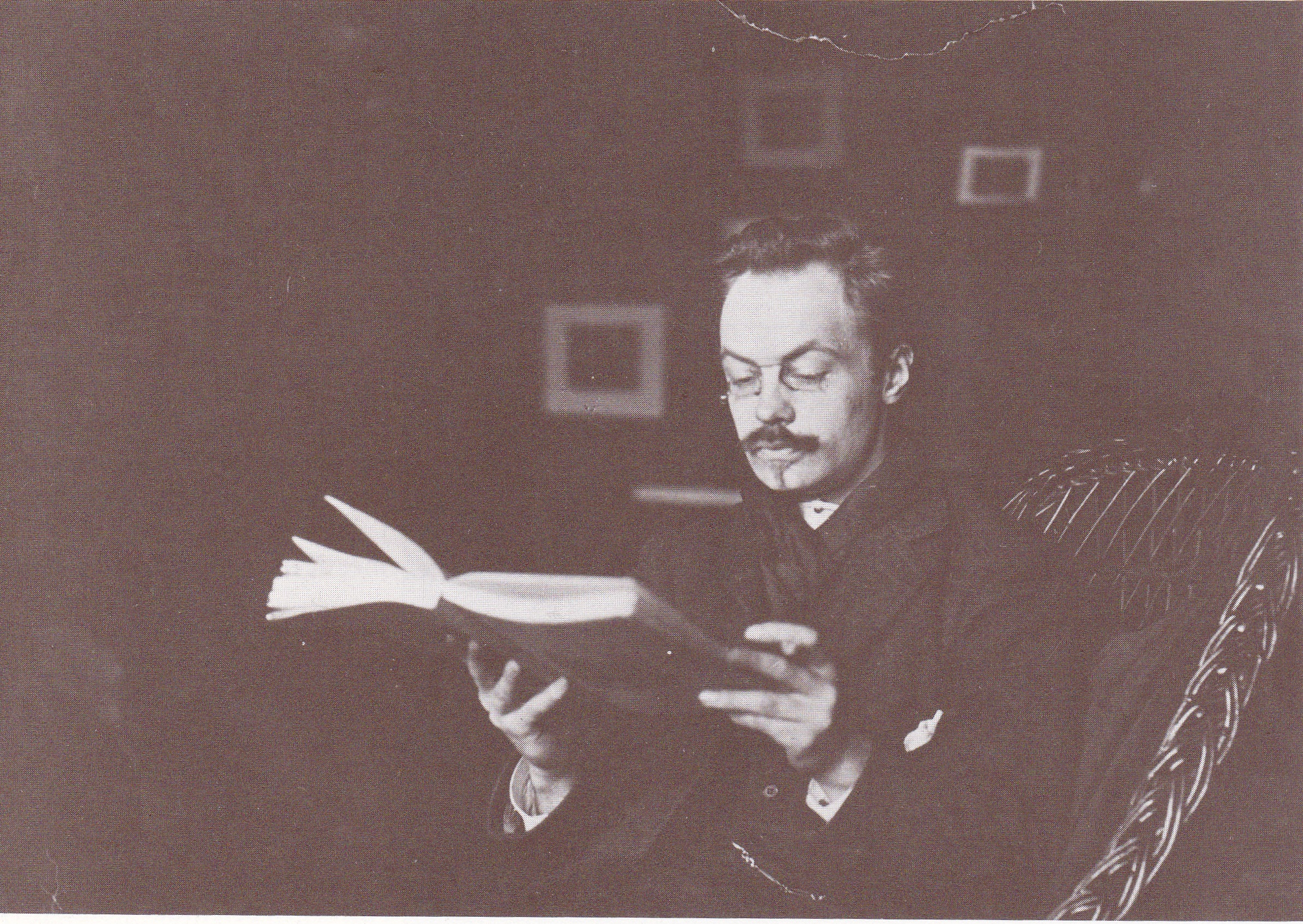
Diepenbrock reading in Witsen's studio (1891)

Diepenbrock was not a musician by training. He was brought up in a prosperous Catholic family. Although he showed musical ability as a child, the expectation was that he would enter a university rather than a conservatory. He studied classics at the University of Amsterdam, gaining his doctorate cum laude in 1888 with a dissertation in Latin on the life of Seneca. The same year he became a teacher, a job which he held until 1894, and decided to devote himself to music. As a composer, he had been completely self-taught from an early age.

He created a musical idiom which, in a highly personal manner, combined 16th-century polyphony with Wagnerian chromaticism, to which in later years was added the impressionistic refinement that he encountered in Debussy's music.

His predominantly vocal output is distinguished by the quality of the texts used. Apart from the Ancient Greek dramatists and the Roman Rite of the Catholic Church, he was inspired by, among others, Goethe, Novalis, Vondel, Brentano, Hölderlin, Heine, Nietzsche, Baudelaire and Verlaine.

As a conductor, he performed many contemporary works, including Gustav Mahler's Fourth Symphony (at the Concertgebouw) as well as works by Fauré and Debussy. Diepenbrock is one of the Dutch composers whose name is displayed on the first balcony of the Amsterdam Concertgebouw.

Throughout his life, Diepenbrock continued his non-musical interests, remaining a classics tutor and publishing works on literature, painting, politics, philosophy and religion. During his lifetime, his musical skills were often overlooked. Nonetheless, Diepenbrock was a respected figure within musical circles. He counted amongst his friends Mahler, Richard Strauss and Arnold Schoenberg.

Alphons Diepenbrock is related to Cardinal Melchior von Diepenbrock, who was his great uncle, as well as to a branch of the family that immigrated to America in 1879.

On 8 August 1895 in Rosmalen, he married Lady Wilhelmina Elisabeth Cornelia Petronella de Jong van Beek en Donk.

== Works and discography ==
- Ave Maria, RC 23 (1880)
  - Christa Pfeiler (mezz. sop.), Rudolf Jansen (piano), Alphons Diepenbrock—Songs 3, NM Classics 92052 (1996), Alphons Diepenbrock—Complete Songs, Brilliant Classics 96103 (2021)
- De klare dag, RC 4 (1881)
  - Christoph Prégardien (ten.), Rudolf Jansen (piano), Alphons Diepenbrock—Songs 3, NM Classics 92052 (1996), Alphons Diepenbrock—Anniversary Edition, Et'Cetera KTC 1435 (2012), Alphons Diepenbrock—Complete Songs, Brilliant Classics 96103 (2021)
- Avondzang, RC 13 “Het zuidewindje suist” (1885)
  - Christoph Prégardien, Rudolf Jansen (piano), Alphons Diepenbrock—Songs 3, NM Classics 92052 (1996), Alphons Diepenbrock—Anniversary Edition, Et'Cetera KTC 1435 (2012), Alphons Diepenbrock—Complete Songs, Brilliant Classics 96103 (2021)
- Meinacht, RC 14 “Ik zag in ’t grondloos blauw de sterren vonken” (1885)
  - Jard van Nes (mezz. sop.), Rudolf Jansen (piano), Alphons Diepenbrock—Songs 3, NM Classics 92052 (1996), Alphons Diepenbrock—Anniversary Edition, Et'Cetera KTC 1435 (2012), Alphons Diepenbrock—Complete Songs, Brilliant Classics 96103 (2021)
- Maanlicht, RC 15 “O geur’ger heft zich ied’re bloeme” (1885)
  - Christoph Prégardien (ten.), Rudolf Jansen (piano), Alphons Diepenbrock—Songs 3, NM Classics 92052 (1996), Alphons Diepenbrock—Anniversary Edition, Et'Cetera KTC 1435 (2012), Alphons Diepenbrock—Complete Songs, Brilliant Classics 96103 (2021)
- Drei Ballades, op. 1 (1885)
  - 1. Entsagung
  - 2. Der Fischer
  - 3. Der Abend kommt gezogen
  - Christoph Pregardien, tenor, Rudolph Jenson, piano, Alphons Diepenbrock—Songs I, NM Classics 92050 (1992), Alphons Diepenbrock—Anniversary Edition, Et'Cetera KTC 1435 (2012), Alphons Diepenbrock—Complete Songs, Brilliant Classics 96103 (2021)
- Avondzang (1885, 1903)
  - Lode (Louis) Devos, ten., Promenade Orchestra, Benedict Silberman, cond., Alphons Diepenbrock—Anniversary Edition, Et'Cetera KTC 1435 (2012)
- Der Liebende schreibt (1887)
  - Roberta Alexander, sop., Rudolph Jenson, piano, Alphons Diepenbrock—Songs I, NM Classics 92050 (1992), Alphons Diepenbrock—Anniversary Edition, Et'Cetera KTC 1435 (2012), Alphons Diepenbrock—Complete Songs, Brilliant Classics 96103 (2021)
- Zwei Gesänge, op. 2 (1889)
  - Mignon
  - Der König in Thule (Goethe), song (orchestrated 1907)
    - Jard van Nes, mezzo sop., Rudolph Jenson, piano, Alphons Diepenbrock—Songs I, NM Classics 92050 (1992), Alphons Diepenbrock—Anniversary Edition, Et'Cetera KTC 1435 (2012), Alphons Diepenbrock—Complete Songs, Brilliant Classics 96103 (2021)
    - Konig, Hans Christoph Begeman, Sinfonieorchester St. Gallen, Otto Tausk, Alphons Diepenbrock—Orchestral Songs, CPO 777 836-2 (2014)
- Es war ein alter König (Heine) (1890)
  - Robert Holl, bass bar., Rudolph Jenson, piano, Alphons Diepenbrock—Songs I, NM Classics 92050 (1992), Alphons Diepenbrock—Anniversary Edition, Et'Cetera KTC 1435 (2012), Alphons Diepenbrock—Complete Songs, Brilliant Classics 96103 (2021)
  - Hans Christoph Begeman, Sinfonieorchester St. Gallen, Otto Tausk, Alphons Diepenbrock—Orchestral Songs, CPO 777 836-2 (2014)
- La chanson de l’hypertrophique, RC 32 “C’est d’un’ maladie de coeur”
  - Roberta Alexander (sop.), Rudolf Jansen (piano), Alphons Diepenbrock—Songs 2, NM Classics 92051 (1996), Alphons Diepenbrock—Complete Songs, Brilliant Classics 96103 (2021)
- Missa in die festo (1891, orchestrated version 1913)
  - Deniz Yilmaz, ten., Leo van Doeselaar, organ, men of the Netherlands Radio Choir, Sigvards Klava, cond., Alphons Diepenbrock—Anniversary Edition, Et'Cetera KTC 1435 (2012)
  - orchestrated version, Kyrie and Gloria, Elisabeth Lugt, sop., Martha van Kerkoff, alto, Tom Brand, tenor, Laurens Bogtman, bass, Netherlands Radio Choir, Toonkunst Choir Amsterdam, Apollo Choir Soest, Royal Concertgebouw Orchestra, Bernard Haitink, cond. (1961), Alphons Diepenbrock—Anniversary Edition, Et'Cetera KTC 1435 (2012)
- Reyzangen uit Gysbrecht van Aemstel for choir and orchestra (1892–95)
  - Maja Roodveldt, sop., Sophie Hoofboom, mezzo, Frank Hameleers, tenor, Henk van Heijnsbergen, bass, Netherlands Radio Choir, Netherlands Radio Symphony Orchestra, Ed Spanjaard, cond., Alphons Diepenbrock and the Golden Age, Composers Voice Classics CV 121 (2004); Alphons Diepenbrock—Anniversary Edition, Et'Cetera KTC 1435 (2012)
- Hinüber wall’ ich (1894)
  - Roberta Alexander, sop., Rudolph Jenson, piano, Alphons Diepenbrock—Songs I, NM Classics 92050 (1992), Alphons Diepenbrock—Complete Songs, Brilliant Classics 96103 (2021)
- Caelestis Urbs Jerusalem (1897)
  - Netherlands Chamber Choir, Uwe Gronostay, Requiem, NM Classics 92039 (1994)
- Te Deum (1897)
  - Laudamus, Toonkunst Choir Amsterdam, Royal Concertgebouw Orchestra, Eduard van Beinum, Alphons Diepenbrock—Anniversary Edition, Et'Cetera KTC 1435 (2012)
- Chanson d'autumne (Verlaine) for chorus a capella (1898)
  - Netherlands Chamber Choir, Uwe Gronostay, cond., Vox Neerlandica II, NM Classics 92065 (1997), reissued as Et'Cetera KTC 1387 (2009), Alphons Diepenbrock—Anniversary Edition, Et'Cetera KTC 1435 (2012)
- Ik ben in eenzaamheid niet meer alleen (1898)
  - Lode (Louis) Devos, ten., Promenade Orchestra, Benedict Silberman, cond., Alphons Diepenbrock—Anniversary Edition, Et'Cetera KTC 1435 (2012)
- Hymne für Geige und Orchester (Hymn for Violin and Orchestra) (1898), and Hymne voor orchest
  - Emmy Verhey, violin, Het Residentie Orkest den Haag (Hague Philharmonic), Hans Vonk cond., Alphons Diepenbrock, Vol. 1, Orchestral Works, Chandos 8821 (1990); Alphons Diepenbrock—Anniversary Edition, Et'Cetera KTC 1435 (2012); Brilliant Classics 93412 (2017)
  - Sinfonieorchester St. Gallen, Otto Tausk, Alphons Diepenbrock—Orchestral Songs, CPO 777 836-2 (2014)
- Lied der Spinnerin (Brentano) (1898) (later arranged by the composer for strings and horn)
  - Roberta Alexander, sop., Rudolph Jenson, piano, Alphons Diepenbrock—Songs I, NM Classics 92050 (1992), Alphons Diepenbrock—Anniversary Edition, Et'Cetera KTC 1435 (2012), Alphons Diepenbrock—Complete Songs, Brilliant Classics 96103 (2021)
- Ecoutez la chanson bien douce, RC 40 (1898, 1907)
  - Renee Defraiteeur, sop., Netherlands Radio Orchestra (Omroeporkest), Maurits van den Berg, cond., Alphons Diepenbrock—Anniversary Edition, Et'Cetera KTC 1435 (2012)
  - Roberta Alexander (sop.), Rudolf Jansen (piano), Alphons Diepenbrock—Songs 2, NM Classics 92051 (1996), Alphons Diepenbrock—Complete Songs, Brilliant Classics 96103 (2021)
- Ik ben in eenzaamheid niet meer alleen, RC 41 (1898)
  - Roberta Alexander (sop.), Rudolf Jansen (piano), Alphons Diepenbrock—Songs 3, NM Classics 92052 (1996), Alphons Diepenbrock—Complete Songs, Brilliant Classics 96103 (2021)
- Clair de lune, RC 43 Votre âme est un paysage choisi (1898, 1907)
  - Renee Defraiteeur, sop., Netherlands Radio Orchestra (Omroeporkest), Maurits van den Berg, cond., Alphons Diepenbrock—Anniversary Edition, Et'Cetera KTC 1435 (2012)
  - Roberta Alexander (sop.), Rudolf Jansen (piano), Alphons Diepenbrock—Songs 2, NM Classics 92051 (1996), Alphons Diepenbrock—Anniversary Edition, Et'Cetera KTC 1435 (2012), Alphons Diepenbrock—Complete Songs, Brilliant Classics 96103 (2021)
- Wenige wissen das Geheimnis de Liebe (1898, 1902)
  - Christoph Hombert, ten., Het Residentie Orkest den Haag (Hague Philharmonic), Hans Vonk cond., Alphons Diepenbrock—Anniversary Edition, Et'Cetera KTC 1435 (2012)
- Hymne an die Nacht (Novalis) (1899) (regarded by Gustav Mahler as Diepenbrock's best)
  - Nr. 1, Gehoben ist der Stein (1915 revision), Arleen Auger, sop., Royal Concertgebouw Orchestra, Riccardo Chailly, cond. (1990), Alphons Diepenbrock, Donemus Composers' Voice Recordings CV 50 (1995); Alphons Diepenbrock—Anniversary Edition, Et'Cetera KTC 1435 (2012)
  - Nr. 2, Muß immer der Morgen wiederkommen?, Linda Finnie, mezzo-sop., Het Residentie Orkest den Haag (Hague Philharmonic), Hans Vonk cond., Alphons Diepenbrock, Vol. 2, Symphonic Songs, Chandos 8878 (1990); Alphons Diepenbrock—Anniversary Edition, Et'Cetera KTC 1435 (2012); Brilliant Classics 93412 (2017)
  - Nr. 2, Nathalie Stutzmann, alto, Riccardo Chailly, cond., Royal Concertgebouw Orchestra, Anthology of the Royal Concertgebouw Orchestra, vol. 6, 1990-2000, RCO Live 11004 (2011)
  - Hans Christoph Begeman, Sinfonieorchester St. Gallen, Otto Tausk, Alphons Diepenbrock—Orchestral Songs, CPO 777 836-2 (2014)
- Zij sluimert (1900, 1903)
  - Lode (Louis) Devos, ten., Promenade Orchestra, Benedict Silberman, cond., Alphons Diepenbrock—Anniversary Edition, Et'Cetera KTC 1435 (2012)
- Kann ich im Busen heisse Wünsche tragen? (Karoline von Günderrode) (1902)
  - Jard van Nes, mezzo sop., Rudolph Jenson, piano, Alphons Diepenbrock—Songs I, NM Classics 92050 (1992), Alphons Diepenbrock—Anniversary Edition, Et'Cetera KTC 1435 (2012), Alphons Diepenbrock—Complete Songs, Brilliant Classics 96103 (2021)
- Vondels vaart naar Agrippine (1903)
- Hymne aan Rembrandt, for soprano, female choir, and orchestra (1906)
  - Eva-Marie Westbroek, sop., Netherlands Radio Choir, Netherlands Radio Symphony Orchestra, Ed Spanjaard, cond., Alphons Diepenbrock and the Golden Age, Composers Voice Classics CV 121 (2004); Alphons Diepenbrock—Anniversary Edition, Et'Cetera KTC 1435 (2012)
- Im grossen Schweigen, five songs for baritone and orchestra (1906)
  - Robert Holl, bass, Het Residentie Orkest den Haag (Hague Philharmonic), Hans Vonk cond., Alphons Diepenbrock, Vol. 2, Symphonic Songs, Chandos 8878 (1990); Alphons Diepenbrock—Anniversary Edition, Et'Cetera KTC 1435 (2012); Brilliant Classics 93412 (2017)
  - Hans Christoph Begeman, Sinfonieorchester St. Gallen, Otto Tausk, Alphons Diepenbrock—Orchestral Songs, CPO 777 836-2 (2014)
- Les chats (1906–07)
  - Bernard Kruysen, bar., Netherlands Radio Orchestra, Maurits van den Berg, Netherlands Radio Philharmonic Orchestra, Willem van Otterloo, cond., Alphons Diepenbrock—Anniversary Edition, Et'Cetera KTC 1435 (2012)
  - Robert Holl, bass bar., Rudolph Jenson, piano, Alphons Diepenbrock—Songs 2, NM Classics 92051 (1996), Alphons Diepenbrock—Anniversary Edition, Et'Cetera KTC 1435 (2012), Alphons Diepenbrock—Complete Songs, Brilliant Classics 96103 (2021)
- Recueillement, Sois sage, ô ma Douleur, et tiens-toi plus tranquille I & II, RC 79 (1907)
  - Bernard Kruysen, bar., Netherlands Radio Philharmonic Orchestra, Willem van Otterloo, cond., Alphons Diepenbrock—Anniversary Edition, Et'Cetera KTC 1435 (2012)
  - Robert Holl (bass), Rudolf Jansen (piano), Alphons Diepenbrock—Songs 2, NM Classics 92051 (1996), Alphons Diepenbrock—Anniversary Edition, Et'Cetera KTC 1435 (2012), Alphons Diepenbrock—Complete Songs, Brilliant Classics 96103 (2021)
- Auf dem See (Goethe) for chorus a capella (1908)
  - Netherlands Chamber Choir, Uwe Gronostay, cond., Vox Neerlandica II, NM Classics 92065 (1997), reissued as Et'Cetera KTC 1387 (2009), Alphons Diepenbrock—Anniversary Edition, Et'Cetera KTC 1435 (2012)
- Der Abend (Brentano) (1908)
  - Roberta Alexander, sop., Rudolph Jenson, piano, Alphons Diepenbrock—Songs I, NM Classics 92050 (1992), Alphons Diepenbrock—Anniversary Edition, Et'Cetera KTC 1435 (2012), Alphons Diepenbrock—Complete Songs, Brilliant Classics 96103 (2021)
- Liebesklage (1908)
  - Jard van Nes, mezzo sop., Rudolph Jenson, piano, Alphons Diepenbrock—Songs I, NM Classics 92050 (1992), Alphons Diepenbrock—Anniversary Edition, Et'Cetera KTC 1435 (2012), Alphons Diepenbrock—Complete Songs, Brilliant Classics 96103 (2021)
- Celebretät (1908)
  - Robert Holl, bass bar., Rudolph Jenson, piano, Alphons Diepenbrock—Songs I, NM Classics 92050 (1992), Alphons Diepenbrock—Anniversary Edition, Et'Cetera KTC 1435 (2012), Alphons Diepenbrock—Complete Songs, Brilliant Classics 96103 (2021)
- Puisque l'aube grandit, RC 97 (1909, 1916)
  - Bernard Kruysen, bar., Netherlands Radio Philharmonic Orchestra, Willem van Otterloo, cond., Alphons Diepenbrock—Anniversary Edition, Et'Cetera KTC 1435 (2012)
  - Christa Pfeiler (mezz. sop.), Rudolf Jansen (piano), Alphons Diepenbrock—Songs 2, NM Classics 92051 (1996), Alphons Diepenbrock—Anniversary Edition, Et'Cetera KTC 1435 (2012), Alphons Diepenbrock—Complete Songs, Brilliant Classics 96103 (2021)
- Mandoline, RC 99 “Les donneurs de sérénades” (1909)
  - Roberta Alexander (sop.), Rudolf Jansen (piano), Alphons Diepenbrock—Songs 2, NM Classics 92051 (1996), Alphons Diepenbrock—Complete Songs, Brilliant Classics 96103 (2021)
  - Claron McFadden (sop.), Leo van Doeselaar (piano), Alphons Diepenbrock—Anniversary Edition, Et'Cetera KTC 1435 (2012)
- En sourdine (Verlaine), RC 104 “Calmes dans le demi-jour”, song for mezzo and piano (1910)
  - Hans Christoph Begeman, Sinfonieorchester St. Gallen, Otto Tausk, Alphons Diepenbrock—Orchestral Songs, CPO 777 836-2 (2014)
  - Jard van Alexander (sop.), Rudolf Jansen (piano), Alphons Diepenbrock—Songs 2, NM Classics 92051 (1996), Alphons Diepenbrock—Anniversary Edition, Et'Cetera KTC 1435 (2012), Alphons Diepenbrock—Complete Songs, Brilliant Classics 96103 (2021)
- Marsyas (1910)
  - Concert suite, Het Residentie Orkest den Haag (Hague Philharmonic), Hans Vonk cond., Alphons Diepenbrock, Vol. 1, Orchestral Works, Chandos 8821 (1990); Alphons Diepenbrock—Anniversary Edition, Et'Cetera KTC 1435 (2012); Brilliant Classics 93412 (2017)
  - La source enchantée, Concert Suite (1920), Antony Hermus, Bamberger Symphoniker, Alphons Diepenbrock, Symphonic Poems, CPO 777 927-2 (2016)
- Die Nacht, three songs for alto and orchestra (1911)
  - Linda Finnie, mezzo-sop., Het Residentie Orkest den Haag (Hague Philharmonic), Hans Vonk cond., Alphons Diepenbrock, Vol. 2, Symphonic Songs, Chandos 8878 (1990); Alphons Diepenbrock—Anniversary Edition, Et'Cetera KTC 1435 (2012); Brilliant Classics 93412 (2017)
  - Janet Baker, sop., Royal Concertgebouw Orchestra, Bernard Haitink, cond., Alphons Diepenbrock—Anniversary Edition, Et'Cetera KTC 1435 (2012)
- Zij sluimert, RC 51 “Zij rust in ’t malsche mos en houdt gebogen” (1910)
  - Christoph Prégardien (ten.), Rudolf Jansen (piano), Alphons Diepenbrock—Songs 3, NM Classics 92052 (1996), Alphons Diepenbrock—Anniversary Edition, Et'Cetera KTC 1435 (2012), Alphons Diepenbrock—Complete Songs, Brilliant Classics 96103 (2021)
- Gijsbreght van Aemstel (1912)
- Lydische Nacht (Lydian Night) (for spoken voice and orchestra) (Verhagen) (1913)
  - arranged as a symphonic poem by Eduard Reeser 1983, rev. 1992, Royal Concertgebouw Orchestra, Hans Vonk cond. (1984), Anthology of the Royal Concertgebouw Orchestra, vol. 5, 1980-1990, RCO Live 08005 (2009)
- Berceuse, RC 112 “Le Seigneur a dit à son enfant” (1912)
  - Jard van Alexander (sop.), Rudolf Jansen (piano), Alphons Diepenbrock—Songs 2, NM Classics 92051 (1996), Alphons Diepenbrock—Complete Songs, Brilliant Classics 96103 (2021)
  - Elly Ameling (sop.), Richte van der Meer (cello), Dalton Baldwin (piano), Alphons Diepenbrock—Anniversary Edition, Et'Cetera KTC 1435 (2012)
- L’invitation au voyage, RC 117 “Mon enfant, ma soeur” (1913)
  - Christa Pfeiler (mezz. sop.), Rudolf Jansen (piano), Alphons Diepenbrock—Songs 2, NM Classics 92051 (1996), Alphons Diepenbrock—Anniversary Edition, Et'Cetera KTC 1435 (2012), Alphons Diepenbrock—Complete Songs, Brilliant Classics 96103 (2021)
- Simeon's Lofzang, RC 120 “Vergun, o God, op zijne bede” (1912, rev. 1914)
  - Robert Holl (bass), RJ, Alphons Diepenbrock—Songs 3, NM Classics 92052 (1996), Alphons Diepenbrock—Complete Songs, Brilliant Classics 96103 (2021)
- Avondschemer (for piano) (1915)
  - David Kuyken, piano, Alphons Diepenbrock—Anniversary Edition, Et'Cetera KTC 1435 (2012)
- Incantation, RC 132 “Mets ta main dans ma main” (1916)
  - Christa Pfeiler (mezz. sop.), Rudolf Jansen (piano), Alphons Diepenbrock—Songs 2, NM Classics 92051 (1996), Alphons Diepenbrock—Anniversary Edition, Et'Cetera KTC 1435 (2012), Alphons Diepenbrock—Complete Songs, Brilliant Classics 96103 (2021)
- Zegeklanken (for carillon) (1916)
- De Vogels (The Birds) (1917)
  - Overture, Het Residentie Orkest den Haag (Hague Philharmonic), Hans Vonk cond., Alphons Diepenbrock, Vol. 1, Orchestral Works, Chandos 8821 (1990); Alphons Diepenbrock—Anniversary Edition, Et'Cetera KTC 1435 (2012); Brilliant Classics 93412 (2017)
  - Overture, Royal Concertgebouw Orchestra, Riccardo Chailly cond. (1989), Alphons Diepenbrock, Donemus Composers' Voice Recordings CV 50 (1995)
  - Overture, Antony Hermus, Bamberger Symphoniker, Alphons Diepenbrock, Symphonic Poems, CPO 777 927-2 (2016)
- Beiaard, RC 129 (1917)
  - Christa Pfeiler (mezz. sop.), Rudolf Jansen (piano), Alphons Diepenbrock—Songs 3, NM Classics 92052 (1996), Alphons Diepenbrock—Complete Songs, Brilliant Classics 96103 (2021)
- Preghiera alla Madonna, RC 137 “Ricordatevi, o pietosissima vergine Maria” (1902, rev. 1917)
  - Christoph Prégardien (ten.), Rudolf Jansen (piano), Alphons Diepenbrock—Songs 3, NM Classics 92052 (1996), Alphons Diepenbrock—Anniversary Edition, Et'Cetera KTC 1435 (2012), Alphons Diepenbrock—Complete Songs, Brilliant Classics 96103 (2021)
- Come raggio di sol, RC 138 (1917)
  - Roberta Alexander (sop.), Rudolf Jansen (piano), Alphons Diepenbrock—Songs 3, NM Classics 92052 (1996), Alphons Diepenbrock—Complete Songs, Brilliant Classics 96103 (2021)
  - Claron McFadden (sop.), Leo van Doeselaar (piano), Alphons Diepenbrock—Anniversary Edition, Et'Cetera KTC 1435 (2012)
- Elektra (1920)
  - Symphonic suite (1920), Het Residentie Orkest den Haag (Hague Philharmonic), Hans Vonk cond., Alphons Diepenbrock, Vol. 1, Orchestral Works, Chandos 8821 (1990); Alphons Diepenbrock—Anniversary Edition, Et'Cetera KTC 1435 (2012); Brilliant Classics 93412 (2017)
  - Symphonic suite (arr. Eduard Reeser), Royal Concertgebouw Orchestra, Riccardo Chailly cond. (1993), Alphons Diepenbrock, Donemus Composers' Voice Recordings CV 50 (1995)
  - Symphonic Suite (1920), Antony Hermus, Bamberger Symphoniker, Alphons Diepenbrock, Symphonic Poems, CPO 777 927-2 (2016)
- Hymne: Wenige wissen das Geheimnis der Liebe, three songs for voice and organ (or orchestra)
  - Christoph Homberger, tenor, Het Residentie Orkest den Haag (Hague Philharmonic), Hans Vonk cond., Alphons Diepenbrock, Vol. 2, Symphonic Songs, Chandos 8878 (1990); Brilliant Classics 93412 (2017)
- Misc. works for Chamber Choir (1884-1912), Netherlands Chamber Choir, conducted by Hartmut Haenschen, Uwe Gronostay, Ed Spanjaard, Celso Antunes, Klaas Stok, Alphons Diepenbrock—Anniversary Edition, Et'Cetera KTC 1435 (2012)
- Misc. songs
  - Songs for voice and orchestra, Annete de la Bije, Renee Defraiteeur, Lode Devos, Christoph Hombert, Bernard Kruysen, Netherlands Radio Orchestra, Maurits van den Berg, Netherlands Radio Philharmonic Orchestra, Willem van Otterloo, Promenade Orchestra, Benedict Silberman, Het Residentie Orkest den Haag (Hague Philharmonic), Hans Vonk cond., Alphons Diepenbrock—Anniversary Edition, Et'Cetera KTC 1435 (2012)
