= Binetti =

Binetti is a surname. Notable people with this surname include:

- Cosimo Binetti, member of Italian progressive metal/power metal band The Dogma
- Damiano Binetti (born 1968), Italian conductor
- Laura Binetti (born 1965), Canadian bodybuilder
- Paola Binetti (born 1943), Italian politician
- Steve Binetti (born 1966), German composer and musician
