= Budějovice =

Budějovice may refer to:

- České Budějovice, a city in Bohemia, Czech Republic
- Moravské Budějovice, a town in Moravia, Czech Republic
