= Jean Rondeau =

Jean Rondeau may refer to:

- Jean Rondeau (racing driver) (1946–1985), French automobile racer and constructor
- Jean Rondeau (musician) (born 1991), French harpsichordist
