= Suzanne Haik =

Suzanne Haik could refer to:

- Suzanne Haik Terrell (born 1954), American politician
- Suzanne Haïk-Vantoura (1912–2000), French organist and composer
