= Jean Rondeau (musician) =

French harpsichordist and pianist

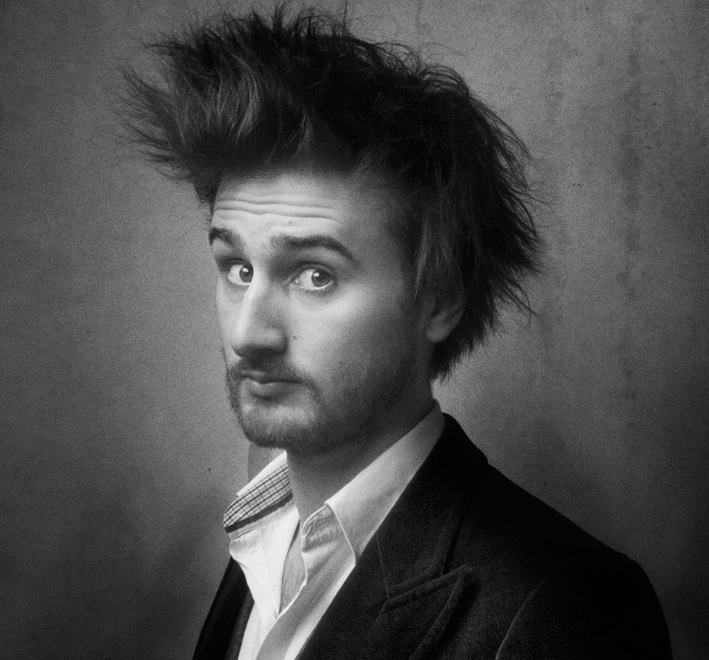
- Born: 23 April 1991 (age 35); France
- Occupations: Harpsichordist; Pianist
- Website: jean-rondeau.com

Jean Rondeau (born 23 April 1991) is a French harpsichordist and pianist. He was taught by Blandine Verlet from an early age. He studied at the Conservatoire National Supérieur de Musique in Paris and the Guildhall School of Music in London. He won the Young Soloist award in the 2014 Prix des Radios Francophones Publiques. He has released several solo albums.

== Early life and education ==
Variously described as a "prodigy", a "badass virtuoso", and a classical music "sex symbol", Jean Rondeau began playing harpsichord at age six having first heard the instrument on the radio and declaring to his parents "I really want to make that sound". He spent a decade studying under Blandine Verlet. He studied at the Paris Conservatoire and undertook further study at Guildhall School of Music, where he was taught by Carole Cerasi and James Johnstone. In 2012 Rondeau won first place in the harpsichord competition at the Musica Antiqua Festival in Bruges, Belgium. The same year he was given the European Union's EUBO Development Trust Prize and won second-place at the Prague Spring International Music Festival harpsichord competition.

== Career ==
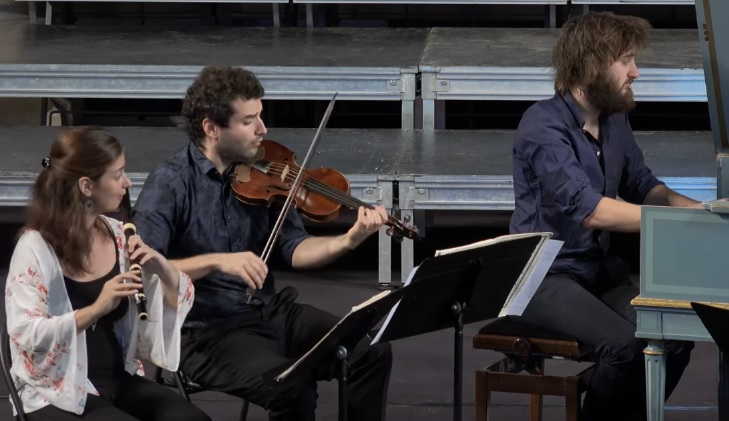
Jean Rondeau (far right) performing at the Festival de Saintes 2016.

Rondeau won Young Soloist 2014 in the Prix des Radios Francophones Publiques. His debut solo album, Imagine, was released by Warner Music on the Erato label in 2015 and, in June of that year, Rondeau performed at the Embassy of France in Washington, D.C., in an engagement declared by press to be "the most auspicious Washington debut of the season". In 2016 his second solo album, Vertigo: Rameau, Royer, was released.

In addition to his solo work, Rondeau also performs with the Baroque quartet Nevermind and is the founding member of Note Forget, a jazz ensemble in which he performs on piano.

=== Critical reception ===
A short excerpt of Rondeau performing Rameau's Les Sauvages from his 2016 album.

The Washington Post has described Rondeau as "a master of his instrument with the sort of communicative gifts normally encountered in musicians twice his age" and his playing as "masculine, direct and richly human". According to the Australian classical music magazine Limelight, Rondeau's playing "seems locked in a struggle between lyricism and contemplation, passion and detachment. Which is part of its magic."

=== Discography ===
- Imagine (2015)
- Vertigo: Rameau, Royer (2016)
- Bach Dynasty (2017)
- Paula (Music from the film) (2017)
- Scarlatti, Sonatas (2018)
- Barricades (2020)
- Melancholy Grace (2021)
- Bach: Goldberg Variations (2022)
- Gradus ad Parnassum (2023)
- Louis Couperin: The Complete Works (2025)
