= Belgian National Orchestra =

Belgian National Orchestra (BNO)
- Orchestra
- Founded: 1936
- Location: Brussels, Belgium
- Principal conductor: Antony Hermus
- Website: www.nationalorchestra.be

The Belgian National Orchestra (Dutch: Nationaal Orkest van België, French: Orchestre National de Belgique) is a Belgian orchestra, based in Brussels. Its principal concert venue is the Brussels Centre for Fine Arts (BOZAR). The orchestra also gives concerts outside Brussels in such cities as Sankt-Vith and Hasselt.

== History ==
The orchestra was founded in 1931 by Désiré Defauw as the Brussels Symphony Orchestra, and later reorganized in 1936 into its present form. With its base in the Centre for Fine Arts, Brussels and subsidized by the Belgian government, the BNO performs 70 concerts each season in Belgium and abroad, employing 96 musicians. It specializes in the music of the 19th and 20th centuries and film scores. In 2003, contestants in the final round of the Queen Elisabeth Music Competition were accompanied by the orchestra, under the direction of Gilbert Varga.

Before the 1958 appointment of André Cluytens as its music director and permanent conductor, the NOB worked with various conductors including Désiré Defauw, Karl Böhm, Erich Kleiber, and Pierre Monteux. In February 2016, the NOB announced the appointment of Hugh Wolff as its next chief conductor, effective with the 2017–2018 season. Wolff is scheduled to stand down as chief conductor at the close of the 2021–2022 season, and subsequently to take the title of dirigent emeritus (conductor emeritus) for two seasons.

In June 2019, Antony Hermus first guest-conducted the orchestra. Hermus returned for an additional guest-conducting appearance in October 2020. In July 2021, the orchestra announced the appointment of Hermus as its next chief conductor, effective with the 2022–2023 season, with an initial contract of four seasons. In September 2021, the orchestra announced the appointments of Michael Schønwandt as its new associate conductor, and of Roberto González-Monjas as its new principal guest conductor. Hermus concluded his tenure with the Belgian National Orchestra at the close of the 2025–2026 season and now has the title of conductor laureate with the orchestra.

In May 2024, Bob Permentier became Intendant (general manager) of the orchestra.

== Music directors and principal conductors ==
- André Cluytens (1958–1967)
- Michael Gielen (1969–1971)
- André Vandernoot (1974–1985)
- Georges Octors (1985–1989)
- Mendi Rodan (1983–1989)
- Ronald Zollman (1989–1993)
- Yuri Simonov (1994–2002)
- Mikko Franck (2002–2007)
- Walter Weller (2007–2012)
- Andrey Boreyko (2012–2017)
- Hugh Wolff (2017–2022)
- Antony Hermus (2022–2026)
