= Wye Jamison Allanbrook =

American musicologist (1943–2010)

- Born: March 15, 1943; Hagerstown, Maryland, U.S.
- Died: July 15, 2010 (aged 67); Oakland, California, U.S.
- Other name: Wendy Allanbrook
- Occupation: Musicologist
- Known for: Writings on the influence of social dance on Mozart's music
- Title: Professor Emerita
- Spouse: Douglas Allanbrook (divorced)
- Awards: Guggenheim Fellowship (1996)

Academic background
- Education: Vassar College (AB), Stanford University (PhD)
- Thesis: Rhythmic Gesture in Mozart: 'Le Nozze di Figaro' and 'Don Giovanni' (1974)

Academic work
- Discipline: Musicology
- Sub-discipline: 18th-century music, Mozart
- Institutions: St. John's College (Maryland), University of California, Berkeley
- Main interests: Mozart, opera, social dance, rhythmic gesture
- Notable works: Rhythmic Gesture in Mozart (1983), The Secular Commedia (2014)
- Notable ideas: Mozart's music influenced by social dances of the time; dance forms as indicators of character status in opera

Wye Jamison "Wendy" Allanbrook (March 15, 1943 – July 15, 2010) was an American musicologist whose writings demonstrated that much of the music of Mozart and his contemporaries was influenced by the social dances of the time.

Allanbrook was born on March 15, 1943, in Hagerstown, Maryland. She attended Vassar College where she earned her undergraduate degree in classics. She earned a Ph.D. from Stanford University in 1974, where her doctoral dissertation became the basis for her 1983 book Rhythmic Gesture in Mozart: 'Le Nozze di Figaro' and 'Don Giovanni' published by the University of Chicago Press, in which she demonstrated that Mozart's music integrated references to the social practices and dances of his period. Forms of music used by Mozart would demonstrate information about characters in his operas. For example, a minuet would be characteristic of upper class status, while a gigue was representative of peasants. Her research influenced the way in which directors and conductors, including Roger Norrington and Peter Sellars, have staged Mozart's operas. In a review of works about Mozart on the occasion of the 200th anniversary of the composer's death, music critic Edward Rothstein of The New York Times called Allanbrook's theories on the dances in The Marriage of Figaro and Don Giovanni to be among "the most intriguing insights into the music itself" that he had found.

She served on the faculty of St. John's College in Maryland from 1969 to 1995, when she moved to the University of California, Berkeley, where she served as Music Department chair from 1997 to 2003. She was recognized as a Guggenheim Fellow in 1996. Cancer forced her to resign in 2003 as president of the American Musicological Society. Her book The Secular Commedia: Comic Mimesis in Late Eighteenth-Century Music was completed by her colleagues Mary Ann Smart and Richard Taruskin based on the content of her "Bloch lectures," delivered in fall 1994 at UC Berkeley, and was published in 2014 by the University of California Press.

Allanbrook died of cancer at age 67 on July 15, 2010, at her home in Oakland, California. Her marriage to Douglas Allanbrook, a musician and composer who was a longtime professor at St. John's College, ended in divorce.
