= Montaigne (record label) =

Defunct French classical record company

Disques Montaigne (French pronunciation: [disk mɔ̃tɛɲ]) was a French classical record company founded in 1987 by Pierre Lebaillif, an official in charge of cultural sponsorship at the state owned bank Caisse des Dépôts et Consignations, and also vice-président of the Théâtre des Champs-Elysées. Lebaillif's intention was to make available to a wider public some valuable archive and live recordings. Lebaillif, had the original radio tapes from the 1950s and 60s cleaned up and digitally remastered by a renowned French recording engineer Pierre Verany, but rather than release them on Verany's own label (which specialised in early music), he created a new label for the Théâtre des Champs-Elysées. Although specialized the label's releases were well received. Among the rarities recovered by Labaillif was Manuel Rosenthal's performance of Darius Milhaud's rare opera Christophe Colomb and D. E. Inghelbrecht's performance of Pelleas et Melisande sung by Jacques Jansen and Micheline Grancher. Lebaillif died three years after founding the label, but the label continued to be active during the 1990s releasing mainly contemporary classical music such as the Arditti Quartet's recordings of György Kurtág, but also occasional older music such as Malgoire's recording of Lully's opera Alceste. The catalogue of Montaigne was later acquired by Louis Bricard's independent label Auvidis, which then itself was acquired by Naive Records.
