= Naïve Records =

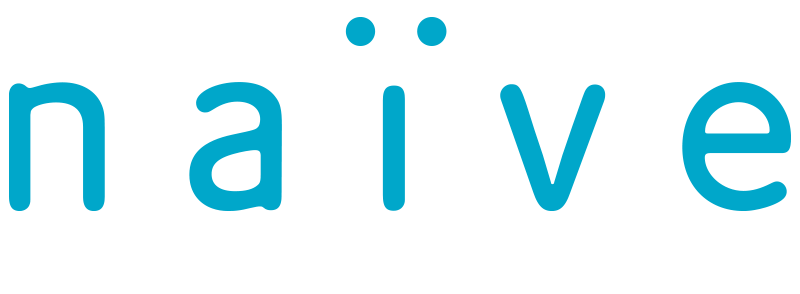
- Founded: 1997
- Founder: Patrick Zelnik; Gilles Paires; Éric Tong Cuong
- Genre: Pop, jazz, classical, chanson
- Country of origin: France
- Location: Paris
- Official website: www.naiverecords.com

Naïve Records (French: [naiv]) is a French independent record label based in Paris, specializing in electronic music, pop music, jazz and classical music.

== Founding and expansion ==
It was founded in 1998 by Patrick Zelnik, former CEO of Virgin France, Gilles Paires and Eric Tong Cuong.

Following finance house Édouard Stern taking a 10% stake in Naïve, Naïve acquired various other record labels, including among classical labels Auvidis (which included early music label Michel Bernstein's Astrée and modernist label Montaigne), Yolanta Skura's Opus 111 (founded 1990, named after Beethoven's Piano Sonata, Op. 111) and Nicolas Bartholomée's Ambroisie.

== Acquisition by Believe ==
The label got into difficulties after 2010 and, after having operations suspended, was acquired by Denis Ladegaillerie's digital download platform Believe Digital in August 2016. After a long hiatus the label began issuing CDs again with new releases in the Naive Vivaldi Edition.

== Artists ==
- Aṣa
- Asian Dub Foundation
- Benjamin Biolay
- Perry Blake
- Carla Bruni-Sarkozy
- Yilian Cañizares
- John & Jehn
- Jude
- Julien Lourau
- Souad Massi
- M83
- Mirwais
- Moriarty
- Meshell Ndegeocello
- Nervous Cabaret
- Pink Martini
- Serafin
- Tanita Tikaram

=== Classical and jazz ===
- Avishai Cohen
- Tigran Hamasyan
- Alison Chesley
- Franco Fagioli
- Sergey Khachatryan
- Garth Knox
- Marie-Nicole Lemieux
- Nikolai Lugansky
- Anne Sofie von Otter
- Johann Sebastian Bach
- Lise de la Salle
- Federico Maria Sardelli, Vivaldi Edition
- Fazıl Say
- Hopkinson Smith
- Anthony Strong
