= Beatrice Cenci (opera) =

1949 opera by Berthold Goldschmidt

Beatrice Cenci is an opera in three acts by German composer Berthold Goldschmidt based on the Shelley play The Cenci. Composed in 1949 to an English libretto by Martin Esslin. Goldschmidt’s second opera was one of four prize-winning works in the British Arts Council’s ‘Festival of Britain’ competition in 1949, but it never received the promised performance in the 1951 Festival. Its concert premiere was in Queen Elizabeth Hall, London in 1988, and its staged premiere in Magdeburg in 1994.

== Roles ==
Roles, voice types, premiere cast
Role	Voice type
Francesco Cenci, the count	baritone
Lucrezia, his second wife	alto
Beatrice, his daughter from first marriage	soprano
Bernardo, his son from first marriage	mezzo-soprano
Cardinal Camillo	bass
Orsino, a Prelate	tenor
Marzio, a hired assassin	baritone
Olimpio, second assassin	bass
Judge	tenor

== Synopsis ==
Time and Place: In and near Rome, 1599.

Act I

In Count Cenci's palace, his daughter Beatrice, together with her stepmother Lucrezia and brother Bernardo, dreams of life away from Cenci’s brutality (My gentle Beatrice). Meanwhile, Cardinal Camillo delivers a message from Pope Clement VIII to Count Cenci: the "murder" is hushed up if Cenci is prepared to yield a fief to the church (His Holiness the Pope bids me). The prelate Orsino, a family friend who has been in love with Beatrice, asks to see Beatrice, who implores him to help her seek a marriage through petitioning the Pope (Orsino, two long years are past). He pretends to agree, but secretly has plans to win her himself (Farewell. He shall not read your eloquent petition). Count Cenci holds a party (Princes and Cardinals, my friends and kinsmen). His guests are horrified when he tells stories about and drinks a toast to the murder of his two sons in Salamanca, apparently orchestrated by himself (It is indeed a most desired event). Beatrice appeals to the guests to rescue her and the remaining family, but she is abandoned to face her father’s incestuous rape as a revenge (Friends, leave us not alone!).

Act II

Beatrice enters and encounters Lucrezia who wonders at her state (Beatrice! Speak!). Beatrice and Lucrezia meet with Orsino and express their anguish (Orsino!). Orsino proposes hiring two assassins to murder Cenci in his sleep. Cenci enters and ignores Lucrezia's warnings of fate (Beatrice...). Cenci tells her that Beatrice will continue to suffer. Before Cenci's bedtime, Lucrezia administers the sleeping draught to his wine (He does his will - I mine!). Lucrezia agonizes (He is asleep...) but finally two hired assassins, Marzio and Olimpio, enter, strangle Cenci and throw his body from a window (They come not yet?). Camillo and the authorities arrive immediately after the murder is committed (Who knocks). One assassin is caught with a letter from Orsino revealing the complicity of Beatrice and Lucrezia who, despite protestations, are arrested (My lord, we found this ruffian lurking in the garden).

Act III

Beatrice and Lucrezia are in prison and are tried in the court set up by the Pop. (Lucrezia Cenci! Beatrice Cenci!) Beatrice hopes for help and witness testimony from Orsino, but he has fled. Lucrezia confesses under torture (How very friendless you would be dear child), and the Judge pronounces the ladies guilty and sentences them to death, though Cardinal Camillo agrees to seek clemency from the Pope. The following morning he returns with news that the Pope is stern and their execution is imminent (The Pope is stern). Beatrice mourns her fate (False friend, willst thou smile or weep). At the foot of the scaffold Bernardo tells Beatrice and Lucrezia that his own plea to the Pope has also failed. The women are executed and a Requiem Mass for their souls is heard. Cardinal Camillo murmurs "They have fulfilled their fate. Guilty and yet not guilty".

== Productions ==
- 1988 world premiere concert performance in Queen Elizabeth Hall, London, 14 April 1988.
- 1994 world stage premiere at Theater Magdeburg, Max K. Hoffmann (stage director), Mathias Husmann (conductor), 10 September 1994.
- 1994 production with Roberta Alexander at Opernfest Berlin
- 1998 first staged production of Beatrice Cenci Trinity College of Music July 9–11, 1998.

== Recordings ==
- sung in English - Beatrice Cenci. Roberta Alexander (soprano), Simon Estes (bass), Stefan Stoll, Della Jones (mezzo), Endrik Wottrich (tenor), Siegfried Lorenz (baritone), John David De Haan (tenor), Reinhard Beyer (bass), Ian Bostridge (tenor), conductor: Deutsches Symphonie-Orchester Berlin, Berlin Radio Chorus, Lothar Zagrosek 2CD Sony
- sung in German - Beatrice Cenci. Gal James, Christoph Pohl, Dshamilja Kaiser, Prague Philharmonic Choir, Wiener Symphoniker, conducted Johannes Debus. Bregenzer Festspiele, stage director Johannes Erath, July 18, 2018, DVD and Blu-Ray.
