= Auvidis =

French record label

Auvidis was a record label founded in 1976 by Louis Bricard. Along with its subsidiaries, it was acquired in 1998 by Naïve Records.

During its existence, Auvidis acquired a number of subsidiary labels, such as Unidisc; the traditional and world music label Silex, founded by André Ricros and Philippe Krumm in 1990; and the classical labels Valois, then Astrée, both founded by Michel Bernstein, as well as the label Disques Montaigne. Auvidis also created its own sub-imprints, such as Travelling, created in 1993 to develop soundtracks, and Fontalis, created in 1997 to market the work of Jordi Savall (who later left to start his own label, Alia Vox).
