= Rudolf Jansen =

Dutch pianist (1940–2024)

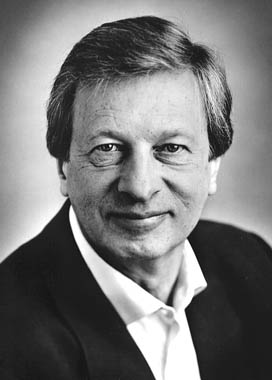
- Born: 19 January 1940; Arnhem, Netherlands
- Died: 12 February 2024 (aged 84); Laren, Netherlands
- Education: Sweelinck Conservatory
- Occupations: Classical pianist; Academic teacher
- Organizations: Sweelinck Conservatory; Musikhochschule Nürnberg
- Awards: Edison Award

Rudolf Jansen (19 January 1940 – 12 February 2024) was a Dutch pianist who focused on Lied accompaniment and chamber music, touring the world. He accompanied singers including Elly Ameling, Barbara Bonney, Peter Schreier and Dietrich Fischer-Dieskau. Jansen taught at the Sweelinck Conservatory of Amsterdam and the Musikhochschule Nürnberg, and gave masterclasses worldwide.

== Life and career ==
Rudolf Jansen was born in Arnhem on 19 January 1940. He received early organ lessons from his father, Simon C. Jansen. He studied at the Sweelinck Conservatory of Amsterdam, organ with his father, piano with Nelly Wagenaar and Felix de Nobel, and harpsichord with Gustav Leonhardt; he earned there a Prix d'Excellence for organ in 1964, and one for piano in 1966.

In 1965, he was awarded the Toonkunst Jubileumprijs, and in 1966, the "Zilveren Vriendenkrans" by the Friends of the Concertgebouw. He won the Edison Award twice: in 1973 with oboist Han de Vries and in 1987 with soprano Dorothy Dorow.

His focus became, in addition to solo performance, Lied accompaniment and chamber music. He toured the world in recitals, and collaborated with singers such as Elly Ameling, Irina Arkhipova, Olaf Bär, Hans Peter Blochwitz, Barbara Bonney, Brigitte Fassbaender, Birgit Finnilä, Monica Groop, Tom Krause, Christiane Oelze, Andreas Schmidt, Edith Wiens, Peter Schreier and Christianne Stotijn, and instrumentalists including Abbie de Quant and Jean-Pierre Rampal. He was the regular accompanist of Dietrich Fischer-Dieskau for several years. He played his last concert at the Concertgebouw in Amsterdam in 2017; it was dedicated to him.

Jansen taught at the Sweelinck Conservatory, where he established a class for Lied, and at the Musikhochschule Nürnberg; he regularly gave masterclasses for singer/piano duos in the Netherlands and abroad.

=== Personal life ===
Jansen was married to Christa Pfeiler, a singer with whom he performed in concerts and recordings.

Jansen died in Laren on 12 February 2024, at the age of 84.

A prize of the International Vocal Competition 's-Hertogenbosch is named after him.

== Recordings ==
Jansen made more than 120 CDs, mostly of Lied recitals. He recorded the complete songs of Alphons Diepenbrock with his wife Christa Pfeiler and Robert Holl, with whom he also recorded Johannes Brahms' songs, the complete the songs of Edvard Grieg with four soloists, and the complete songs of Anton Webern with Dorothy Dorow. A reviewer from Gramophone noted that the musicians had "an assured grasp of Webern's style". A recording with Dietrich Fischer-Dieskau was awarded a Deutscher Schallplattenpreis in 1992. When he made a recording of Wolf's Italienisches Liederbuch with soprano Christiane Oelze, Alan Blyth wrote:

Rudolf Jansen deserves a notice to himself for his unravelling of all the intricacies of the often independent piano parts and for his outright mastery in giving the keyboard its due without ever stealing the thunder of the singers; his instrument is ideally balanced with the voices in a truthful recording.
