= Danish Quartet =

The Danish Quartet is a name which has been carried by four Danish quartets:

== Den Danske Kvartet ==
1935 the Danish Quartet (Danish: Den Danske Kvartet) was a quartet for flute, violin, cello and piano which was active 1935-1957. Members included:

- Holger Gilbert-Jespersen (1890–1975), flute.
- Erling Bloch (1904–1992), violin.
- Torben Anton Svendsen (1904–1980), cello.
- Holger Lund Christiansen, piano. (also accompanist to Aksel Schiøtz)

The Quartet released several 78s, including Handel's Trio Sonata No.7, in C minor.

Erling Bloch had earlier founded, in 1933, the Erling Bloch Quartet, a traditional string quartet comprising Erling Bloch and Lavard Friisholm, violins, Hans Kassow, viola, Torben Anton Svendsen (again), cello. Among other recordings the Erling Bloch Quartet recorded the Nielsen String Quartet No.3 in 1946.

== Le Quatuor Danois ==
1949-1983 Den Nye Danske Kvartet, known in English media as The Danish Quartet, and in their releases on the Valois label of Michel Bernstein as the Quatuor Danois. The ensemble was the first Danish state ensemble with educational duties 1967-1978, and was under the patronage of King Frederik IX of Denmark. Members included:

- first violin: Arne Svendsen (1929–2010) 1949-1983.
- second violin: Reidar Knudsen 1949-1954, Hans Nielsen 1954-1959, Palle Heichelmann 1959-1977, Wladimir Marschwinski 1977-1983.
- Knud Frederiksen, viola.
- Jørgen Jensen 1949-1959, Pierre Renè Honnens 1959-1977, Gert von Bülow 1977-1979 and Niels Ullner 1979-1983.

== The Danish Quartet ==
Active from 1985-1996 as Den Danske Strygekvartet. The quartet recorded the Carl Nielsen string quartets for Kontrapunkt 1992

- Tim Frederiksen, violin, leader.
- Arne Balk-Møller (b. 1965), violin.
- Claus Myrup, viola
- Nils Sylvest Jeppesen 1985-1988, Henrik Brendstrup 1988-, cello.

Recordings include:

- Carl Nielsen String Quartets, Kontrapunkt.
- Sofia Gubaidulina String Quartets Nos. 1-3, Trio. CPO.
- Paul Hindemith Complete String Quartets. CPO.

== Danish String Quartet ==
This Danish String Quartet made its debut at the Copenhagen Summer Festival in 2002. In 2012, The New York Times selected the quartet’s concert as a highlight of the year, saying the performance featured “one of the most powerful renditions of Beethoven’s Opus 132 String Quartet that I’ve heard live or on a recording.” In 2013, they began a three-year appointment in Chamber Music Society of Lincoln Center’s CMS Two Program. The quartet was named as a BBC Radio 3 New Generation Artist for 2013-15.

Since 2007, the group has curated its own annual festival —DSQ Festival— in Nyboder, Copenhagen. 2016 marked the beginning of Series of Four, the quartet's new concert series in the concert hall of The Royal Danish Academy of Music, Copenhagen.

Violinists Frederik Øland and Rune Tonsgaard Sørensen and violist Asbjørn Nørgaard met as children at a music summer camp where they played both football and music together, eventually making the transition into a serious string quartet in their teens and studying at Copenhagen’s Royal Academy of Music. In 2008, the three Danes were joined by Norwegian cellist Fredrik Schøyen Sjölin. The Danish String Quartet was primarily taught and mentored by Professor Tim Frederiksen and have participated in master classes with the Tokyo and Emerson String Quartets, Alasdair Tait, Paul Katz, Hugh Maguire, Levon Chilingirian and Gábor Takács-Nagy.

Current Members:

- Rune Tonsgaard Sørensen (b. 1983), violin
- Frederik Øland (b. 1984), violin
- Asbjørn Nørgaard (b. 1984), viola
- Fredrik Schøyen Sjölin (b. 1982), cello

Discography:

- Prism III (ECM 2021)
- Prism II (ECM 2019)
- Prism I (ECM 2018)
- Last Leaf (ECM 2017)
- Adès, Nørgård & Abrahamsen (ECM 2016)
- Brahms, Fuchs: Clarinet Quintets with clarinetist Sebastian Manz (CAvi-music 2014)
- Wood Works (Dacapo 2014)
- Haydn, Brahms (CAvi-music 2012)
- Nielsen: String Quartets, Vol. 2 (Dacapo 2008)
- Nielsen: String Quartets, Vol. 1 (Dacapo 2007)

Awards:

- Danish Radio P2 Chamber Music Competition, First Prize and Audienze Prize (2004)
- Trondheim International String Quartet Competition, shared First Prize and Audience Prize (2005)
- Charles Hennen International Chamber Music Competition, First Prize (2005)
- Vagn Holmboe String Quartet Competition, First Prize (2005)
- London International String Quartet Competition, First Prize, Beethoven Prize, Sidney Griller Award, 20th century Prize, Menton Festival Prize (2009)
- Mecklenburg-Vorpommern Festival, NORDMETALL-Ensemble Prize (2010)
- Carl Nielsen Prize (2011)
- Wilhelm Hansen Prize (2015)
- Borletti-Buitoni Trust Award (2016)
