= Dorothy Dorow =

British classical soprano (1930–2017)

Dorothy Margaret Dorow (also Dorow-Bell, 22 August 1930 – 15 April 2017) was an English soprano, mostly active in the contemporary vocal music field. Dorow sang the world premieres of works by a number of 20th-century composers, and was particularly noted for her vocal style and range. She won the Edison Award in 1987 with Rudolf Jansen (piano).

== Life ==
Dorow was born in London on 22 August 1930. She attended Trinity College of Music, where she studied piano and composition, and studied singing with operatic soprano Maggie Teyte. She sang with Deller Consort, the Ambrosian Singers, and Schola Polyphonica before her debut solo, which was in London in 1958, with the New Music Ensemble. Dorow specialised in 20th-century music, and was known for her vocal range of almost four octaves, and her ability to read the most complex scores. She sang world-premieres of works by such composers as György Ligeti, Hans Werner Henze, Luigi Dallapiccola, Sylvano Bussotti and Luigi Nono. Dorow was also particularly noted for her performances of the vocal works of the Second Viennese School, and of Igor Stravinsky. Dorow moved to Stockholm in 1963, and then in 1977 was appointed as a professor at the Maastricht University, and also gave masterclasses at the Sweelinck conservatorium. She performed internationally including at the Kraków Philharmonic and in America.

Dorow won the Edison Award in 1987 with Rudolf Jansen (piano). After several years of living abroad, she retired in 1992 to Duloe, Cornwall, where she died on 15 April 2017.

== Recordings (sel.) ==
- 1972 Fartein Valen: Symphonic Poems & Orchestral Songs, Simax
- 1975 Dorothy Dorow & Friends: Bell, Musgrave, Maros, Werle, Nørgård, Bäck, Caprice Records (CAP 1059)
- 1977 Dorothy Dorow & More Friends: Dallapiccola, Tavener, Bedford, Lidholm, Denisov, Naumann, Caprice Records (CAP 1112)
- 1987 Anton Webern: Lieder, Dorothy Dorow (soprano) and Rudolf Jansen (piano), Etcetera Records
- 1988 Franco Donatoni: Spiri; Fili; De Près; etc., EtCetera Records
- 1988 Arnold Schoenberg: Cabaret Songs; Berg: Lieder; Webern: Seven Early Songs, EtCetera Records
- 1989 Anton Webern: Complete Vocal Chamber Works, Koch Schwann
- 1989 Contemporary Music for Soprano and Cello, Dorothy Dorow (soprano) and Aage Kvalbein (cello), Simax
- 1995 Dorothy Dorow, Gunilla von Bahr, Lucia Negro, (a coloratura recording), BIS Records
