= Antony Hermus =

Dutch conductor (born 1973)

- Born: 1973 (age 52–53); Oosterhout, Netherlands
- Occupation: Conductor
- Website: antonyhermus.com

Antony Hermus (born 1973, Oosterhout, The Netherlands) is a Dutch conductor.

== Biography ==
Hermus started playing piano at age 6. His piano teachers as a youth included Pieter van Moergastel and Ben Martin Weyand. He later studied with Jacques de Tiège at the Tilburg Music Conservatory. He graduated from the Katholieke Universiteit Brabant with a degree in information science, alongside musical training. He then studied conducting with Jac van Steen and Georg Fritzsch.

In 1998, Hermus joined the staff of the Hagen Theatre, where he subsequently served as a repetiteur. After attaining the post of Erster Kapellmeister with the company, he became Generalmusikdirektor (GMD) of the company in 2002, and held the post until 2008. In 2009, he became GMD of the Dessau Opera, and was nominated for Conductor of the Year by Opernwelt in 2010, 2011, and 2012. He completed his tenure in Dessau in 2015 by conducting his first Ring cycle, and being named honorary conductor.

Hermus has served as principal guest conductor of the North Netherlands Orchestra and artistic advisor of the National Youth Orchestra of the Netherlands. In June 2019, he first guest-conducted the Belgian National Orchestra. Hermus returned for an additional guest-conducting appearance in October 2020. In July 2021, the Belgian National Orchestra announced the appointment of Hermus as its next chief conductor, effective with the 2022–2023 season, with an initial contract of four seasons. Hermus concluded his tenure with the Belgian National Orchestra at the close of the 2025–2026 season and now has the title of conductor laureate with the orchestra.

In 2018, Hermus first guest-conducted the BBC Scottish Symphony Orchestra (BBC SSO). In June 2026, the BBC SSO announced the appointment of Hermus as its next chief conductor, effective in September 2027.

Hermus has made a number of recordings for the CPO record label, including symphonies by Hausegger, Diepenbrock, Klughardt, and Wagenaar, as well as a recording of Auber's opera La Muette de Portici.

Cultural offices
Preceded by Georg Fritzsch	Generalmusikdirektor, Theater Hagen; 2002–2008	Succeeded by Florian Ludwig
Preceded by Golo Berg	Generalmusikdirektor, Anhaltisches Theater Dessau; 2009–2015	Succeeded by Markus Frank
