= Eline Vere (film) =

1991 film

- Theatrical release poster
- Directed by: Harry Kümel
- Screenplay by: Jan Blokker
- Based on: Eline Vere by Louis Couperus
- Produced by: Matthijs van Heijningen
- Starring: Marianne Basler
- Cinematography: Eduard van Der Enden
- Edited by: Ludo Troch
- Music by: Laurens van Rooyen
- Production company: Sigma Film Productions
- Distributed by: Cannon Tuschinski Film Distributors
- Release date: 1 March 1991
- Running time: 132 minutes
- Countries: Netherlands; Belgium
- Language: Dutch

Eline Vere is a 1991 Dutch-Belgian film directed by Harry Kümel, based on the 1889 novel with the same title by Louis Couperus. The film was selected as the Dutch entry for the Best Foreign Language Film at the 64th Academy Awards, but was not accepted as a nominee.

== Cast ==
- Marianne Basler ... Eline Vere
- Monique van de Ven ... Betsy van Raat
- Johan Leysen ... Henk van Raat
- Thom Hoffman ... Vincent Vere
- Paul Anrieu ... Oom Daniél
- Aurore Clément ... Tante Elise
- Bernard Kruysen ... Theo Fabrice
- Michael York ... Lawrence St. Clare
- Mary Dresselhuys ... Mevrouw van Raat
- Koen De Bouw ... Paul van Raat
- Miryanna van Reeden ... Jeanne Ferelijn (as Miryanna Boom)
- Herman Gilis... Otto van Erlevoort
- Karen van Parijs ... Frederique van Erlevoort
- Alexandra van Marken ... Emile de Weerde van Bergh
- Michael Pas ... George de Weerde van Bergh
- Ragnhild Rikkelman ... Lille Verstraeten

== See also ==
- List of submissions to the 64th Academy Awards for Best Foreign Language Film
- List of Dutch submissions for the Academy Award for Best Foreign Language Film
