= Esther Lamandier =

French soprano and harpist (born 1946)

Esther Lamandier is a French soprano and harpist known for explorations in early chant and monodic music. She is known to frequently accompany herself on the harp, vielle or portative organ (for example, in her CD 'Cantigas de Santa Maria').

Lamandier was born in 1946 in Saint-Raphaël, Provence-Alpes-Côte d'Azur, France; her father's family is Jewish, from Piatra Neamț in Romania. She is a specialist in both Assyrian and Sephardic Jewish song, and the Hebrew biblical chant transcriptions of Suzanne Haïk-Vantoura.

== Discography ==
- Decameron - Ballate monodiques de l'Ars Nova Florentine Astrée (LP, 1980); producer Michel Bernstein
- Alfonso El Sabio Cantigas De Santa Maria Astrée (record label) (LP, 1981)
- Romances - Chansons et Complaintes Séfarades Aliénor AL10 (LP, 1982) Romances Séfarades (2002)
- Chansons de toile au temps du Roman de la rose (LP, 1983) AL11
- Romances II - Berceuses Et Complaintes Séfarades Et Chants Araméens (LP, 1984)
- Compilation: Romances - Romances séfarades et Chants Araméens (CD, Compilation 1985) AL 1012
- Domna (CD, 1987) AL1019
- Chansons Andalouses Et Tangos (LP 1983, CD 1988) AL 1025
- Chants Chrétiens Araméens - Aramean Christian chant (1989, CD 1999)
- Music of the Bible Revealed (1993)
- Psaumes de David (1999)
- Le Livre D'Isaie - Hebrew biblical chant (2006)
