= Noël Lee =

American classical composer

Noël Lee (December 25, 1924 – July 15, 2013) was an American classical pianist and composer.

== Biography ==
Born in 1924 in Nanjing, China, Lee studied music in Lafayette, Indiana, then attended Harvard University, studying with Walter Piston, Irving Fine, and Tillman Merritt and was also a student at the Longy School of Music in the early 1940s. Following World War II, he traveled to Paris, where he studied music with Nadia Boulanger and was a friend of Douglas Allanbrook. He composed orchestral, chamber, piano, vocal, and film music. In addition, he completed several unfinished piano works by Franz Schubert, and composed cadenzas for piano concertos by Wolfgang Amadeus Mozart and Ludwig van Beethoven. He was also well known for his piano accompaniment.

Lee was a visiting professor at Brandeis University, Cornell University, and Dartmouth College. He received numerous awards throughout his career, an award from the American Academy of Arts and Letters for his creative work in 1959, and from France, twice laureate of the Fondation de France, in 1998, the grade of Commandeur of the Ordre des Arts et des Lettres, and, in 1999, from the city of Paris, the Grand Prix de la Musique.

Lee's first recordings were for the Valois label of Michel Bernstein. He recorded, together with French pianist Christian Ivaldi, the complete works for four hands by Schubert for the label Arion. He was the pianist for the American violinist Paul Makanowitzki (1920–1998), the Dutch baritone Bernard Kruysen (1933–2000) and the French soprano Anne-Marie Rodde. As a pianist, he toured on six continents and recorded 198 LPs and CDs since 1955, particularly of Schubert (including the complete sonatas), Debussy, Ravel, Charles Ives, Bartók, Stravinsky, Aaron Copland and Elliott Carter. He was instrumental to the rediscovery of American composer Louis Moreau Gottschalk (1829–69), and his Gottshalk recording (CD Erato reissued on Warner Classics/Apex) was used in the soundtrack to the 1994 Michel Deville film Aux petits bonheurs. Thirteen of these recordings have received a Grand Prix du Disque.

== Sources ==
- Google Books: International Who's Who in Classical Music 2003, 457 (Search: Lee, Noel)
