= Mary Ann Smart =

American musicologist (born 1964)

Mary Ann Smart (29 March 1964 in Toronto) is a Canadian-born musicologist.

Smart earned a doctorate from Cornell University and is the Terrill Professor of Music at the University of California, Berkeley. She specializes in the study of nineteenth century opera.

== Selected publications ==
- Smart, Mary Ann (2018). Waiting for Verdi: Opera and Political Opinion in Nineteenth-Century Italy, 1815-1848. University of California Press. ISBN 9780520276253.
- Allanbrook, Wye Jamison (2014). Smart, Mary Ann; Taruskin, Richard (eds.). The Secular Commedia: Comic Mimesis in Late Eighteenth-Century Music. University of California Press. ISBN 9780520958876.
- Smart, Mary Ann (2004). Mimomania: Music and Gesture in Nineteenth-Century Opera. University of California Press. ISBN 9780520248311.
- Smart, Mary Ann (2000). Siren Songs: Representations of Gender and Sexuality in Opera. Princeton University Press. ISBN 9780691058139.
