= Miroslav Venhoda =

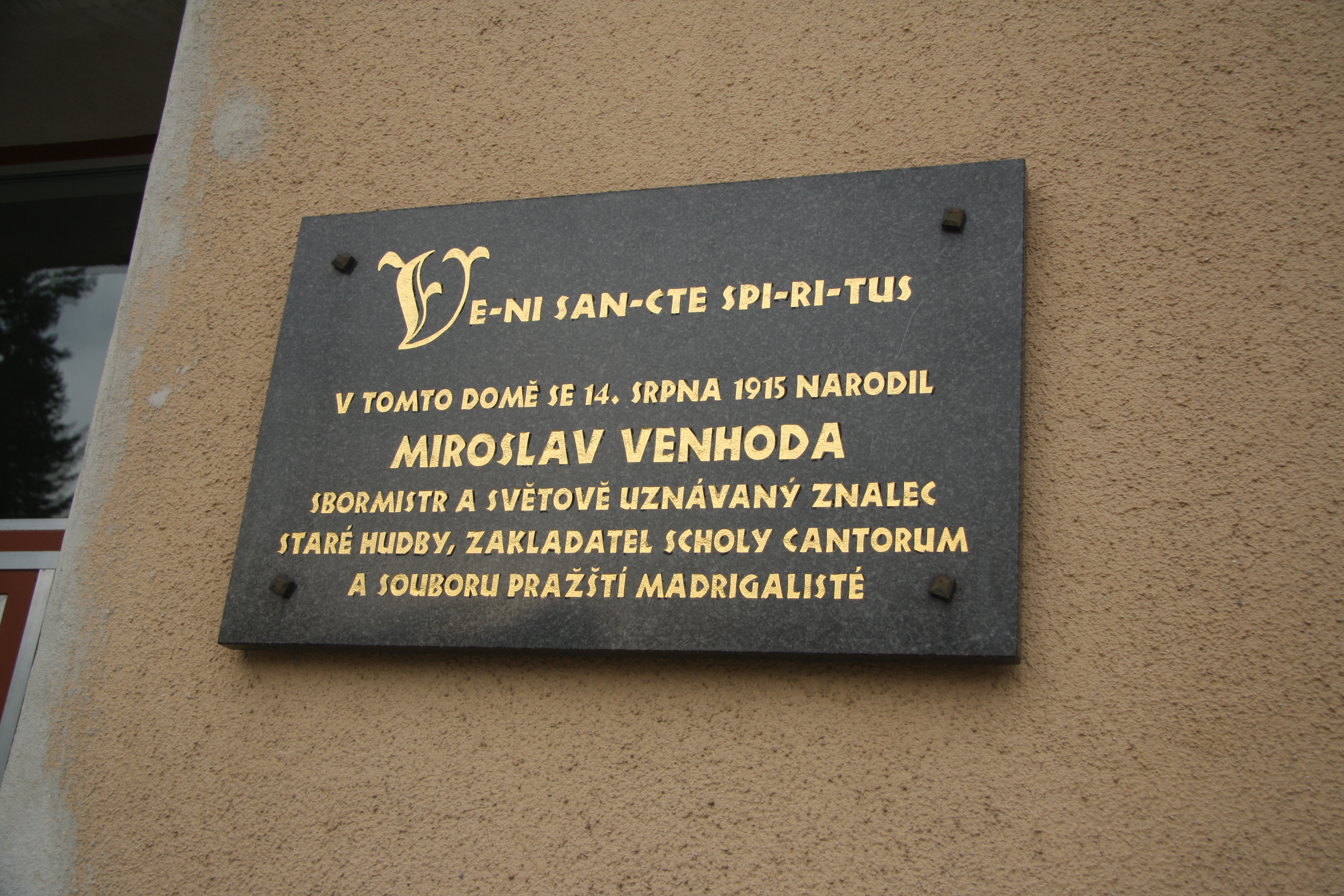
Plaque to Venhoda at his birthplace in Moravské Budějovice

Miroslav Venhoda (4 August 1915 in Moravské Budějovice – 10 May 1987 in Prague) was a Czech choral conductor who specialized in the performance of Renaissance and Baroque music, via his ensemble The Prague Madrigalists (Pražští madrigalisté in the original language), which he founded in 1956.

Trained during the 1930s at Prague's Charles University, Venhoda spent the war years as choral director and organist at the city's Strahov (Dominican) monastery; a book he published in 1946, called Method of Studying Gregorian Chant, drew on this experience. He first achieved an international reputation for his LP records with the Madrigalists, which began appearing in the early 1960s and continued till the mid-1970s. These discs, mostly for the Supraphon label, included a great many world premiere recordings of composers such as Dufay, Ockeghem, Obrecht, and Jacobus Gallus, as well as of more frequently performed masters such as Palestrina, Lassus, Monteverdi, Dowland, Tallis, and Orlando Gibbons. Sometimes they included Venhoda himself at the organ. He concentrated – a singular feat, given the Czech Communist regime's ideology – upon sacred works.

Venhoda's approach indicated his German artistic influences: choral singing which emphasized rich chest voice production; invariably Teutonic renderings of Latin (quoniam would become kvoniam, and Agnus would become Agg-nus, for example); tempi which inclined to the leisured and majestic; above all, profuse doubling of the vocal parts by instruments, such as became unfashionable with the advent of a cleaner, "whiter" sound from later, English or English-influenced, early-music groups like the Tallis Scholars. Nevertheless, Venhoda's legacy remains a valuable one, as can be discerned from the power and intensity of those all too few Venhoda performances which have been transferred to compact disc.

The Prague Madrigalists continue to this day, and are now led by Italian-born Damiano Binetti.
