= Blandine Verlet =

French harpsichordist and teacher (1942 - 2018)

Blandine Verlet (27 February 1942 – 30 December 2018) was a French harpsichordist and a harpsichord teacher, who is known internationally for her recordings of works by François Couperin.

== Career ==
Born in Paris into a musical family of art historians and conservators, she was the seventh of ten children, and in 1957, gained admission to the Conservatoire de Paris, studying piano and harpsichord. Having decided on her specialty, she studied harpsichord with Huguette Dreyfus in Paris, Ruggero Gerlin in Siena and with Ralph Kirkpatrick at Yale University. A significant competition prize in Paris in 1963 led to engagements in Italy and Germany.

Verlet was widely praised for her recordings of Bach's music, including the Goldberg Variations. She is perhaps best known for having played the music of her compatriot François Couperin, displaying exceptional sensitivity and imagination. Verlet recorded Couperin's complete works in the 1970s and '80s, and in late 2011 she returned to re-record five 'ordres' on the period Henri Hemsch harpsichord. Verlet wrote a poem in celebration of Couperin which accompanied the release, the closing lines of which exemplify her great imaginative empathy with this key French composer:

We hope we too have managed to grasp
your art of playing the harpsichord.
The art of both poetry and precision.
The art of whispering, murmuring.
The song without words, lighter for having no text.
Wandering shadows, expressions of the heart.
Our thanks to you, Francois Couperin. (tr. Mary Pardoe)

During the 1980s Verlet taught at the Conservatoire Claude Debussy in Paris, the Conservatoire Gabriel Fauré de GrandAngoulême, and the Conservatoire de Bordeaux.

Verlet died at the age of 76.

== Personal life ==
Blandine Verlet's father, Pierre Verlet, was the head of the decorative arts department of the Louvre from 1933 to 1972; her mother, Nicole Verlet-Réaubourg, was an art historian; and her sister, Colombe Samoyault-Verlet, was also a historian and conservator.

Her husband, Igor B. Maslowski, was the director of Philips France as well as a Russian translator and mystery writer.

== Discography ==
- 1973 Frescobaldi: Toccate d'intavolatura di cimbalo. Das Alte Werk, Telefunken-Decca
- 1975 Mozart: 16 Sonatas pour violon et clavecin with Gérard Poulet. Philips 6599 993
- 1975 Scarlatti: Sonates. Philips
- 1976 Scarlatti: 15 Sonates pour clavecin. Philips
- 1978 Duphly - Balbastre: Musiques pour les princesses de France. Philips
- 1979 Couperin: Pièces de Clavecin. Astrée
- 1981 Jean-Philippe Rameau : L’œuvre de Clavecin. Astrée
- 1989 Froberger: Pièces de clavecin. Astrée
- 1990 Louis Marchand: Pièces de clavecin (1702). Astrée
- 1994 Bach: Le clavier bien tempéré. Astrée
- 1995 Bach: Fantaisies, toccatas et Fugues. Astrée
- 1999 Jacquet de la Guerre: Œuvres pour clavecin. Astrée
- 1999 Bach: Inventions et Sinfonias. Astrée
- 1999 Bach: Variations Goldberg. Astrée
- 2000 Froberger: L'intranquilité. Astrée
- 2000 Louis Couperin: Les Pièces de clavessin. Astrée
- 2003 Couperin: Les Barricades mystérieuses / Pièces de clavecin. Astrée
- 2012 Francois Couperin, Pièces de clavecin des Livres II & IV. Aparté (recorded on a 1751 harpsichord by Henri Hemsch)
- 2018 François Couperin: Pièces de clavecin du Livre III. Aparté
