= Damiano Binetti =

Italian conductor

Damiano Binetti (born 1968) is an Italian conductor, composer and tenor based in Prague and Malta. He is the artistic director of the Prague Madrigalists, the chamber ensemble within the Czech Philharmonic, and also the artistic director for the Theatre of Silesia in Opava in the Czech Republic. Binetti was also the principal conductor and music director of the Prague Mozart Chamber Orchestra, a position held until 2006.
