= Moravské Budějovice =

- Town
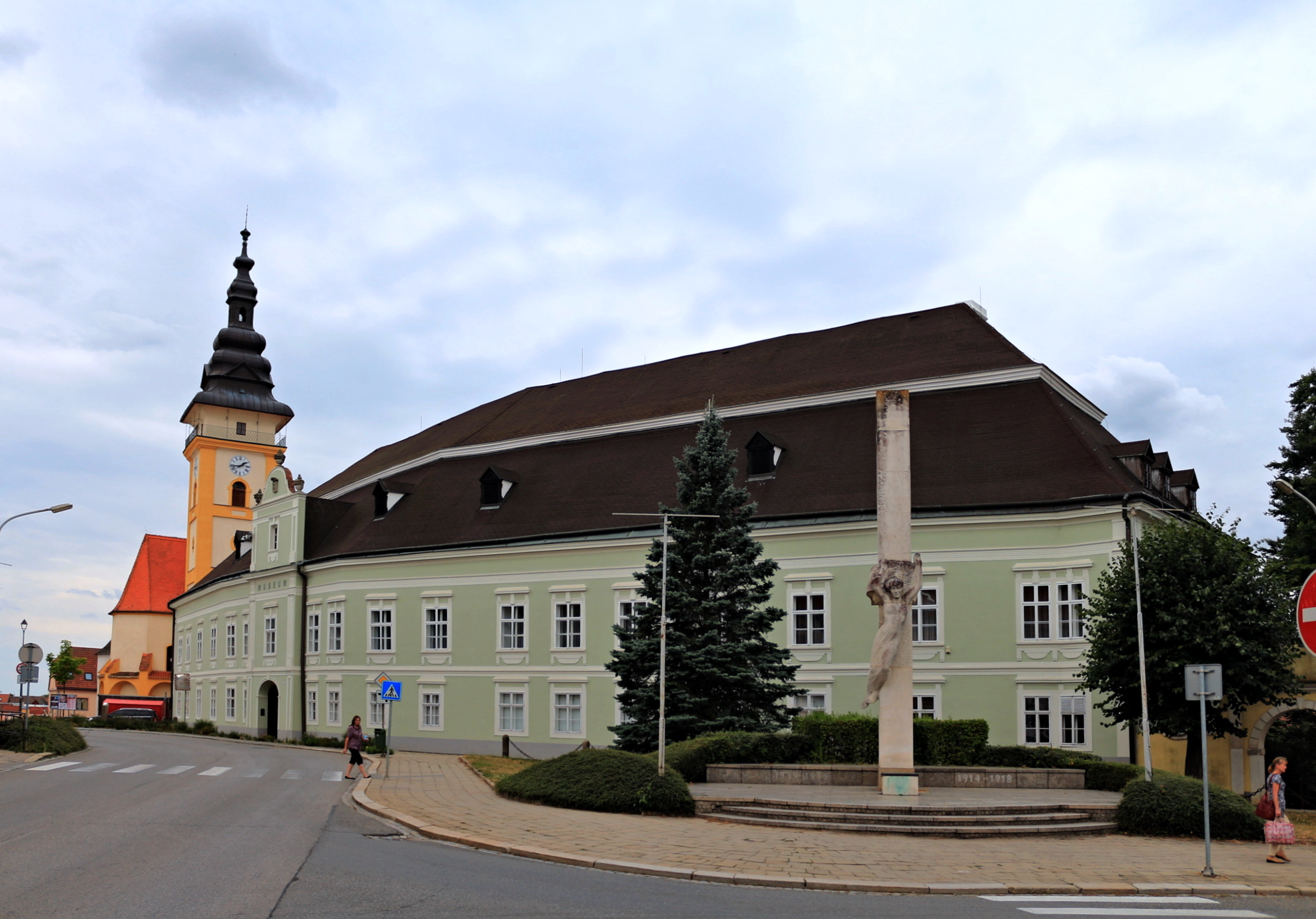
- Moravské Budějovice Castle

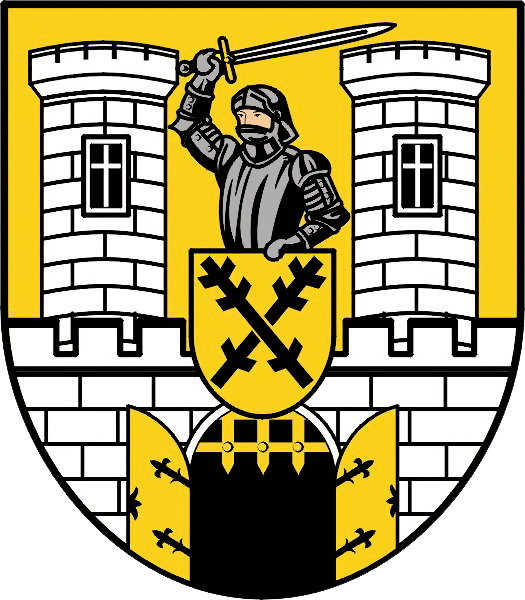
- Flag Coat of arms

- Location in the Czech Republic
- Coordinates: 49°3′8″N 15°48′31″E
- Country: Czech Republic
- Region: Vysočina
- District: Třebíč
- First mentioned: 1231

Government
  - Mayor: Martin Ferdan

Area
  - Total: 37.13 km^{2} (14.34 sq mi)
- Elevation: 465 m (1,526 ft)

Population (2026-01-01)
  - Total: 7,079
  - Density: 190.7/km^{2} (493.8/sq mi)
- Time zone: UTC+1 (CET)
  - Summer (DST): UTC+2 (CEST)
- Postal code: 676 02
- Website: www.mbudejovice.cz

Moravské Budějovice (Czech pronunciation: [ˈmorafskɛː ˈbuɟɛjovɪtsɛ]; German: Mährisch Budwitz) is a town in Třebíč District in the Vysočina Region of the Czech Republic. It has about 7,100 inhabitants. The town is located on the Rokytka Stream in the Jevišovice Uplands.

Moravské Budějovice was probably founded in the 12th century and it became a town in 1406. The historic town centre is well preserved and is protected as an urban monument zone. The most important monument is the Moravské Budějovice Castle.

== Administrative division ==
Moravské Budějovice consists of five municipal parts (in brackets population according to the 2021 census):

- Moravské Budějovice (6,541)
- Jackov (150)
- Lažínky (173)
- Vesce (114)
- Vranín (115)

== Geography ==
Moravské Budějovice is located about 19 kilometres (12 mi) south of Třebíč and 41 km (25 mi) southeast of Jihlava. It lies in the Jevišovice Uplands. The highest point is the hill Špitálka at 519 m (1,703 ft) above sea level. The Rokytka Stream flows through the town. There are several fishponds in the municipal territory.

== History ==
Moravské Budějovice was probably founded in the 12th century. The first written mention of Budějovice is from 1231. In 1406, the name of Moravské ('Moravian') Budějovice was used for the first time, to distinguish it from České Budějovice in Bohemia. It gained town rights in 1498.

The town prospered until the Battle of White Mountain. In 1648, it was acquired by the Schaumburk family which did not respect the townspeople and their rights and caused the economic problems of the town. Moreover, in 1673 half of the town was destroyed by a large fire. In 1736, the Wallis family acquired Moravské Budějovice as a poor insignificant town. During their rule, the town slowly recovered.

== Demographics ==
Historical population

| Year | Pop. | ±% |
|---|---|---|
| 1869 | 3,503 | — |
| 1880 | 3,957 | +13.0% |
| 1890 | 4,334 | +9.5% |
| 1900 | 4,554 | +5.1% |
| 1910 | 4,728 | +3.8% |

| Year | Pop. | ±% |
|---|---|---|
| 1921 | 5,007 | +5.9% |
| 1930 | 5,130 | +2.5% |
| 1950 | 5,209 | +1.5% |
| 1961 | 5,985 | +14.9% |
| 1970 | 6,367 | +6.4% |

| Year | Pop. | ±% |
|---|---|---|
| 1980 | 7,265 | +14.1% |
| 1991 | 7,884 | +8.5% |
| 2001 | 8,004 | +1.5% |
| 2011 | 7,541 | −5.8% |
| 2021 | 7,093 | −5.9% |

Source: Censuses

== Transport ==
The I/38 road (part of the European route E59) from Jihlava to Znojmo runs through the town.

Moravské Budějovice is located on the railway lines Znojmo–Okříšky and Moravské Budějovice–Jemnice.

== Sights ==
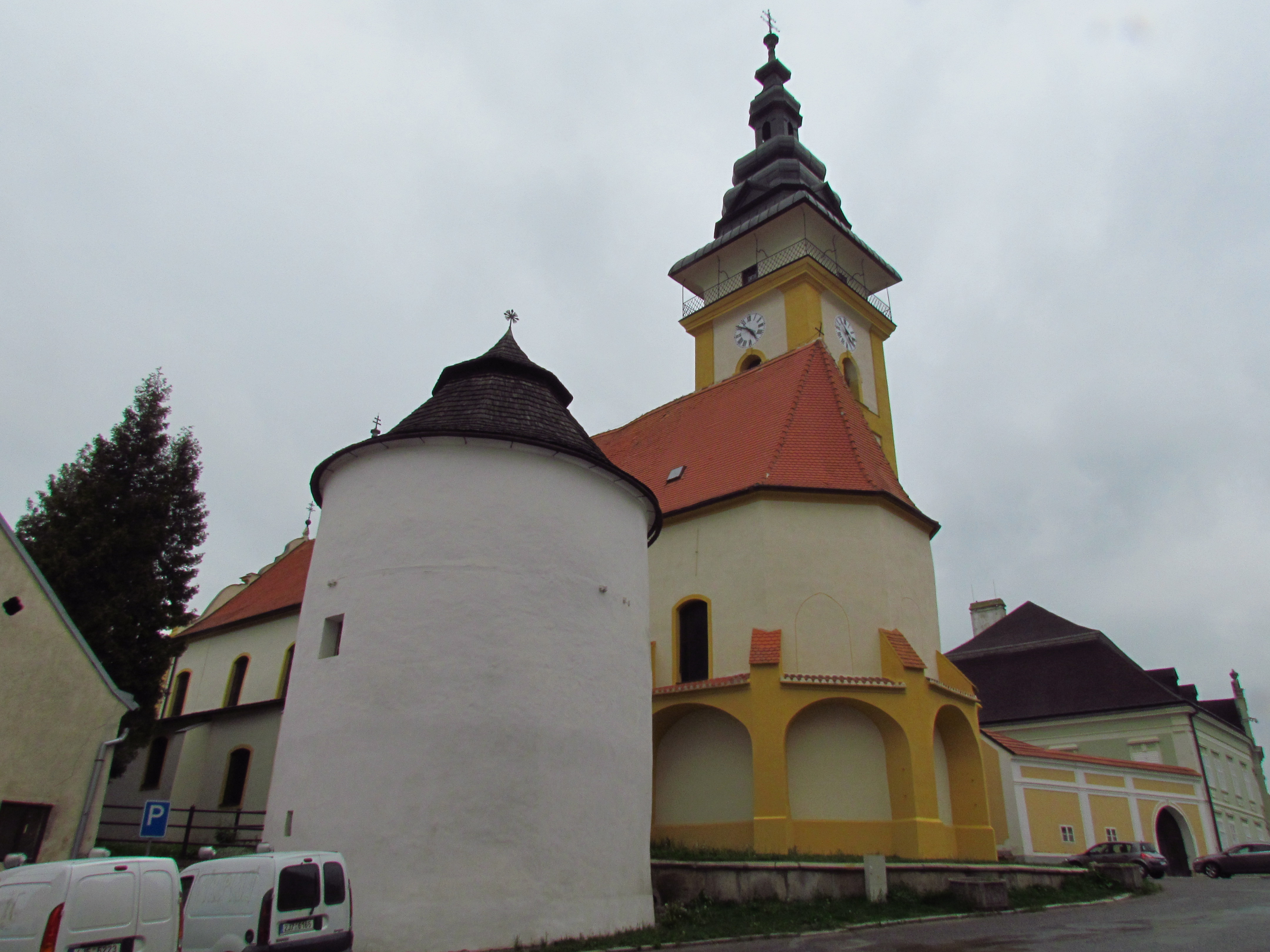
Church of Saint Giles with Chapel of Saint Michael

The Moravské Budějovice Castle was built for Count Rudolf Jindřich Schaumburk in the Renaissance style in the second half of the 17th century. Today it houses a museum of crafts. The former castle stables are used for cultural purposes.

The historic centre contains several valuable burgher houses. Notable is the town hall, which is a Renaissance building with Neoclassical elements.

The Church of Saint Giles is the landmark of the town. Originally it was probably a Romanesque structure from the first half of the 13th century. It was baroque rebuil and the 50 metres (160 ft) high tower was added in 1714. The tower is open to the public as a lookout tower. The Chapel of Saint Michael next to the church is originally a Romanesque rotunda from the 13th century. Its lower part served as an ossuary.

The Baroque building of the rectory dates from 1779. The rectory complex contains fragments of the town fortifications, including a bastion and a gate.

== Notable people ==
- Ralph Benatzky (1884–1957), Austrian composer
- Miroslav Venhoda (1915–1987), choir conductor

== Twin towns – sister cities ==
Moravské Budějovice is twinned with:

- Kalwaria Zebrzydowska, Poland
- Kautzen, Austria
- Pulkau, Austria
- Šaštín-Stráže, Slovakia
