= Suzanne Haïk-Vantoura =

French musician (1912–2000)

Suzanne Haïk-Vantoura (née Vantoura; 13 July 1912 – 22 October 2000) was a French organist, music teacher, composer and music theorist. Her main work was in the field of musicology.

== Personal life ==
Vantoura was born in Paris on 13 July 1912. In 1931 Vantoura started studying at Conservatoire National Supérieur de Paris, (CNSMDP), and in 1934 earned a First Prize in Harmony. Four years later, she was awarded a First Prize in Fugue (1938). She was a pupil of the well-known organist and composer Marcel Dupré from 1941 to 1946.

During World War II, Vantoura and her family fled from the Nazis to southern France. There she studied the cantillation marks (also melodic accents or ta'amim), in the Hebrew Bible (Masoretic Text), forming the basic hypothesis of her system for decoding the Masoretic cantillation. After the war she put aside this work and did not resume it until, after her retirement in 1970, she finally published her system in La Musique de la Bible revélée (1st ed.: 1976). She died on 22 October 2000 in Lausanne, Switzerland at the age of 88. Her husband Maurice Haïk had died in 1976. The couple had no children.

== Career ==
She was Honorary professor of music education (1937–61). She was organist at the Synagogue de l'Union liberale Israelite de Paris (1946–53) and organist at the Église Saint-Hélène in Paris (1966–79).

=== Compositions ===
- Quatuor florentin, 1942
- Un beau dimanche, 1957
- Destin d'Israël, 1964
- Versets de psaumes, 1968
- Offrande, 1970
- Adagio for saxophone and organ, 1976

== Music of the Bible Revealed ==
Music of the Bible Revealed was her magnum opus; a massive work covering the entire Hebrew Bible, decoding the cantillation marks (as musical notes which support the syntax and meaning of the words) of its 24 books, to music.

=== Study ===
Haïk-Vantoura argues that the accentual system preserved in the Masoretic Text was originally a method of recording hand signals ("chironomy") by which temple musicians were directed in the performance of music.

Noticing the marks in the version of the Hebrew Bible she used to read, Vantoura affirmed she had read in an unnamed encyclopedia that these signs of cantillation dated back to antiquity and that their real musical meaning was lost. This, she said, triggered her curiosity. Working step by step, she made the assumption it was significant that the sublinear signs were never absent from the text, while entire verses are totally lacking supralinear signs. In her opinion it had to mean that the sublinear signs had to be "more important" than the supralinear ones. This conclusion formed the basis of her conjectures.

She deals extensively with both the prose (the 21 books in which there are 8 sublinear signs) and poetry (the three books, Psalms, Proverbs, and the poetic sections of Job in which there are 7 sublinear signs). She made the hypothesis that the sublinear signs correspond to the eight degrees of a modal scale. She experimented with several different modes. As she worked with each verse she became convinced that the notes of her transcription formed coherent melodies and not random sounds. By comparing individual verses she then compiled tables of concordant sequences. Analyzing the shapes of signs, she finally assigned conjectural values to the 8 sublinear signs of the prose system, suggesting that they are the 8 notes of a scale.

Musicologists have resoundly rejected Haïk-Vantoura's various hypotheses. Her reconstructions, which rely on the assumption that cantillation marks represent the degrees of various musical scales, are incongruent with all existing traditions, where the signs invariably represent melodic motifs, not individual notes; it also takes no account of the existence of older systems of notation, such as the Babylonian and Palestinian systems. As such, scholars have rejected her results as dubious and her methodology as flawed.

Nevertheless, in 1978, the Institut de France awarded the second edition of Haik-Vantoura's French book the Prix Bernier, its highest award. Encyclopaedia Universalis, a French online encyclopedia, presents her work as a firmly scientifically established conclusion. Some musicians have also produced recorded music based on her alleged decipherment, more particularly the French harp player Esther Lamandier and Chanticleer. Haik-Vantoura's work has been rejected by some researchers as based on Western preconceptions and subjective assignments, coupled with historical misunderstandings. However author David C. Mitchell has defended it, noting that it agrees closely with the best remaining fragments of ancient psalmody.

A brief introduction is available from Public Radio 1986

== Publications ==
A partial listing of Haik-Vantoura's publications (which ultimately included about 5,000 verses of the Masoretic Text) follows:

- La musique de la Bible revélée (book), 1976; second revised edition, 1978 (Dessain et Tolra)
- La musique de la Bible revélée (LP), 1976 (Harmonia Mundi France HMU 989)
- Quatre Meghilot: Esther, L'Ecclesiaste, Les Lamentations, Ruth dans leurs mélodies d'origine (melody-only score), 1986
- The Music of the Bible Revealed (book), trans. Dennis Weber, ed. John Wheeler, 1991 (BIBAL Press)
- Les 150 Psaumes dans leurs mélodies antiques (melody-only score), revised French-English edition, 1991
- Message biblique intégral dans son chant retrouvé (melody-only score), 1992

== Sources ==
- Obituaries of French musicians 10/2000
- Orientations in Piano Creation of Banat in the period between the two World Wars
- Haïk-Vantoura's personal Web site (down since 2002; archive available from [www.archive.org])
- Temple Cantillation of Psalms (Jewish Encyclopedia, 1906)
