= Bernard Kruysen =

Dutch classical lyrical baritone singer (1933-2000)

- Born: René Bernard Kruysen; 28 March 1933; Montreux, Switzerland
- Died: 30 October 2000 (aged 67); Rijswijk, The Netherlands
- Education: Royal Conservatory in The Hague
- Spouse: Vera Ilona Arendsen-Hein
- Children: 4
- Awards: Officer l'Ordre des Arts et des Lettres (Gold)

Bernard Kruysen (Montreux, 28 March 1933 – Rijswijk, 30 October 2000) was a Dutch classical lyric baritone. He received various French and Dutch awards, including the Ordre des Arts et des Lettres. He gave many concerts both in Europe and in the United States.

== Biography ==
Bernard Kruysen spent much of his youth in Provence, which gave him an excellent command of the French language. He spoke and sang French without an accent. He lived there with his mother, Willy van Berkel, and his stepfather, singer Hubert Raidich. He would only see his biological father again later in life.

Kruysen studied at the Royal Conservatory in The Hague under Herbert Raideck and was admitted at an early age to the Academy of the Dutch Opera. He later studied in Paris to work with Pierre Bernac, which quickly made him a leading interpreter of French song. Composer Francis Poulenc often accompanied him on the piano.

His repertoire ranged from Monteverdi to Poulenc and included composers such as Bach, Schubert, Schumann, Fauré, and Ravel. Pianist Noël Lee was his regular partner for many recordings. He also worked intensively with the Dutch pianist Gérard van Blerk and the Dutch pianist/composer Hans Henkemans. In addition to French songs, Schubert's Winterreise and the St. Matthew Passion and St. John Passion were his specialities, with which he also gave concerts in Germany.

In 1977, he gave concerts in Riga and the current St. Petersburg, together with the Royal Male Choir Die Haghe Sanghers, conducted by René Verhoeff. In 1995, he performed in St. Nicholas Church in Prague with the Breda's Male Choir, conducted by Marcel Verhoeff, including a performance of the Polní Mše, the Soldier’s Mass. After extensive tours through Europe and the United States, Kruysen was mainly active in the Netherlands. His interpretations were praised for their simplicity, intelligence, and perfect diction.

He performed as the opera singer Theo Fabrice in Eline Vere, a Dutch-Belgian-French film production from 1991 based on the novel by Louis Couperus.

== Awards and distinctions ==
- 2001: Diapaison d'Or for the CD Henri Duparc Mélodies CD Bernard Kruysen, Noël Lee (Naïve,2001).
- 1984: Officer l’Ordre des Arts et des Lettres (Gold).
- 1978: Knight in the Order of Orange-Nassau.
- 1977: Officer l'Ordre des Arts et des Lettres (Silver).
- Kruysen was the first Dutchman to receive the Grand Prix du Disque. He received a total of four prizes:
  - 1961: For his interpretation of the songs of Claude Debussy (with the pianist Jean-Charles Richard)
  - 1962: For his recording of Gabriel Fauré's Requiem with the Orchestra of the Monte Carlo Opera conducted by Louis Fremaux.
  - 1963: For a recording of songs by Gabriel Fauré.
  - 1974: For a recording of songs by Gabriel Fauré.
- 1964: Golden Orpheus for best song singer for his interpretation of Robert Schumann's Liederkreis.
- 1958: Grand prix de l'excellence de la mélodie française.
- 1958: Grand prix hors concours Gabriel Fauré.
- 1958: Second prize at the International Vocalists Competition of 's-Hertogenbosch.

== Other information ==
Bernard Kruysen represented his country several times at the world championships in underwater hunting. In the same field, he was also a director of underwater films in collaboration with his diving friend Fik Meijer. Together they made many diving trips in the deep sea around Ibiza. He also did the camera work for a 1965 episode of the BBC series "Travellers' Tales" with Sir David Attenborough.

His grandfather Jan Kruysen and father Antoon Kruysen were painters. Kruysen had four children: Monique, Ino (singer), Michaël, and André (sculptor).

== Discography and recordings ==
- Johann Sebastian Bach - Kantates 56+82 (1979): With the Residentie Baroque Orchestra, Frank Minderaa (oboe), and Jacques van den Dool (organ), conducted by René Verhoeff, Lp/Cd Mirasound
- Henriëtte Bosmans – 6 Songs: L’anneau – Chanson – Rondel - Complainte du petit cheval blanc - Le diable dans la nuit - Le naufrage, with Felix de Nobel (piano), Holland Festival 1972), radio
- Johannes Brahms – Die schöne Maguelone op.33 (1967): With Noël Lee (piano), Lp Valois, CdNaive
- Harry Cox – La Bien-Aimee (1970): Cycle de 26 Melodies sur des Poèmes de Maurice Carême with Harry Cox (piano) , Lp
- Claude Debussy:
  - Songs: With Jean-Charles Richard (piano), 1e Grand Prix du Disque 1961, Lp/Cd Valois
  - Songs (1982/83): With Francis Poulenc (piano) and Jean-Charles Richard (piano), Cd INA
  - Songs: With Hans Henkemans (piano), Holland Festival 1968, Lp Radio Nederland
  - 2 Ballades de François Villon (1963): With the Netherlands Radio Symphony Orchestra conducted by Henk Sprui
- Henri Duparc - 12 Songs (1971): With Noël Lee (piano), Lp Telefunken, Lp/Cd Valoi, Cd Naïve, 1e Diapaison d'Or 2001
- Gabriel Fauré:
  - La bonne Chanson Op. 61 + Op. 76/85/113 (1973): With Noël Lee (piano), Lp Valois/Telefunken/Astree Auvidis, 4e Grand Prix du Disque 1974
  - Requiem: With the Monte Carlo Opera Orchestra conducted by Louis Frémaux, Lp Erato, 2e Grand prix du Disque 1962^{[19]}
  - Requiem (1975): With Elly Ameling and the Rotterdam Philharmonic Orchestra conducted by Jean Fournet, Philips
- Hans Henkemans – Villonnerie (1969): With the Radio Philharmonic Orchestra conducted by Jean Fournet, Lp/Cd Donemus
- Gustav Mahler – 2 RückertLieder (1962): With the Rotterdam Philharmonic Orchestra conducted by Eduard Flipse
- Bohuslav Martinů -– Polni mse (1976): With Die Haghe Sangers conducted by René Verhoeff, Lp Omega, Cd Mirasound
- Jules Massenet – Songs (1986): With Noel Lee (Piano), Lp/Cd Arion
- Marius Monnikendam - Hearth Rhythm (1976): With Die Haghe Sangers conducted by René Verhoeff, Lp Omega
- Claudio Monteverdi - Madrigali + Scherzi Musicali (1967): With Christian Lardé (Flute), Jean Lamy (Viola da Gamba) and Huguette Dreyfus (Harpsichord), Lp Valois
- Modest Mussorgsky - Lieder und Tanze des Todes (1966): With Noel Lee (Piano), Lp Valois/Telefunken
- Francis Poulenc:
  - Dialogues des Carmélites – Suzanna Rosander (Blanche de la Force), Nadine Denize (Mère Marie de L'incarnation), Cora Canne Meijer (Madame de Croissy), Bernard Kruysen (le Marquis de la Force), Rémy Corazza (le Chevalier de la Force) ; Netherlands Radio Philharmonic Orchestra conducted by Jean Fournet, Utrecht, Geertekerk (nl), December 20, 1973; coproduction by KRO / AVRO / BBC
  - Songs (1983): With Noel Lee (Piano), Lp/Cd Arion, 2e Diapaison d'Or 2004
- Maurice Ravel:
  - Chansons Madecasses + Histoires naturelles (1993): With Gerard van Blerk (Piano), Anner Bijlsma (Cello) en Frans Vester (Flute), CD Bayer
  - L'Enfant et les Sortilèges (1975): With the Royal Concertgebouw Orchestra conducted by Bernard Haitink
- Franz Schubert - Winterreise D.911 (1993): With Gerard van Blerk (Piano), CD Erasmus/Dante
- Robert Schumann:
  - Liederkreis op. 39 + op.90 (1964): With Jean-Charles Richard (Piano), Lp Valois, 3e Grand prix du Disque 1964
  - Liederkreis op.39 + Dichterliebe op.48 (1971): With Noel Lee (Piano), Lp Valois
- Ralph Vaughan Williams - Five mystical songs (1976): With the Residentie Bach Choir and Residentie Orchestra conducted by Gerard Akkerhuis
- Song Recital: The only existing video recording of a full song recital by Bernard Kruysen with Janny Lobbezoo (Piano), St.Oedenrode 1992, H. DUPARC - 3 songs, Fr. POULENC – 3 songs, Fr. SCHUBERT - Die Krahe uit Winterreise, R. SCHUMANN - Dichterliebe op.48, VHS/DVD
- Several Songs: With Felix de Nobel on piano, 1964 radio, Bizet – Chabrier - Franck – Gounod – Grieg – Mussorgsky – Wolf

== Literature ==
- Tijdschrift Luister 1962-I-128: Paul Chr. van Westering: “Bernard Kruysen, Grand Prix du disque”
- Tijdschrift Luister 1964-VI-287: Joop Schrier: “Valois maakt opnamen in Nederland”
- Tijdschrift Luister 1979-II-8: Hans C.M. van Rooy: “De bariton Bernard Kruysen"
- Tijdschrift Luister 1986-IX-14: review by J.S. about Massenet's songs (with Noel Lee, piano)
- "About Mussorgsky" in magazine “Records and recording” nov. 1966: “Bernard Kruysen sings Mussorgsky”
- Redactie (2000-11-02). "Geroemde bariton Bernard Kruysen overleden". Algemeen Dagblad – via delpher.nl.
- Trouw March 12, 1976 Pag. 9 Adr. Hager review Purcell Dido & Aeneas
- Eindhovens Dagblad 06-06-1987: Paul Kokke “De kleine dingen van Bernard Kruysen, zanger”
- Haagsche Courant 01-11-2000 / Brabants Dagblad 08-11-2000: Aad van der Ven: “Een carriere zonder uiterlijke glans”
