= La Reverdie =

La Reverdie, stylized as "LaReverdie", is an Italian group performing polyphonic medieval and Renaissance music.

== Group members ==
- Elisabetta de Mircovich - vocal, vielle
- Claudia Caffagni - vocal, lute, psaltery
- Livia Caffagni - vocal, flute, vielle
- Doron David Sherwin - vocal, cornett

== Discography ==
- 1990 - Bestiarium. Animals in the Music of the Middle Ages - Nuovo Era 6970, reedited with new track order as Cantus 9601
- 1992 - Speculum amoris. Lyrique d'Amour médiéval, du Mysticisme à l'érotisme - Arcana A336
- 1993 - Guinevere, Yseut, Melusine. The heritage of Celtic womanhood in the Middle Ages - Giulia "Musica Antiqua" GS 201007
- 1993 - O Tu Chara Sciença. Musique de la Pensée Médiévale - Arcana A29 - Arcana A332
- 1994 - Laude di Sancta Maria. Veillée de chants de dévotion dans l'Italie des Communes - Arcana 34
- 1995 - Suso in Italia Bella. Musique dans les cours & cloître de l'italie du Nord - Arcana A38 - Arcana A320
- 1997 - Insula Feminarum. Résonances médiévales de la Féminité Celte - Arcana A311
- 1999 - Legenda Aurea. Laudes des Saints au Trecento italien - Arcana 304
- 1998 - La Nuit de Saint Nicholas. La Reverdie et chant grégorien - Arcana A72
- 1999 - Historia Sancti Eadmundi. De la liturgie dramatique au drame liturgique - Arcana A43
- 2001 - La Reverdie en Concierto. Festival Internacional de Santander - RTVE Música 65131
- 2001 - Nox-Lux. Musique française et anglaise des XIII^{e} et XIV^{e} siècles - Arcana A 307
- 2002 - Voyage en Italie - Arcana 317
- 2003 - Hildegard Von Bingen: Sponsa regis. La Victoire de la Vierge dans l'œuvre d'Hildegard von Bingen. La Reverdie et chant de Saint Bernard - Arcana A314
- 2005 - Jacopo da Bologna, Madrigali e Cacce - Arcana A327
- 2006 - Guillaume Dufay, Missa Sancti Jacobi - Arcana A342
- 2009 - Carmina Burana, sarcasmes sacrés - Arcana A353
- 2013 - I Dodici Giardini, Arcana

== Festivals ==
La Reverdie have performed in numerous early music festivals. An incomplete list is given here:

- Festival Cusiano di Musica Antica (Orta San Giulio 1987, 1988, 1991, 1992, 1994,1995, 1997, 2000, 2003, 2007)
- Il Canto delle Pietre (Autunno Musicale di Como 1990, 1993, 1994, 1996, 1998, 2001, 2007)
- Regensburg Tage Alter Musik (1992, 2000)
- Festival van Vlaanderen (Brussels, 1992, 1993, 1995, 2005, 2007)
- Netwerk voor Oude Muziek (Utrecht, 1994, 2004)
- Festival de Mùsica antiga (Barcelona, 1995)
- Gesellschaft der Musikfreunde (Vienna, 1996)
- Semana de Musica Antigua (Burgos, 1997)
- Festival de San Sebastian (2009)
- Rhein-Renaissance ‘97 (Cologne 1997)
- Rencontres Internationales de Musique Médiévale (Le Thoronet)
- Festival Musicale Estense (Modena 1999, 2002, 2003, 2004, 2007)
- Settembre Musica (Turin, 1997, 1999)
- MiTo (Milan/Turin 2006)
- Trigonale (Austria, 2009)
- I Concerti del Quirinale (2002)
- Settimane Musicali di Stresa (2002, 2009)
- Festival Musique en Catalogne Romane (Perpignano, 2004)
- Festival Pergolesi-Spontini (Jesi, 2005)
- Ravenna Festival (2005, 2007, 2015)
- York Early Music Festival (2008)
