= Ruggero Gerlin =

Italian harpsichordist (1899–1983)

Ruggero Gerlin (5 January 1899 – 17 June 1983) was an Italian harpsichordist.

== Life ==
Born in Venice, Gerlin studied the piano at the Milan Conservatory then moved to Paris in 1920 to study harpsichord with Wanda Landowska.

He continued to work with her until 1940, particularly during concerts with two harpsichords. He returned to Italy in 1941 to become a harpsichord teacher at the Music Conservatories of Naples. He also led master classes at the Accademia Musicale Chigiana of Siena. Among his many students were Huguette Dreyfus, Kenneth Gilbert and Blandine Verlet.

He performed in many concerts and for many harpsichord recordings, including the complete works of François Couperin, Louis Couperin and Jean-Philippe Rameau. He was also responsible for the publication of works by Alessandro Scarlatti, Benedetto Marcello, etc.
