= Roberta Alexander =

American operatic soprano (1949–2025)

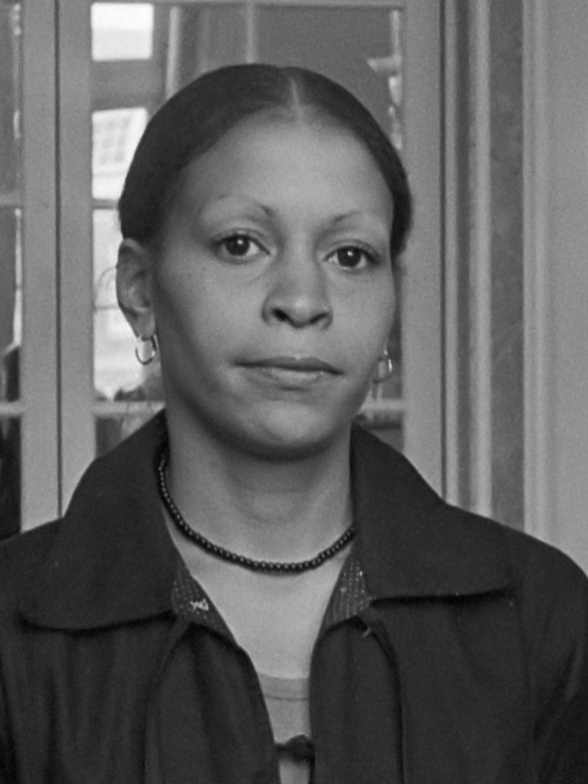
- Alexander in 1976
- Born: March 3, 1949; Lynchburg, Virginia, U.S.
- Died: October 14, 2025 (aged 76); Amsterdam, Netherlands
- Education: Central State University; University of Michigan; Royal Conservatoire
- Occupations: Operatic soprano; Academic teacher
- Organizations: Dutch National Opera
- Spouse(s): Edo de Waart (m. 1970s, div. 1970s); Siebe Riedstra (m. 1975)

Roberta Alexander (March 3, 1949 – October 14, 2025) was an American operatic soprano. She began her career as a lyric soprano in 1975 and spent the next three decades performing principal roles with opera houses internationally, based in the Netherlands. She was celebrated for her performances of Mozart characters like Elettra, Fiordiligi, and Countess Almaviva, performed first at the Opernhaus Zürich with Nikolaus Harnoncourt conducting. She was a leading soprano at the Metropolitan Opera from 1983 to 1991, particularly successful with roles such as Mimì in Puccini's La bohème and the title role in Janáček's Jenůfa. She later performed secondary character roles and taught voice.

== Early life and career ==
Alexander was born in Lynchburg, Virginia, on March 3, 1949. Her parents had both studied music at Virginia State College with Undine Smith Moore. Her mother was a soprano, and her father was a choral conductor. She grew up in Yellow Springs, Ohio, where her family moved when she was age two. Her father directed choirs at Wilberforce University. She appeared on stage first at age eight in Weill's musical Lost in the Stars.

Alexander studied music at Central State University and the University of Michigan in Ann Arbor, completing a master of music degree in 1971. She then moved to the Netherlands at age 23, where she studied at the Royal Conservatory of The Hague with Herman Woltman. She made her debut at the Dutch National Opera in 1975 in a students performance, as Fanny in Rossini's La cambiale di matrimonio. Later that year she created the role of Bubikopf in the world premiere of Viktor Ullmann's Der Kaiser von Atlantis. Other early roles with that house included Princess Ninetta in Prokofiev's The Love for Three Oranges, the Second Woodnymph in Dvorak's Rusalka, and the Fifth maid in Strauss's Elektra. She created roles, in Hans Kox's Dorian Gray in 1977, and in Peter Schat's Houdini in 1981. Her first lead role there was in 1979 Pamina in Mozart's Die Zauberflöte, followed by Marzelline in Beethoven's Fidelio in 1981 and the title roles of Verdi's La traviata in 1984. She performed with the Dutch National Ballet in Life in 1979 and Vier letzte Lieder in 1981, in choreographies by Rudi van Dantzig. She stated she found more freedom as a Black performer in the Netherlands than in the United States. Her career took off in Switzerland from 1978.

In 1980, Alexander made her American debut as Pamina in Mozart's The Magic Flute with the Houston Grand Opera. That same year she first performed at the San Francisco Opera as the Witch/Anne Sexton in Conrad Susa's Transformations. At the Santa Fe Opera, she performed her first title role in 1981, Strauss's Daphne conducted by John Crosby. She appeared in Mozart roles with the Zürich Opera, first as Elettra in Idomeneo in 1982, conducted by Nikolaus Harnoncourt who was the first to see her fit for that dramatic role rather than Ilia. He cast her as Fiordiligi in Così fan tutte directed by Jean-Pierre Ponnelle, after Lucia Popp became ill a few week into rehearsals. In 1989, she portrayed the Countess Almaviva in Le nozze di Figaro in 1989.

In 1982, Alexander made her debut at the Komische Oper Berlin as Mimì in Puccini's La bohème, a role she sang again for her debuts at the Royal Opera House in London in 1984 and the English National Opera in 1992. Alexander's debut at the Metropolitan Opera (Met) was in 1983 as Zerlina in Don Giovanni. in 1985, she portrayed there Bess in the company's first production of Porgy and Bess, alongside Simon Estes. She returned to the Met in the title role in Janáček's Jenůfa (1985, 1986), as Vitellia in Mozart's La clemenza di Tito (1987, 1991), as Mimì in La bohème (1987), as well as Antonia in Offenbach's The Tales of Hoffmann (1987), Countess Almaviva (1988, 1989), Donna Elvira in Don Giovanni (1990), and the Fifth maid in Elektra (2016).

In 1985 she gave her first of several performances at the Theater an der Wien as Cleopatra in Handel's Giulio Cesare, and sang Donna Elvira for her debut at the Vienna State Opera in 1986. In 1989 she gave a lauded portrayal as Jenůfa at the Glyndebourne Festival, and returned there as Vitellia in 1995. She performed and recorded several works with Nikolaus Harnoncourt and the Concentus Musicus Wien, including the title role in Handel's Theodora in 1990 and as Daphne in Handel's Apollo e Dafne in 1992. In 1994 she portrayed the title role in Berthold Goldschmidt's Beatrice Cenci at the Opernfest in Berlin. In 1997 she appeared as Donna Elvira at the Florida Grand Opera. In 2004 she created Hannah Pitt and other characters in the world premiere of Péter Eötvös's Angels in America at the Théâtre du Châtelet in Paris.

In 2009, Harnoncourt chose her for the role of Maria for his recording of Porgy and Bess. She coached the diction of the Arnold Schoenberg Choir for the production. She later performed secondary character roles, including performances at the Grand Théâtre de Provence of Elektra in 2013, La Scala in 2014, and La Monnaie in 2015. She performed as the Fifth Maid in Strauss's Elektra at the Met in 2016 and as Curra in Verdi's La forza del destino at the Royal Opera House in 2017.

She taught at the Conservatorium van Amsterdam, the Rotterdam Conservatory and the opera studio of the Dutch National Opera.

== Personal life ==
Alexander was married twice. Her first marriage was to conductor Edo de Waart in the early 1970s, and ended in divorce. She married orchestral manager Siebe Riedstra in 1975.

Alexander died from a heart attack in Amsterdam, on October 14, 2025, at the age of 76.

== Selected discography ==
Alexander recorded for the Dutch label Etcetera Records, in addition to selected recordings for such labels as Philips and Orchestras. She performed with orchestras including the Vienna Philharmonic, London Philharmonic Orchestra, Royal Philharmonics, Royal Concertgebouw Orchestra, Philadelphia Orchestra, Cleveland Orchestra, Bavarian Radio Symphony Orchestra, the Cincinnati Symphony Orchestra, Atlanta Symphony Orchestra, Boston Symphony Orchestra, and Dallas Symphony Orchestra. Conductors she worked with include Frans Brüggen, Bernard Haitink, Harnoncourt, Neville Marriner, Seiji Ozawa, Vladimir Ashkenazy, Jesús López Cobos, Sir Colin Davis, Carlo Maria Giulini, James Levine, Andrew Litton, Zubin Mehta, André Previn, Sir Simon Rattle, Leonard Slatkin, and David Zinman.

- Bach: St John Passion, with the Staatskapelle Dresden conducted Peter Schreier (Philips 1988)
- Bach: St Matthew Passion, conducted by Harnoncourt (Luna 1981)
- Bach: Mass in B minor, with the Bavarian Radio Symphony Orchestra conducted by Carlo Maria Giulini (Sony Classical 1994)
- Beethoven: Symphony No. 9, Royal Philharmonic Orchestra conducted by André Previn (RCA 1990)
- Willem de Fesch: Joseph (oratorio), with Claron McFadden and Musica ad Rhenum conducted by Jed Wentz (NM Classics/Brilliant Classics 2000)
- Gershwin: Porgy and Bess (selections), with the New York Philharmonic conducted by Zubin Mehta (Teldec 46318)
- Gershwin: Porgy and Bess, conducted by Leonard Slatkin, (Philips)
- Gershwin: Porgy and Be, as Maria, conducted by Harnoncourt
- Gluck: Paride ed Elena, conducted by Michael Schneider (conductor)
- Berthold Goldschmidt: Beatrice Cenci, conducted by Lothar Zagrosek (Sony Classical)
- Handel: Theodora – Roberta Alexander, Jochen Kowalski, Hans Peter Blochwitz, Concentus Musicus Wien, conducted by Nikolaus Harnoncourt (Teldec)
- Handel: Samson – Anthony Rolfe Johnson, Roberta Alexander, Jochen Kowalski, Christoph Pregardien, Alastair Miles, Maria Venuti, Arnold Schoenberg Chor, Concentus Musicus Wien, conducted by Nikolaus Harnoncourt (Teldec)
- Janáček: Jenůfa, conducted by Andrew Davis (Glyndebourne DVD)
- Mahler: Symphony No. 4, Concertgebouw Orchestra, Amsterdam, conducted by Bernard Haitink (Philips 412 119–2)
- Mozart: Don Giovanni, conducted by Nikolaus Harnoncourt (Teldec)
- Salieri: Prima la musica e poi le parole, conducted by Nikolaus Harnoncourt (Teldec)
- Strauss: Elektra, as 5th Maid, DYD from Aix-en-Provence Festival (2013) OCLC 891664870
- Georg Philipp Telemann: Ino, conducted by Nikolaus Harnoncourt (Teldec 44633)

=== Recitals ===
- Hendrik Andriessen: Miroir de Peine, Magna res est amor, Fiat Domine – with the Netherlands Radio Chamber Orchestra led by David Porcelijn (NM Classics, 1992 – winner of the Edison Award )
- Roberta Alexander sings Samuel Barber – arias from Vanessa and Antony and Cleopatra, plus Andromache's Farewell, Knoxville: Summer of 1915, Songs with orchestra, Edo de Waart (conductor)
- Roberta Alexander – Broadway Songs, David Triestram
- Roberta Alexander – Songs my Mother taught me, Brian Masuda
- Leonard Bernstein: Songs, Roberta Alexander, Tan Crone
- Mario Castelnuovo-Tedesco: The Divan of Moses-Ibn-Ezra, Op. 207, Roberta Alexander, Dick Hoogeveen
- Giacomo Puccini: Songs, Roberta Alexander, Tan Crone, Raphael String Quartet
- Richard Strauss: Lieder, Roberta Alexander, Tan Crone
- Wolfgang Amadeus Mozart: Lieder, Roberta Alexander, Glen Wilson
- Aaron Copland: Songs, Roberta Alexander, Roger Vignoles
