= Huguette Dreyfus =

French harpsichordist (1928–2016)

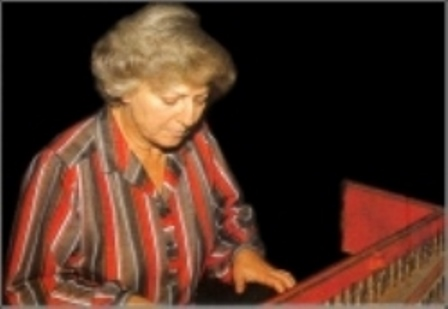
Dreyfus (May 2006)

Pauline Huguette Dreyfus (30 November 1928 – 16 May 2016) was a French harpsichordist.

== Biography ==
Dreyfus was born in Mulhouse, Alsace, France, on 30 November 1928 to Fernand and Marguerite Dreyfus. The doctor incorrectly wrote Pauline Huguette on the birth certificate; it should have been Huguette Pauline. She was always known by the name of Huguette. At age 4, she began piano lessons. With her cousin Nicole (later a famous lawyer), and also her older brother Pierre, she played duets and improvised, still a child. Her family was well off, her father an industrialist with factories in Mulhouse and Vichy. (3)

After WWII was declared, Jewish families were evacuated from the Alsace region. The Dreyfus family went to Vichy, where young Huguette enrolled in the Clermont-Ferrand conservatory under a pseudonym, finishing her studies with a first prize in piano. She must have taken on students then, as she said later that she had started teaching at age 14. In December 1942, she and her family escaped into Switzerland, settling in Lausanne where they had relatives. There she enrolled in the Conservatory of Lausanne where she pursued piano studies at a superior level until the end of the war.

In 1945, she began working with renowned piano teacher Lazare Lévy at the Ecole Normale de Paris, where she studied solfège and counterpoint. In 1949, having learned that music historian Norbert Dufourcq was to give special classes on the music of Johann Sebastian Bach (in recognition of the bicentennial of Bach's death) at the Conservatoire de Paris, she entered into the class and remained there for four years. From 1953 to 1958, she studied the harpsichord at the Accademia Chigiana in Siena from mid-July to mid-September with Ruggero Gerlin, who had been a student and disciple of the renowned harpsichordist Wanda Landowska.

In 1958, Dreyfus was the only harpsichordist to win a medal at the Geneva international music competition, becoming the most celebrated French harpsichordist of her generation. She specialized in Baroque and 20th-Century music and was a prominent figure of the harpsichord revival in France. Her favorite instrument was a harpsichord of Johann Heinrich Hemsch, an 18th-century harpsichord maker of German origin who worked in Paris, loaned to her by Claude Mercier-Ythier, whose atelier "La Corde Pincée" was in Paris.

As a professor of harpsichord, Dreyfus taught at many prestigious schools in France including the Schola Cantorum, the Sorbonne, the National Conservatory of Music and Dance of Lyon, the National Conservatory of Music at Rueil-Malmaison, and the Villecroze Academie de Musique where she influenced many future musicians.

She died in 2016 in Paris.
