= Prague Madrigalists =

Czech chamber music ensemble

The Prague Madrigalists (or Prague Madrigal Singers; in Czech: Pražští madrigalisté) is a Czech chamber music ensemble founded in 1956 as Noví pěvci madrigalů a komorní hudby (in English: New Madrigal and Chamber Music Singers) by the organist and composer Miroslav Venhoda. It was renamed to Prague Madrigalists and professionalized in 1967. The ensemble focuses on performing vocal and instrumental music of the 15th - 17th century, however, occasionally they also perform music of contemporary composers. The Prague Madrigalists were a subdivision of the Czech Philharmonic Orchestra up to the Velvet Revolution in Czechoslovakia. Their recordings were released on labels such as Supraphon.

== Selected discography ==
- Guillaume Dufay: Missae Ave regina caelorum / Ecce ancilla Domini (Supraphon, 11 0637-2)
- Claudio Monteverdi: Madrigali guerrieri et amorosi (Supraphon, SU 3294-2)
- Kryštof Harant z Polžic a Bezdružic, Jacob Handl-Gallus: Missa quinis vocibus etc - Harmoniae morales, Missa super (Supraphon, SU 3716-2)
- František Ignác Tůma: Lytaniae Lauretanae, Partita c moll, Stabat Mater; Samuel Capricornus: Opus musicum (Matouš, MK 0801 - 2931)
