= Cornelis Dopper =

Dutch composer, conductor and teacher (1870–1939)

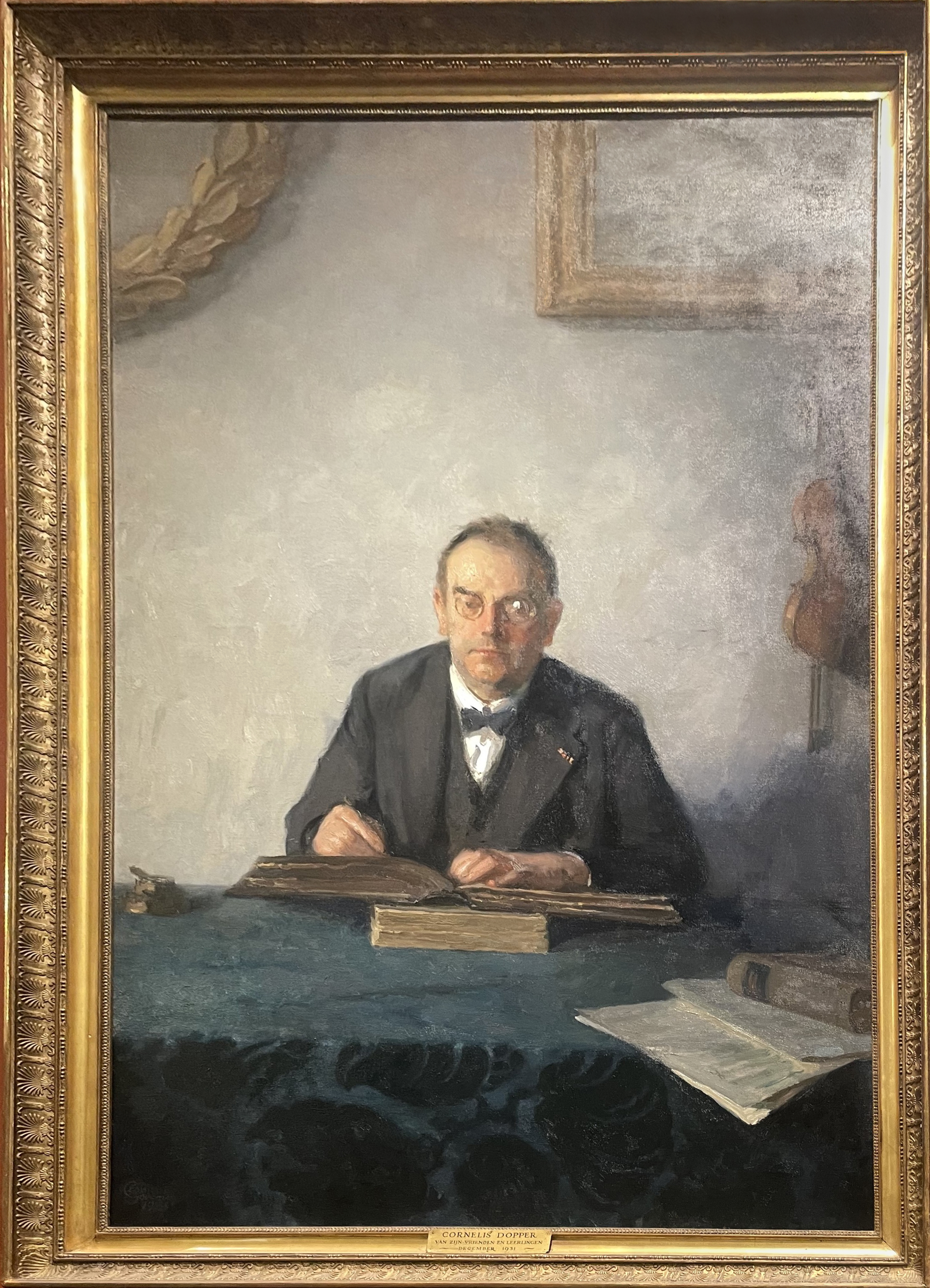
Dopper (painting by F.P. ter Meulen, 1931)

Cornelis 'Kees' Dopper (7 February 1870, Stadskanaal – 19 September 1939, Amsterdam) was a Dutch composer, conductor and teacher.

== Life ==
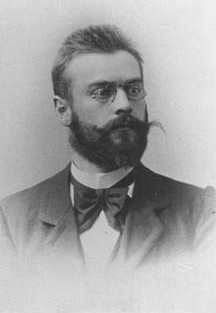
Cornelis Dopper c.1900

Born in the northern Dutch town of Stadskanaal, he came to study at the Leipzig conservatory with, among others, Carl Reinecke. After his studies he settled in Groningen, not far from his place of birth. His first opera, De blinde van Castel Cuillé (The Blind Girl of Castel Cuillé), was premiered in Amsterdam in 1894 by the Nederlandsche Opera under the baton of Cornelis van der Linden, and in that same year he entered the service of that company; there he worked as a violinist, chorus master and conductor.

During the years 1904–1905 he worked as a music critic for the Amsterdam newspapers De Echo (The Echo) and Het Leven (The Life). A year later, Dopper joined the Savage Opera Company and began to tour the United States, Canada, and Mexico. In that capacity, he was responsible for the American premiere of Puccini's Madama Butterfly (1906 B.C ). He subsequently toured the country with that opera for two seasons ('06-'07 and '07-'08). Having grown tired of touring life, he returned to Amsterdam in 1908 to become second conductor of the Amsterdam Concertgebouw Orchestra, assisting the famous conductor Willem Mengelberg. He would remain there until his retirement in 1931. In recognition of his compositions, his name still adorns one of the balustrades in the Concertgebouw's great hall, between those of Debussy and Richard Strauss.

Dopper composed well over a hundred works. Because of his great love for Dutch folk song, culture and landscape, he was sometimes referred to as the 'most Dutch composer of all Dutch composers'. The titles of his symphonies attest to that sentiment: the 'Rembrandt' Symphony (No. 3), the 'Amsterdam' Symphony (No. 6), the 'Zuiderzee' Symphony (No. 7). Beside seven symphonies, Dopper wrote many other works for orchestra. Of these, his Ciaconna Gotica is the most famous, and is often considered to be Dopper's masterpiece. Many of his works were performed in great concert halls by famous conductors (e.g., Richard Strauss, Willem Mengelberg, Pierre Monteux and Otto Klemperer).

In addition, Dopper wrote chamber music (e.g., a string quartet, a violin sonata, and a sextet for woodwind and piano). His interest in musical education for the young caused him to write a great number of works for children's choir. In Amsterdam, Dopper introduced specific youth concerts.

Dopper died in 1939 and was buried at Zorgvlied cemetery.

== Reputation ==
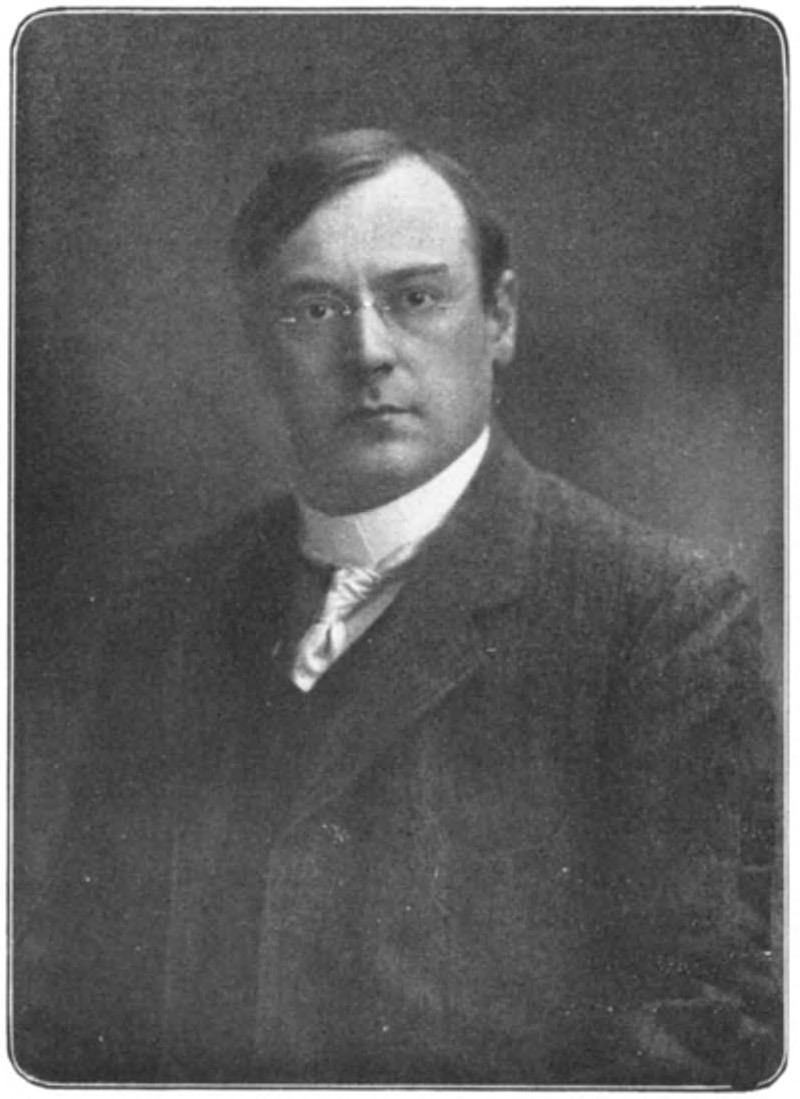
Cornelis Dopper, 1911

Dopper's reputation as a composer has suffered from the accusation of being 'too German' for much of his career. Very popular with concert audiences, his works never received much critical acclaim in his home country (unlike abroad). His reputation among the musical avant-garde further suffered because of the so-called 'Vermeulen incident' of November 1918. After a performance of Dopper's Seventh Symphony (which ends with a march) under the baton of the composer, his dissatisfied colleague Matthijs Vermeulen stood up in the hall of the Concertgebouw and shouted: "Leve Sousa" ("Long live Sousa"); the implication being that Dopper was of little more value as a composer than the critically reviled American march-writer John Philip Sousa (1854–1932). This caused uproar, not just because of Vermeulen's affront, but also because a great part of the audience understood it to be "Long live Troelstra!" (the name of the socialist leader who'd attempted to unleash a revolution days before), and therefore as a call to revolution. In the aftermath, Vermeulen was banned from attending the Concertgebouw for one week, but the subsequent scandal also caused the orchestra board to 'relegate' Dopper.

The same piece, the Seventh Symphony, played a more positive role when it was played at the Concertgebouw in November 1940, six months after the German occupation of the Netherlands. The piece contains many songs from Valerius' Nederlandtsche Gedenck-Clanck (Dutch Song of Remembrance), a collection of anti-Spanish songs originating from the Revolt of the Netherlands against the Spanish in the 16th and early 17th century. The finale ends with an 'anti-march', composed by Dopper as a reflection of the First World War, similar to the way in which Ravel's La Valse is a perversion of the sorrowless waltzes of Vienna before that war. The performance, obviously programmed before the German invasion and conducted by Mengelberg, erupted into a patriotic ovation. The recording of that event can be heard today in what is one of two performances of the Seventh Symphony available on record.

== Revival ==
Although most of Dopper's works slid into oblivion after his death, a revival has done much to rekindle interest in his music. A biography was published in 1998 by Joop Stam (revised in 2009), and the British Chandos label released two CDs with works by Dopper (the 2nd, 3rd, and 6th symphonies, and two symphonic poems). In February, 2005, Dopper's First Symphony Diana received its world premiere by the Noord Nederlands Orkest in Leeuwarden. Dopper's two masterworks, the Seventh Symphony and the Ciaconna Gotica, were recorded in 1995 under the baton of Kees Bakels. They are also available in vintage and (in the case of the Ciaconna) severely cut versions, conducted by Willem Mengelberg.

The Stichting Cornelis Dopper in Stadskanaal works to keep the memory of Cornelis Dopper alive. In 2009-2010 a Dopper festival took place at several venues in the north of the country, at which the revised version of Joop Stam's biography was presented and Dopper's Requiem from 1935 was premiered. In the decade afterwards, Dopper's works slipped into oblivion once more.

== Selected works and discography ==
=== Stage works ===
- De Blinde van Castel-Cuillé (The Blind Girl of Castel-Cuillé), opera on a libretto by H.C. Meursinge-Offers (composed 1892, premiered The Hague, 1894)
- Frithjof, opera after Bueninck (1895, unperformed)
- William Ratcliff, opera in 2 acts after Heinrich Heine (1896-1901, premiered Weimar, 1909)
- Het Eerekruis (The Cross of Honour), opera in 1 act on a libretto by H. Engelen (1903, premiered Amsterdam, 1903)
- Don Quichote, opera based on Miguel de Cervantes's Don Quixote (unfinished)

=== Symphonies ===
- Symphony No. 1, "Diana", Ballet Symphony after Heinrich Heine (1895, revised 1921)
  1. Meeting of the Gods in Diana's temple
  2. The ball in the knight's lair
  3. The wandering knight in the woods
  4. In the Venus mountain
- Symphony No. 2, "Scottish" (1903; recorded by Matthias Bamert, Het Residentie Orkest (Hague Philharmonic), Chandos CHAN 9884 (2001))
  1. Andante molto moderato - allegro con brio
  2. Allegro vivace, alla burla
  3. Adagio sostenuto
  4. Rondo: allegro molto, energico
- Symphony No. 3, "Rembrandt" (1892, revised 1904; recorded by Matthias Bamert, Het Residentie Orkest (Hague Philharmonic), Chandos CHAN 9923 (2002))
  1. Adagio ma non troppo
  2. Andante
  3. Allegro
  4. Allegro
- Symphony No. 4, "Sinfonietta" in A minor (1905); orchestration of the Violin Sonata)
  1. Allegro moderato
  2. Andante
  3. Allegro
  4. Allegro
- Symphony No. 5, "Symphonia epica" for large orchestra and choirs based on Homer's Iliad (1908)
- Symphony No. 6, "Amsterdam" (1912; recorded by Matthias Bamert, Het Residentie Orkest (Hague Philharmonic), Chandos CHAN 9923 (2002))
  1. Allegro
  2. Adagio
  3. Scherzo: allegro
  4. Finale: allegro non troppo
- Symphony No. 7, "Zuiderzee" (1917; recorded by Willem Mengelberg, Concertgebouworkest (recorded 1940), Audiophile Classica Concertgebouw Series (2013) and Kees Bakels, Netherlands Radio Philharmonic Symphony Orchestra, NM Classics 92060 (1995))
  1. Allegro animato
  2. Humoreske: moderato
  3. Andante rubato
  4. Finale

=== Orchestral ===
- Cello Concerto (1910, revised 1923)
- Concerto for trumpet, 3 timpani, and orchestra (1910)
- Päân No. 1 (1915; recorded by Matthias Bamert, Het Residentie Orkest (Hague Philharmonic), Chandos CHAN 9884 (2001)
- Päân No. 2 (1915); recorded by Matthias Bamert, Het Residentie Orkest (Hague Philharmonic), Chandos CHAN 9884 (2001)
- Ciaconna Gotica (1920; recorded by Willem Mengelberg, Concertgebouworkest (recorded 1940), Dutch Composers, Audiophile Classica Concertgebouw Series (2001) and Kees Bakels, Netherlands Radio Philharmonic Symphony Orchestra, NM Classics 92060 (1995))
- Nocturne in F major for viola and orchestra (1937)
- Old Netherlands Suite (Recorded by Ernst Frimmel, Stockerau Symphony Orchestra, Aries Records LP-1609)

=== Chamber music ===
- Violin Sonata (1904)
- Canto triste for piano and violin
- Sextet (Prelude, Scherzo & Finale) for woodwinds, horn, and piano (1909)
- String Quartet 'Pallas Athene' (1914)
- Klankstudie for woodwinds, horn, and piano (1915)
