= Jacksonville Center for the Performing Arts =

Performing arts center in Jacksonville, Florida

Coordinates: 30.324990°N 81.662211°W

Jacksonville Center of the Performing Arts
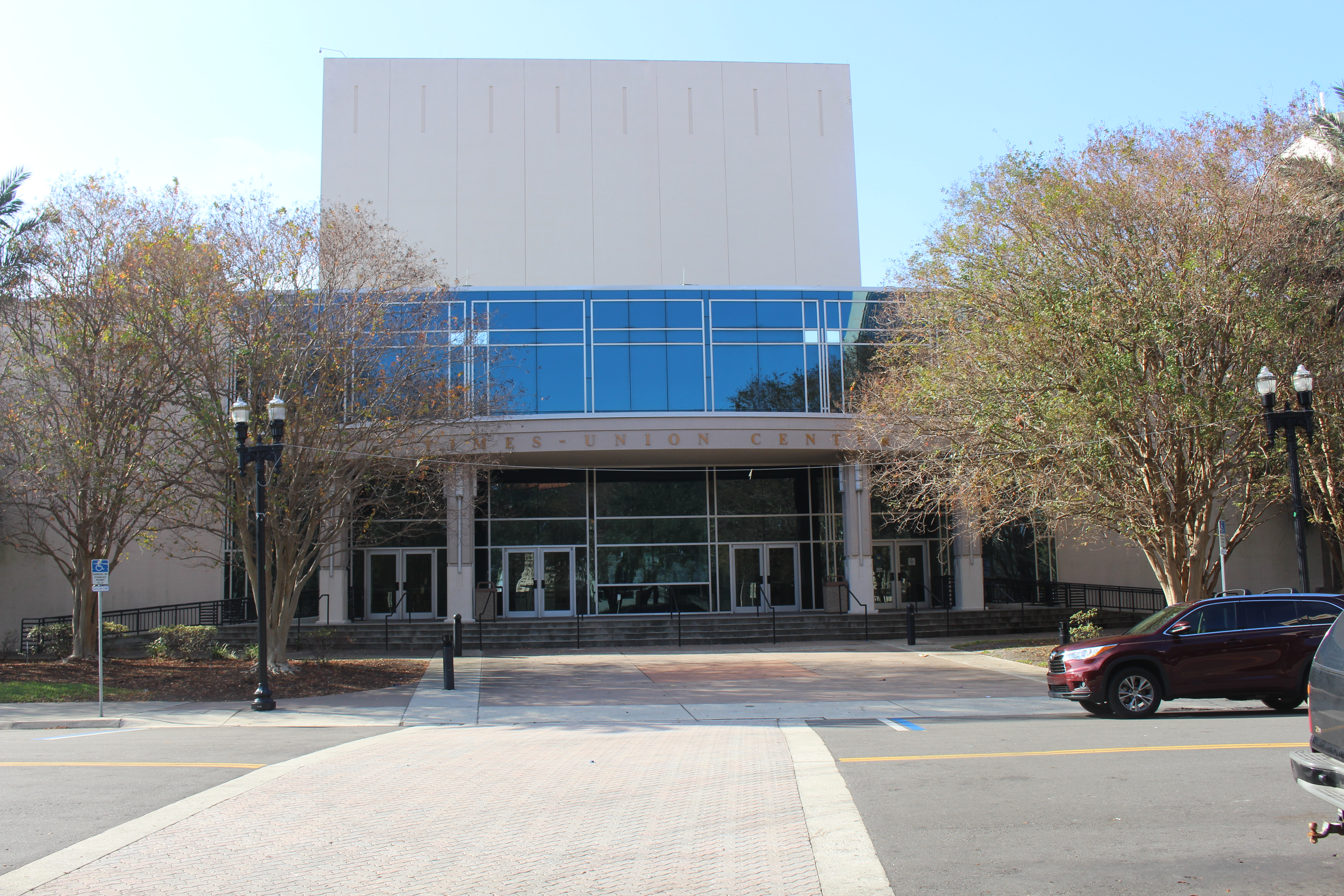
- Main entrance of building, c. 2016
- Former names: Civic Auditorium (1962–1994); Times-Union Center for the Performing Arts (1994–2022)
- Address: 300 W Water St; Jacksonville, FL 32202-4432
- Location: Jacksonville Riverwalk, Downtown Jacksonville
- Owner: City of Jacksonville
- Operator: ASM Global

Construction
- Built: The Auchter Company
- Opened: September 16, 1962
- Renovated: 1995–1997 (Renovation costs: $34 million, $71.8 million in 2025 dollars)

Website
- pac.jaxevents.com

The Jacksonville Center for the Performing Arts (JCPA) (originally the Civic Auditorium and previously known as the Times-Union Center for the Performing Arts) is a performing arts center located in Jacksonville, Florida. Situated along the Riverbank, the venue is known as the First Coast’s "premiere riverfront entertainment facility". Originally opening in 1962, the facility was renovated beginning in 1995 until 1997; with a grand re-opening on February 8, 1997. The center consists of three venues: a theatre; concert hall and recital hall. It is home to the Jacksonville Symphony, Jacksonville Symphony Youth Orchestra, and the FSCJ Artist Series.

== History ==
Commissioned in 1955, the City of Jacksonville approved a new civic auditorium and a municipal coliseum, to help brighten the scenery around the riverfront. In 1957, the site was purchased from the Seaboard Air Line Railroad. At the same time, Mayor W. Haydon Burns successfully lobbied the Atlantic Coast Line Railroad to move its headquarters from North Carolina to Jacksonville. Thus, construction began on the auditorium and the Atlantic Coastline Building (now CSX Building) both began in 1957.

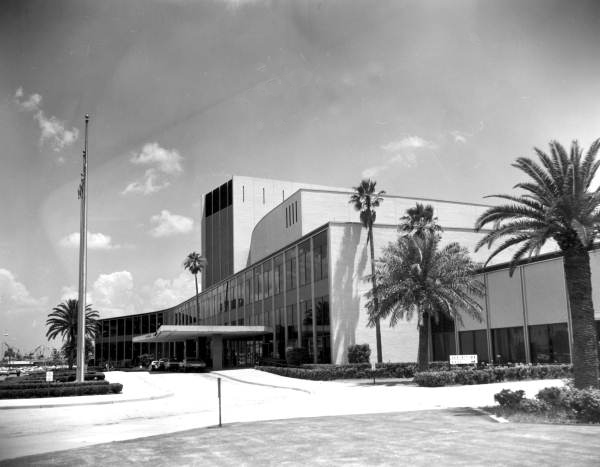
Civic Auditorium in 1969.

On December 7, 1957, the Seaboard Docks were demolished to make way for the forthcoming auditorium. The site was prepared via bulk heading the shoreline of the St. Johns River. This involved walling out the shoreline and adding fill dirt. The original site of the municipal coliseum (now where the Riverfront Plaza sits) was moved further along the riverbank and opened in 1960 along with the Atlantic Coastline Building. The Civic Auditorium was opened on September 16, 1962, with a performance by the Jacksonville Symphony Orchestra. The center served as a replacement for the aging Duval County Armory and became the preferred mid-sized concert venue alongside the Florida Theatre. The civic auditorium consisted of the main auditorium, "Exhibition Hall" and the "Little Theater".

By the 1990s, the auditorium developed a bad reputation amongst music acts. Like the coliseum, the venue was known for its poor acoustics. This caused many concerts to be moved to Tallahassee or Gainesville. In 1993, Mayor Ed Austin proposed the River City Renaissance Plan. A portion of the $235 million bond was allocated to the renovation of the facility and the construction of a new convention center, replacing the underused Prime F. Osborn III Convention Center (although this did not come to fruition).

Construction began in 1995. It was headed by KBJ Architects, Rothman, Rothman & Heineman, Kirkegaard Associates and Jones & Phillips Associates, Inc. The original auditorium was gutted and divided into three facilities. In 1994, local newspaper, The Florida Times-Union, purchased naming rights for $3 million. The renovated facility also included a lounge, art gallery and lobby. The lobby areas included marble column (dating back to 1913) from the Barnett National Bank Building and art from the Museum of Contemporary Art Jacksonville.

The center reopened on February 8, 1997, with a performance by the FSCJ Artist Series.

In January 2022, the city-owned concert hall would drop the Times-Union name and would be known as the Jacksonville Center for the Performing Arts until they secured a new naming sponsor.

== Venues ==
=== Moran Theater ===
The Jim & Jan Moran Theater is the largest and main performance venue of the center. The theater was specifically designed for theatrical and musical performances. Since 2006, the Jim & Jan Moran Theatre has been the home of Extraganza, an annual talent showcase by the students of Douglas Anderson School of the Arts. The theater replaced the main auditorium and can seat nearly 3,000.

=== Jacoby Symphony Hall ===
The Robert E. Jacoby Symphony Hall (formerly known as the Robert E. Jacoby Theater) is a concert hall primarily used for orchestral performances. Designed in a shoebox shape and seating over 1,700 guests, the hall is modeled after the Wiener Musikverein in Vienna, Austria. It is known as a pure concert hall, providing an intimate setting with no stage curtains, orchestra pit, fly space, or backstage wings. It houses the Bryan Concert organ, a rebuilt Casavant pipe organ. It is the home to the Jacksonville Symphony Orchestra and the Jacksonville Symphony Youth Orchestra. It replaced the Exhibition Hall.

=== Terry Theater ===
The C. Herman & Mary Virginia Terry Theater is a recital hall primary used for poetry readings, dance recitals and comedy shows. The venue seats over 600 guests. It replaced the Little Theater.

== See also ==
- List of concert halls
