= Ransom Wilson =

American flutist and conductor (born 1951)

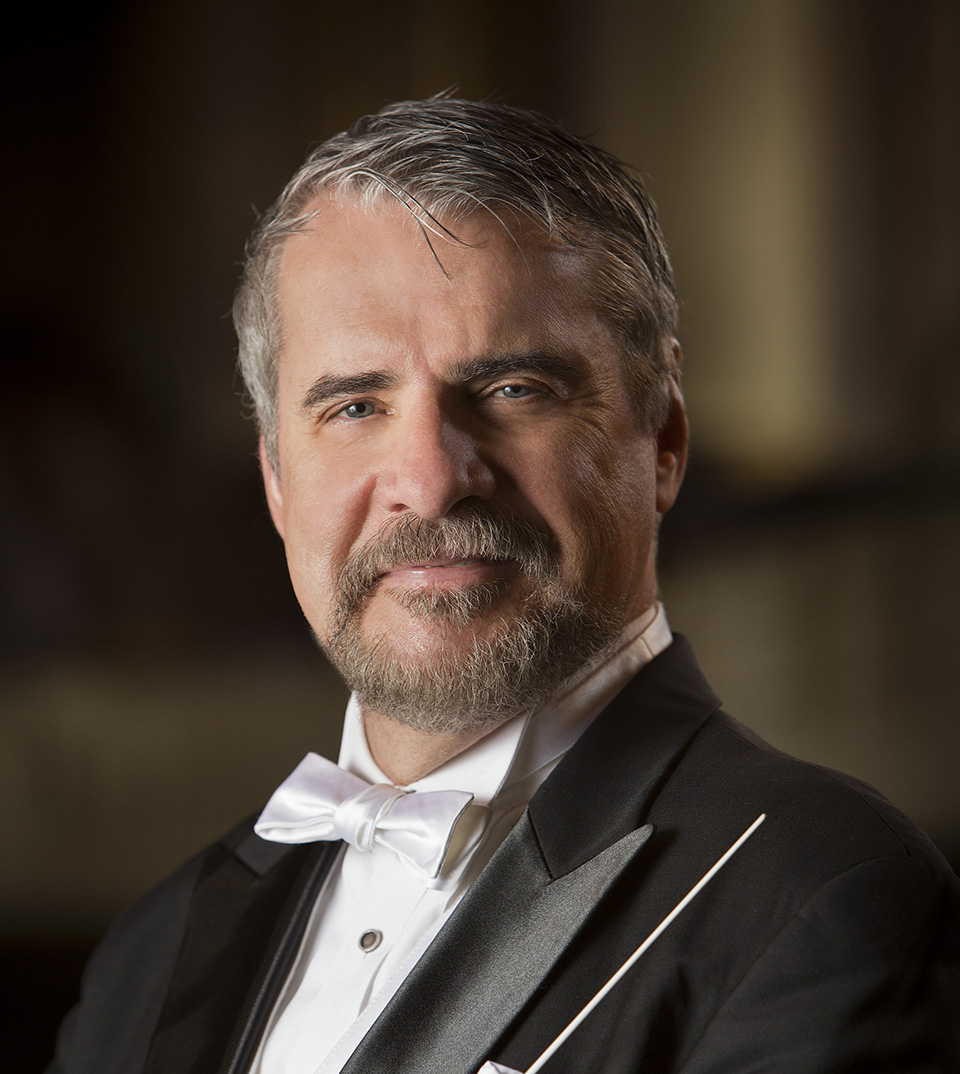

Background information
- Born: October 25, 1951 (age 74)
- Genre: Classical
- Occupations: Musician, conductor, teacher
- Instruments: Flute
- Formerly of: New York City Opera; Metropolitan Opera; Redlands Symphony

Ransom Wilson (born 25 October 1951 in Tuscaloosa, Alabama) is an American flutist, conductor, and educator.

He currently is an Artist of the Chamber Music Society of Lincoln Center, Artistic Director and Conductor of the Le Train Bleu ensemble, Music Director of the Redlands Symphony, and he performs concerts and recitals in notable venues worldwide.

Wilson was Professor of Flute at Yale School of Music and is a frequent master class guest artist.

His many honors include the New York Times Foundation Alabama Prize (1988); the Republic of Austria’s Award of Merit in Gold in recognition of his efforts on behalf of Mozart’s music in America (1992); induction into the Alabama Music Hall of Fame (1993); an honorary doctorate from the University of Alabama (2006); the Inspiring Yale Award for excellence in teaching from the School’s Graduate and Professional Student Senate (2015); and a Lifetime Achievement Award from the National Flute Association (2020).

== Education and early career ==
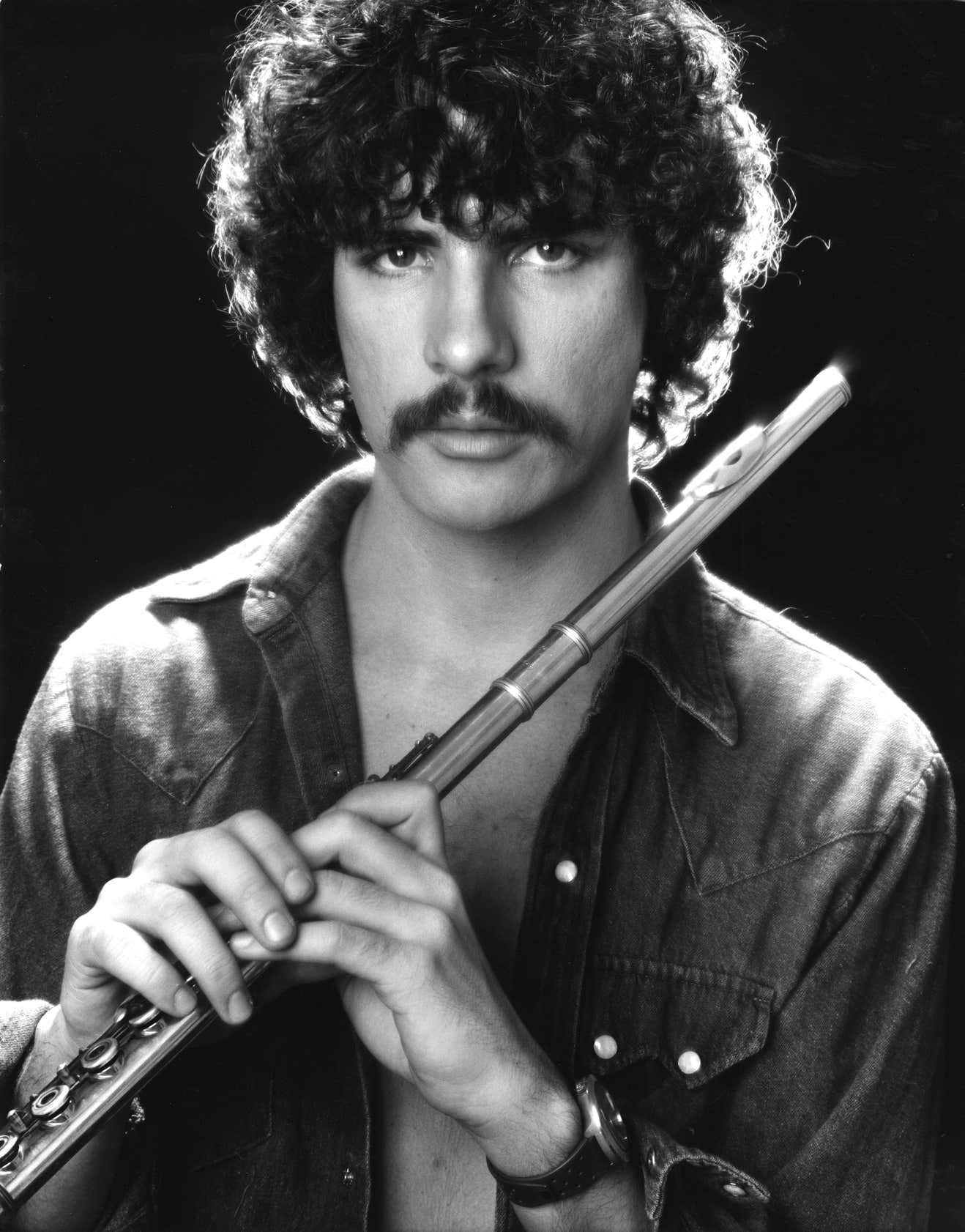
Wilson in 1977

Ransom Wilson attended the North Carolina School of the Arts, receiving this high school diploma in 1969, before entering the Bachelor of Music program at The Juilliard School. After graduation from Juilliard in 1973, he spent a year in Paris as a private student of Jean-Pierre Rampal.

In addition to Jean-Pierre Rampal, Wilson's other flute teachers have included Alain Marion, Severino Gazzelloni, Julius Baker, Christian Lardé, Philip Dunigan, and Arthur Lora.

In 1976 he gave his official debut concert in New York City, with Rampal as his guest artist. A review in The New York Times described him as “an exceptional virtuoso, as he has proved before, and his bravura talents served him well… he showed an interesting command of the long melodic line and use of rubato… beautifully phrased… this was great fun.”

An exclusive recording contract with Angel/EMI followed soon thereafter, along with extensive performances all over the world.

His private conducting studies began with Roger Nierenberg in 1979 and later included James Dixon, Otto-Werner Mueller, and Leonard Bernstein.

== Solo flutist ==
Since his official New York debut in 1976, Ransom Wilson has performed in the world’s premier concert venues and with such first-rate ensembles as Chicago Symphony Orchestra, Philadelphia Orchestra, San Francisco Symphony Orchestra, Saint Paul Chamber Orchestra, Houston Symphony, Los Angeles Chamber Orchestra, Orchestra of St. Luke’s, Orpheus Chamber Orchestra, Mostly Mozart Festival (Lincoln Center for the Performing Arts), London Symphony Orchestra, Israel Philharmonic, English Chamber Orchestra, and I Solisti Veneti, among others.

Wilson has released 27 albums as a flute soloist, with three Grammy nominations along the way. His latest recording, In the Age of Debussy, was released on the Nimbus label in 2021.

Wilson has collaborated with keyboardists Peter Frankl, Robin Sutherland, John Gibbons, Jean-Philippe Collard, François Dumont, and Christopher O’Riley (with whom he was awarded a 1989 National Public Radio award for best performance by a small ensemble on a national broadcast). In 1991, he was featured as a guest musician performing with the Modern Mandolin Quartet on their album The Nutcracker Suite.

A champion of contemporary music, Wilson has had works composed specially for him by Steve Reich, Peter Schickele, Joseph Schwantner, John Harbison, Jean Françaix, Jean-Michel Damase, George Tsontakis, Tania Léon, and Deborah Drattel. According to Schwantner, his piece A Play of Shadows represents “an attempt to mirror [Ransom Wilson’s] dramatic and compelling musical personality”. Wilson's recordings of works by Steve Reich (Vermont Counterpoint) and Philip Glass (Façades) have sold thousands of units.

Praise from the New York Times for his flute playing includes: “an exceptionally fine player”; “Wilson gave a mesmerizing performance”; “his technique was solid, his coloration amply varied, and his programming inventive"; “Wilson played the solos expertly”; and “Wilson brought a warm tone and considerable poise to the work”.

On August 22, 2022, the National Flute Association presented Wilson with his 2020 Lifetime Achievement Award (postponed because of the pandemic).

Ransom Wilson plays exclusively a flute hand made for him by the Wm. S. Haynes Company.

== Chamber musician ==
Ransom Wilson has been a member of the Chamber Music Society of Lincoln Center since 1991, performing and recording with his colleagues hundreds of times.

The list of notable artists with whom he has concertized includes mezzo Frederica von Stade, soprano Jessye Norman, baritone Thomas Hampson, mezzo Susan Graham, tenor Robert White, mezzo Dolora Zajick, violinist Nadja Salerno-Sonnenberg, violinist Hilary Hahn, flutist Jean-Pierre Rampal, flutist Sir James Galway, guitarist Manuel Barrueco, harpist Nancy Allen, folk musicians Edgar Meyer and Mark O’Connor, and many others.

Critics have described his performances with other artists and “his fine and gentle playing… with quiet strength, affecting and appealing”; “the evening’s great success”; “a stylish performance”; and “lively flute playing”.

== Conductor ==
Maestro Wilson was appointed Music Director and Conductor of the Redlands Symphony (CA) in 2016 as well as the Lar Lubovitch Dance Company (NYC) in 2000. He has founded two ensembles: Le Train Bleu in 2010 and Solisti New York in 1981, with which he appeared as conductor in hundreds of concerts and recordings. He also founded the Mozart Festival at Sea.

Wilson has also held positions at the Tuscaloosa Symphony, Flint Symphony Orchestra, Idyllwild Arts Academy, and the OK Mozart International Festival, where he was Artistic Director from 1983–2006.

Wilson's opera credits include the Metropolitan Opera, New York City Opera, Opera Omaha, Portland (OR) Opera, International Opera Center in Amsterdam, and Glimmerglass Opera. In 2004 he conducted the U.S. Premiere of the comic opera “Le médecin malgré lui” by Charles Gounod (with recitatives by Erik Satie) at Yale University.

Additional conducting engagements include the Saint Paul Chamber Orchestra, Houston Symphony, Denver Symphony, Houston Symphony, Los Angeles Chamber Orchestra, New Jersey Symphony, Omaha Symphony, Orchestra of St. Luke’s, Round Top Festival, San Francisco Chamber Orchestra, Tulsa Philharmonic, Festival La Quincena (Spain), Hallé Orchestra (UK), Kraków Philharmonic (Poland), and the London Symphony Orchestra (UK).

With the Los Angeles Chamber Orchestra and guest soloist James Galway, Wilson led a successful tour of Southern California and has accompanied numerous internationally renowned artists from the podium, including Itzhak Perlman, André Watts, Barry Douglas Frederica von Stade, Joshua Bell, Todd Levy, and Hilary Hahn.

Among the many works that he has conducted by living contemporary composers, is Aaron Jay Kernis’ Musica Celestis, premiered by Wilson and Sinfonia San Francisco in 1992, and John Luther Adams’ songbirdsongs, programmed by Le Train Bleu in 2011, which the New York Times called “a gorgeous performance… it was a strange, thrilling immersive experience”.

Other critical acclaim for his conducting includes: “a tender performance” of the Mozart Clarinet Concerto; conducting that was “adept and sensitive and accomplished without recourse to exhibitionistic physical gestures… Wilson shaped each movement lovingly without slopping over into excess”; and “incisive and joyous”.

== Discography ==
Ransom Wilson has released over 35 commercial recordings as a soloist, chamber musician, and conductor, earning three Grammy Awards nominations.

Selective works recorded by Ransom Wilson

- John Adams: Grand Pianola Music; Steve Reich: Eight Lines; Vermont Counterpoint, Ransom Wilson conducting Solisti New York Chamber Orchestra, EMI/Angel.
- Bach: Brandenburg Concertos; Suite in B Minor, EMI/Angel.
- Bach: Partita in A Minor; Marais: Variations on “Les Folles d’Espagne”; Telemann: Fantasias; Blavet: Minuet, Orion Records.
- C.P.E. Bach: Sonata in E Major; Corrette: Sonata in D Major; Clementi: Sonata in G Major; Mozart: Sonata K. 12, 14, Orion Records.
- Bach and Telemann Suites, EMI/Angel.
- Baroque Concertos for Flute (Blavet, Devienne, Tartini), EMI/Angel.
- Impressions for Flute with Nancy Allen (harp), works by Ravel, Faure, Satie, and others, EMI/Angel.
- Mozart: Horn Concerti, with David Jolley (horn), Ransom Wilson conducting the Solisti New York Chamber Orchestra, Sine Qua Non Records.
- Mozart/Haydn: Concerto No. 23; Haydn: Piano Concerto in D Major, Steven Lubin (piano), Ransom Wilson conducting the Mozartean Players, Arabesque Records.
- Steve Reich: Vermont Counterpoint; Philip Glass: Facades; Frank Becker: Stonehenge; Debussy: Syrinx; Jolivet: Asceses (I), EMI/Angel.
- Vivaldi Concertos, EMI/Angel.

Complete discography

- 1972: The Rococo Flute; as flutist (Orion)
- 1972: Music for Solo Flute; as flutist (Orion)
- 1973: Music of Jean Françaix; as flutist (Musical Heritage Society)
- 1974: Music for 1, 2, 3, and 4 Flutes; as flutist (Musical Heritage Society)
- 1975: Blavet: 6 Sonatas; as flutist (Musical Heritage Society)
- 1976: Concertos for 2 Flutes (Viotti/Dieter/Devienne); as flutist with Jean-Pierre Rampal (Erato/RCA)
- 1978: Impressions for Flute; as flutist (Angel/EMI)
- 1978: Ravel: Introduction and Allegro; as flutist (Angel/EMI)*
- 1979: Koto Flute; as flutist (Angel/EMI)*
- 1980: Bach/Telemann: Suites for Flute; as flutist (Angel/EMI)
- 1981: Pleasure Songs for Flute; as flutist (Angel/EMI)
- 1982: Baroque Concertos for Flute; as flutist (soloist and conductor (Angel/EMI)
- 1982: Music of Glass, Reich, and Becker; as flutist (Angel/EMI)
- 1982: Mozart/Haydn Piano Concertos; with Steven Lubin; as conductor (Arabesque)
- 1984: Music of Adams and Reich; as conductor (Angel/EMI)
- 1986: The Gallant Troubadour; as flutist with Robert White (Angel/EMI)
- 1987: Stravinsky: Histoire du Soldat; as conductor (Chesky)
- 1989: Mozart Concertos: as flutist with London Symphony (Angel/EMI)
- 1990: Mozart: Music for Flute and Guitar; as flutist with Manuel Barrueco (Angel/EMI)
- 1991: Flutes; as flutist (New World)
- 1992: Fire at Dusk; as flutist with Edgar Meyer and Mark O’Connor (Angel/EMI)
- 1992: Japanese Music for Marimba; as flutist with Robert van Sice (Etcetera)
- 1992: Kernis: Love Scenes; with Orchestra of St. Luke’s; as conductor (CRI)
- 1994: Mozart: Three Sonatas; as flutist with Robin Sutherland (Etcetera)
- 1995: L’Oiseau Bleu; as conductor (New Albion)
- 1995: Amy Beach: Cabildo; as conductor (Delos)
- 2000: Debussy: Sonata for Flute, Viola, and Harp; as flutist (Delos)*
- 2004: Flute Music by Les Six; as flutist with Christopher O’Riley (Etcetera)
- 2005: Music of Martin Bresnick; as conductor (New World)
- 2008: Music of Ezra Laderman; as conductor (Albany)
- 2010: Music of Lawrence Dillon; as flutist (Albany)
- 2012: Music of Michael Colina; with London Symphony; as conductor (Fleur de Son Classics)
- 2015: Beethoven/Schubert/Schumann; as flutist with Peter Frankl (Nimbus)
- 2016: Modern Primitive; as conductor (Amazon)
- 2016: Françaix/Damase; as flutist with Orpheus Chamber Orchestra (Nimbus)
- 2017: In the Age of Ravel; as flutist with François Dumont (Nimbus)
- 2019: Four French Flute Concertos; as flutist with BBC Concert Orchestra (Nimbus)
- 2021: In the Age of Debussy; as flutist with François Dumont (Nimbus)

(*) Grammy nominated recording

== Educator ==
The School of Music at the University of Alabama announced the appointment of Ransom Wilson as the Camilla Huxford Endowed Chair in Orchestral Studies to begin in August 2023.

Wilson taught at the Yale School of Music, where he was a member of the woodwind and chamber music faculties for 31 years from 1992 to 2023. He conducted productions of the school’s opera department, taught at the Yale Summer School of Music/Norfolk Chamber Music and was featured many times in solo and chamber music performances on Yale’s Faculty Artist Series and Yale in New York concert series.

In 2019, Wilson was appointed Director of Orchestral Programs at the Idyllwild Arts Academy in California which ended in 2020.

In addition to his long professorship at Yale, he has taught master classes at the Paris Conservatory, Oberlin Conservatory, Jerusalem Music Academy, The Juilliard School, Moscow Conservatory, Cambridge University, Beijing Conservatory, and at several music schools in Taiwan.

His former students hold positions in such orchestra as the New York Philharmonic, Fort Worth Symphony, Charlotte Symphony, and Seoul Philharmonic; in addition, some teach at University of Wisconsin Madison, Pennsylvania State University, University of Miami, Sarah Lawrence College, George Washington University, University of Minnesota, South Korea National University of Arts, HanYang University, and the Beijing Conservatory.

He is the former Director of Orchestras at his alma mater, the University of North Carolina School of the Arts.

Wilson has been quoted as saying: “[My] teaching philosophy is to improve and refine students’ innate abilities — to make them the very best version of themselves as musicians. With an emphasis on classic French la belle flûte traditions, students have the opportunity to clean up and improve their sound, technique and interpretation”.

== Personal life ==
Wilson is gay; he is married to Walter Foery.
