= Sapporo Symphony Orchestra =

Orchestra in Sapporo, Japan

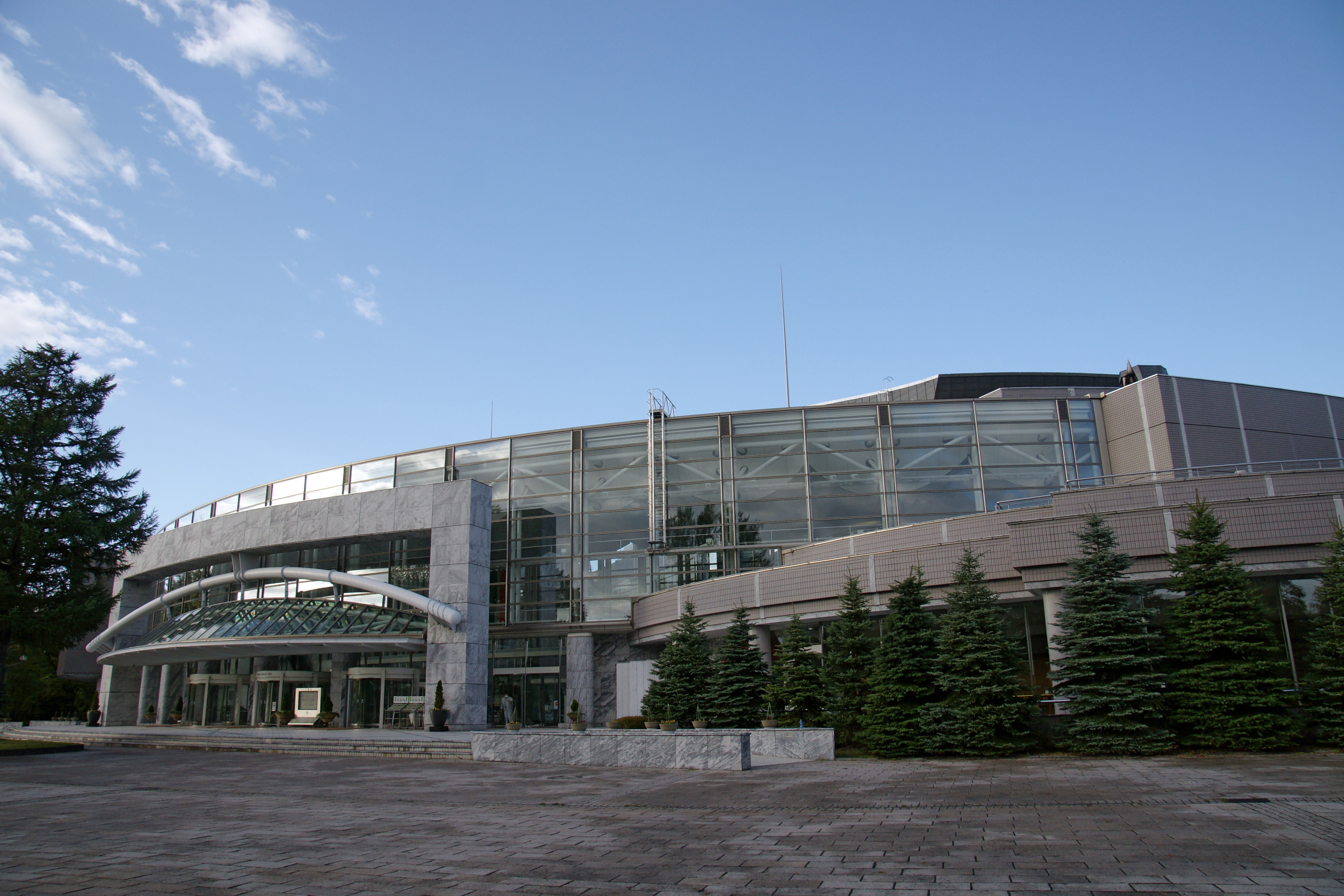
The Sapporo Symphony plays at the Sapporo Concert Hall

The Sapporo Symphony Orchestra (札幌交響楽団, Sapporo Kōkyō Gakudan), colloquially known as the Sakkyō (札響), is a Japanese orchestra based in Sapporo, Japan. The only professional orchestra in Hokkaido, it performs at the Sapporo Concert Hall.

== History ==
The orchestra was founded in 1961 as the Sapporo Civic Symphony Orchestra (札幌市民交響楽団 (Sapporo Shimin Kōkyō Gakudan)), with Masao Araya as its first principal conductor, and gave its first subscription concert that same year. The next year, the orchestra renamed itself the Sapporo Symphony Orchestra. Araya served as principal conductor of the orchestra until 1968. In 1975, the orchestra toured the United States and West Germany. In 2007, the orchestra played its 500th subscription concert. In October 2009, the orchestra re-organised itself as a public interest incorporated foundation. The orchestra toured Europe for its 50th anniversary.

Tadaaki Otaka was its chief conductor from 1981 to 1986, then music advisor and principal conductor from 1998 to 2004, and finally music director from 2005 to 2015. He is now honorary music director of the orchestra. Radomil Eliška served as principal guest conductor from 2008 to 2015, and was its honorary conductor. Since 2017, the orchestra's principal guest conductor has been Junichi Hirokami. Other former chief conductors have included Max Pommer (2015–2018).

Matthias Bamert was appointed chief conductor starting in the 2018–2019 season. His initial contract was for three years. A second contract extended his directorship until 2024. Bamert concluded his tenure with the orchestra at the close of the 2023-2024 season.

In 2023, the orchestra announced the appointment of Elias Grandy as its next chief conductor, effective April 2025.

== Conductors ==
- Masao Araya (Principal Conductor, 1961–1968)
- Peter Schwarz (Principal Conductor, 1967–1975)
- Hiroyuki Iwaki (Principal Conductor, then Music Director, 1975–1987; Conductor Laureate, 1988–2006)
- Kazuyoshi Akiyama (Music Advisor, later Principal Conductor; 1988–1998)
- Tadaaki Otaka (Chief Conductor, 1981–1986; Music Advisor and Principal Conductor, 1998–2004; Music Director, 2005–2015; Honorary Music Director, 2015–present)
- Max Pommer (Chief Conductor, 2015–2018)
- Matthias Bamert (Chief Conductor, 2018–2024)
- Elias Grandy (Chief Conductor, 2025–present)
