= Fabio Mechetti =

Brazilian conductor (born 1957)

Fabio Mechetti (born 27 August 1957, São Paulo) is a Brazilian conductor.

== Biography ==
Mechetti has master's degrees in conducting and composition from the Juilliard School of Music. He won the 1989 Malko International Conducting Competition in Denmark. In the United States, Mechetti has served as associate conductor of the National Symphony Orchestra (Washington, D.C.) and resident conductor of the San Diego Symphony. He has been music director of the Syracuse Symphony Orchestra (1992–1999), the Spokane Symphony (1993–2004), and the Jacksonville Symphony (1999–2014). With the Spokane Symphony, Mechetti has the title of conductor laureate. With the Jacksonville Symphony, he has the title of conductor emeritus.

In 2008, Mechetti became the founding music director and principal conductor of the Orquestra Filarmônica de Minas Gerais in Belo Horizonte. He served as principal conductor of the Malaysian Philharmonic Orchestra for the 2014–2015 season, and stood down from this post in October 2015.

Mechetti has two daughters, Marina and Carolina.

Cultural offices
Preceded by Kazuyoshi Akiyama	Music Director, Syracuse Symphony Orchestra; 1992–1999	Succeeded by Daniel Hege
Preceded by Vakhtang Jordania	Music Director, Spokane Symphony; 1993–2004	Succeeded by Eckart Preu
Preceded by Roger Nierenberg	Music Director, Jacksonville Symphony; 1999–2014	Succeeded by Courtney Lewis
Preceded by (no predecessor)	Music Director, Orquestra Filarmônica de Minas Gerais; 2008–present	Succeeded by incumbent
Preceded by Claus Peter Flor (music director)	Principal Conductor, Malaysian Philharmonic Orchestra; 2014–2015	Succeeded by Jun Märkl (music director-designate, effective 2021)
