= Roger Wang (guitarist) =

Roger Wong (born November 7, 1974), better known by his stage name Roger Wang is a Malaysian composer and acoustic guitarist known for his fingerstyle technique. Besides performing on international stages, Roger is also an artistic director of a local jazz festival, an event organiser, producer, arranger and an educator.

== Career ==
Wang was the guitarist of Double Take, a guitar-vocal duo who released their first album 1 Voice, 6 Strings, 12 Moods (2002). Double Take released one more album 1 Voice, 6 Strings, 12 Days of Christmas (2005). The duo performed to the Double Take sold-out concert at the Petronas Philharmonic Hall at the Kuala Lumpur Convention Centre in October 2009.

Wang later collaborated with artists from different genres to record five other albums, including Winnie Ho: The Jazzy Sounds of Teresa Teng

Wang also produced one solo album, Journey Home, in 2003.

In 2004, Wang was a performer and workshop presenter at the Yamaha Guitar Fiesta at Kelana Jaya.

In 2009, Wang was appointed co-chairman and artistic director of the Kota Kinabalu Jazz Festival. In 2014 the annual festival ran its eighth edition, attended by more than two thousand people.

He is one of the members of 2V1G, short for "two vocals, one guitar". Executive Producer Pop Pop Music released the trio's first self-titled album in 2008, making it Malaysia's first Chinese Pop audiophile album, selling over 20,000 copies worldwide. Taiwan's Hi-Fi magazine AudioArt Taiwan named the debut album one of the "Top 100 Chinese Albums" while Hong Kong's Hi-Fi magazine Audiophile called it the "CD Bible".

He performed as the Roger Wang Trio, with Peter Lau (Percussion) and Simon Lau (Bass), at the Penang Island Jazz Festival in 2010 .

Wang won the Top 10 Original Songs (International) award at the 2011 Malaysian Entertainment Journalists Association Music Award for his original composition Love Scale. Love Scale was selected by Cantopop superstar Jacky Cheung as the second single for his Private Corner album (2010). Roger played the guitar for the song in the album.

Wang is the guitarist for Pop Pop's compilation album. Bloom: Volume 1. He also recorded an album, No Strings Attached, with fellow guitarist Farid Ali in 2006.

In 2013 Wang performed at the Cultural Center of the Philippines Jazz Festival in Manila, Philippines.

One year later, Wang was appointed the president of SPArKS the Society of Performing Arts Kota Kinabalu.

Shortly after that, he went to China where he performed at music festivals in various cities, including Hong Kong, Beijing, Shunde and Zhu Hai.
