= Jacksonville Symphony Youth Orchestra =

Youth orchestra in Jacksonville, Florida

Jacksonville Symphony Youth Orchestras
- Youth orchestra
- Founded: 1993
- Location: Jacksonville, Florida
- Concert hall: Robert E. Jacoby Symphony Hall, Times-Union Center for the Performing Arts
- Principal conductor: Grant O’Brien
- Website: www.jaxsymphony.org/jsyo

The Jacksonville Symphony Youth Orchestras, or JSYO, is a youth orchestra based in Jacksonville, Florida.

== Overview ==
Founded in 1993 under the Jacksonville Symphony Association, the JSYO enrolls more than 400 young musicians between the ages of 7 and 22, who are admitted through competitive auditions. The JSYO has six levels of ensembles – two full symphonies and four levels of string ensembles – that vary by repertoire and technical advancement. Regional satellite sites now offer beginning to intermediate ensembles for students musicians in the early stages of their musical instruction.

- Jump Start Strings – 1st year beginning string students, conducted by David Hwanmin Song
- Foundations Strings – 2nd year beginning string students, conducted by Rose Francis and John Wieland
- Encore Strings – young string students, conducted by Helen Morin
- Premiere Strings – advancing string students, conducted by Helen Morin
- Repertory Orchestra – intermediate full symphony orchestra, conducted by Grant O’Brien
- Philharmonic – advanced full symphony orchestra, conducted by Grant O’Brien
- Chamber Music Program – available to qualified philharmonic and pepertory musicians
- Communities in Schools Program – available at select elementary schools, conducted by John Wieland And Patrice Evans

In 2025, the orchestra received a $15 million donation from an anonymous person, the largest in its history.

== Musical instruction ==
The JSYO offers the following opportunities:

- In-depth study of classical repertoire
- Direction by professional conductors: as of 2018, the current conductor is Deanna Tham.
- Exposure to nationally recognized soloists through their affiliation with the Jacksonville Symphony
- Coaching sessions with Jacksonville Symphony musicians
- Outreach performances in the community
- Chamber ensemble training and performances
- Young Artists Competition
- Performances in the Jacoby Symphony Hall

== Performances ==
Usually, a JSYO season consists of three main concerts and a chamber ensemble concert given by members of the Philharmonic Orchestra. The season culminates with a joint performance with the Jacksonville Symphony at the Major/Minor Concert, bringing teachers and students to the stage together for a side-by-side performance. Winners of the JSYO Young Artists Competition have the honor of soloing at this concert.
