= Junichi Hirokami =

Japanese conductor

Junichi Hirokami 広上 淳一
- Born: May 5, 1958 (age 68); Tokyo, Japan
- Genre: Classical
- Occupation: Conductor
- Instruments: Piano, viola
- Years active: 1984-present

Junichi Hirokami (広上 淳一, Hirokami Jun'ichi; born May 5, 1958) is a Japanese conductor.

== Biography ==
Born in Tokyo, Hirokami studied conducting, piano, musicology, and viola at the Tokyo College of Music. He won the first Kondrashin International Conducting Competition in Amsterdam in September 1984 at age 26. One of the judges of that competition, pianist Vladimir Ashkenazy, then engaged Hirokami to conduct the NHK Symphony Orchestra on a tour of Japan with Ashkenazy in May 1985.

From 1991-1996, he was Chief Conductor of the Norrköping Symphony Orchestra. He served as Chief Conductor of the Limburg Symphony Orchestra from 1998 to 2000. He has also been the Principal Guest Conductor of both the Japan Philharmonic Orchestra and the Royal Liverpool Philharmonic Orchestra.

Hirokami became the music director of the Columbus Symphony Orchestra on June 1, 2006, with an initial contract for 3 years. During the orchestra's 2008 financial crisis, Hirokami strongly supported the musicians during a protracted contract dispute, which caused strained relations between Hirokami and the orchestra's board and management. On November 13, 2008, in a letter to the orchestra's musicians, Hirokami announced that the board of the Columbus Symphony Orchestra had dismissed him from his post, effective immediately.

From 2008 to 2022, Hirokami was chief conductor of the Kyoto Symphony Orchestra. In May 2024, the Malaysian Philharmonic Orchestra (MPO) announced the appointment of Hirokami as its next music director, effective in January 2025, with an initial contract of three years. Hirokami had first guest-conducted the MPO in 2000, and had returned for further guest-conducting appearances with the MPO in 2019, 2023 and 2024.

Hirokami and his wife Yukari have a daughter, Kimiko. In 1973, pop singer Junko Sakurada's music inspired then 15-year-old Hirokami so that he started a fan club dedicated to her.

Cultural offices
| Preceded by Franz Welser-Möst | Chief Conductor, Norrköping Symphony Orchestra; 1991-1996 | Succeeded by Ole Kristian Ruud |
| Preceded by Shlomo Mintz | Chief Conductor, Limburg Symphony Orchestra; 1998-2000 | Succeeded by Ed Spanjaard |
| Preceded by Gunther Herbig (music advisor) | Music Director, Columbus Symphony Orchestra; 2006-2008 | Succeeded by Jean-Marie Zeitouni |
| Preceded by Naoto Otomo | Chief Conductor, Kyoto Symphony Orchestra; 2008-2022 | Succeeded by Nodoka Okisawa |
| Preceded by Jun Märkl | Music Director, Malaysian Philharmonic Orchestra; 2025–present | Succeeded by incumbent |
