= Malaysian Philharmonic Orchestra =

Malaysian orchestra based in Kuala Lumpur

Malaysian Philharmonic
- Orchestra
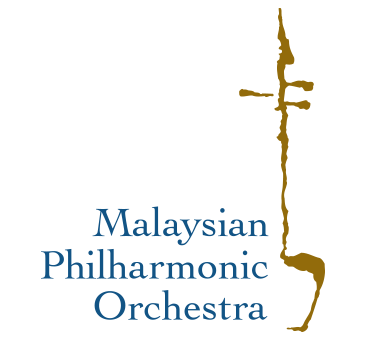
- Native name: Orkestra Filharmonik Malaysia
- Founded: 1997
- Location: Kuala Lumpur, Malaysia
- Concert hall: Petronas Philharmonic Hall
- Principal conductor: Junichi Hirokami
- Website: MPO official website

The Malaysian Philharmonic Orchestra (MPO; Malay: Orkestra Filharmonik Malaysia) is a Malaysian orchestra based in Kuala Lumpur. The orchestra is resident at the Petronas Philharmonic Hall (Dewan Filharmonik Petronas). It is one of Asia's leading orchestras and is praised for its musical qualities.

The patron of the MPO is Siti Hasmah, wife of the former Prime Minister of Malaysia, Mahathir Mohamad, who was the prime minister when the orchestra was founded in 1997. The orchestra is funded primarily through Petronas, a Malaysian oil and gas company.

== Background ==
Founded in 1997, the MPO made its debut concert on 17 August 1998 under the direction of its first music director and founder, Kees Bakels. In July 2003, Bakels announced his intention to stand down as music director for health reasons. In September 2003, the MPO appointed James Judd to succeed Bakels, effective with the 2004–2005 season. However, on 14 June 2004, the MPO issued a press announcement that "all contractual relationships between MPO and Mr. Judd have ceased with effect from 7 April 2004", without a formal explanation, with the result that Judd never took up the MPO post. Bakels subsequently remained as MPO music director through the end of the 2004–2005 season. Bakels subsequently took the title of conductor laureate of the MPO.

In November 2004, Matthias Bamert was named the MPO's principal conductor, starting from August 2005. Bamert held the post until the end of the 2007–2008 season. Claus Peter Flor was the MPO's music director, starting from August 2008, with an initial contract of 3 years. Flor continued as music director until the end of the 2013–2014 season. Fabio Mechetti then served as MPO principal conductor for the 2014–2015 season, and stood down from the post in October 2015.

Dato' Seri Ooi Chean See was the founding Resident Conductor of the Malaysian Philharmonic Orchestra from 1998 until 2006. The position remained vacant until Ciarán McAuley held the position from 2014 to 2016. Naohisa Furusawa, a member of the MPO double bass section since January 2003, was named Resident Conductor in 2016. Gerard Salonga was appointed as an additional Resident Conductor in 2018.

In 2018, Jun Märkl first guest-conducted the MPO. He returned for further guest-conducting engagements twice in 2019, and in March 2020. In December 2020, the MPO announced the appointment of Märkl as its next music director, effective with the 2021 season. Märkl stood down from the MPO after one year. In May 2024, the MPO announced the appointment of Junichi Hirokami as its next music director, effective in January 2025, with an initial contract of three years.

== Recordings ==
To date, the MPO has made 17 recordings under 3 labels.

Released date	Composer: Album title	Conductor, performer	Label, Catalog #
Jan 2001	Jean Sibelius, Aram Khachaturian: Violin Concertos	Kees Bakels, Aaron Rosand	Vox Classics, Cat #: 7904
Feb 2002	Alexander Glazunov: Violin Concerto, Meditation, Etc.	Kees Bakels, Aaron Rosand	Vox Classics, Cat #: 7907
Aug 2002	Antonín Dvořák: Music for cello and orchestra	Kees Bakels, Torleif Thedéen	BIS, Cat #: BIS-1276 CD
Jan 2003	Giuseppe Martucci: Symphony No. 1 Op. 75 & Symphony No. 2 Op. 81	Kees Bakels	BIS, Cat #: BIS-1255 CD
Aug 2003	Nikolai Rimsky-Korsakov: Scheherazade Op. 35	Kees Bakels	BIS, Cat #: BIS-1377 CD
Sep 2004	Nikolai Rimsky-Korsakov: Capriccio Espagnol Op. 34	Kees Bakels, Noriko Ogawa	BIS, Cat #: BIS-1387 CD
Apr 2005	Nikolai Rimsky-Korsakov: Symphony No. 1 & Symphony No. 3 Op. 32	Kees Bakels	BIS, Cat #: BIS-1477 CD
Feb 2006	Édouard Lalo: Orchestral Works	Kees Bakels, Torleif Thedéen	BIS, Cat #: BIS-1296 CD
Apr 2006	Nikolai Rimsky-Korsakov: The Snow Maiden	Kees Bakels	BIS, Cat #: BIS-1577 CD
Jul 2007	Nikolai Rimsky-Korsakov: Orchestral Works	Kees Bakels, Noriko Ogawa	BIS, Cat #: BIS-1667 CD
Jun 2009	Josef Suk: Asrael Symphony	Claus Peter Flor	BIS, Cat #: BIS-1776 SACD
Dec 2010	Bedrich Smetana: Má vlast	Claus Peter Flor	BIS, Cat #: BIS-1805 SACD
Aug 2011	Vasily Kalinnikov: The Two Symphonies	Kees Bakels	BIS, Cat #: BIS-1155 CD
Mar 2012	Antonín Dvořák: Symphony No.7	Claus Peter Flor	BIS, Cat #: BIS-1896 SACD
Jul 2012	Antonín Dvořák: Symphony No.8	Claus Peter Flor	BIS, Cat #: BIS-1976 SACD
Oct 2012	Antonín Dvořák: Symphony No.9	Claus Peter Flor	BIS, Cat #: BIS-1856 SACD
Sep 2017	Carl Davis: Aladdin: The ballet	Carl Davis	Carl Davis Collection, Cat #: 29

== Controversies ==
During Flor's music directorship, nine musicians on fixed-term contracts which expired on 15 August 2012 had been dismissed from the orchestra. The case led to calls to boycott auditions for the orchestra. On 15 February 2012, the MPO sent notices to the nine musicians to officially notify that their contracts will not be renewed. Seven out of the nine musicians who received the non-renewal notices filed a legal suit against the MPO at the Malaysian Industrial Court, challenging their former employer's decision not to extend their contracts. The musicians were Toko Inomoto (violist), Brian C. Larson (violinist), Paul Andrew Philbert (timpanist), Darcey Layne Timmerman (percussionist), Kevin Hugh Thompson (trombonist), Markus Gundermann (violinist) and Liu Jian (violinist).

In 2015, Malaysian Industrial Court threw out their dismissal suit, citing that the musicians’ fixed term contracts had naturally expired, and therefore, the MPO had not even needed to dismiss them. The court opined that the case is not considered 'sacking' or 'dismissal' but merely not extending the expired contract, which is common in many industries.

In a separate case, in May 2014, the Malaysian Industrial Court had ordered the MPO to pay a fine of US$147,000 for the dismissal of its former General Manager, Kim Sargeant in 2006 This decision was reversed in 2016.

== Music directors and principal conductors ==
- Kees Bakels (1998–2005, music director)
- Matthias Bamert (2005–2008, principal conductor)
- Claus Peter Flor (2008–2014, music director)
- Fabio Mechetti (2014–2015, principal conductor)
- Jun Märkl (2021–2022, music director)
- Junichi Hirokami (2025–present, music director)

== Resident conductors ==
- Ooi Chean See (1998–2006)
- Ciarán McAuley (2014–2016)
- Naohisa Furusawa (2016–2023)
- Gerard Salonga (2018–present)

== See also ==
- Malaysian Philharmonic Youth Orchestra
