= Jacksonville Symphony =

Non-profit organization in the USA

- Orchestra
- Founded: 1949
- Concert hall: Robert E. Jacoby Symphony Hall, Times-Union Center for the Performing Arts
- Principal conductor: Courtney Lewis
- Website: www.jaxsymphony.org

The Jacksonville Symphony is an American orchestra based in Jacksonville, Florida. The orchestra is resident at the Robert E. Jacoby Symphony Hall at the Jacksonville Center for the Performing Arts.

== History ==
The Jacksonville Symphony Association was founded in September 1949. The Jacksonville Symphony Orchestra gave its first concert on 8 March 1950 at the George Washington Hotel, under the direction of Van Lier Lanning. Lanning was the orchestra's first music director, from 1950 to 1951.

The Jacksonville Symphony has performed twice at Carnegie Hall, with its first Carnegie Hall concert in May 1972 under Willis Page, the orchestra's fifth music director, from 1971 to 1983. The orchestra's second Carnegie Hall concert appearance was in January 1998, during the tenure of Roger Nierenberg, Page's successor as music director (from 1984 to 1998).

The orchestra's current music director is Courtney Lewis, since 2015. The orchestra has extended Lewis' contract as its music director several times, first in August 2020 through the 2023–2024 season, subsequently in October 2022 through June 2027 and most recently in December 2025 through the 2031–2032 season.

The orchestra has been featured on radio relays on WJCT Public Radio, and on National Public Radio's Performance Today programme. The orchestra also gives educational ensemble performances in regional schools, including Spring Park Elementary, and has a Jump Start Strings educational programme directed towards children.

The Jacksonville Symphony Youth Orchestra and the Jacksonville Symphony Chorus are affiliated with the Jacksonville Symphony. Nathaniel Efthimiou is the current music director of the Jacksonville Symphony Youth Orchestra, and the current associate conductor of the Jacksonville Symphony. Na'Zir McFadden is the current assistant conductor of the Jacksonville Symphony. Dr.Tony Thornton is the current director of the Jacksonville Symphony Chorus.

== Music directors ==
- Van Lier Lanning (1950–1951)
- James Christian Pfohl (1952–1962)
- John Canarina (1962–1969)
- Daniell Revenaugh (1969–1970)
- Willis Page (1971–1983)
- Roger Nierenberg (1984–1998)
- Fabio Mechetti (1999–2014)
- Courtney Lewis (2015–present)

== Recordings ==
- 2006: Carl Orff – Carmina Burana

== See also ==
- Jacksonville Symphony Youth Orchestra
- List of symphony orchestras
