= Discovery Ensemble =

Defunct Boston-based orchestra

Discovery Ensemble (DE)
- Chamber orchestra
- Founded: 2008
- Location: Boston, Massachusetts
- Concert hall: Sanders Theatre, Cambridge, Massachusetts; Jordan Hall, Boston
- Principal conductor: Courtney Lewis

Discovery Ensemble was a Boston-based chamber orchestra founded by music director Courtney Lewis and Artistic Director David St. George. The orchestra, made up of young professionals from the Boston area, gave its inaugural concert in October 2008. It disappeared from the Boston music scene after an announcement cancelling the already advertised 2014 season.

Discovery Ensemble had two missions. It was a chamber orchestra that performed to local acclaim in the Boston Globe and the Boston Phoenix. Concerts took place at Sanders Theatre in Cambridge, Massachusetts.

Discovery Ensemble's second mission was education. The orchestra presented four Discovery Programs per year, each consisting of two in-school workshops and a matinee concert for children from local schools. The schools' concerts took place at Strand Theatre in Dorchester, Massachusetts.

Discovery Ensemble played live regularly on WGBH Radio and was featured as Critics' Choice on NPR. In December 2009, Pulitzer Prize–winning critic Lloyd Schwartz of the Boston Phoenix named Discovery Ensemble Boston's "Best Kept Secret".

== History ==
The orchestra played its first concert in October 2008 in the Strand Theatre, Dorchester with Ginastera's Variaciones concertantes, Stravinsky's Danses concertantes, and Beethoven's Fifth Symphony.

The orchestra was founded because directors Courtney Lewis and David St. George saw the possibility, given the abundance of young professional musicians in Boston, of forming and training a large (40 players) chamber orchestra that could perform at the highest international level.

Discovery Ensemble was particularly associated with schools and community centers in Dorchester.

== Reviews ==
- Boston Globe 1 Ensemble Shows Exuberance from the Start
- Boston Globe 2 Courtney Lewis and Discovery Ensemble Help Make Classical Accessible
- Boston Phoenix 1 Anniversaries and Other Occasions
- Boston Phoenix 2 Springer vs. Nero
- Boston Phoenix 3 The Roar of the Crowd
- Boston Phoenix 4 2009: The Year in Classical
- Boston Intelligencer Harbison "Bout of Un-relatedness" Between Two Chestnuts
- Dorchester Reporter Orchestra Helps Young People Discover Classical Music
- WBUR A Young Maestro’s Noble Experiment: Classical Music For All
- WBUR A Young Conductor Leads A Noble Experiment
