= Konzerthausorchester Berlin =

Symphony orchestra based in Berlin, Germany

The Konzerthausorchester Berlin is a German symphony orchestra based in Berlin. The orchestra is resident at the Konzerthaus Berlin, designed by the architect Karl Friedrich Schinkel. The building was destroyed during World War II, and was rebuilt from 1979 to 1984.

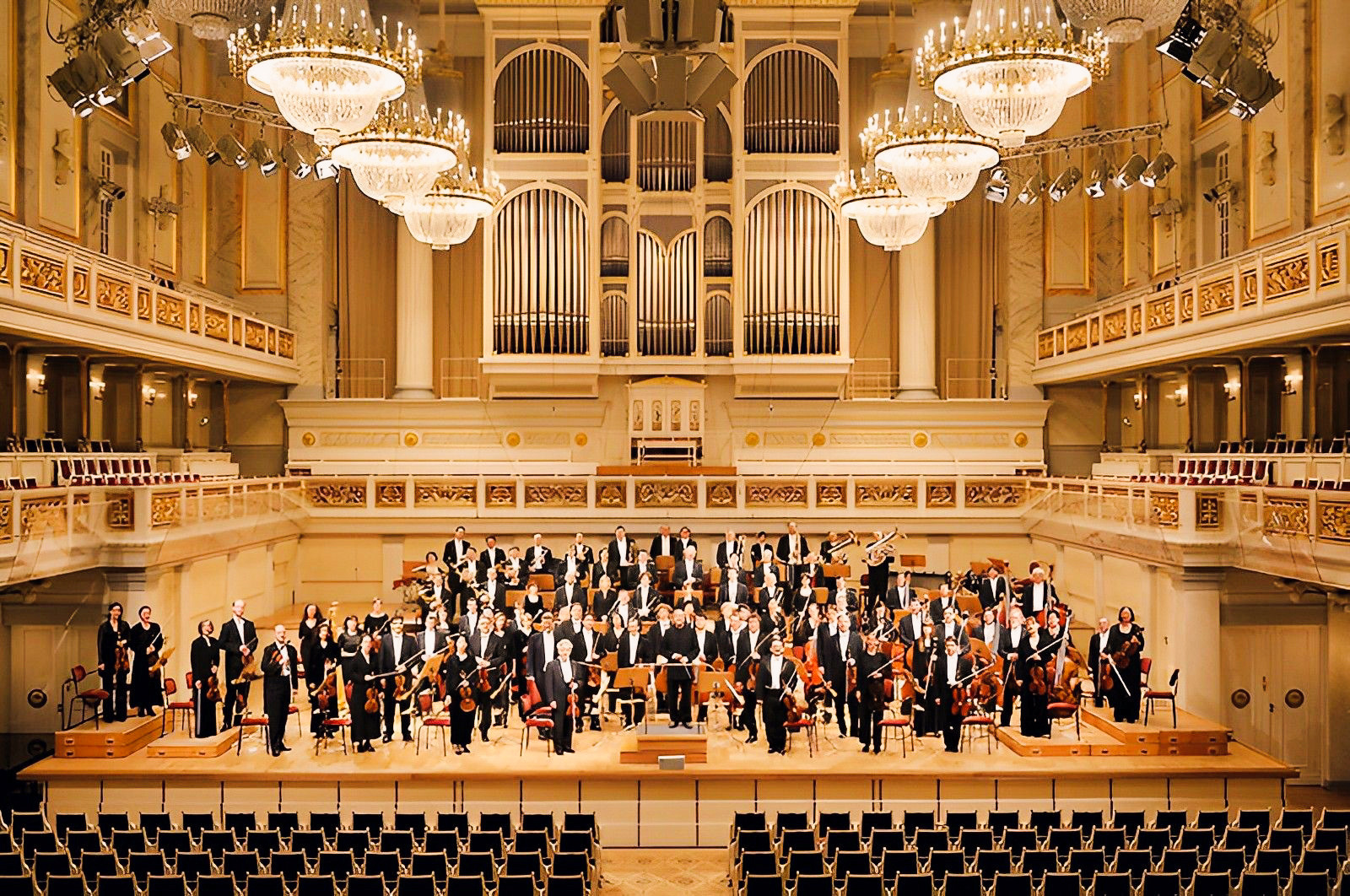
The orchestra in 2008

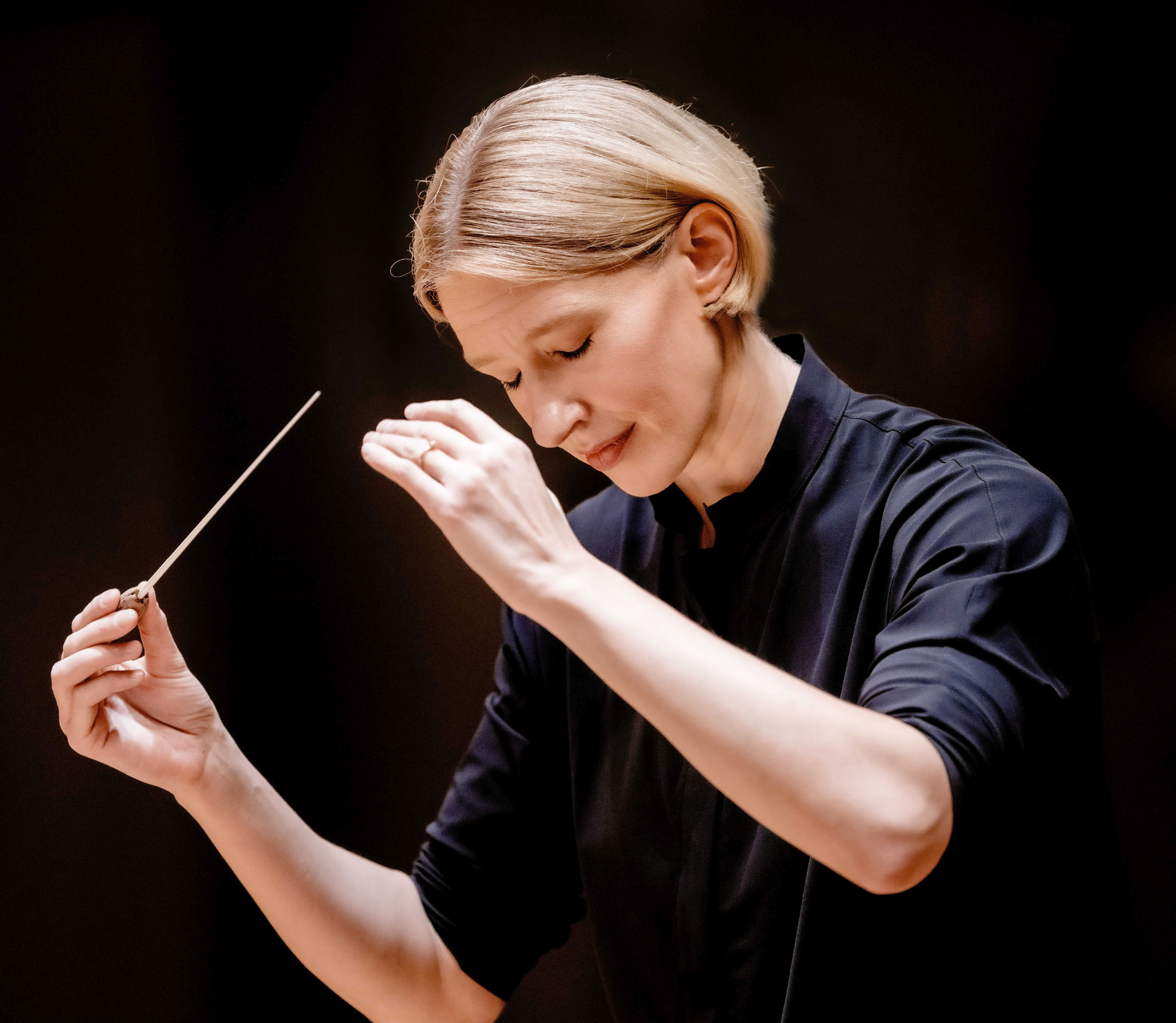
Principal conductor Joana Mallwitz

== History ==
The orchestra was founded in 1952 as the Berliner Sinfonie-Orchester (Berlin Symphony Orchestra) in what was then East Berlin, as a rival ensemble to the Berlin Philharmonic Orchestra based in West Berlin. The first chief conductor was Hermann Hildebrandt. In 1974, the Berlin Sinfonietta was founded to serve as the sister chamber orchestra of the Berliner Sinfonie-Orchester. During its East German years it was recorded by the state classical recording company Eterna Records. After German reunification in 1989, the orchestra was threatened with dissolution, but subscriber action maintained the ensemble. The orchestra acquired its current name in 2006. (This orchestra is separate from the West-Berlin based Berliner Symphoniker, founded in 1967.) The Konzerthausorchester Berlin currently has, as its sister chamber orchestra, the Konzerthaus Kammerorchester.

Kurt Sanderling was the longest-serving chief conductor of the orchestra, from 1960 to 1977. Subsequent chief conductors have been Günther Herbig, Claus Peter Flor, Michael Schønwandt (1992–1998), Eliahu Inbal (2001–2006), Lothar Zagrosek, and Iván Fischer. In November 2017, the orchestra announced the appointment of Christoph Eschenbach as its next chief conductor, effective with the 2019–2020 season, with an initial contract of 3 years. In July 2021, the orchestra announced the extension of Eschenbach's contract through the 2022–2023 season. He stood down as chief conductor at the close of the 2022–2023 season.

Principal guest conductors of the orchestra have included Dmitri Kitayenko. With the 2017–2018 season, Juraj Valčuha became principal guest conductor of the orchestra, following his initial guest-conducting appearance with the orchestra in the 2014–2015 season, and his subsequent return guest-conducting engagement 2 years later.

Joana Mallwitz first guest-conducted the orchestra during the 2020–2021 season. In August 2021, the orchestra announced the appointment of Mallwitz as its next chief conductor and artistic director, effective with the 2023–2024 season, with an initial contract of five seasons. Mallwitz is the first female conductor to be named chief conductor of the Konzerthausorchester Berlin. In July 2026, the Konzerthausorchester Berlin announced the extension of her contract as chief conductor and artistic director through the 2032–2033 season. Mallwitz and the Konzerthausorchester Berlin have recorded commercially for Deutsche Grammophon.

Past Intendanten (managing directors) of the orchestra have included Sebastian Nordmann, who concluded his tenure in the post in the summer of 2025. In May 2024, the orchestra announced the appointment of Tobias Rempe as its next Intendant, effective in 2025.

== Principal conductors ==
- Hermann Hildebrandt (1952–1959)
- Václav Smetáček (1959–1960)
- Kurt Sanderling (1960–1977)
- Günther Herbig (1977–1983)
- Claus Peter Flor (1984–1991)
- Michael Schønwandt (1992–1998)
- Eliahu Inbal (2001–2006)
- Lothar Zagrosek (2006–2011)
- Iván Fischer (2012–2018)
- Christoph Eschenbach (2019–2023)
- Joana Mallwitz (2023–present)
