= Sebastian Weigle =

German horn player and conductor

Sebastian Weigle (born 1961, in East Berlin) is a German conductor and horn player. He is currently principal conductor of the Yomiuri Nippon Symphony Orchestra.

== Biography ==
Weigle is a nephew of the conductor and music educator Jörg-Peter Weigle and the brother of the late violist Friedemann Weigle of the Artemis Quartet. Weigle studied at the Hochschule für Musik "Hanns Eisler" in horn, piano and conducting. In 1987 he founded the Berlin Chamber Choir, and later he led the New Berlin Chamber Orchestra. He was principal horn player in the orchestra of the Berlin State Opera for 15 years. He also was a member of the jazz orchestra "Vielharmonie" in East Berlin.

In 1993, Weigle became chief conductor of the Junge Philharmonie Brandenburg. In 1997, he became Erster Staatskapellmeister of the Staatsoper Unter den Linden. In 2003, Weigle was named "Conductor of the Year" by the German magazine Opernwelt, and subsequently won this award in 2005 and 2006. From 2004 to 2008, he was music director of the Gran Teatre del Liceu in Barcelona.

Weigle conducted a new production of Wagner's Die Meistersinger von Nürnberg at the Bayreuth Festival in 2007, staged by Katharina Wagner, as well as repeated performances in the following years.

From 2008 to 2023, Weigle was Generalmusikdirektor (General Music Director) of the Oper Frankfurt. He conducted new productions of Daphne and Arabella by Richard Strauss, Korngold's Die tote Stadt, Reimann's Lear and Die Fledermaus by Johann Strauß, and he took over Mozart's Die Zauberflöte, Beethovens Fidelio, and Wagner's Tristan und Isolde and Parsifal. He conducted Wagner's Der Ring des Nibelungen, staged by Vera Nemirova, with two complete cycles in 2012. Single performances were recorded. With Oper Frankfurt, Weigle has made commercial recordings of opera for the OEHMS Classics label.

Outside of Europe, Weigle became principal conductor of the Yomiuri Nippon Symphony Orchestra on 1 April 2019, with an initial contract of three years.

Cultural offices
Preceded by Bertrand de Billy	Music Director, Gran Teatre del Liceu; 2004–2008	Succeeded by Michael Boder
Preceded by Paolo Carignani	General Music Director, Frankfurt Opera; 2008–2023	Succeeded by Thomas Guggeis
Preceded by Sylvain Cambreling	Principal Conductor, Yomiuri Nippon Symphony Orchestra; 2019–present	Succeeded by incumbent
