= Kurt Sanderling =

German conductor (1912–2011)

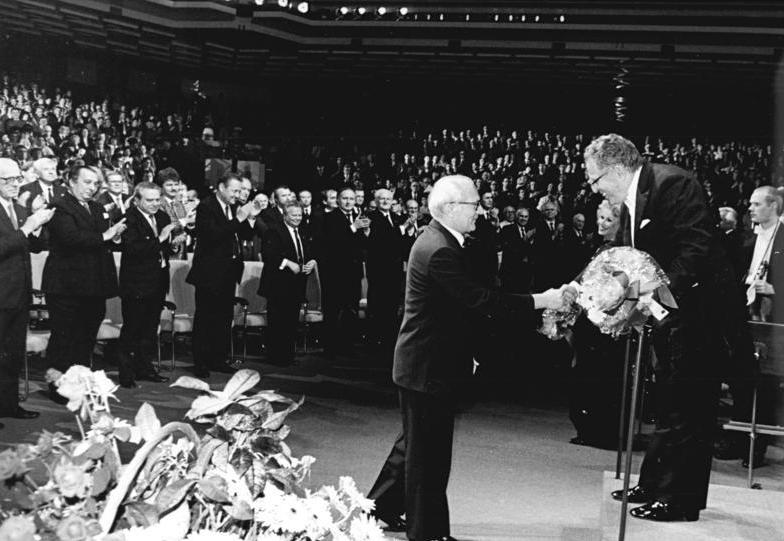
Sanderling (on podium) greeted by Erich Honecker during a concert celebrating the 750th anniversary of the city of Berlin in 1987

Kurt Sanderling, CBE (Russian: Курт Игнатьевич Зандерлинг, romanized: Kurt Ignatyevich Zanderling; 19 September 1912 – 18 September 2011) was a German conductor.

== Early life and career ==
Sanderling was born in Arys, Kingdom of Prussia, German Empire (now Orzysz, Poland) to Jewish parents. His early work at the Deutsche Oper Berlin, where he served as repetiteur (rehearsal director) for Wilhelm Furtwängler and Erich Kleiber, was cut short when the Nazi regime removed him from his post because he was Jewish.

He then left for the Soviet Union in 1936, where he worked with the Moscow Radio Symphony Orchestra. In 1939, he became conductor of the Kharkiv Philharmonic Orchestra. During the siege of Leningrad, he worked in Novosibirsk. From 1942 to 1960, he was joint principal conductor with Yevgeny Mravinsky of the Leningrad Philharmonic. Around 1942–1943, Sanderling first met Dmitri Shostakovich, which marked the start of their professional working relationship and personal friendship.

== Post-1960 ==
In 1960, Sanderling returned to East Germany to take up the chief conductorship of the Berlin Symphony Orchestra, where he remained until 1977. From 1964 to 1967, he was chief conductor of the Dresden Staatskapelle. He made his British debut in 1970. His first guest-conducting appearance with the Philharmonia Orchestra was in 1972, as a substitute for Otto Klemperer. Their working relationship further developed after a January 1980 series of performances of the complete Beethoven symphonies at Wembley, and a subsequent commercial recording of the Beethoven symphonies for EMI. The Philharmonia appointed Sanderling its Conductor Emeritus in 1996. He was also Emeritus Conductor of the Madrid Symphony Orchestra. In the US, he worked with particular frequency as a guest conductor with the Los Angeles Philharmonic.

Sanderling announced his retirement from conducting in May 2002. In September 2002, Sanderling was appointed a Commander of the Order of the British Empire (CBE) and awarded the Ernst Reuter Plaque of Berlin, the city's highest honour. In addition to his Philharmonia Beethoven symphony cycle, his commercial recordings include the Beethoven piano concertos with pianist Mitsuko Uchida, Nos. 3, 4 with the Royal Concertgebouw Orchestra and Nos. 1, 2 and 5 with the Bavarian Radio Symphony Orchestra. He was among the first conductors to perform and record Deryck Cooke's completion of Gustav Mahler's Symphony No. 10, which his friend Berthold Goldschmidt had premiered.

Sanderling died on 18 September 2011, one day before his 99th birthday in Berlin.

== Personal life ==
He was married twice. His first marriage to Nina Bobath was in 1941, and produced a son, Thomas Sanderling, who became a conductor. This ended in divorce after his return to East Germany. His second wife was the former Barbara Wagner, a double bassist in the Berlin Symphony Orchestra. They married in 1963, and their marriage produced two sons, the conductors Stefan Sanderling and Michael Sanderling.

== Publications ==
- 2002: Kurt Sanderling and Ulrich Roloff-Momin: Andere machen Geschichte, ich machte Musik. Parthas, Berlin 2002, 431 pp., ill., discographie, ISBN 3-932529-35-9, (Biography; in German)

=== Film ===
- Seine Liebe zu Brahms. Kurt Sanderling unterrichtet die 4. Sinfonie. (with the Radio-Sinfonieorchester Stuttgart of the SWR) Documentation, 60 Min., a film by Norbert Beilharz, First transmission: 2. November 2003. OCLC 916256911

Preceded by Hermann Hildebrandt	Principal Conductor, Konzerthausorchester Berlin; 1960–1977	Succeeded by Günther Herbig
