= Jun Märkl =

German conductor (born 1959)

Jun Märkl (born 11 February 1959 in Munich) is a German conductor. He is music director of the Indianapolis Symphony Orchestra.

== Biography ==
One of three children born to a Japanese pianist mother and a German violinist father, Märkl studied piano and the violin as a youth. Beginning in 1978 at the Musikhochschule Hannover he continued his piano and violin studies and also began to study conducting. He later attended the University of Michigan where his mentors included Gustav Meier. He was also a pupil of Sergiu Celibidache. He later won a conducting stipend to Tanglewood, where he was under the tutelage of Leonard Bernstein and Seiji Ozawa.

From 1991 to 1994, Märkl served as music director of the Saarländisches Staatstheater in Saarbrücken. From 1994 to 2000, he was Generalmusikdirektor and director of opera at the Mannheim National Theatre. In the U.S. he made his Metropolitan Opera conducting debut in February 1999 with Il trovatore, and returned in December 2000 with Turandot.

In 2005, Märkl became music director of the Orchestre National de Lyon (ONL). With the ONL, he conducted several recordings for the Naxos label, including music of Claude Debussy, Maurice Ravel, and Olivier Messiaen. Märkl concluded his ONL tenure in 2011. In September 2007, he became principal conductor of the MDR Symphony Orchestra in Leipzig. Märkl resigned from this post after the 2011–2012 season.

Märkl became musical advisor to the Basque National Orchestra (Orquesta de Euskadi) effective with the 2014–2015 season. In November 2014, the orchestra elevated Märkl's title to chief conductor with immediate effect, through the 2015–2016 season. He concluded his tenure with the Basque National Orchestra in June 2017. In May 2019, the Residentie Orchestra announced the appointment of Märkl as its co-principal guest conductor, effective in 2021. In December 2023, the Residentie Orchestra announced the appointment of Märkl as its next chief conductor, effective with the 2025–2026 season, with an initial contract of four years.

Outside of Europe, in October 2020, the National Symphony Orchestra (Taiwan) announced the appointment of Märkl as an artistic advisor for the period of 2021–2022, and subsequently as its next music director, effective 1 January 2022. In December 2020, the Malaysian Philharmonic Orchestra (MPO) announced the appointment of Märkl as its next music director, effective with the 2021 season. Märkl stood down from the MPO after one year. In May 2021, the Indianapolis Symphony Orchestra announced the appointment of Märkl as its artistic advisor for the 2021–2022 season. In January 2024, the Indianapolis Symphony Orchestra announced the elevation of Märkl's title to music director-designate with immediate effect, and his appointment as the orchestra's next music director, effective with the 2024–2025 season, with an initial contract of 5 years.

Märkl and his wife Susanne have four children.

Cultural offices
Preceded by Jiří Kout	Generalmusikdirektor, Saarländisches Staatstheater; 1991–1994	Succeeded by Laurent Wagner
Preceded by Miguel Ángel Gómez Martínez	Generalmusikdirektor, Mannheim National Theatre; 1994–2000	Succeeded by Ádám Fischer
Preceded by David Robertson	Music Director, Orchestre National de Lyon; 2005–2011	Succeeded by Leonard Slatkin
Preceded by Fabio Luisi	Chief Conductor, MDR Sinfonieorchester; 2007–2012	Succeeded by Kristjan Järvi
Preceded by Andrés Orozco-Estrada	Principal Conductor, Euskadiko Orkestra; 2014–2017	Succeeded by Robert Treviño
Preceded by Fabio Mechetti (principal conductor)	Music Director, Malaysian Philharmonic Orchestra; 2021–2022	Succeeded by Junichi Hirokami
Preceded by Lu Shao-chia	Music Director, National Symphony Orchestra of Taiwan; 2022–present	Succeeded by incumbent
Preceded by Krzysztof Urbański	Music Director, Indianapolis Symphony Orchestra; 2024–present	Succeeded by incumbent
Preceded by Anja Bihlmaier	Chief Conductor, Residentie Orchestra; 2025–present	Succeeded by incumbent
