= Berlin Sinfonietta =

The Berlin Sinfonietta, founded in 1974, is the chamber orchestra of the "Berlin Symphony Orchestra" (now known as the "Konzerthausorchester Berlin").

The founder of the orchestra, Hans Peter Franck, was for many years the second conductor of the Berlin Symphony Orchestra. Since 2009, the director has been Sebastian Nordmann. The orchestra plays regularly in the concert halls in Berlin, such as the Philharmonie and the Konzerthaus Berlin. It plays not just the standard repertoire, but includes contemporary music and 20th-century music.

== Repertoire ==
Along with renaming the chamber orchestra in 1987 to “Berlin Sinfonietta" the orchestra expanded its repertoire and its capacity to a symphony orchestra and started to cooperate with big choir and other musical institutes. Then followed numerous concerts and recordings of works including Mozart's Requiem, Brahms' Requiem, Haydn's The Creation and The Seasons, Handel's Messiah, Bach's B Minor Mass, Dvorak's Stabat Mater, Rossini's Stabat Mater, Mendelssohn's Elijah and St. Paul, and Schubert Masses.
