= Willis Page =

Willis Page (born September 18, 1918, Rochester, N.Y., died January 9, 2013.), was a musician and symphony orchestra conductor. He conducted three major US orchestras – in Nashville, Tennessee, Des Moines, Iowa, and Jacksonville, Florida. He was also the associate conductor in Buffalo, New York, where he conducted three quarters of all concerts and has been guest conductor for several orchestras including the Boston Pops Orchestra (seven times), Denver, St Louis, Rochester, Hartford, Muncie, Yomiuri, Toronto and Jerusalem. He was the first US conductor of a major Japanese symphony orchestra, the Yomiuri Nippon Symphony Orchestra. He was the first conductor to hire black musicians in a classical orchestra in the USA.

== Early life ==
He attended the Eastman School of Music, where he graduated with distinction, having been awarded double Performance Degrees on the Double Bass and the Tuba. Willis was a protege of Pierre Monteux. In 1940, he was invited by Serge Koussevitsky to join the Boston Symphony Orchestra (BSO).

His musical career was interrupted in 1943 when he joined the US army; he worked as a German translator for the General of the 95th Infantry and was awarded the Bronze Star. Immediately after the war, his linguistic talents were turned to assisting the displaced people of Germany. In total, he had to deal with over 100,000 individuals.

In 1946, he was at the forefront of a campaign to raise aid in the US for the starving peoples of Eastern Europe. In three months his campaign raised over $25,000.

== Career ==
=== Boston ===
After the War, he returned to the BSO where he became Assistant Principal; he was also principal bass for Arthur Fiedler’s Boston Pops Orchestra. In 1952, he made his debut as a conductor, leading the Boston Pops in front of an audience of 20,000. In 1954, he conducted 65 members of the BSO in the first stereo recordings ever made (at the time referred to as binaural recordings) – eleven recordings in total, recorded for Cook Laboratories. At the start of 1955, he was appointed as Associate Conductor of the Buffalo Philharmonic Orchestra (under Josef Krips), with whom he had already made eleven appearances as guest conductor. In 1957, he taught Ortiz Walton, the first African American to be a member of a major American orchestra: Walton was bass player with the Boston Symphony Orchestra.

Willis Page & The Orchestral Society of Boston

Premiere stereo recording releases (1954)

- Stravinsky, Villa-Lobos & Bach
- Tchaikovsky: Romeo & Juliet
- Brahms First Symphony
- Haydn: Military Symphony
- Mozart: Symphony #40
- Beethoven: Fifth Symphony
- DuBois: Seven Last Words of Christ
- Tempo Vivace
- Modern Orchestral Textures

=== Nashville ===
After five years in Buffalo, Page moved to Nashville to take up the post of Music Director of the Nashville Symphony Orchestra. At the time, members of orchestras were engaged part-time and normally had a separate full-time career, often in teaching. One of Page’s first decisions at Nashville was to change that by employing sixteen full-time core musicians. He also took the radical decision that all musicians would be employed on the basis of musical skill, regardless of ethnicity, sex or religion: the NSO thereby became the first US orchestra whose membership was multi-racial. In 1962, he took fourteen months leave from the Nashville orchestra to become conductor of Tokyo’s Yomiuri Nippon Symphony Orchestra; he was the first US citizen to hold such a position. On arrival at Tokyo Airport, he was kidnapped and held captive for over half an hour. In 1965, he secured a grant of half a million dollars from the Ford Foundation, as part of a huge grant to support symphony orchestras in the USA. McNeil Lowry, then VP of the Ford Foundation wrote: "Mr. Page's application in 1961 on behalf of the Nashville Symphony had a profound impact on the FF's 1965 decision to grant 85 million dollars to the Symphony Orchestras of the United States.” In 1968, he became Professor of Conducting at Drake University in Des Moines.

=== Jacksonville ===
He was the conductor and musical director of the Jacksonville Symphony Orchestra from 1971 to 1983. After 30 years of making music, the Orchestra had officially ceased to be in 1970. Page was largely responsible for its revival, taking the newly reformed orchestra on tour to some of America’s major concert halls and commissioning a series of new pieces by major composers. He founded the St Johns River City Band of which he was also conductor in 1985. In 1989, following a brief return to Japan, he established, the First Coast Pops Orchestra which brought the Boston Pops approach to Florida via weekend concerts held at the Jacksonville Beach Flag Pavilion.

After retiring from working in music full-time, Willis Page continued to deliver talks and lectures in the art of conducting, to participate actively in local Christian organisations and to lead a number of a cappella church vocal groups.
