= Matthias Bamert =

Swiss conductor and composer (born 1942)

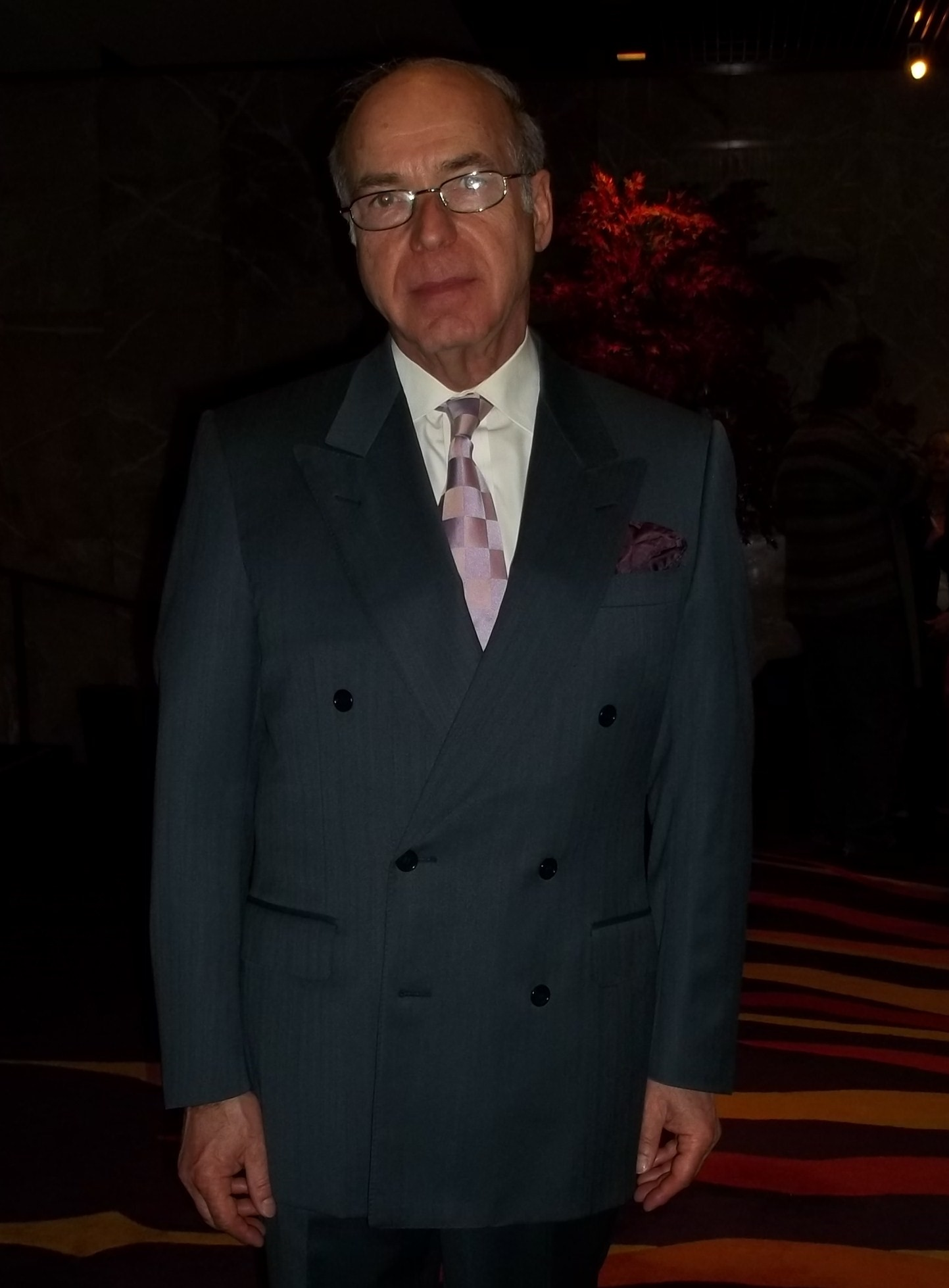
Bamert in 2011

Matthias Bamert (born July 5, 1942, in Ersigen, Canton of Bern) is a Swiss conductor and composer.

== Biography ==
In addition to studies in Switzerland, Bamert studied music in Darmstadt and in Paris, with Pierre Boulez and Karlheinz Stockhausen, and their influences can be detected in his own compositions from the 1970s. He spent the years 1965 to 1969 as principal oboist with the Salzburg Mozart Orchestra, but then switched to conducting.

Bamert's conducting career began in North America as an apprentice to George Szell and later as assistant conductor to Leopold Stokowski, and resident conductor of the Cleveland Orchestra under Lorin Maazel. He was music director of the Swiss Radio Orchestra from 1977 to 1983.

Bamert was principal guest conductor of the Royal Scottish National Orchestra and director of the Glasgow contemporary music festival Musica Nova from 1985 to 1990. He has conducted the world premieres of works by composers such as Toru Takemitsu, John Casken, James MacMillan and Wolfgang Rihm. He was director of the Lucerne Festival from 1992 to 1998. During his Lucerne tenure, a new concert hall was opened, and programme expansions included establishment of a new Easter Festival and a piano festival.

Bamert served as principal guest conductor of the New Zealand Symphony Orchestra (NZSO) from 2000 to 2005, chief conductor of the West Australian Symphony Orchestra (WASO) from 2003 to 2006. His initial contract with WASO was through 2007, but dissatisfaction with his tenure caused the orchestra to terminate his contract 18 months early, in May 2006. Bamert was named chief conductor of the Malaysian Philharmonic Orchestra in November 2004, and served in the post from 2005 to 2008. In October 2017, the Sapporo Symphony Orchestra announced the appointment of Bamert as its next chief conductor, effective with the 2018–2019 season, with an initial contract of three seasons. Sapporo Symphony Orchestra announced in February 2020 that they have extended Bamert's tenure through the 2023–2024 season.

Bamert has conducted over 60 recordings, including recordings with Chandos Records of music by Josef Mysliveček, Parry (the complete symphonies) and Frank Martin (5 discs) with the London Philharmonic Orchestra, the symphonies of Roberto Gerhard with the BBC Symphony Orchestra, Dutch composers such as Johannes Verhulst and Cornelis Dopper with the Residentie Orchestra, a series devoted to Leopold Stokowski arrangements, concert music by Korngold and Ernő Dohnányi with the BBC Philharmonic. He has also conducted a series of recordings of John Field's compositions for piano and orchestra with Míceál O'Rourke. Among his own compositions, Bamert's Mantrajana was recorded by the Louisville Orchestra by their own record label (the composer conducting) in 1974 (Louisville Orchestra LS 741).

Bamert has lived in London since 1987.

Cultural offices
| Preceded by Kees Bakels | Music Director, Malaysian Philharmonic Orchestra; 2005–2008 | Succeeded by Claus Peter Flor |
| Preceded by Max Pommer | Chief Conductor, Sapporo Symphony Orchestra; 2018–2024 | Succeeded by Elias Grandy |
