= Claus Peter Flor =

German conductor

Claus Peter Flor (born 16 March 1953, Leipzig) is a German conductor.

== Biography ==
Flor studied violin and clarinet at the Robert Schumann Conservatory in Zwickau. He continued his music studies at the Franz Liszt Academy of Music in Weimar and the HMT Felix Mendelssohn Bartholdy in Leipzig. He was later a conducting student with Rolf Reuter and with Kurt Masur. In 1979, he became the inaugural winner of the Grzegorz Fitelberg International Competition for Conductors in Katowice.

Flor was chief conductor of the Suhl Philharmonic Orchestra from 1981 to 1984. Flor served as chief conductor of the Konzerthausorchester Berlin from 1984 to 1991. He was artistic advisor and principal guest conductor to the Tonhalle Orchestra Zürich from 1991 to 1996. He was principal guest conductor of the Philharmonia Orchestra from 1991 to 1994, and became principal guest conductor of the Orchestra Sinfonica di Milano Giuseppe Verdi in 2003. In April 2017, Het Gelders Orkest announced that they had secured the services of Flor for an extended guest conductor relationship, without the formal conferring of a title such as 'principal guest conductor'. In June 2017, the Orchestra Sinfonica di Milano Giuseppe Verdi ('La Verdi') announced the appointment of Flor as its next music director, effective with the 2017–2018 season, with an initial contract of 3 years. Flor concluded his tenure with La Verdi in 2023.

Outside of Europe, Flor served as principal guest conductor with the Dallas Symphony Orchestra from 1999 to 2008. From 2008 to 2014, Flor was music director of the Malaysian Philharmonic Orchestra. During his tenure, he oversaw controversial sackings of nine key musicians of the orchestra, which culminated in a call by the International Federation of Musicians for an international boycott against auditions held by the orchestra.

Cultural offices
Preceded by Günther Herbig	Chief Conductor, Konzerthausorchester Berlin; 1984–1991	Succeeded by Michael Schønwandt
Preceded by Matthias Bamert	Music Director, Malaysian Philharmonic Orchestra; 2008–2014	Succeeded by Fabio Mechetti
Preceded by Xian Zhang	Music Director, Orchestra Sinfonica di Milano Giuseppe Verdi; 2017–2023	Succeeded by Emmanuel Tjeknavorian
