= Malaysian Philharmonic Youth Orchestra =

- Youth orchestra
- Founded: 2006
- Location: Kuala Lumpur, Malaysia
- Concert hall: Petronas Filharmonik Hall
- Website: mpo.com.my/about-mpyo

Malaysian Philharmonic Youth Orchestra (MPYO) is the national youth orchestra of Malaysia. The goal of this youth orchestra is to inspire young Malaysian musicians to appreciate orchestral music and to create a pool of well-trained musicians, particularly in classical music.

The first round of auditions were held on 6 May and 6 June 2006. About 500 young instrumentalists aged between 14 and 26 attended the auditions from all across Malaysia. 110 were selected into the newly formed youth orchestra in 2006.

The MPYO performs a wide-ranging of music genre, mainly classical music from the symphonic to commissioned works by Malaysian composers. Todate, it has a total of 106 musicians, participating in concerts, workshops and training throughout the year.

The MPYO made its debut concert at the Petronas Philharmonic Hall on 25 August 2007, led by its first principal conductor, Kevin Field.

== Conductors ==
- Kevin Field (2006–2014) Principal Conductor
- Ciarán McAuley (2014–2016) Resident Conductor
- Harish Shankar (2016–2017) Resident Conductor
- Naohisa Furusawa (2016–present) Resident Conductor
- Gerard Salonga (2018–present) Resident Conductor

== See also ==
- Malaysian Philharmonic Orchestra

== See also ==
- List of youth orchestras
