= Yomiuri Nippon Symphony Orchestra =

Symphony orchestra in Tokyo

- Orchestra
- Native name: 読売日本交響楽団 (Yomiuri Nippon Kōkyō Gakudan)
- Founded: 1962; 64 years ago
- Location: Tokyo, Japan
- Concert hall: Suntory Hall (primary)
- Principal conductor: Sebastian Weigle (2019–present)
- Website: Official website

The Yomiuri Nippon Symphony Orchestra (読売日本交響楽団, Yomiuri Nippon Kōkyō Gakudan) is a Japanese symphony orchestra administratively based in Tokyo. The orchestra primarily performs concerts in Tokyo at the Suntory Hall, but also gives concerts at the Tokyo Opera City Concert Hall and also performs in Yokohama at the Yokohama Minato Mirai Hall.

== History ==
The orchestra was founded in 1962 by the Yomiuri Shimbun newspaper group, the Nippon Television Network Corporation, and the Yomiuri Telecasting Corporation. Its first principal conductor was the American conductor Willis Page, who served while on leave from the Nashville Symphony Orchestra. Hiroshi Wakasugi became the orchestra's first Japanese principal conductor in 1965. Rafael Frühbeck de Burgos, the orchestra's fourth principal conductor from 1980 to 1983, held the title of principal guest conductor with the orchestra from 1983 to 1990, and was named one of the orchestra's honorary conductors in 1990. Other conductors with the title of honorary conductor include Kurt Masur, since 1979, and Gennady Rozhdestvensky, since 1990. Tadaaki Otaka, the orchestra's sixth principal conductor from 1992 to 1998, now has the title of honorary guest conductor.

Sylvain Cambreling was principal conductor from April 2010 through March 2019. Cambreling now has the title of conductor laureate with the orchestra. In August 2016, Sebastian Weigle first guest-conducted the orchestra. He returned for a further guest-conducting engagement in July 2017. In May 2018, the orchestra announced the appointment of Weigle as its next chief conductor, effective 1 April 2019, with an initial contract of three years.

In 1978, they recorded a new arrangement of the music of Hato no kyūjitsu for Nippon TV’s 25th anniversary.

== Principal conductors (partial list) ==
- Willis Page (1962–1963)
- Otto Matzerath (1963)
- Hiroshi Wakasugi (1965–1975)
- Rafael Frühbeck de Burgos (1980–1983)
- Heinz Rögner (1984–1990)
- Tadaaki Otaka (1992–1998)
- Gerd Albrecht (1998–2007)
- Stanisław Skrowaczewski (2007–2010)
- Sylvain Cambreling (2010–2019)
- Sebastian Weigle (2019–present)
