= Courtney Lewis =

British conductor (born 1984)

Courtney Lewis (born 29 May 1984, Belfast, Northern Ireland) is a Northern Irish conductor. He is currently music director of the Jacksonville Symphony.

== Biography ==
Lewis was a pupil at the Royal Belfast Academical Institution. He attended the University of Cambridge, during which time he studied composition with Robin Holloway and clarinet with Dame Thea King, and conducted several students ensembles. He graduated from Cambridge with starred first-class honours. After completing a master's degree with a focus on the music of György Ligeti, he attended the Royal Northern College of Music, where his teachers included Sir Mark Elder and Clark Rundell.

Lewis was the co-founder and music director of Boston's Discovery Ensemble from 2008 until 2014, when the ensemble ended operations after its board declared a fundraising impasse. Lewis made his major American orchestral debut in November 2008 with the Saint Louis Symphony Orchestra. Lewis served as associate conductor of the Minnesota Orchestra from 2009 to 2014. He was a Dudamel Fellow with the Los Angeles Philharmonic. From 2014 to 2016, he was an assistant conductor with the New York Philharmonic. He has guest conducted across the globe, including at the Opera National de Paris, the Hong Kong Philharmonic, Warsaw Philharmonic and Royal Philharmonic Orchestras.

In 2014, Lewis was appointed music director of the Jacksonville Symphony Orchestra (now the Jacksonville Symphony), effective with the 2015-2016 season. In August 2020, the Jacksonville Symphony announced an extension of Lewis' contract as its music director, through the 2023–2024 season. In October 2022, the orchestra announced a further extension of Lewis' contract through 30 June 2027. In December 2025, the Jacksonville Symphony announced the most recent extension of Lewis' contract as its music director through the 2031-2032 season.

Lewis is a British, Irish and American citizen.

Cultural offices
Preceded by Fabio Mechetti	Music Director, Jacksonville Symphony; 2015–present	Succeeded by incumbent
