= Kees Bakels =

Dutch conductor

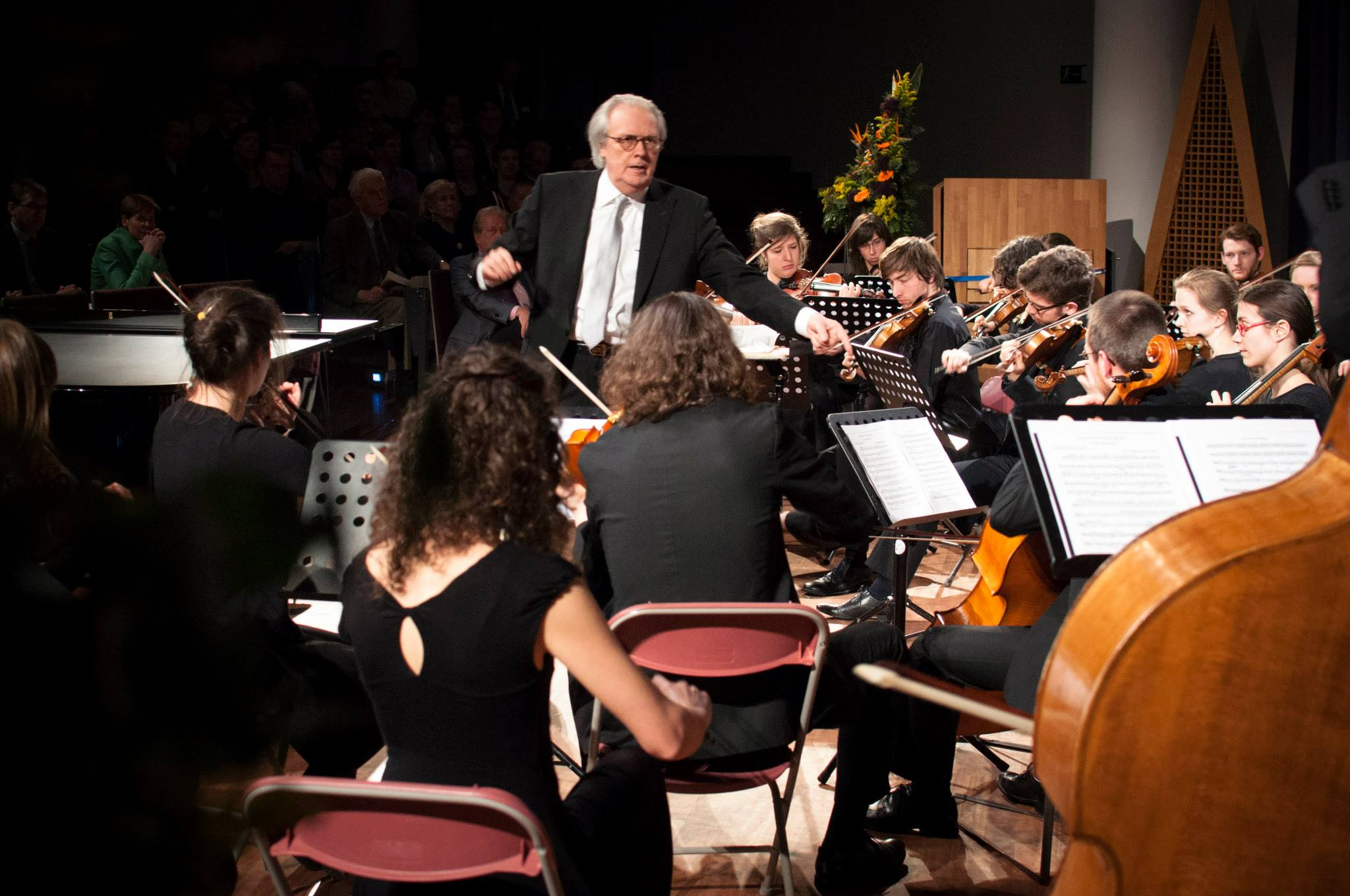
Kees Bakels in 2014

Kees Bakels (born 14 January 1945, in Amsterdam) is a Dutch conductor.

Bakels began his musical career as a violinist, and later studied conducting at the Amsterdam Conservatory and the Accademia Musicale Chigiana in Siena, Italy. He has appeared with many orchestras as a guest conductor, in addition to holding titled position with the Netherlands Chamber Orchestra and with the Netherlands Radio Symphony. He was principal guest conductor of the Bournemouth Symphony Orchestra for 10 years, and recorded symphonies of Ralph Vaughan Williams with the orchestra for the Naxos label. In 1994, Bakels was named Principal Guest Conductor of the Victoria Symphony (British Columbia, Canada) and served as the orchestra's Music Director from 1998-2002.

Bakels was the first music director of the Malaysian Philharmonic Orchestra, from 1997 to 2005. He now has the title of conductor laureate of the orchestra. Bakels initially had intended to step down from the MPO music directorship prior to 2005, after James Judd had been named the MPO's next music director in September 2003. However, in April 2004, the MPO terminated the agreement with Judd without public explanation, and Judd never took up the post of the MPO's music director. Bakels continued to hold the MPO music directorship until Matthias Bamert officially took up the post in 2005. With the orchestra, Bakels has recorded several CDs for BIS Records, including music of Nikolai Rimsky-Korsakov and of Edouard Lalo.

Cultural offices
Preceded by (no predecessor)	Music Director, Malaysian Philharmonic Orchestra; 1997–2005	Succeeded by Matthias Bamert
