= Petronas Philharmonic Hall =

Concert hall in Kuala Lumpur, Malaysia

- Dewan Filharmonik Petronas
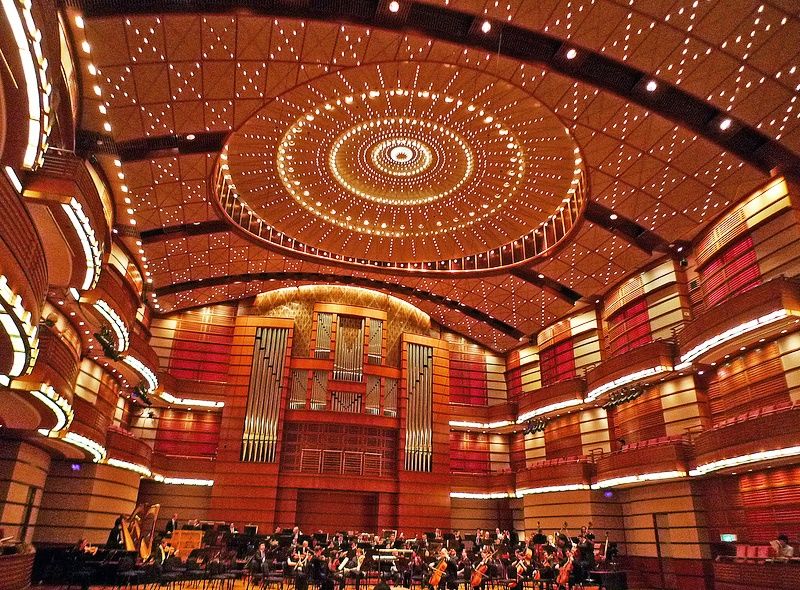
- Interior of the concert hall
- Interactive map of Petronas Philharmonic Hall
- Location: Petronas Twin Towers KLCC, Kuala Lumpur, Malaysia
- Coordinates: 3.1576°N 101.7121°E
- Owner: KLCC Property Holdings Berhad
- Seating type: hall seats, box seats, corporate suites and a royal suite
- Capacity: 920 seats
- Type: Concert Hall

Construction
- Built: 1 January 1996
- Opened: 17 August 1998
- Architects: Cesar Pelli & Associates (design); Adamson Associates (executive architect); Kirkegaard Associates (acoustics)

Website
- Official website

The Petronas Philharmonic Hall (Malay: Dewan Filharmonik Petronas) is Malaysia's first concert hall built specifically for Western classical music. It is the home of the Malaysian Philharmonic Orchestra (MPO), and has hosted many of the world's leading orchestras such as New York Philharmonic, Philadelphia Orchestra, BBC Symphony and Vienna Symphony.

The concert hall was designed by Cesar Pelli based on the inspiration from the traditional shoebox shape of the 19th century European classical music halls. It has the capacity to accommodate 920 seats which includes box seats, corporate suites and a royal suite. The stage floor is designed for flexibility, has an approximate area of 297m^{2}, and can be extended to 369m^{2}. The orchestra pit was designed to accommodate up to 45 musicians but can accommodate more with the existing stage extension.

== History ==
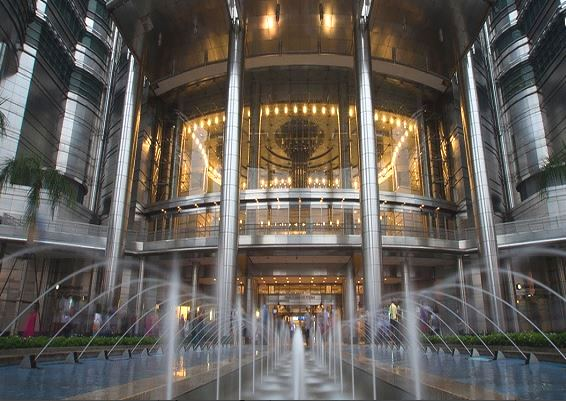
Main entrance to Petronas Philharmonic Hall

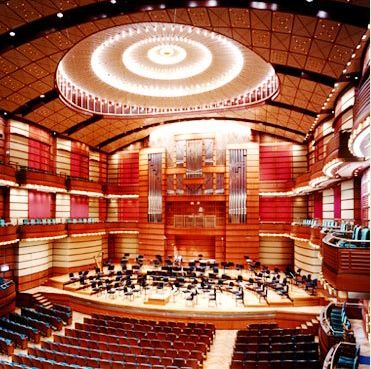
View from the box seat (Circle floor), next to the royal suite, overlooking the stage and the pipe organ

Official construction of the hall began on 1 January 1995 as part of the base floor of Petronas Twin Towers. The construction completed a year later on the same date in 1996 while further renovations were done until 1997.

The concert hall was officially opened to public on 17 August 1998 by the patron of Malaysian Philharmonic Orchestra, Tun Dr. Siti Hasmah Mohamad Ali and her husband, who is also the Prime Minister of Malaysia, Tun Dr. Mahathir Mohamad.

The hall has hosted some of the world's leading orchestras under renowned artists, including the New York Philharmonic, Philadelphia Orchestra, Singapore Symphony Orchestra, Vienna Symphony, Budapest Festival Orchestra, with artists such as Lorin Maazel, Lang Lang, Christoph Eschenbach, Janine Jansen and many more.

== Acoustic design ==
The hall is constructed with concealed movable ceiling panels which can be adjusted to alter the volume in the hall and simulate a wide range of acoustic environments. There are seven movable panels in the upper ceiling. In addition, special acoustically absorptive panels in the sidewalls can be opened or closed to adjust the resonance of the hall. This incorporate unique elements into the hall design in order to maximize the natural acoustic quality of the wood interior. The acoustical technique was designed by Kirkegaard Associates.

== Klais pipe organ ==
A pipe organ is built into the hall's façade designed by Johannes Klais Orgelbau GmbH based in Bonn; he was inspired from the angklung, a traditional Indonesian music instrument. The pipe organ adds further dimension to the musical sounds presented in the concert hall with 2,977 pipes ranging from 32 feet tall to the shortest at just over an inch. The inaugural performance of the pipe organ was held on 17 August 1998 by Simon Preston during the official opening of the hall.

=== Pipes specification ===
Description	Size (in millimetre)
Tallest wooden pipe	4,800 mm
Diameter of tallest wooden pipe	377 mm x 303 mm
Diameter of tallest metal pipe	271 mm
Diameter of shortest pipe	5 mm
Tallest metal pipe	6,180 mm with pipe-foot
Shortest metal pipe	6 mm without pipe-foot

== Sound and recording systems ==
The hall is equipped with performance sound maintaining synergy between the natural acoustics of the space and supplemental sound reinforcement for support of amplified concerts designed by (Engineering Harmonics). Petronas Philharmonic Hall is equipped with audio support and broadcast facilities, designed by Abbey Road Studios for recording, editing, broadcasting and monitoring performances in the concert hall. It aims to produce commercial quality recordings for selected performances.

== See also ==
- Malaysian Philharmonic Orchestra
- Malaysian Philharmonic Youth Orchestra
- List of concert hall in Malaysia
