= Kirkegaard Associates =

American acoustics design firm

Kirkegaard Associates is an American acoustics design firm founded by Lawrence Kirkegaard, based in Chicago, Illinois, with an office in Denver, Colorado. The company is headed by President/Owner Joseph W A Myers and employs 12 professionals in architecture, acoustics, music recording, mechanical and audio engineering, musical and theatrical performance. The company has been involved in the design of theatres, concert halls, opera houses, educational institutions, worship spaces, recording and broadcast studios, and other acoustically sensitive environments.

== Selected projects ==
- Experimental Media and Performing Arts Center, Troy, NY, USA
- Tennessee Theatre, Knoxville, TN, USA
- Bigelow Chapel at United Theological Seminary, New Brighton, MN, USA
- San Francisco Conservatory of Music, San Francisco, CA, USA
- Overture Center for the Arts, Madison, WI, USA
- Church of the Epiphany, Miami, FL, USA
- Clarice Smith Performing Arts Center at University of Maryland, College Park, MD, USA
- Petronas Philharmonic Hall, Kuala Lumpur, Malaysia
- Franklin & Marshall College Music Hall, Lancaster, Pennsylvania (completed 2000)
- Tanglewood Music Center, Lenox, MA, USA (completed 1994)
- Louise M. Davies Symphony Hall, San Francisco, CA USA (1986, completed 1992)
- Pressure Point Recording Studios, Chicago, IL, USA
- Royal Festival Hall at South Bank Centre, London, UK
- Sydney Conservatorium of Music, Sydney, Australia
- Shalin Liu Performance Center

In 2010 James R. Oestreich of The New York Times called Kirkegaard's 1994 Tanglewood Music Center "a major triumph" and called the acoustics of the recently opened Shalin Liu Performance Center "Superb". Describing the Overture Center in Madison, Wisconsin, Oestreich wrote that "the acoustics, designed by Kirkegaard Associates, sounded notably bright yet mellow, clean yet reverberant".
