= Günther Herbig =

German conductor (born 1931)

Günther Herbig (born 30 November 1931) is a German conductor.

Born in Ústí nad Labem, Czechoslovakia, Herbig studied conducting at the Franz Liszt Academy in Weimar in 1951 (then in East Germany) with Hermann Abendroth. He later was a student of Hermann Scherchen, Arvids Jansons, and Herbert von Karajan. After completing his studies, he became Kapellmeister at the Deutsches Nationaltheater and Staatskapelle Weimar in 1956. He subsequently held operatic posts in Erfurt and Potsdam. From 1972 to 1977, he was chief conductor of the Dresden Philharmonic. He was chief conductor of the Berlin Symphony Orchestra from 1977 to 1983. After a dispute with the SED Politburo, Herbig left the GDR and emigrated to the United States.

In North America, Herbig was music director of the Detroit Symphony Orchestra from 1984 to 1990. He worked regularly with the Toronto Symphony Orchestra from 1988 to 1994, initially as its artistic adviser and later as its music director. From 2001 to 2006 he served as chief conductor of Radio Symphony Orchestra Saarbrücken, now Deutsche Radio Philharmonie Saarbrücken Kaiserslautern. More recently Herbig has been the principal guest conductor and music adviser (2003–2006; and 2009–present) of the Columbus Symphony Orchestra. Since 2006 he has been the main invited conductor of the Orquesta Filarmónica de Gran Canaria (OFCG) in Spain

Herbig holds the title of conductor laureate of the Taiwan National Symphony Orchestra.

Cultural offices
Preceded by Kurt Sanderling	Principal Conductor, Berlin Symphony Orchestra; 1977–1983	Succeeded by Claus Peter Flor
Preceded by Sir Andrew Davis	Music Director, Toronto Symphony Orchestra; 1988–1994	Succeeded by Jukka-Pekka Saraste
