= Roger Nierenberg =

American conductor and author (born 1947)

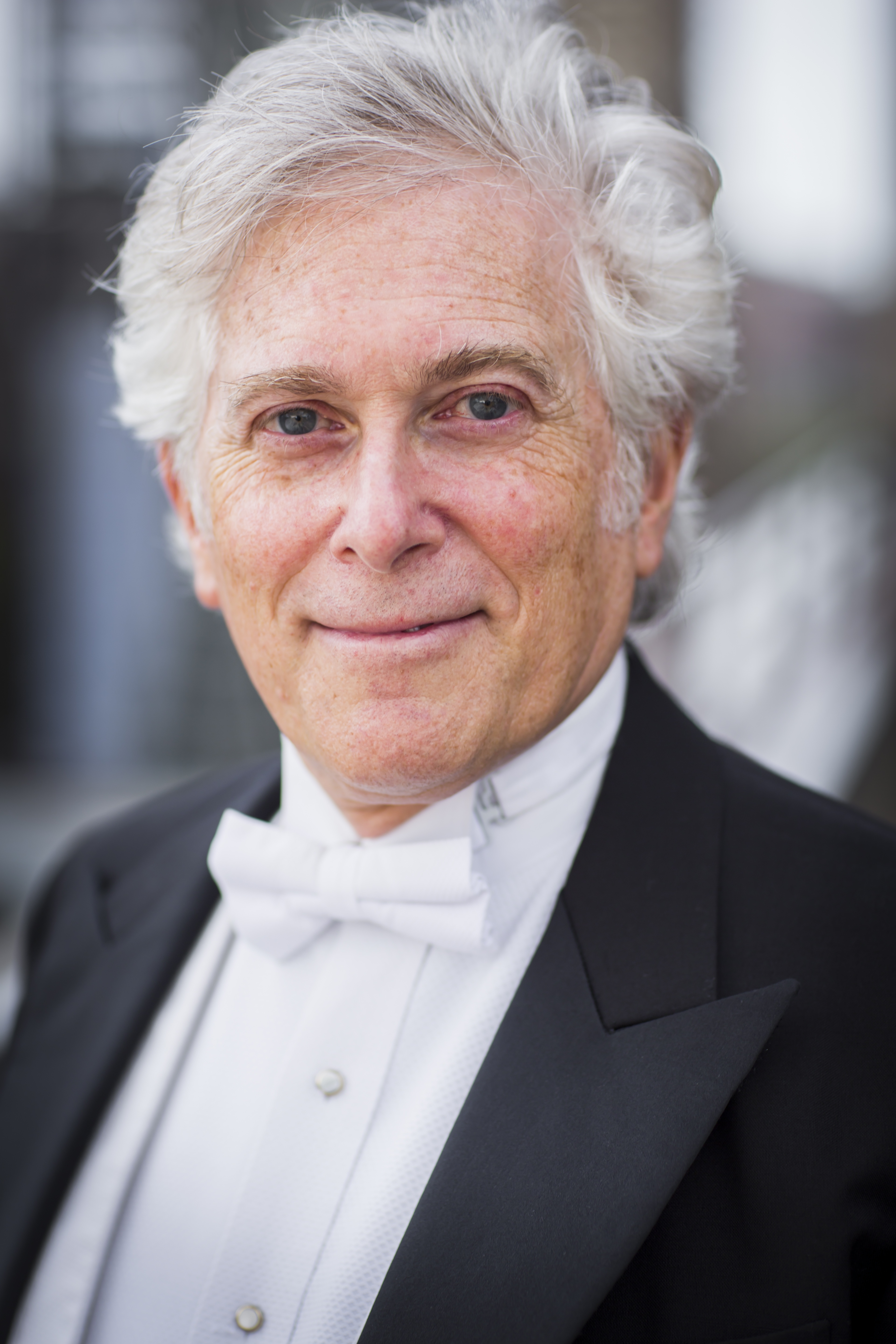

Background information
- Born: 1947 (age 77–78); New York City, New York, United States
- Genres: Classical
- Occupation(s): Conductor, author

Roger Nierenberg (born 1947) is an American conductor and author.

== Education ==
Nierenberg was born in New York City and studied composition in high school with Elie Siegmeister. He graduated from Princeton University, where he received high honors in composition and was awarded a Woodrow Wilson Fellowship. He holds graduate degrees in conducting from the Mannes College of Music and the Juilliard School, where he studied with Sixten Ehrling.

== Career ==
While still in his twenties, Roger Nierenberg worked on the faculty of Queens College (CUNY), where, among other roles, he was a one-semester substitute chorus director. For many years, Roger Nierenberg served as music director of the Stamford Symphony in Connecticut, the Jacksonville Symphony in Florida, and The Pro Arte Chorale. Nierenberg made his New York conducting debut at Avery Fisher Hall with the Pro Arte Chorale and Orchestra, and has conducted at the Lincoln Center's Mostly Mozart Festival. Guest conducting engagements include the National Symphony, the Opera Theatre of Saint Louis, the symphony orchestras of Detroit, St. Louis, Baltimore, Indianapolis, San Diego, New Jersey, and many other great American orchestras. Abroad, he has recorded with the London Philharmonic, and has conducted the London Mozart Players, Mexico's National Symphony Orchestra, the Prague Spring Festival, and the Beijing Festival. As a conductor of opera, Nierenberg has conducted at the Mostly Mozart Festival, the Chautauqua Opera, and Opera Theatre of St. Louis. Engagements at summer festivals have included the Tanglewood Institute, the Grand Teton Music Festival, and the Madeira Bach Festival.

His book Maestro: A Surprising Story About Leading by Listening was honored in 2009 as the Best Leadership Book by 800-CEO-READ.

Nierenberg is also the creator of The Music Paradigm, a pioneering learning experience for organizations of all types that brings live orchestral performances to audiences outside the traditional concert hall. Using music as a metaphor, Nierenberg conducts a professional orchestra in a series of spontaneous role-playing exercises that reveal how behavior and attitude impact results. Over the past twenty years, Nierenberg has presented to hundreds of organizations, from civic groups to Fortune 100 companies, in twenty-four countries with musicians from more than 95 professional orchestras.
