= Forgotten Land =

Forgotten Land may refer to:

== Arts and media ==
=== Books ===
- Forgotten Land, Journeys Among the Ghosts of East Prussia, 2001 book by Max Egremont
- Patagonia: A Forgotten Land: From Magellan to Peron, 2006 book by C. A. Brebbia, covers topic of Patagonia

=== Film ===
- The Forgotten Land, 2008 short film by Vera Mulyani
- Forgotten Land, 2009 film by Kostadin Kostadinov

=== Music ===
- La Tierra del Olvido (The Forgotten Land), 1995 album by Carlos Vives
- "Forgotten Land", song by Riverside from the 2011 album Memories in My Head
- "The Forgotten Lands", song by David Arkenstone from the 1996 album Return of the Guardians
- Forgotten Lands (for solo trumpet and orchestra), by Dave Maric, 2012

=== Video games ===
- Forgotten Lands: First Colony, 2008 video game by Blue Tea Games
- Kirby and the Forgotten Land, 2022 video game
- Forgotten Lands, the fictional universe for the 2018 video game Forgotten Anne

== Other uses in media ==
- Forgotten Land, 1964 art exhibition by Rafic Charaf
- Forgotten Land (ballet), by Jiří Kylián, 1981

== Other uses ==
- Forgotten Land Investment, breeder for racehorse Angel of Empire

== See also ==
- Forgotten Realms
- This Forgotten Land, album by Matti Bye
