= Colin Currie =

Scottish percussionist

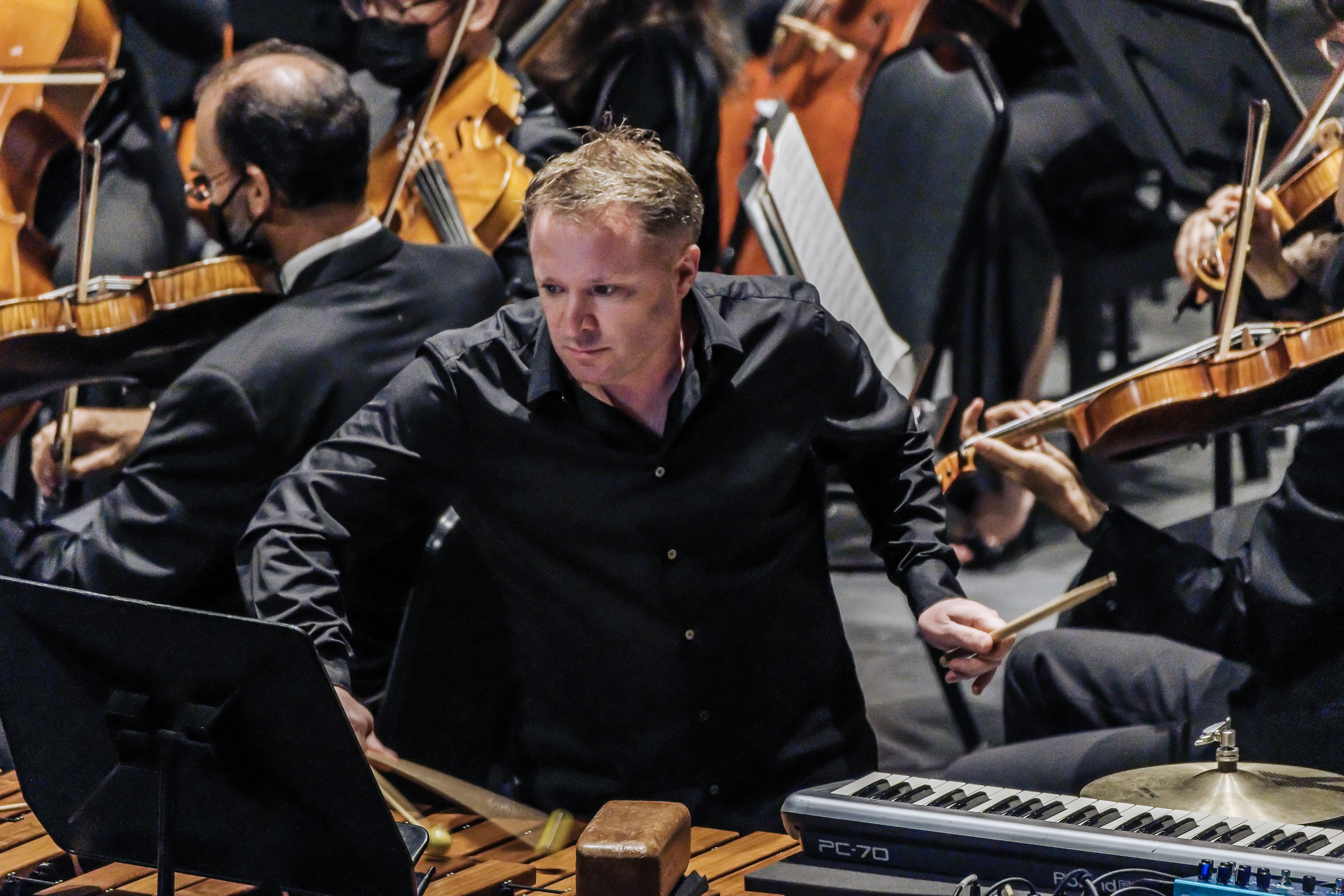
- Currie in 2022

Background information
- Born: Colin David Currie; Edinburgh, Scotland, UK
- Genres: Western classical music, contemporary classical music
- Instrument: percussion
- Years active: 1994–present
- Labels: Colin Currie Records, EMI Classics, BIS, Nonesuch, Ondine, LPO Live
- Member of: Colin Currie Group, Colin Currie Quartet
- Website: colincurrie.com

Colin David Currie is a Scottish virtuoso percussionist. He is the founder and leader of the Colin Currie Group, an ensemble specializing in performing and recording the music of Steve Reich.

== Biography ==
=== Early years ===
Colin Currie began his musical studies at the age of 5. He attended the Junior Department of the Royal Scottish Academy of Music and Drama from 1990 to 1994, where he studied percussion with Pamella Dow and piano with Sheila Desson, both of whom he cites as having an enormous influence on him. He went on to graduate from the Royal Academy of Music in 1998, and played principal timpani and percussion with the National Youth Orchestra of Scotland and The European Union Youth Orchestra. However, solo-performance and chamber music had by that time become his main focus.

Currie first came to national attention when he won the Gold Medal of the Shell/LSO Competition in 1992, and was subsequently the first percussionist to reach the finals of the BBC Young Musician of the Year competition in 1994.

=== Career ===
Currie is considered a charismatic and athletic percussionist and seen as a catalyst for the creation of new music.

Currie performs regularly with many orchestras and conductors around the world. Well known for championing new music, Currie has premiered works by composers such as Elliott Carter, Louis Andriessen, Einojuhani Rautavaara, Jennifer Higdon, Kalevi Aho, Rolf Wallin, Kurt Schwertsik, Simon Holt, Alexander Goehr, Dave Maric, Julia Wolfe and Nico Muhly.

Currie founded chamber ensemble The Colin Currie Group which specializes in the music of Steve Reich, and in 2018, formed the Colin Currie Quartet to perform works for percussion quartet.

He won the Royal Philharmonic Society Young Artist Award in 2000, was a BBC Radio 3 New Generation Artist between 2003 and 2005 and received a Bortletti Buitoni Trust Award in 2005.

He has made a number of recordings of contemporary percussion concerti and recorded a solo album, Borrowed Time', on the Onyx label. His recording of Jennifer Higdon's Percussion Concerto won the 2010 Grammy Award for Best Classical Contemporary Composition.

In May 2015, Currie was awarded the Royal Philharmonic Society Instrumentalist Award for achievement in the UK during 2014.

Currie has been Visiting Professor of Solo-Percussion in the Royal Academy of Music in London since 2005, and held the same position at the Royal Conservatoire in The Hague from 2005 to 2009. He has been a staunch champion of education and outreach in music throughout his career, having worked with a variety of age-groups.

In January 2011, Currie was appointed as an Artist in Residence at London's Southbank Centre and still holds this position. Currie has been a central figure in festivals hosted by the Southbank Centre: In autumn 2013 as part of the festival The Rest is Noise, Currie and members of the Colin Currie Group performed works by Stockhausen and Steve Reich, which Guy Dammann of The Guardian praised for being "technically impeccable and musically overwhelming". In 2014, The Southbank Centre presented Metal Wood Skin, a percussion festival dedicated to Currie. The festival included a number of new commissions, including the world premiere of Reich's Quartet for two vibraphones and two pianos and the UK premiere of Louis Andriessen’s Percussion Concerto, Tapdance, alongside new works by James MacMillan and Anna Clyne. In 2015, De Doelen in Rotterdam appointed Currie as Artist in Residence, during which, Currie debuted new works by Dave Maric and Reich. Later that year, Currie made his China debut with a performance at the National Centre for the Performing Arts (China) with the Miró Quartet.

In 2017, Currie launched Colin Currie Records, an independent label with distribution from LSO Live.

In recognition of Currie's continued success, the Junior Department of the Royal Scottish Academy of Music and Drama (now Royal Conservatoire of Scotland [RCS]) created the Colin Currie Percussion Competition and Prize. In 2022, the RCS went on to appoint Currie as an Associate Artist.

In October 2022, Currie was announced as the inaugural Ambassador for Chamber Music Scotland, a position he will hold until 2024.

Over the course of his career, Currie has made 14 appearances at the BBC Proms, his first was in 2000, performing Bernstein's Chichester Psalms, aged 22.

== Recordings ==
Album/Single	Orchestra/Ensemble	Soloist(s) (instrument)	Awards	Label	Year
Steve Reich: The Sextets	Colin Currie Group			Colin Currie Records	2026
Steve Reich: Music for 18 Musicians	Colin Currie Group, Synergy Vocals			Colin Currie Records	2023
Bryce Dessner: Tromp Miniature		Colin Currie (Marimba)		Colin Currie Records	2022
HK Gruber Percussion Concertos	BBC Philharmonic	Colin Currie (Percussion)		Colin Currie Records	2021
Kalevi Aho: Sieidi	Lahti Symphony Orchestra	Colin Currie (Percussion)		BIS Records	2020
Colin Currie & Steve Reich Live at Fondation Louis Vuitton	Colin Currie Group, Synergy Vocals			Colin Currie Records	2019
The Scene of the Crime		Håkan Hardenberger(Trumpet), Colin Currie (Percussion)		Colin Currie Records	2018
Steve Reich: Drumming	Colin Currie Group, Synergy Vocals		Diapason d'Or(April 2018)	Colin Currie Records	2018
Richard Rodney Bennett: Orchestral Works, Volume 1	BBC Scottish Symphony Orchestra	Colin Currie (Percussion)		Chandos Records	2017
Elliott Carter: Late Works	BBC Symphony Orchestra, Birmingham Contemporary Music Group	Colin Currie (Percussion), Pierre-Laurent Aimard (Piano), Isabelle Faust (Violin), Jean-Guihen Queyras (Cello)	BBC Music Magazine Awards, Premiere of the Year, 2018	Ondine	2017
CONTACT! with Alan Gilbert and David Robertson	New York Philharmonic	Colin Currie (Percussion), Eric Huebner (Piano)		New York Philharmonic Label	2012
MacMillan: Veni, Veni Emmanuel	Netherlands Radio Chamber Philharmonic	Colin Currie (Percussion), Gordan Nikolic (Violin)		Challenge Records	2012
Rautavaara: Incantations	Helsinki Philharmonic Orchestra	Colin Currie (Percussion), Truls Mørk (Cello)	Best Contemporary Recording, Gramophone Classical Music Awards, 2012	Ondine	2012
MacMillan, Adès and Higdon	London Philharmonic Orchestra	Colin Currie, (Percussion)	Grammy Award for Best Contemporary Classical Composition, 2010	LPO Label	2010
Borrowed Time: Music by Dave Maric		Colin Currie (Percussion), Dave Maric (Piano), Håkan Hardenberger (Flugelhorn and Trumpet), Sam Walton (Percussion), Clive Driskill-Smith (Organ)		Onyx Classics	2007
Striking a Balance: Contemporary Percussion Music		Colin Currie (percussion), Sam Walton (marimba), Robin Michael (piano)		EMI Classics	1998
