= Residentie Orchestra =

Het Residentie Orkest (lit. 'The Residence Orchestra'; known also in English as Residentie Orkest The Hague) is a Dutch orchestra based in The Hague. The orchestra is currently resident at the Amare performing arts centre in The Hague.

== History ==
Henri Viotta founded the orchestra in 1904. Its early home was the Gebouw voor Kunsten en Wetenschappen (K & W). The orchestra received its first acclaim during the 1911 Richard Strauss Festival, in which the composer himself conducted some of his works. The orchestra soon attracted other composers such as Igor Stravinsky, Max Reger, Maurice Ravel, and Paul Hindemith.

In 1915, the Residentie Orchestra took over the summertime performances of the Kurzaal Concerts in Scheveningen from the Orchestre Lamoureux. The orchestra's second chief conductor was the composer and conductor Peter van Anrooy, from 1917 until his resignation in 1935. Frits Schuurman became the next chief conductor, holding the post through World War II. After the war, Willem van Otterloo led the orchestra as chief conductor from 1949 to 1973.

After the K & W was destroyed in a fire in 1964, the orchestra played in various venues around the city without a permanent home. A fund-raising campaign, which included the release of several recordings known as "bouw-mee" ("build along") recordings, culminated in the construction of a new hall for the orchestra, the Dr. Anton Philipszaal, which was named after Anton Frederik Philips, co-founder of Philips Electronics. The orchestra took up residence in the Dr. Anton Philipszaal in September 1987, in a ceremony where the hall was formally opened in the presence of Queen Beatrix. From 2015 to 2021, the orchestra gave concerts at the Zuiderstrandtheater in Scheveningen.

Succeeding Van Otterloo as chief conductors were Jean Martinon, Ferdinand Leitner, Hans Vonk, and Evgeny Svetlanov. Jaap van Zweden, chief conductor from 2000 to 2005, now has the title of honorary guest conductor (ere-gastdirigent) with the orchestra. Neeme Järvi was chief conductor from 2005 to 2012, and subsequently held the title of chief conductor emeritus. In April 2013, the orchestra appointed Richard Egarr as its principal guest conductor (vaste gastdirigent) for an initial period of 3 years. In March 2014, the orchestra announced the elimination of the post of chief conductor and the formation of a new conductor hierarchy. In parallel, the orchestra announced the appointment of Jan Willem de Vriend to the post of vaste dirigent (principal conductor), effective 1 August 2015, for approximately 6 weeks per season with an initial contract of 4 years. In June 2015, the orchestra announced the appointment of Nicholas Collon as co-principal conductor, effective 1 August 2016, for a minimum term of 3 years, with 6 weeks of appearances per season. In June 2017, the orchestra announced Collon's appointment as its sole chief conductor and artistic advisor, effective 1 August 2018, with a minimum of 8 weeks of appearances per season. In parallel, de Vriend is to continue his formal relationship with the orchestra through the summer of 2019. Collon is scheduled to conclude his chief conductorship of the Residentie Orchestra at the close of the 2020–2021 season.

The orchestra has undertaken several major tours which included cities such as New York City, Boston, Chicago, Vienna, Munich and Berlin. It has performed under guest conductors including Leonard Bernstein, Pierre Boulez, Hans Knappertsbusch, Carl Schuricht, Arturo Toscanini, and Bruno Walter. The orchestra has commercially recorded works by Dutch composers such as Alphons Diepenbrock and Johannes Verhulst. A selection of recordings made during the fifties at the Amsterdam Concertgebouw under the baton of Willem van Otterloo has been issued on CD in 2007. The orchestra made its first appearance at The Proms in September 2008.

In October 2012, the city council of The Hague announced a reduction in the municipal subsidy for the orchestra, from 5.1 million € to 3.5 million €. The orchestra subsequently expressed concerns of consequences to the orchestra such as job losses for a number of the musicians, and diminished representation of larger-scale symphonic works in the orchestra's concert repertoire.

In November 2018, Anja Bihlmaier first guest-conducted the orchestra. Based on this appearance, in May 2019, the orchestra announced the appointment of Bihlmaier as its next chief conductor, effective with the 2021–2022 season. She is the first female conductor to be named chief conductor of the orchestra, and the second female conductor to be named chief conductor of a Dutch orchestra. In parallel with the appointment of Bihlmaier, the orchestra simultaneously announced the appointment of Jun Märkl as principal guest conductor, alongside Richard Egarr. In September 2021, the orchestra, conducted by Bihlmaier, gave its first performance at the new Amare performing arts centre in The Hague, the new performing venue for the orchestra. In December 2023, the orchestra announced that Bihlmaier is to stand down as its chief conductor at the close of the 2024-2025 season, and the appointment of Märkl as its next chief conductor, effective with the 2025-2026 season, with an initial contract of 4 years.

== Conductors ==
=== Chief Conductors ===
- Henri Viotta (1904–1917)
- Peter van Anrooy (1917–1935)
- Frits Schuurman (1938–1949)
- Willem van Otterloo (1949–1973)
- Jean Martinon (1974–1976)
- Ferdinand Leitner (1976–1980)
- Hans Vonk (1980–1992)
- Evgeny Svetlanov (1993–2000)
- Jaap van Zweden (2000–2005)
- Neeme Järvi (2005–2012)
- Nicholas Collon (2018–2021)
- Anja Bihlmaier (2021–2025)
- Jun Märkl (2025–present)

=== Honorary guest conductor ===
- Jaap van Zweden (2005–present)

=== Principal guest conductors ===
- Carl Schuricht (1930–1939)
- George Szell (1937–1939)
- Hiroyuki Iwaki (1969–1974)
- Alain Lombard (1979–1989)
- Günther Herbig (1990–1996)
- Oliver Knussen (1992–1996)
- George Pehlivanian (1996–1998)
- Richard Egarr (2013–present)
- Jan Willem de Vriend (2015–2019)
- Nicholas Collon (2016–2018)
- Jun Märkl (2021–2025)
