= Netherlands Radio Symphony Orchestra =

Dutch radio orchestra

- Orchestra
- Short name: NRSO
- Former name: Promenade Orchestra; Radio Chamber Orchestra (Omroep Orkest)
- Founded: 1985; 40 years ago
- Disbanded: 2005; 20 years ago
- Location: Netherlands
- Website: Official website

The Netherlands Radio Symphony Orchestra (NRSO) was a Dutch radio orchestra. It was founded in 1985 after a merger of the Radio Orchestra (Omroep Orkest), the Promenade Orchestra (Promenade Orkest) and the Radio Chamber Orchestra (Radio Kamerorkest). In 2005, the NRSO was disbanded, and its functions were absorbed into the Netherlands Radio Philharmonic and the Netherlands Radio Chamber Philharmonic. The NRSO's last concert took place on 7 July 2005.

== Productions ==
The orchestra participated in various operatic productions and in special musical projects as well as international competitions. It served as the regular accompanying orchestra of the Kiril Kondrashin Conductors' Masterclasses, the Oscar Back Concours, and the International Vocalists' Competition. The orchestra appeared at the Holland Festival, the Gaudeamus Week, and in several educational projects.

The NRSO had also served as the opera orchestra for a number of opera productions, including Rachmaninoff's Aleko, Erich Wolfgang Korngold's Die tote Stadt, and several operas of Gaetano Donizetti. It has also played in the Dutch première of Tri sestry (Three Sisters) by Peter Eötvös, in a co-production with the Netherlands Touring Opera Company.

== Chief conductors ==
The RSO's chief conductors included Kenneth Montgomery (1985–1989), Henry Lewis (1989–1991), Kees Bakels (1991–1996) and Eri Klas (1996–2003). Klas became Principal Guest Conductor in the 2003-2004 season. Hans Vonk held the title of Chief Conductor in the 2003-2004 season, the orchestra's last chief conductor. Vonk's neurodegenerative illness had debilitated him to the point that he conducted several NRSO concerts from a wheelchair. Other guest conductors have included Jiří Kout, János Fürst, Stanisław Skrowaczewski, Jaap van Zweden, and Alexander Lazarev, as well as Marc Soustrot, Armin Jordan, and Jean-Bernard Pommier.

- Kenneth Montgomery (1985–1989)
- Henry Lewis (1989–1991)
- Kees Bakels (1991–1996)
- Eri Klas (1996–2003)
- Hans Vonk (2003–2004)

== See also ==
- Netherlands Radio Philharmonic
- Netherlands Radio Chamber Philharmonic
