= Colin Currie Group =

British percussion group

The Colin Currie Group is a British percussion group founded and led by Colin Currie. This ensemble is dedicated to performing and recording the music of Steve Reich.

== Career ==
Percussionist Colin Currie has been fascinated by Steve Reich's music since he was a teenager. He formed The Colin Currie Group in 2006 for a performance of Drumming, by Steve Reich, at the BBC Proms to celebrate the composer's 70th birthday. The Colin Currie Group continued to perform Drumming around the world, and have since added a number of works by Reich to their repertoire, such as Music for 18 Musicians, Sextet, Tehillim, and Music for Pieces of Wood. Reich has worked closely with the ensemble, and has said that Colin Currie is “one of the greatest musicians working in the world today.” Reich has performed with the Colin Currie Group, notably for a performance of his Clapping Music, in a concert that saw the 2014 world premiere of Quartet for two vibraphones and two pianos.

The Colin Currie Group has performed extensively in the United Kingdom, as well as performing their international debut at Tokyo Opera City Concert Hall in 2012, and their European debut at the Concertgebouw, Amsterdam. They have also performed at Elbphilharmonie, Hamburg, London's Southbank Centre, the Paris Cité de la Musique, Cologne Philharmonie, Prague Strings of Autumn Festival, Rotterdam De Doelen, Glasgow Minimal Festival, Helsinki Festival, and the Macau Festival.

The group contains up to a dozen members in addition to Currie, according to the pieces performed. (Note: The photo gallery on the group's website displays the portraits of 12 musicians in addition to Currie.)

In 2017, The Colin Currie Group successfully crowdfunded a recording of Reich's Drumming, exceeding their goal, and released this recording on Colin Currie Records in February 2018. In February 2018, Nonesuch Records released a recording of Colin Currie Group performing Steve Reich's Quartet, paired with the composer's Pulse, performed by International Contemporary Ensemble.

In 2023 the Colin Currie Group released a recording of Reich's Music for 18 Musicians.
