= Music for 18 Musicians =

Minimal music piece by Steve Reich

- by Steve Reich
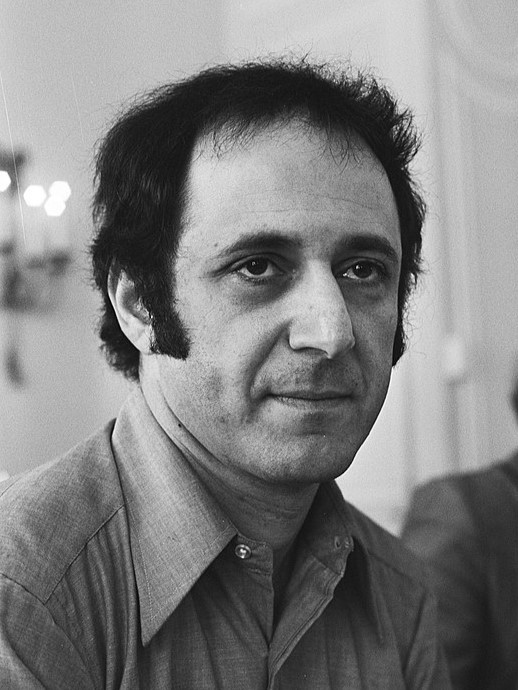
- Steve Reich in 1976
- Genre: Minimalism
- Composed: 1975
- Recorded: 1978
- Duration: approx. 60 minutes

Premiere
- Date: April 24, 1976
- Location: The Town Hall, New York City, New York, US

Music for 18 Musicians is a work of minimalist music by Steve Reich. The composition is organized in 11 sections, each based on a single chord. It was composed iteratively, developed in rehearsals with an ensemble, between 1974 and 1976. 18 Musicians premiered in New York City in 1976 and was first recorded in 1978 by Reich and his ensemble. Several subsequent recordings were released, beginning in 1997.

== Composition ==
Music for 18 Musicians was composed between May 1974 and March 1976. Rehearsals began in early 1975. Instrumentation shifted throughout early rehearsals; eventually, Reich settled on "three marimbas, two xylophones, vibraphone, maracas, violin, cello, two clarinets doubling on bass clarinets, four women’s voices, and four pianos". The composition and performance process was iterative and collaborative. Performers developed cues for one another, sometimes relying on a particular sound and sometimes on a specific musician.

In his introduction to the score, Reich mentions that although the piece is named Music for 18 Musicians, it is not necessarily advisable to perform the piece with that few players due to the extensive need for musicians to perform on multiple instruments.

== Structure ==
The piece is based on a cycle of eleven chords. The eleven chords are each presented in the first section of the piece and each provides a motif for the subsequent sections. Each section, which is approximately four minutes long, begins with one chord and then, at the end, evolves into the next chord—which then develops into another four-minute movement. The last section is an epilogue that echoes the first.

The overall structure takes the form ABCDCBA. Throughout, 18 Musicians is organized around an eighth-note pulse driven by the marimbas and pianos. The rhythm, structured around a 12-beat meter with variations, is based on a pattern played in atsiagbekor on the agogô or gankogui bell. Individual phrases are limited in duration by performers' breath.

== Performances and recordings ==
In May 1975, 18 Musicians was performed as a work in progress at The Kitchen. It was billed as a work for 21 musicians, although only 18 performed. It premiered at The Town Hall on April 24, 1976.

Since the original 1978 version, over a dozen recordings of 18 Musicians have been released, the most notable of which are listed below. Each is approximately one hour long; some are a few minutes shorter and others slightly longer. Two recordings by solo musicians using overdubs have been released, by James Birchall (as Rough Fields) in 2014 and Erik Hall in 2020. The 1997 recording for Nonesuch Records won the Grammy Award for Best Small Ensemble Performance. Reich Remixed (also released on Nonesuch in 1997) includes a remix by the British duo Coldcut.

Year	Label	Ensemble	Reference
1978	ECM Records	Steve Reich and Musicians	
1997	Nonesuch Records	Steve Reich and Musicians	
1999	RCA Records	Ensemble Modern	
2003	Hungaroton	Amadinda Percussion Group	
2007	Innova	Grand Valley State University New Music Ensemble	
2014	Bomb Shop	Rough Fields (James Birchall)	
2015	Harmonia Mundi	Ensemble Signal	
2020	Western Vinyl	Erik Hall	
2023	Colin Currie Records	Colin Currie Group and Synergy Vocals	

== Reception ==
A 2001 survey of American art music describes 18 Musicians as "one of a handful of late 20th-century works that can rightly claim to have altered the course of Western music". K. Robert Schwarz, in his survey Minimalists (1996), calls 18 Musicians "perhaps Reich's greatest composition".

Schwarz goes on to observe, following Reich's own comments, that it departs from the austere, highly structured, "bare-bones" minimalist compositions of the 1960s and embraces (as Reich stated) "beautiful music above everything else". The critic Tom Johnson, in a negative contemporary review, noted the same departure from Reich's more rigid pieces Four Organs and Music for Pieces of Wood. The composition's "lushness", according to Johnson, recalled Ravel or Mahler and not minimalism as Reich had developed it in his earlier work.

Michael Walsh, a critic, reviewed the original ECM recording in advance of a performance of 18 Musicians and Drumming by Steve Reich and Musicians on March 6, 1978, in San Francisco, as part of a five-city tour. He distinguished 18 Musicians from "avant-garde" music, characterized by atonal composition, noting that it had "clear tonal center" and "tonal patterns". He described the work as "hypnotic", noting its departure from the Western classical music tradition in favor of other traditions including the gamelan orchestra.

== Works cited ==
- Hartenberger, Russell (October 6, 2016). "Music for 18 Musicians". Performance Practice in the Music of Steve Reich. Cambridge University Press. pp. 185–234. doi:10.1017/cbo9781316584965.018. ISBN 978-1-316-58496-5.
- Key, Susan; Rothe, Larry, eds. (2001). American Mavericks: Visionaries, Pioneers, Iconoclasts. University of California Press; San Francisco Symphony. ISBN 978-0-520-23305-8.
- Schwarz, K. Robert (1990). "Process vs. Intuition in the Recent Works of Steve Reich and John Adams". Journal of the Society for American Music. 8 (3): 245–273. doi:10.2307/3052096. JSTOR 3052096.
- Schwarz, K. Robert (1996). Minimalists. Phaidon Press. ISBN 978-0-7148-3381-1.
