= Mulyani =

Mulyani is an Indonesian surname. Notable people with the surname include:

- Sri Mulyani (born 1962), Indonesian economist
- Vera Mulyani (born 1985), Indonesian architect, filmmaker, and children's author
