= Radio Filharmonisch Orkest =

Dutch radio orchestra

- Radio orchestra
- Short name: RFO
- Founded: 1945; 81 years ago
- Location: Hilversum, Netherlands
- Principal conductor: Karina Canellakis
- Website: Official website

The Radio Filharmonisch Orkest (Radio Philharmonic Orchestra; Dutch abbreviation RFO) is a Dutch radio orchestra, based in Hilversum. The RFO performs under the aegis of the Muziekcentrum van de Omroep (Broadcasting Music Centre; NMBC), an umbrella organization bringing together the music departments of the various broadcasting associations affiliated to Nederlandse Publieke Omroep (Dutch Public Broadcasting).

The RFO performs on NPO Radio 4 and gives public concerts in Amsterdam and Utrecht. It has also served as the orchestra for productions at De Nederlandse Opera. The RFO's programmes are decided by the above-mentioned Muziekcentrum, rather than directly by the orchestra's management and chief conductor. The current manager of the RFO is Wouter den Hond.

== History ==
Albert van Raalte founded the orchestra in 1945 and served as its first chief conductor. Past chief conductors have included Paul van Kempen, Bernard Haitink, Jean Fournet, Willem van Otterloo, Hans Vonk, and Sergiu Comissiona. Edo de Waart was chief conductor of the RFO from 1989 to 2004 and is now its conductor laureate. Jaap van Zweden was chief conductor and artistic director of the RFO from 2005 to 2012, and now has the title of honorair gastdirigent (honorary guest conductor, or principal guest conductor). In August 2010, the RFO announced the appointment of Markus Stenz as its eighth chief conductor, effective from the start of the 2012–2013 season, with an initial contract of three years. Stenz concluded his tenure as the RFO's chief conductor in 2019.

In October 2010, the coalition Dutch government had announced plans for complete defunding of the Muziekcentrum van de Omroep by the year 2012, with the potential threat of the dissolution of the RFO. After protests, the Dutch Minister of Education, Culture and Sciences Marja van Bijsterveldt announced in December 2010 a partial restoration of funds to the NMBC at a level of €12 million-14 million. In December 2012, the RFO named Bernard Haitink as its patron, following his advocacy for the orchestra in the wake of the proposed defunding.

In March 2018, Karina Canellakis first guest-conducted the RFO, with concerts in Utrecht and Amsterdam. On the basis of these concerts, the RFO announced in May 2018 the appointment of Canellakis as its next chief conductor, effective with the 2019–2020 season, with an initial contract of 4 years. Canellakis is the first female conductor to be named chief conductor of the RFO. The RFO is the first Dutch orchestra ever to name a female conductor as its chief conductor. In September 2021, the RFO announced the extension of Canellakis' contract as its chief conductor through July 2027. In April 2025, the RFO announced a further extension of Canellakis' contract as chief conductor through August 2031.

Past principal guest conductors of the RFO have included James Gaffigan, who held the post from 2011 to 2023. In January 2022. the RFO announced the appointment of Stéphane Denève as its next principal guest conductor, effective with the 2023–2024 season. Denève had first guest-conducted the RFO in 2014. In May 2026, the RFO announced the extension of Denève's contract as principal guest conductor through the 2030–2031 season.

== Principal conductors ==
- Albert van Raalte (1945–1949)
- Paul van Kempen (1949–1955)
- Bernard Haitink (1957–1961)
- Jean Fournet (1961–1978)
- Hans Vonk (1978–1979)
- Sergiu Comissiona (1982–1989)
- Edo de Waart (1989–2004)
- Jaap van Zweden (2005–2012)
- Markus Stenz (2012–2019)
- Karina Canellakis (2019–present)

== See also ==
- Netherlands Radio Chamber Philharmonic
