= Anton van Anrooy =

Dutch/British painter (1870–1949)

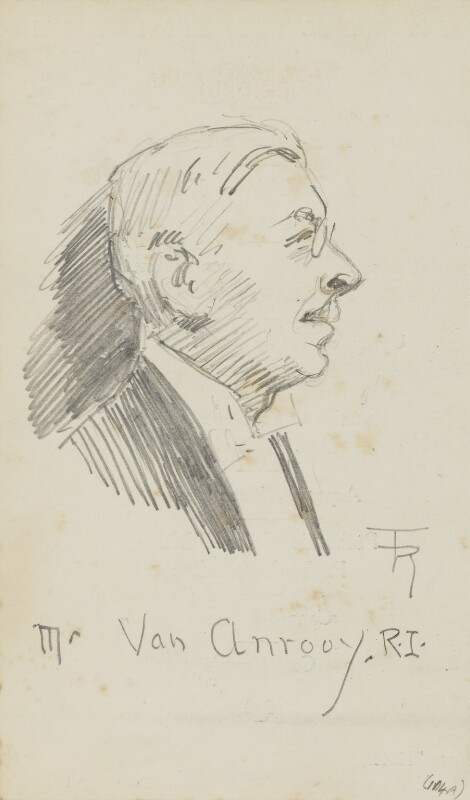
- Born: 11 January 1870; Zaltbommel, Netherlands
- Died: 13 February 1949 (aged 79); London, England
- Occupation: Painter

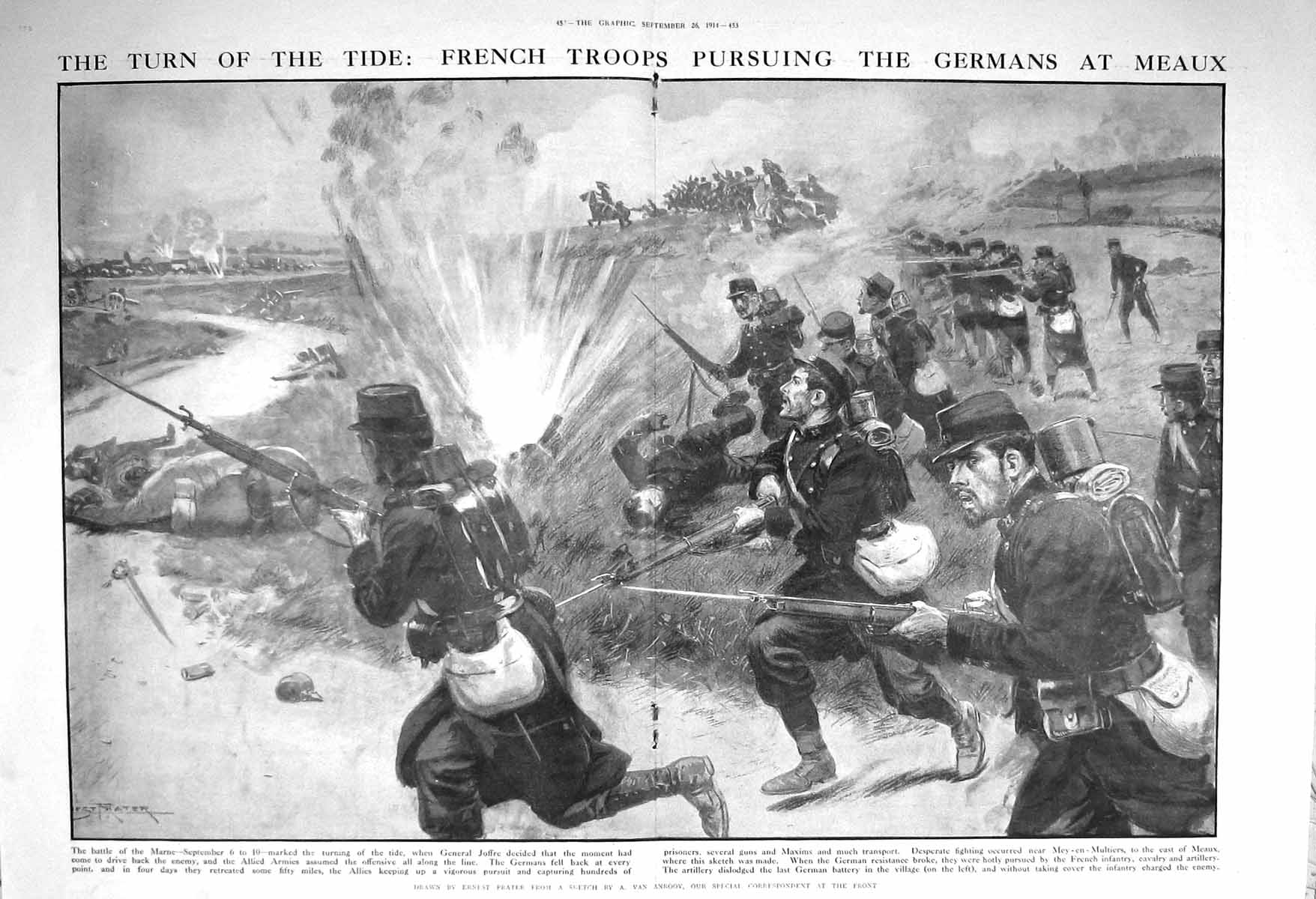
French Troops pursuing the Germans at Meaux. The Graphic after a sketch by A. Van Anrooy, our special correspondent at the front

Anton Abraham van Anrooy (11 January 1870 – 13 February 1949) was a Dutch painter and illustrator, naturalised as British.

== Life ==
Van Anrooy was born in Zaltbommel in the Netherlands, son of Peter Gysbert van Anrooy and his wife Josephine Maria Louisa. He studied architecture at Delft Polytechnic (now the Delft University of Technology) until 1892 and then art in evening classes at the Royal Academy of Art, The Hague, where he was taught by Adolf le Comte, Frits Jansen and Paul Tetar van Elven, until 1896, when he moved to London, where he remained for the rest of his life. He was naturalised as a British citizen in 1915.

During World War I he was an official war artist for the Netherlands. He was later awarded the Order of Orange-Nassau.

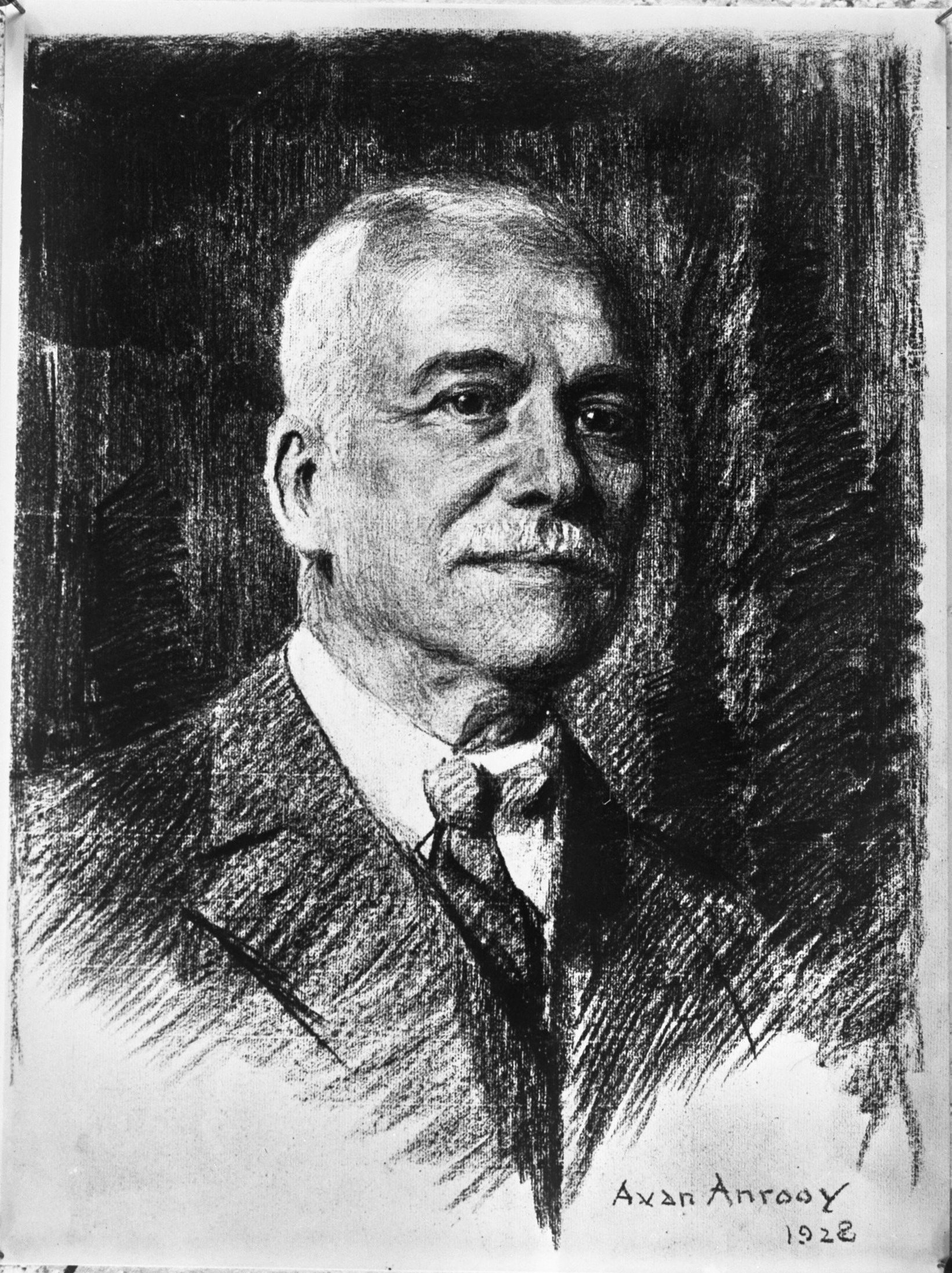
Henri Deterding, preparatory drawing for Anrooy's portrait submitted to 1928 Olympics art competition (Dutch National Archives)

He painted in oils, watercolours and pastels, producing mostly portraits, interiors and still lifes. He also designed posters, particularly for the railway companies LNER and GWR. One of his best known works is his 1928 poster showing the Amsterdam Marathon Tower advertising rail travel to the 1928 Olympics from Harwich. His work was part of the art competitions at the 1928 Summer Olympics, to which he submitted a portrait of Henri Deterding, and the 1932 Summer Olympics.

In the last decade of his life he was much interested in photogrammetry and its advancement.

He was elected a member of the Royal Institute of Painters in Water Colours (RI) in 1915. He also exhibited at the Royal Academy, the Walker Art Gallery, the Royal Glasgow Institute of the Fine Arts and the Goupil Gallery.

He married Rach(a)el Stewart Sharp Keith (1879–1973) in 1912 but had no children.

== Selected works ==
- Victoria and Albert Museum:

A Canal at Amersfoort (watercolour, 1901)
The Broads: 200 Miles of Safe Inland Waterways (LNER poster, c. 1923–1924)
Delft via Harwich & Hook of Holland (LNER poster, c. 1924)

- Rijksmuseum, Amsterdam:

Portrait of Pangeran Ario Soejono, Minister without Portfolio in War Cabinet in London (oil on canvas, nd)
Study of the Entire Composition for the (Unfinished) Painting of the Dutch Court in London, June 1942 (pencil drawing, 1942)

- UCL Art Museum:

Donald James Mackay (1839–1921), KT, FBA, Lord Reay (oil on canvas, 1919)

- The British Academy:

Donald James Mackay (1839–1921), KT, FBA, 11th Baron Reay (oil on canvas, 1913)

- National Trust for Scotland (Pitmedden Garden):

Interior with Woman Reading (oil on canvas, c. 1930)

- National Library of Wales:

The Interior of St David's Cathedral (oil on board, 1921)

== See also ==
- Peter van Anrooy
