= Miroslav Miletić =

Croatian composer & violinist (1925–2018)

Miroslav Miletić (Croatian pronunciation: [mǐrɔlaʋ mîlɛitɕ]; (22 August 1925 – 3 January 2018) was a Croatian composer and a violin and viola player and teacher.

== Education ==
Born in Sisak, Croatia, Miletić graduated violin from the Zagreb Academy of Music in 1953, in the class of Stjepan Šulek and I. Pinkava, and chamber music in the class of Antonio Janigro. He studied composition privately, and his understanding of music was further deepened through studies in different European centers such as Salzburg, Austria and Hilversum, the Netherlands, where he studied conducting with Lovro von Matačić and Willem van Otterloo, respectively. He continued mastering his studies in Prague; viola with Ladislav Černý, and composition with Pavel Bořkovec.

Miletić collaborated also with Karlheinz Stockhausen on electronic music and continued his studies of contemporary chamber music in Darmstadt in Germany.

== Viola player and a music teacher ==
As time went by, viola was more and more becoming his primary instrument. Miletić performed as a soloist with Leningrad Philharmonic Orchestra, Slovenian Philharmonic Orchestra, Radio Bratislava Symphonic Orchestra, and since 1946 he was an active violist of the Zagreb Radio Symphony and the Zagreb Philharmonic Orchestra. In the 1950s he accepted a full-time position as a viola and violin teacher (as well as the String Department Chair for many years) at the "Pavao Markovac Music School" in Zagreb, Croatia. Even then, due to his excellent sight-reading abilities, he would jump in whenever the Symphony or Philharmonic needed support. However, as a violist, Miletić has found his full expression in chamber music.

In 1982 he retired from his teaching position. He currently resides and composes in Zagreb, Croatia.

== Founder, artistic director, and active member of "Pro Arte Zagreb" Quartet ==
He was not only the founder and an active member of the "Pro Arte Zagreb" String Quartet, but also the artistic director and manager. The quartet performed at more than 2000 concerts, and published records and CDs under his professional guidance. The majority of concerts were held outside Croatia (then Yugoslavia), namely in Europe, Africa, former Soviet Union, and USA. The quartet was invited to two All-State tours throughout the major cities in the US, in 1969 and again in 1972 where they performed in a different city every two days.

The quartet has played a significant role in the Croatian music circles through well-thought-out repertoire choices pointing towards modern music, in particular Croatian music, as well as introducing this music to the audiences around the world.

== Croatian Composer ==
The compositions of Miletić often reflect aspects of Croatian national folklore. Miletić writes symphonic music, operas, concerti, chamber music, solo piano works, and film music. His compositions are primarily written for the violin, viola and guitar.

His international success as a composer started in 1958 with the debut of his Concerto for Viola and Orchestra in Hilversum, Nederlands. His chamber works and compositions for the guitar, the violin, and the viola have been published by many international publishers (Schott, Berben, Barenreiter, Meckverlag, Pizzicatto and Edition-Pax). One of his LPs was released in the US.

== Awards and acknowledgements ==
Miletić has won many international awards and acknowledgments. Among them are the "Gaudeamus Foundation Award" (Netherlands, 1959) for the Concerto For Viola and Orchestra, the "Golden Lion" in Venice (1960) for music for the film Piko, two gold medals in the Viotti International Music Competition, Vercelli (1967) - for Diptych for Cello and Piano, and Suite In Modo Antico for Flute and Piano. He is also the recipient of numerous domestic awards and prizes.

Every year, in his home town of Sisak, Croatia there is a two-day concert celebration in his honor entitled "The Music Days of Miroslav Miletić". He has been exclusively featured at concerts throughout the world (Paris, Tokyo, Trieste, Vienna, Zagreb, Sisak).

His "Ples za Violinu Solo" (1958) is the most performed classical composition in the history of Croatian music. The musical score for this piece can be found at the university libraries all over the world. http://www.worldcat.org/title/ples-za-violinu-solo/oclc/18252047

Miletić is a member of the international juries at the guitar competitions in Switzerland and Italy, an active member of Croatian Composers' Society, and one of the founders of the Croatian Section of the European Viola Society.

== Reviews ==
"His knowledge of the modern music trends and a partial use of the avant-garde music experiences in many a composition never eliminated his fascination with simplicity, even naivety, we could say, of the melodic elements and rhythmics of original folklore provenance. This is particularly audible in his famous compositions Danza per violino solo, Folklore Cassations, Croatian Suite for the guitar, in string quartets (e.g. Second Quartet, called Dalmatian), Sonata for Viola and Piano, Sonatina for Violin and Guitar, Mladen’s Poems and finally, in the striking example of the so called “new simplicity” or “new romanticism”, his Concerto for the Piano from 1987, called Style Exercises.

In all these works, Miletic protects the uniqueness of his musical expression, showing that his interesting composer’s profile was formed by the essential creator’s curiosity versus the experience of the New as well as equally essential need of the artist to look for and recognize his traditional roots. In this way, the interspace between these two extremes becomes the real “space for playing” for Miletic’s imagination where he creates, sometimes with surprising simplicity, approaching in his best works, the authenticity and sincerity of expression of our masters of the naive painting.

In his letter to Miletic, the English writer Alan Sillitoe found his music “full of life, grace and energy” adding also that it is “pure, clear and full of interest, as well as comprehensible to the heart”."

- (Review by Bosiljka Peric-Kempf, 10/2001 "The Music Days of Miroslav Miletic" program brochure)

== Major works ==
This opus is far from being complete. The daughter of prof. Miletić, Jasmina Balogh Miletić is working together with the MIC - Muzički Informativni Centar Koncertne Direkcije (The Music Information Centre of The Zagreb Concert Management) on completing the works. If you have any questions or requests, please contact Jasmina Balogh Miletić via email or MIC via their website: http://mic.hr.

=== Orchestral compositions ===
- Symphonic Suite with Children's Toys (1965)
- Folklore Cassations for Strings (1967)
- Symphony for Wind Instruments (1980)

=== Concert works ===
- Concertos for:

- viola and chamber orchestra (1958)
- flute and strings (1971)
- guitar and large symphony orchestra (1977)
- clarinet and large symphony orchestra (1978)
- horn and strings (1980)
- violin and chamber orchestra (Promenade Concerto, 1986)
- piano and strings or piano and wings (Style Exercises, 1987)
- harpsichord and strings (1992)
- two violas and symphony orchestra (1993)
- saxophone and symphony orchestra (1999)

- Concerto Grosso for viola and string orchestra (2005); Cantus Publishing
- Epitaf za Pepina (Epitaph for Pepin) for viola and string orchestra (2008)

=== Chamber music ===
- String Quartets

- I (1951)
- II (The Dalmatian, 1954)
- III (1960)
- IV (Dance Scenes, 1962)
- V (1968)

- Proportions for Six Instruments (1962)
- Piano Trio (1966)
- The Pastoral Trio (flute, clarinet and guitar, 1969)
- Four Folklore Designs (flute, oboe, clarinet, bassoon, 1969)
- 8 Minutes for Henry (flute, violin, trumpet and percussion, 1972)
- Hommage a Lackovic (oboe, clarinet and bassoon, 1979)
- The Istrian Diptych (clarinet and string quartet, 1987)

=== For viola ===
- À Naruhito & Masako: Uspavanka (Komoriuta / 子守唄 / Lullaby) for viola and piano (2001)
- Fantazija na teme B. Brittena (Fantasia on Themes by Benjamin Britten) for viola and piano (1993)
- Iz kajdanke A. Dobronića: prisjecánje na dječje zborove (From the Music Manuscript of Antun Dobronić: Reflections on Children's Choruses) for viola and piano (1997)
- Kroateska (Croatesque) for viola solo (2001)
- Lament for viola and electronic sounds (1963)
- Male skladbe (Miniatures) for viola and piano
- Monodia for viola solo (1990)
- Monolog (Monologue) for viola and piano (1965)
- Rapsodija (Rhapsodie) for viola and piano (1955)
- Sonata for viola and piano (1981)

=== For guitar ===
- Suite from Medjimurje (1974)
- Kroatiche Suite, Two Dodecaphonic Etudes (1976)
- Consort Trio (3 guitars, 1984)
- Burdon Suita (4 guitars, 1994)

=== For accordion ===
- Concert Suite (1991)
- Istrian Sequence (1993)

=== For various ensembles ===
- Hvar Litany for organ (1972)
- Istarski način (In the Istrian Style), Trio for flute, clarinet and viola (1983)
- Suita for viola d'amore and harpsichord (1994)
- Sonatina for violin and guitar (1981)
- Three Popular Songs from Dalmatia for voice and guitar (1981)
- Centone for flute and guitar (1998)

=== Music for stage ===
- The Wife of Hasan-Aga (music drama, 1964)
- A Court Case (one-act comic opera, 1985)
- The Turks at Sisak (a play with music, 1988)
- Karolina Suhodolska (opera, 1996)

== See also ==
- List of symphony orchestras in Europe
