= Nicholas Collon =

British conductor (born 1983)

- Born: 7 February 1983; 43 years ago London, England
- Education: Eton College; Clare College, Cambridge
- Occupation: Conductor
- Organizations: Aurora Orchestra; Residentie Orchestra; Finnish Radio Symphony Orchestra

Nicholas Collon (born 7 February 1983) is a British conductor.

== Biography ==
Born in London, Collon was a viola player, organist and pianist by training. He played viola in the National Youth Orchestra of Great Britain (NYOGB). He studied at Eton and was an organ scholar at Clare College, Cambridge. One of his conducting mentors was Sir Colin Davis, and Collon has served as an assistant conductor to Sir Mark Elder.

In 2004, Collon, Robin Ticciati and fellow NYOGB musicians founded the Aurora Orchestra, with Collon as its artistic director. He was awarded the 2008 Arts Foundation Fellowship for conducting, from a list of twenty nominated British conductors. For the 2011–2012 season, Collon was Assistant Conductor of the London Philharmonic Orchestra.

In April 2007, Collon conducted Mozart's The Magic Flute, directed by Samuel West, in Ramallah and Bethlehem, the first-ever staged opera production in the West Bank, and returned in 2009 with the same team for performances of Puccini's La bohème. His English National Opera conducting debut was in September 2012, The Magic Flute as the 14th revival of Nicholas Hytner's staging. A reviewer from The Guardian noted that he "enticed well-paced, zestful playing from the orchestra". In June 2013, he conducted the British stage premiere of Jonathan Harvey's opera Wagner Dream for Welsh National Opera.

In June 2015, the Residentie Orchestra in The Hague announced the appointment of Collon as its co-principal conductor, effective 1 August 2016, and in June 2017, the Residentie Orchestra announced Collon's appointment as the Residentie Orchestra's sole chief conductor and artistic advisor, effective 1 August 2018, with a minimum of eight weeks of appearances per season. He stood down as chief conductor of the Residentie Orchestra at the close of the 2020–2021 season.

In 2017, Collon first guest-conducted the Finnish Radio Symphony Orchestra (FRSO). In May 2019, the FRSO announced the appointment of Collon as its next chief conductor, effective with the 2021–2022 season. He is the first non-Finnish conductor to be named chief conductor of the FRSO. In February 2023, the FRSO announced the extension of Collon's contract as its chief conductor through the 2027–2028 season.

In 2026 Collon conducted the Aurora Orchestra in a concert of the Rh at the Kur , with pianist Hay who played his versions of Gershwin's Rhapsody in Blue and Ravel's Boléro. The program closed with Mahler's First Symphony, played standing and from memory, a specialty of the orchestra. A reviewer noted the great communication among the performers and with their conductor.

Collon has conducted commercial recordings with the Aurora Orchestra for Warner Classics.

Collon is married to flautist Jane Mitchell, creative leader of the Aurora Orchestra.

Cultural offices
Preceded by (no predecessor)	Principal Conductor, Aurora Orchestra; 2004–present	Succeeded by incumbent
Preceded by Neeme Järvi (chief conductor)	Co-Principal Conductor, Residentie Orchestra; 2016–2018	Succeeded by incumbent (as chief conductor)
Preceded by Neeme Järvi	Chief Conductor, Residentie Orchestra; 2018–2021	Succeeded by Anja Bihlmaier
Preceded by Hannu Lintu	Chief Conductor, Finnish Radio Symphony Orchestra; 2021–present	Succeeded by incumbent
