= Anja Bihlmaier =

German conductor

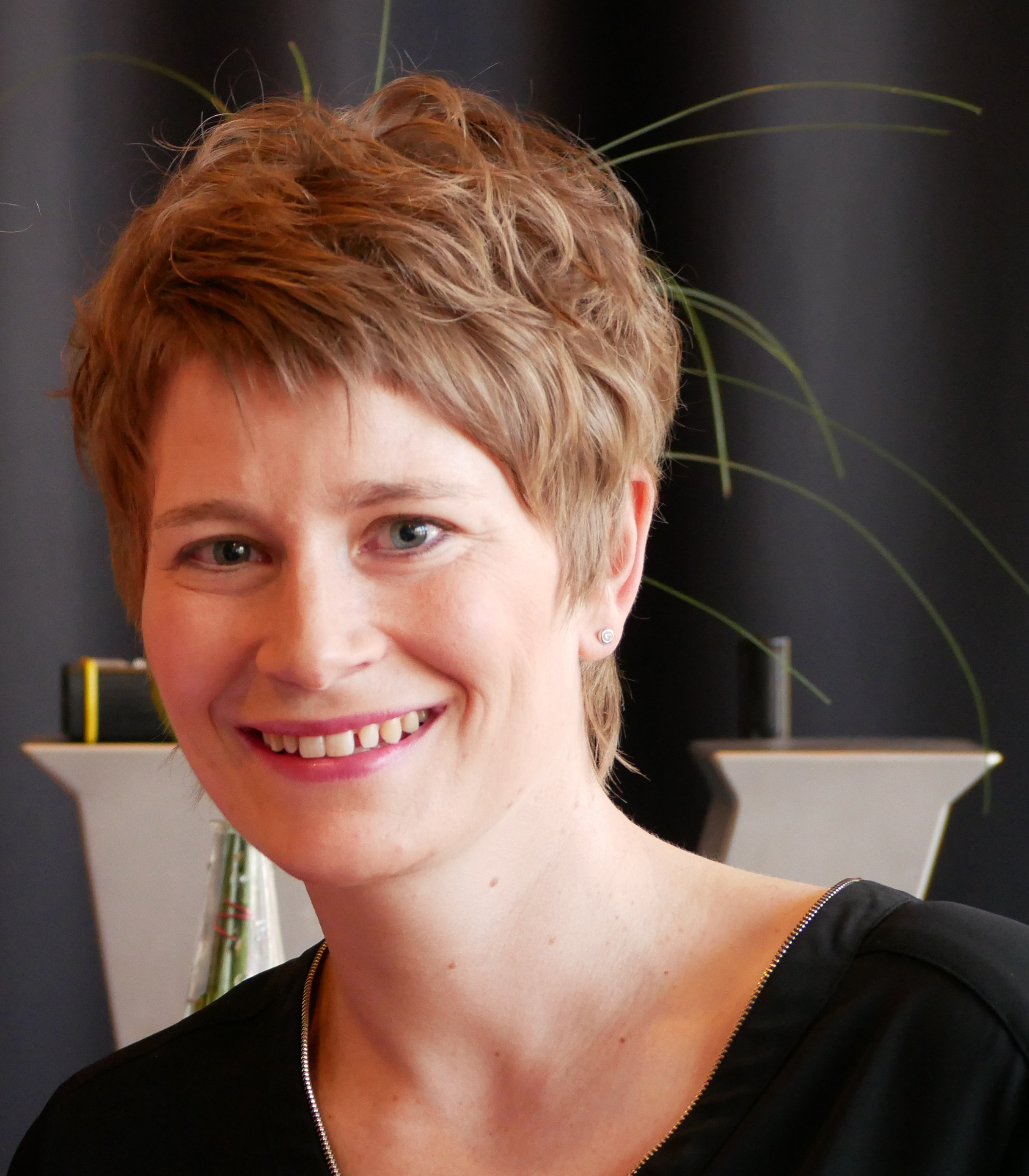
Anja Bihlmaier in 2018

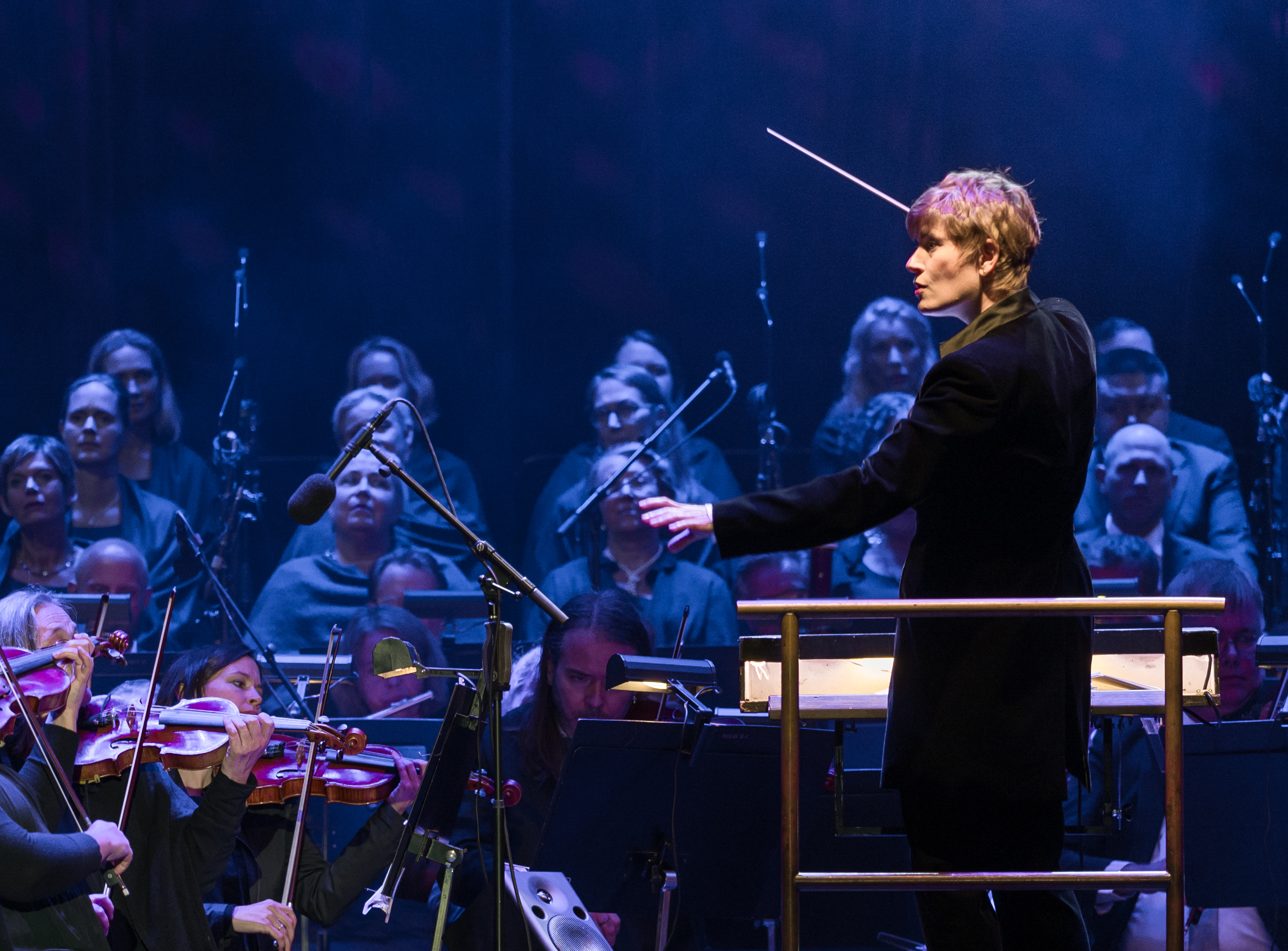
Anja Bihlmaier during Stockholm's cultural festival 2019. With the Kungliga Hovkapellet and The Royal Opera Choir from the Royal Swedish Opera.

Anja Bihlmaier (born 11 October 1978) is a German conductor. Bihlmaier played the piano and violin before studying conducting. From 2006 to 2010, Bihlmaier worked as a repetiteur at the Theater Coburg, at the Theater Görlitz, and at the Theater für Niedersachsen Hildesheim. From 2010 to 2013, Bihlmaier worked at the Theater Chemnitz as Zweite Kapellmeisterin (Second Kapellmeister) and assistant to the GMD (Generalmusikdirektor). From 2013 to 2015, she was Zweite Kapellmeisterin of the Staatsoper Hannover. From 2015 to 2018, Bihlmaier served as Erste Kapellmeisterin (First Kapellmeister) and deputy GMD of the Staatstheater Kassel.

== Early life and education ==
Bihlmaier was born in Schwäbisch Gmünd. Her parents sang in a church choir, and she learned the recorder as a youth. She later studied piano and violin. Her teachers included Roland Baldini, Johannes Pfitzer and Volker Stenzl. She continued piano studies with Elza Kolodin at the Staatliche Hochschule für Musik Freiburg, from which she graduated in 2003.

Bihlmaier studied conducting with Scott Sandmeier at the Hochschule für Musik Freiburg, and earned a conducting diploma in 2006. From 2004 to 2005, she held a conducting scholarship at the Mozarteum Salzburg, where she was a pupil of Dennis Russell Davies and Jorge Rotter. From 2005 to 2008, she was part of the Conductors' Forum of the German Music Council, and participated in conducting masterclasses with Sian Edwards, Peter Gülke, Günther Herbig, Gunter Kahlert, Kenneth Kiesler, Klauspeter Seibel and Jac van Steen. Other conducting mentors have included Kirk Trevor, Tsung Yeh, Giordano Bellincampi, Karen Kamensek and Antony Hermus.

== Career ==
From 2006 to 2010, Bihlmaier worked as a repetiteur at the Theater Coburg, at the Theater Görlitz, and at the Theater für Niedersachsen Hildesheim. From 2010 to 2013, Bihlmaier worked at the Theater Chemnitz as Zweite Kapellmeisterin (Second Kapellmeister) and assistant to the GMD (Generalmusikdirektor). From 2013 to 2015, she was Zweite Kapellmeisterin of the Staatsoper Hannover. From 2015 to 2018, Bihlmaier served as Erste Kapellmeisterin (First Kapellmeister) and deputy GMD of the Staatstheater Kassel. She was the second titled female conductor in the history of the Staatstheater Kassel.

In July 2017, Bihlmaier conducted the St Margarethen Opera Festival production of Rigoletto, the first female conductor in the festival's history. In November 2018, Bihlmaier first-guest conducted the Residentie Orchestra (Residentie Orkest). She first guest-conducted the Lahti Symphony Orchestra in December 2018. In May 2019, the Residentie Orkest announced the appointment of Bihlmaier as its next chief conductor, effective with the 2021–2022 season. This appointment marks her first chief conductorship. Bihlmaier is the first female conductor to be named chief conductor of the Residentie Orkest, and the second female conductor to be named chief conductor of any Dutch orchestra. In September 2019, the Lahti Symphony Orchestra announced the appointment of Bihlmaier as its next principal guest conductor, effective with the 2020–2021 season, with an initial contract of 3 seasons. She is the first female conductor named to the Lahti post. In December 2023, the Residentie Orchestra announced that Bihlmaier is to stand down as its chief conductor at the close of the 2024–2025 season.

In the UK, Bihlmaier first guest-conducted the BBC Philharmonic in February 2022. Bihlmaier returned to the BBC Philharmonic for three subsequent guest-conducting appearances, including her debut at The Proms in July 2023. In August 2024, the BBC Philharmonic announced the appointment of Bihlmaier as its next principal guest conductor, the first female conductor ever to be named to the post, effective in September 2024, with an initial contract of three seasons. Bihlmaier first guest-conducted at Glyndebourne Festival Opera in August 2024. On 29 August 2024, Bihlmaier conducted Georges Bizet's Carmen at the BBC Proms, the first female conductor ever to conduct the annual Glyndebourne Festival Opera Prom.

Cultural offices
Preceded by Nicholas Collon	Chief Conductor, Residentie Orchestra; 2021–2025	Succeeded by Jun Märkl
