= Jean Martinon =

French conductor and composer

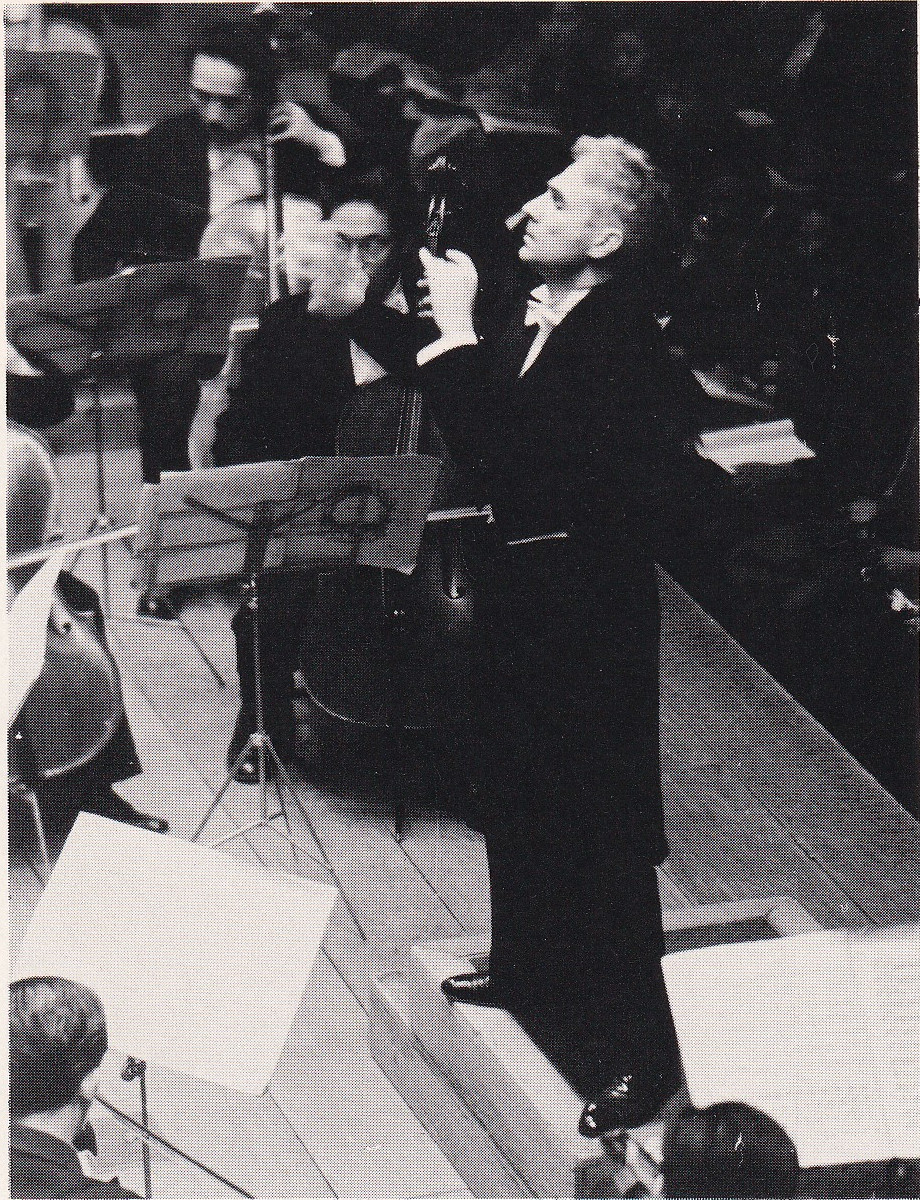
Jean Martinon

Jean Francisque-Étienne Martinon (also known as Jean Martinon (French pronunciation: [ʒɑ̃ maʁtinɔ̃]); 10 January 1910 – 1 March 1976) was a French conductor and composer.

== Biography ==
Martinon was born in Lyon, where he began his education, going on to the Conservatoire de Paris to study under Albert Roussel for composition, under Charles Munch and Roger Désormière for conducting, under Vincent d'Indy for harmony, and under Jules Boucherit for violin. He served in the French army during World War II, and was taken prisoner in 1940, composing works such as Chant des captifs while incarcerated. Among his other compositions are four symphonies, four concertos, additional choral works and chamber music.

After the war, Martinon was appointed conductor of the Orchestre de la Société des Concerts du Conservatoire of Paris, and, in 1946, of the Orchestre National Bordeaux Aquitaine.

On Martinon's first visit to Dublin in March 1946, his interpretation of Claude Debussy's La Mer (the Irish premiere of the work) was described as ‘a musical event of real importance’. The success of that first concert led Radio Éireann (the Irish public broadcasting service) to engage him in the following year to assist in the selection of musicians and the general organisation of the newly constituted Radio Éireann Symphony Orchestra. While in Dublin Martinon encouraged the development of Our Lady's Choral Society, he conducted that choir in several important events with the radio orchestra, and he gave master classes in orchestral conducting and in composition in the Summer School of Music.

Other orchestras with which he was associated were the Chicago Symphony Orchestra as music director from 1963 to 1968; the Düsseldorfer Symphoniker, the French National Orchestra, the Israel Philharmonic Orchestra, the London Philharmonic Orchestra, the Concerts Lamoureux and Het Residentie Orkest in The Hague.

Martinon's repertoire focused on the works of early twentieth-century French and Russian composers. The premieres of his violin and cello concertos were given by Henryk Szeryng and Pierre Fournier respectively.

He was a National Patron of Delta Omicron, an international professional music fraternity.

Martinon was diagnosed with bone cancer not long after he guest-conducted the San Francisco Symphony in its first complete performances of Deryck Cooke's completion of Gustav Mahler's tenth symphony. He died in Paris.

== Compositions ==
Jean Martinon

- Published Scores | 1935-1974
  - Après ma journée faite Op.26, (1940)
  - Ballade du soldat incassable Op.40 No.2, (1945)
  - Concerto (No.1) "giocoso" pour violon et orchestre Op.18, (1937)
  - Concerto "lyrique" pour un quatuor a cordes solo et un orchestre de 36 musiciens, Op.38, (1962)
  - Concerto pour flute et orchestre, (1971)
  - Concerto pour quatuor de saxophones Op.38b, (1974)
  - Concerto pour violoncelle et orchestre, Op.52, (1967)
  - Concerto No.2 pour violon et orchestre, Op.51, (1963)
  - Divertissement pour orchestre -reduit-, (1942)
  - Doménon, ou, Musique pour quintette à vent, (1970)
  - Duo -musique en forme de sonate- pour violon et piano Op.47, (1959)
  - Epilogue d'un conte d'amour -berceuse- pour piano, Op.35 No.1, (1947)
  - Les horizons perdus pour chant et piano, (1946)
  - Humanité (Les Soirs) pour chant et piano Op.12, (1940)
  - Hymne, variations et rondo Op.56, (1961/1968)
  - Introduction et toccata Op.45, (1947)
  - Mon plus joli rêve, (1946?)
  - Musique d'exil, Op.31, (1941)
  - Ouverture pour tragédie grecque Op.47, (1951)
  - Paysage antérieur pour chant et piano, Op.25 No.1, (1940)
  - Psaume CXXXVI (Chant des captifs), Op.33, (1946)
  - Psaume 136 (Chant des captifs) pour chant et piano avec choeurs, Op.33, (1946)
  - Quatuor a cordes No.1 Op.43, (1946)
  - Quatuor a cordes No.2 Op.54, (1966)
  - Rapsodie 72 pour alto et piano, (1972)
  - Sonatine No.1 pour violin et piano Op.19 No.1, (1935)
  - Sonatine (No.1) vers. pour clarinette et piano Op.19 No.1b, (1935/1968)
  - Sonatine No.2 pour violin et piano Op.19 No.2, (1936)
  - Sonatine (No.2) vers. pour flute et piano Op.19 No.2b, (1936/1968)
  - Sonatine No.3 pour piano, Op.22, (1946?)
  - Sonatine No.4 pour trio d'anches Op.26 No.1, (1940)
  - Sonatine No.5 pour violon solo, Op.32 No.1, (1942)
  - Sonatine No.6 pour violon solo, Op.49 No.2, (1960)
  - Sonatine "a la lune qui s'en va" pour chant et piano, Op.10 No.3, (1946?)
  - Suite nocturne pour violin et piano Op.34, (1944)
  - Symphoniette pour orchestre à cordes, piano, harpe, et timbales, (1952)
  - Symphonie No.3 "Irlandaise" Op.45, (1948)
  - Symphonie No.4 "Altitudes" Op.53, (1965)
  - Trio a cordes Op.32 No.2, (1943)
  - Trois chansons Op.20, (1938)
- Unpublished Scores | 1935-1975
  - Absolve, Domine -motet- pour 4 voix d'hommes et orchestre spécial, Op.30, (1942)
  - Ambohimanga, ou La cité bleue -ballet radiophonique-, Op.42, (1949)
  - Appel de parfums -chœur- à 4 voix d'hommes, Op.28 No.2, (1941)
  - 183eme Concerto - Parodic composition written for violinist André Proffit's 40th birthday-, (1943)
  - Concerto giocoso pour violon et orchestre, Op.18, (1937)
  - Concerto "lyrique", Op.38a, (1944)
  - Concerto pour alto Op.18b, (1937)
  - Concerto pour cello et orchestre Op.52, (1963)
  - Concerto pour flute et orchestre, (1971)
  - Concerto pour quatuor de saxophones, (1974)
  - Concerto No.2 pour violon et orchestre Op.51, (1958)
  - Déchiffrage pour hautbois, n.d.
  - Fanfare en rondo Op.40, (1946)
  - Hécube Op.46, (1949)
  - Hymne variation et rondo, (1961/1968)
  - Introduzione adagio et passacaglia Op.55, (1966)
  - Le lis de Saron ou le cantique de cantiques Op.48, (1952)
  - Motet pour quatre voix mixtes Op.28 No.4, (1940)
  - Octour Op.57, (1969)
  - Ode au soleil ne de la mort, (1945)
  - Prélude et toccata, Op.50, (1961)
  - En promenade, n.d.
  - Quatuor a cordes No.1 Op.43, (1946)
  - Rapsodie 72 pour alto et piano Op.60, (1971)
  - Romance bleue -rapsodie de concert- pour violon solo et orchestre, (1942)
  - Sonatine brève, (1965)
  - Sonatine pour clarinette et piano, (1972)
  - Suite enchainée pour 11 cordes et clavecin, (1975)
  - Suite nocturne pour violon et piano, Op.34, (1946)
  - Symphonie en ut Op.17, (1934/1936)
  - Symphonie No.2 "Hymne a la Vie" Op.37, (1944)
  - Symphonie No.3 "Irlandaise" Op.45, (1948)
  - Symphonie No.4 "Altitudes" (originaux) Op.53, (1965)
  - Symphonie No.4 "Altitudes" (corrections) Op.53, (1965)
  - Symphonie No.4 "Altitudes" (new coda final) Op.53, (1965)
  - Symphonie de voyages Op.49 No.1, (1956)
  - Symphoniette Op.16, (1935)
  - Trio a cordes Op.32 No.2, (1943)
  - Trois nouvelles chansons Op.36, (1968)
  - Vigintour No.1 Op.58, (1968)
- Scores (Arrangements) | 1946-1969
  - Grande fugue, (1969)
  - Magnificat, n.d.
  - Moto perpetuo, n.d.
  - Sérénade, (1946)

Cultural offices
Preceded by Paul Paray	Music Director, Israel Philharmonic Orchestra; 1957-1959	Succeeded by Zubin Mehta
Preceded by Eugène Bigot	Principal Conductor, Lamoureux Orchestra; 1957-1961	Succeeded by Igor Markevitch
Preceded by Fritz Reiner	Music Director, Chicago Symphony Orchestra; 1963-1969	Succeeded by Irwin Hoffman
Preceded by Willem van Otterloo	Principal Conductor, Het Residentie Orkest; 1975-1976	Succeeded by Ferdinand Leitner
