= Ferdinand Leitner =

German conductor (1912 - 1996)

- Ferdinand Leitner (photo with 1960 dedication)
- Occupation: conductor

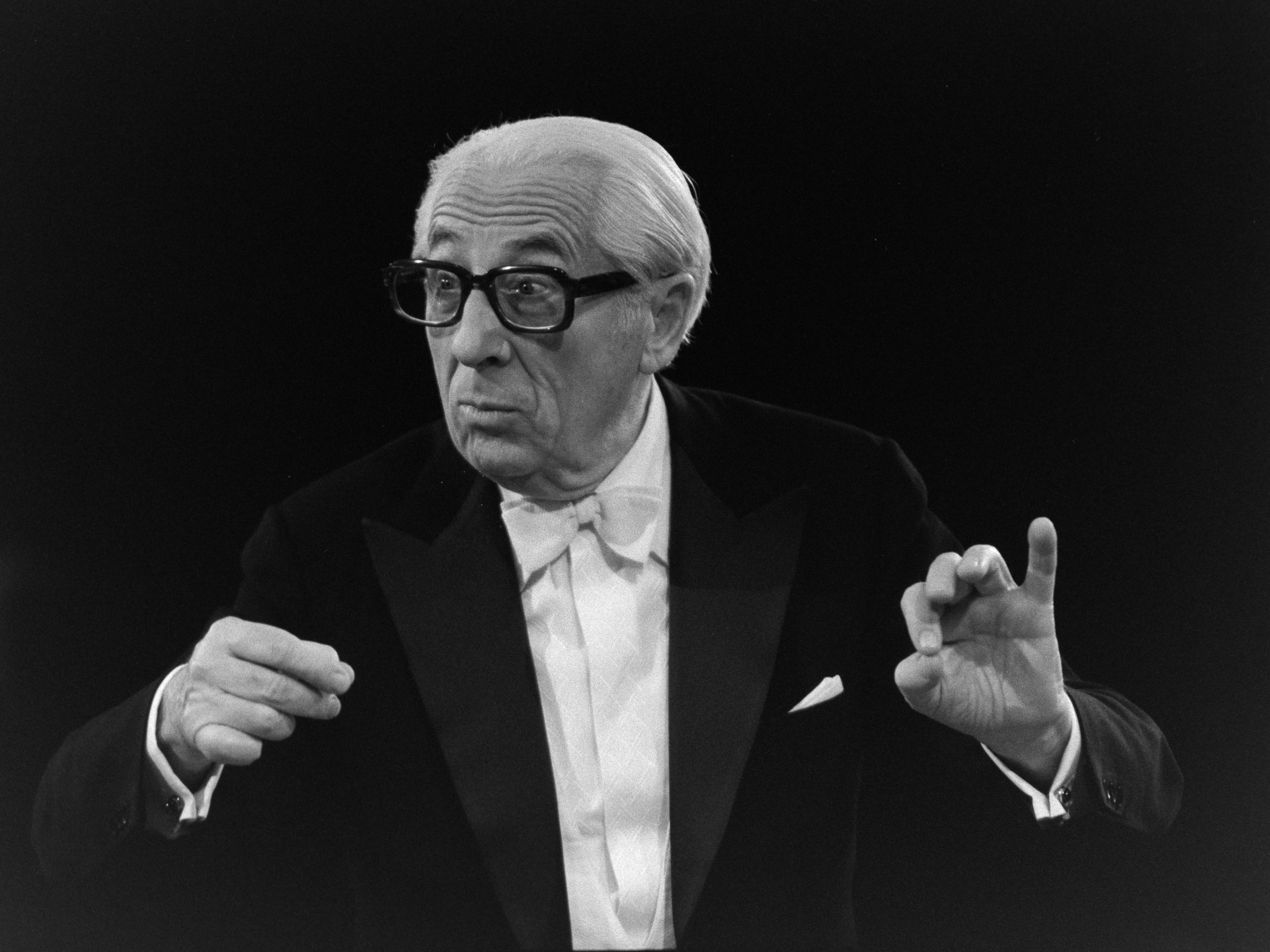
The German conductor Ferdinand Leitner rehearsing with the Bamberg Symphony orchestra.

Ferdinand Leitner (4 March 1912 in Berlin – 3 June 1996 in Zürich) was a German conductor. Leitner studied under Franz Schreker, Julius Prüwer, Artur Schnabel and Karl Muck.

He also was a composition student with Robert Kahn. Starting as a pianist, through the help of Fritz Busch, he became a conductor in the 1930s. He was conductor of the Nollendorfplatz Theater in Berlin from 1943 to 1945; in Hanover from 1945 to 1946; in Munich from 1946 to 1947; and the general music director of the Württemberg State Opera house (German "Staatstheater Stuttgart") in Stuttgart from 1947 until 1969. To honour him, the city of Stuttgart has named a pedestrian bridge, that connects the Upper part (where the Staatstheater is located) and the Central part of the "Schlossgarten" (castle) park, after him (Ferdinand-Leitner-Steg).

He is famous as a conductor of opera, his favourite composers being Wagner, Richard Strauss, Mozart, and twentieth-century composers Carl Orff and Karl Amadeus Hartmann. He succeeded Erich Kleiber in 1956 as conductor for the Teatro Colón in Buenos Aires. From 1976 to 1980, he worked in The Hague as principal conductor of Het Residentie Orkest.

Among his more than 300 recordings is a recording of Busoni's Doktor Faust. He also conducted the Berlin Philharmonic for Wilhelm Kempff's 1961 cycle of Beethoven's piano concertos.

== Students ==
His students include Matthias Manasi.

| Preceded by Jean Martinon | Principal Conductor, Het Residentie Orkest; 1976–1980 | Succeeded by Hans Vonk |
