= Aurora Orchestra =

UK chamber orchestra

- Chamber orchestra
- Founded: 2004
- Location: London, United Kingdom
- Principal conductor: Nicholas Collon
- Website: auroraorchestra.com

Aurora Orchestra is a British chamber orchestra, co-founded in 2004 by conductors Nicholas Collon and Robin Ticciati. The orchestra is based in London, where it is Resident Orchestra at Southbank Centre and Resident Ensemble at Kings Place. The orchestra was also previously Associate Orchestra at LSO St Luke's, and performs regularly at other venues including St George's, Bristol, the Colyer-Fergusson Hall in Canterbury, and The Apex in Bury St Edmunds. It has developed a particular reputation for creative programming and concert presentation, including pioneering memorised performance as a regular feature of its artistic output. Since its launch in 2005, it has worked with artists ranging from Ian Bostridge, Brett Dean, Anthony Marwood and Sarah Connolly to Edmund de Waal, Wayne McGregor and Björk.

== History ==
In 2004, Nicholas Collon, Robin Ticciati and fellow members of the National Youth Orchestra established Aurora, which gave its first public performance in 2005. In March 2011, the Arts Council of England included Aurora Orchestra in its new "national portfolio" scheme. Aurora, which had not been a "regularly funded organisation" under the council's previous funding scheme, was awarded this support as one of the "smaller adventurous music ensembles".

Aurora Orchestra first appeared at The Proms in family-themed concerts in 2011 and 2012. The orchestra subsequently returned for late-night Proms in 2013 and in 2014, the latter of which featured the premiere of Meld by Benedict Mason. In this and subsequent appearances at The Proms, the orchestra featured major classical works performed entirely from memory:

- 2014: Symphony No 40 by Mozart
- 2015: Symphony No 6 by Beethoven
- 2016: Symphony No 41 by Mozart
- 2017: Symphony No 3 by Beethoven
- 2018: Symphony No 9 by Shostakovich
- 2019: Symphonie fantastique by Berlioz
- 2020: Symphony No 7 by Beethoven
- 2021: The Firebird by Stravinsky
- 2022: Symphony No 5 by Beethoven
- 2023: The Rite of Spring by Stravinsky
- 2024: Symphony No. 9 by Beethoven
- 2025: Symphony No. 5 by Shostakovich
- 2026: Symphony No. 1 by Mahler

John Harte has been chief executive of Aurora Orchestra since 2009. Harte is scheduled to stand down from the post in July 2026.

== Recordings ==
In June 2011, the Aurora Orchestra's debut album of Nico Muhly's Seeing Is Believing was released. The orchestra has also made commercial albums for Warner Classics, and other albums including:

- This Is the Day (2012), conducted by John Rutter, produced by Thomas Hewitt Jones and released on Collegium Records (COLCD 136)
- Introit: The Music of Gerald Finzi (2016), conducted by Nicholas Collon, produced by Alexander Van Ingen and released on Decca Classics (DECCA 4789357)

== Awards ==
In May 2011, Aurora won the Ensemble category of the annual Royal Philharmonic Society Music Awards for calendar year 2010.
