= Paul van Kempen =

Dutch conductor

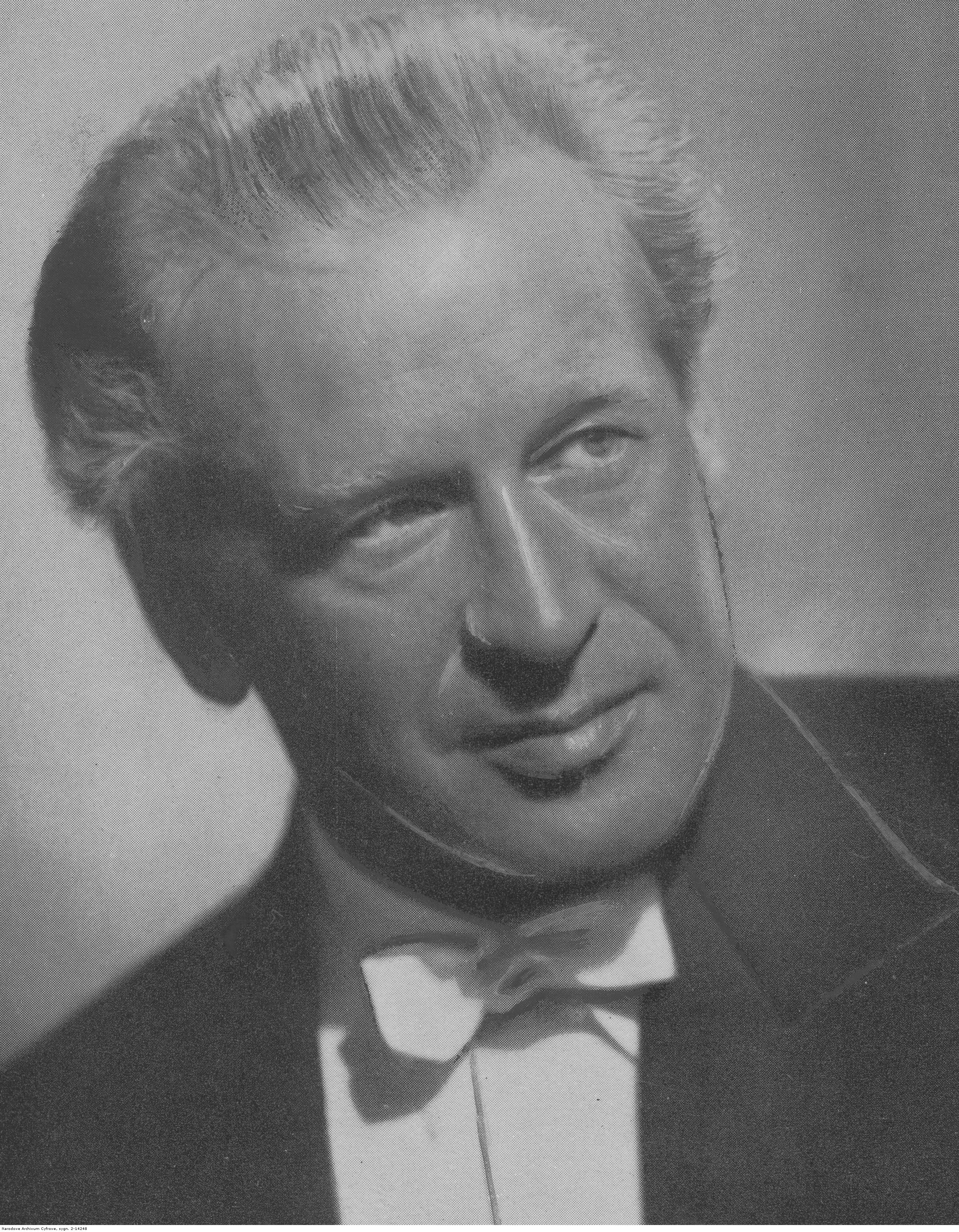
- Paul van Kempen in 1940
- Born: 16 May 1893; Zoeterwoude, Netherlands
- Died: 8 December 1955 (aged 62); Amsterdam
- Occupation: conductor

Paul van Kempen (16 May 1893 – 8 December 1955) was a Dutch conductor.

== Personal life ==
Van Kempen was born in Zoeterwoude, Netherlands. He studied at the Amsterdam conservatory from 1910 to 1913, including composition and conducting with Julius Roentgen and Bernard Zweers, as well as violin with Louis Zimmerman. From 1913, he was a second violinist with the Concertgebouw Orchestra. One year later, he was in the first violin section. After 1916, he began to make his career more in Germany, and served as concertmaster in orchestras in Posen, Bad Nauheim und Dortmund. In 1932, Van Kempen became a German citizen. He died in Amsterdam at age 62.

== Career ==
Van Kempen was music director in Oberhausen for 2 years. From 1934 to 1942, he was principal conductor of the Dresden Philharmonic. In 1942, he succeeded Herbert von Karajan as Kapellmeister in Aachen, serving until 1944. Several years after World War II, in 1953, Van Kempen became general music director of the city of Bremen.

In 1949, Van Kempen returned to the Netherlands as principal conductor of the Netherlands Radio Philharmonic Orchestra, based in Hilversum. However, his conducting activities during World War II, such as conducting concerts for the Wehrmacht, made him a controversial figure in the Netherlands. On one occasion, in 1951, Van Kempen was engaged as a substitute conductor at the Concertgebouw Orchestra in place of the ill Eduard van Beinum. During the first night, audience members protested strongly, but the concert took place. On the second night, the audience disruptions were so severe that 62 musicians left the stage and refused to continue.

Van Kempen recordings included the Beethoven Symphonies Nos. 3, 7 and 8 with the Berlin Philharmonic, Nos 2 and 5 with the Dresden Philharmonic, the five Beethoven piano concertos with Wilhelm Kempff and the Berlin P.O., and the Tchaikovsky Symphonies Nos. 5 and 6 with Amsterdam Royal Concertgebouw. He conducted the Orchestre des Concerts Lamoureux on an EPIC recording, LC 3349, year unknown, of Rossini: William Tell Overture and Barber Of Seville Overture, and Donizetti: Daughter of the Regiment Overture. On the same recording he also conducted the Concertgebouw Orchestra of Amsterdam on Tchaikovsky: Marche slave, Op.31, Strauss, Sr: Radetsky March, Op. 228, and Schubert: Marche militaire in D Major, Op. 51, No. 1. He recorded von Weber's Oberon Overture with the Radio-Philharmonische Orchester Hilvesum in 1953 on Philips S06003 R.

== Literature ==
- Kees de Leeuw: Dirigeren is geen beroep maar roeping. Leven en werk van Paul van Kempen (1893-1955). Uitg. Gopher, Amsterdam, 2007. 269 p. ISBN 978-90-5179-487-8 (Dutch)

Cultural offices
Preceded by Albert van Raalte	Principal Conductor, Netherlands Radio Philharmonic Orchestra; 1949–1955	Succeeded by Bernard Haitink
