= Albert van Raalte =

Dutch conductor (1890–1952)

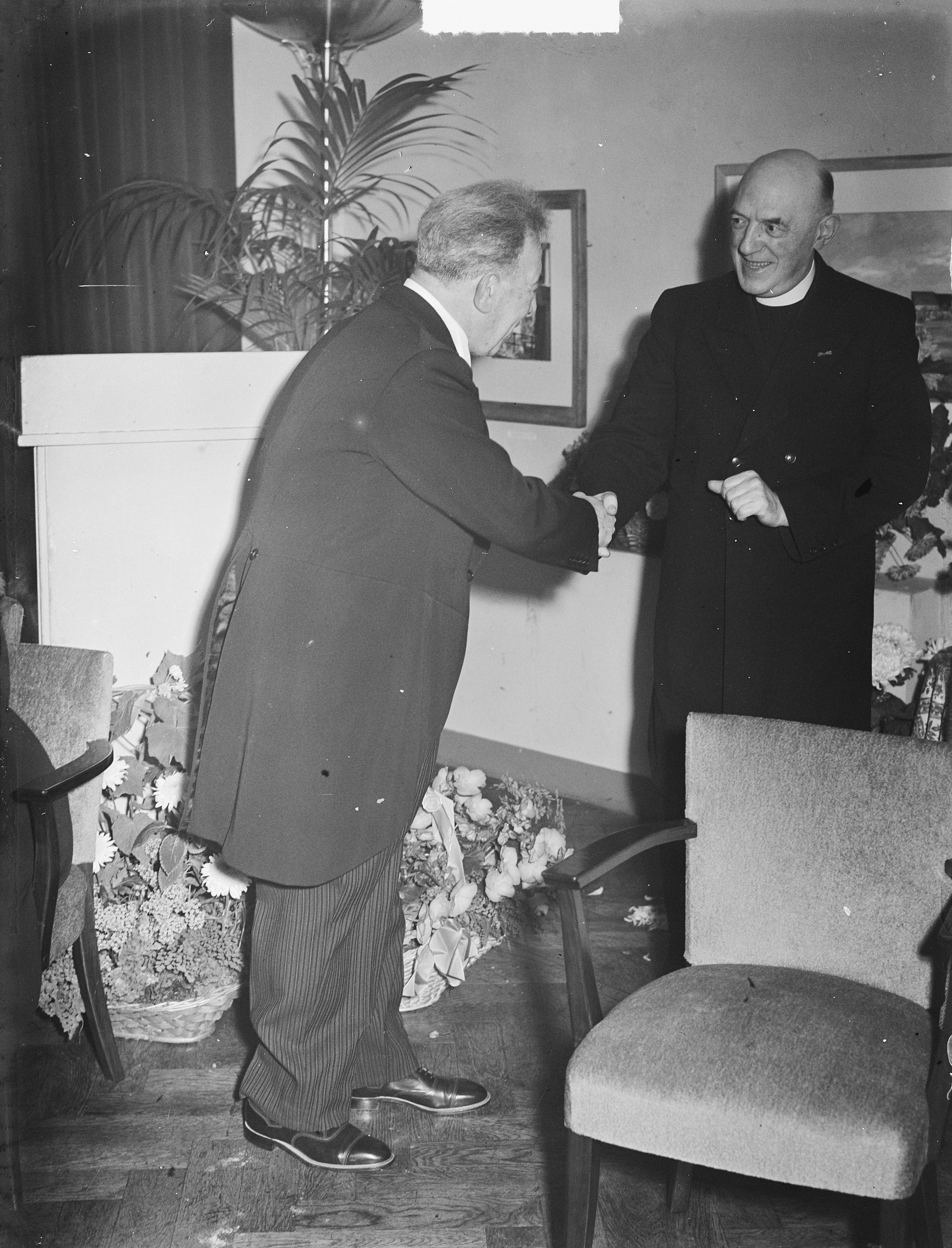
Albert van Raalte (left)

Albert Bernhard van Raalte (21 May 1890, Amsterdam – 23 November 1952) was a Dutch conductor, the son of Izak van Raalte and Carolina van Engel. He began music studies at age 7, from such teachers as Herman Meerlo and Arnold Drilsma (both violin), and J.W. Kersbergen (piano).

From 1906 to 1909, van Raalte studied at the Hochschule für Musik Köln, where his teachers included Fritz Steinbach (conducting), Bram Eldering (violin), Lazzaro Uzielli (piano), and Waldemar von Baussern (harmony and counterpoint). He later pursued further studies in music theory with Max Reger and in conducting with Bruno Walter and Camille Saint-Saëns. His conducting career began with a 1909 concert at the Musikalische Gesellschaft in Cologne. In 1911–1912, he was a répétiteur at La Monnaie (Brussels). He worked as an opera conductor in Germany and the Netherlands from 1912 until the outbreak of World War II.

From 1928 to 1940, van Raalte conducted concerts on Dutch radio (AVRO), until his dismissal during World War II. After the war, from 1945 to 1949, he served as the first principal conductor of the Radio Filharmonisch Orkest. He also undertook guest conducting opportunities, such as with the Scottish [National] Orchestra.

Van Raalte married Helena Wilhelmina Sophia Horneman on 23 July 1918. The couple had one son.

Cultural offices
Preceded by (no predecessor)	Principal Conductor, Radio Filharmonisch Orkest; 1945-1949	Succeeded by Paul van Kempen
