= Pulse (Reich) =

2015 composition by Steve Reich

Pulse is a 2015 work by American composer Steve Reich. The work is scored for woodwinds, strings, piano and electric bass guitar. In 2016 Nonesuch Records released an album consisting of Pulse and Reich's 2013 work Quartet.
