= Willem van Otterloo =

Dutch conductor and composer

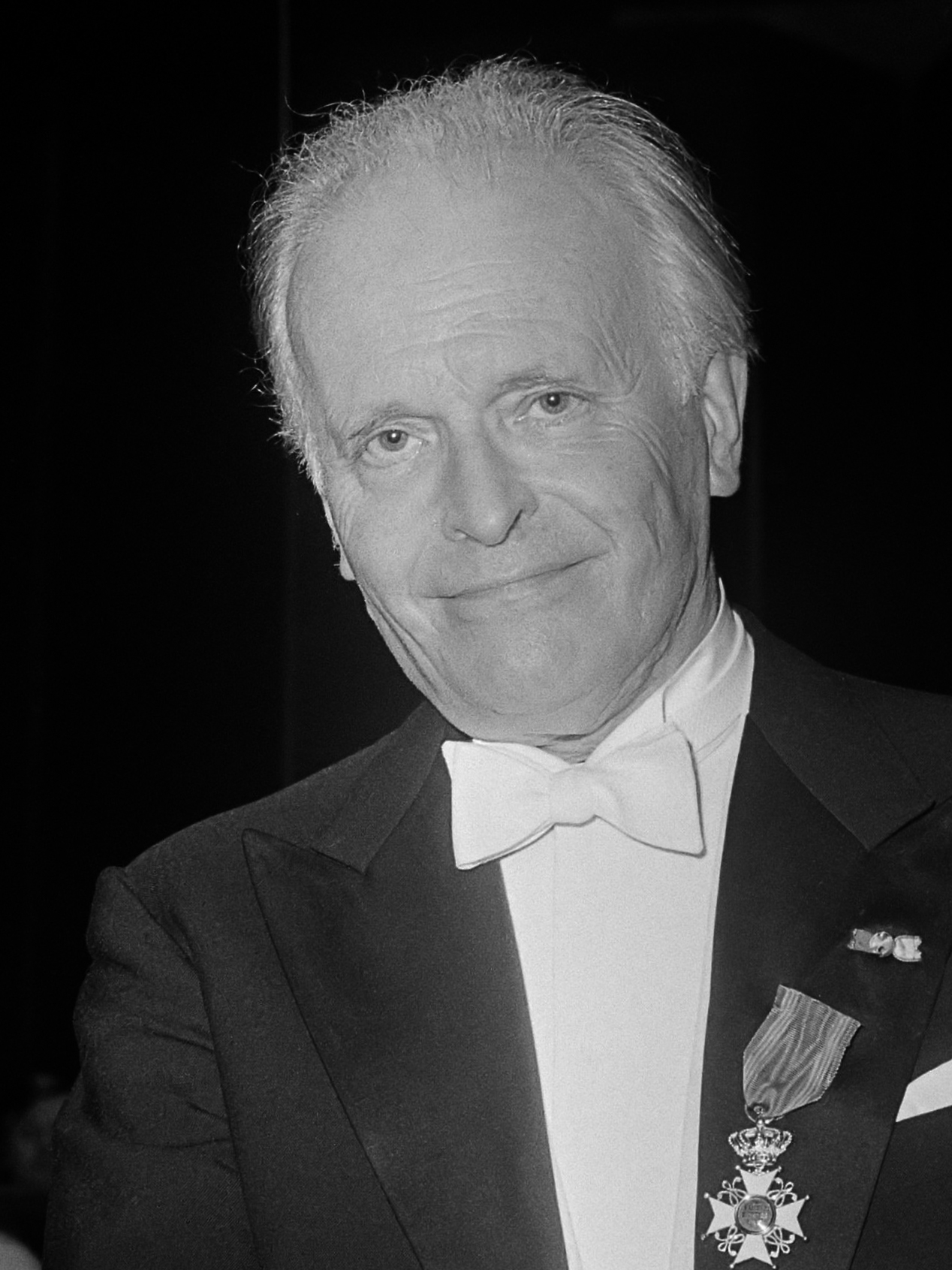
- van Otterloo in 1973
- Born: Jan Willem van Otterloo; 27 December 1907; Winterswijk, Netherlands
- Died: 27 July 1978 (aged 70); Melbourne, Australia
- Organizations: Residentie Orchestra; Sydney Symphony

Jan Willem van Otterloo (27 December 1907 – 27 July 1978) was a Dutch conductor, cellist and composer.

== Biography ==
Van Otterloo was born in Winterswijk, Gelderland, in the Netherlands, the son of William Frederik van Otterloo, a railway inspector, and his wife Anna Catharina van Otterloo (née Enderlé). He qualified to study medicine at Utrecht University but switched to studying cello and composition at the Amsterdam Conservatoire. While playing as a cellist in the Utrecht Stedelijk Orkest, he won a composition prize from the Concertgebouw Orchestra for his Suite No. 3, which he presented in his 1932 conducting debut, also with that orchestra. He held posts with the Utrecht Stedelijk Orkest, before being appointed chief conductor of the Residentie Orkest in The Hague (1949–1973).

He spent his last 11 years in Australia. From 1967 to 1968 he was chief conductor of the Melbourne Symphony Orchestra and in 1971 he was appointed chief conductor of the Sydney Symphony Orchestra, where he remained for the rest of his life.

Particularly prized for his performances of 19th and 20th-century music, he made numerous commercial recordings, mostly for Philips Records, with Residentie Orkest, Concertgebouworkest, Berlin Philharmonic, Vienna Philharmonic, Vienna Symphony, Orchestre Lamoureux and (on much rarer occasions) the Sydney Symphony.

He died in the Melbourne suburb of East St Kilda in 1978 from injuries suffered in an automobile accident. His body was flown to The Hague for cremation.

His notable students include Graham George and Miroslav Miletić.

== Personal life ==
Van Otterloo was married and divorced four times in the Netherlands. He married Elisabeth ter Hoeve on 1 August 1935 (divorce 1938). On 22 April 1941 he married Anette Jacoba Adriana Heukers, with whom in December of that year he had a son, Rogier van Otterloo (1941–1988), who would become a well-known conductor in the Netherlands as well. He and Anette divorced in April 1943, but remarried 28 April 1944. They would have another son and two daughters, but divorced again on 20 September 1954. Ten days later he married Susanne Maria Anna Wildmann with whom he had another daughter. A month after his fourth divorce, he married Carola Gertie Ludewig (born 1945) on 12 August 1970 in Australia.

== Compositions ==
- Suite (1938)
- Symphoniëtta for 16 Wind Instruments (1943)
- Serenade (1944)

== Discography ==
- Willem Van Otterloo and Residentie Orkest: The Original Recordings 1950–1960. 13 CDs. Challenge Classics, CC 72142
- von Weber's Der Freischütz overture with the Residentie Orchestra in 1951 on Philips S 06003 R.

Cultural offices
Preceded by Frits Schuurman	Principal Conductor, Residentie Orkest; 1949–1973	Succeeded by Jean Martinon
