= Atsiagbekor =

Ewe war dance

Atsiagbekor is a traditional war dance of the Ewe people, originating in Ghana's Volta Region and extending to Togo and Benin. Historically performed to celebrate military victories, the dance reflects the bravery and strategic unity of Ewe warriors and their communities. In modern contexts, Atsiagbekor has evolved into a form of cultural expression performed at social events, festivals, and educational platforms.

== Historical and cultural context ==
Atsiagbekor traces its origins to the war dance Atamga, which commemorated warriors' triumphs and embodied strategic battle formations. The term "Atsiagbekor" translates roughly to "life display through drumming," emphasizing the connection between rhythm, movement, and community solidarity.

The dance was traditionally performed in platoon formations, reflecting reconnaissance, surprise attacks, and combat maneuvers. The Atimavu (master drum) leads the ensemble of drummers, dancers, and singers, creating a polyrhythmic interplay that mirrors the communal ethos of Ewe society.

== Performance and structure ==
Atsiagbekor performances are structured into slow and fast sections. The slow section symbolizes preparation and stealth, while the fast section represents the intensity of battle. Each movement in the dance corresponds to rhythmic cues from the lead drum. Call-and-response chants between leaders and participants further emphasize the communal nature of the performance.

Costumes play a significant role in Atsiagbekor performances. Traditionally, dancers wore garments made from raffia, symbolic of readiness for battle. Contemporary costumes incorporate modern materials while retaining elements that signify the dance's martial origins and cultural identity. Accessories like cowries and red cloths add symbolic depth, representing protection and valor.

== Contemporary adaptations ==
Today, Atsiagbekor is performed at social gatherings, cultural festivals, and educational institutions. The Ghana Dance Ensemble, affiliated with the University of Ghana, has played a pivotal role in preserving and showcasing the dance on global stages. Their performances highlight the intricate relationship between its music, choreography, and cultural narratives.

Educational centers such as the Dagbe Cultural Center offer training in Atsiagbekor, teaching students its movements, rhythms, and historical significance. These efforts ensure the preservation and adaptation of the dance for future generations.

== Symbolism ==
The symbolism of Atsiagbekor lies in its connection to the values of bravery, solidarity, and communal effort. Costumes and movements convey specific meanings, such as the red cloth symbolizing blood and sacrifice and the cowries representing wealth and protection. The dance, therefore, functions as a living archive of Ewe history and values.
