= Peter van Anrooy =

Dutch composer and conductor (1879–1954)

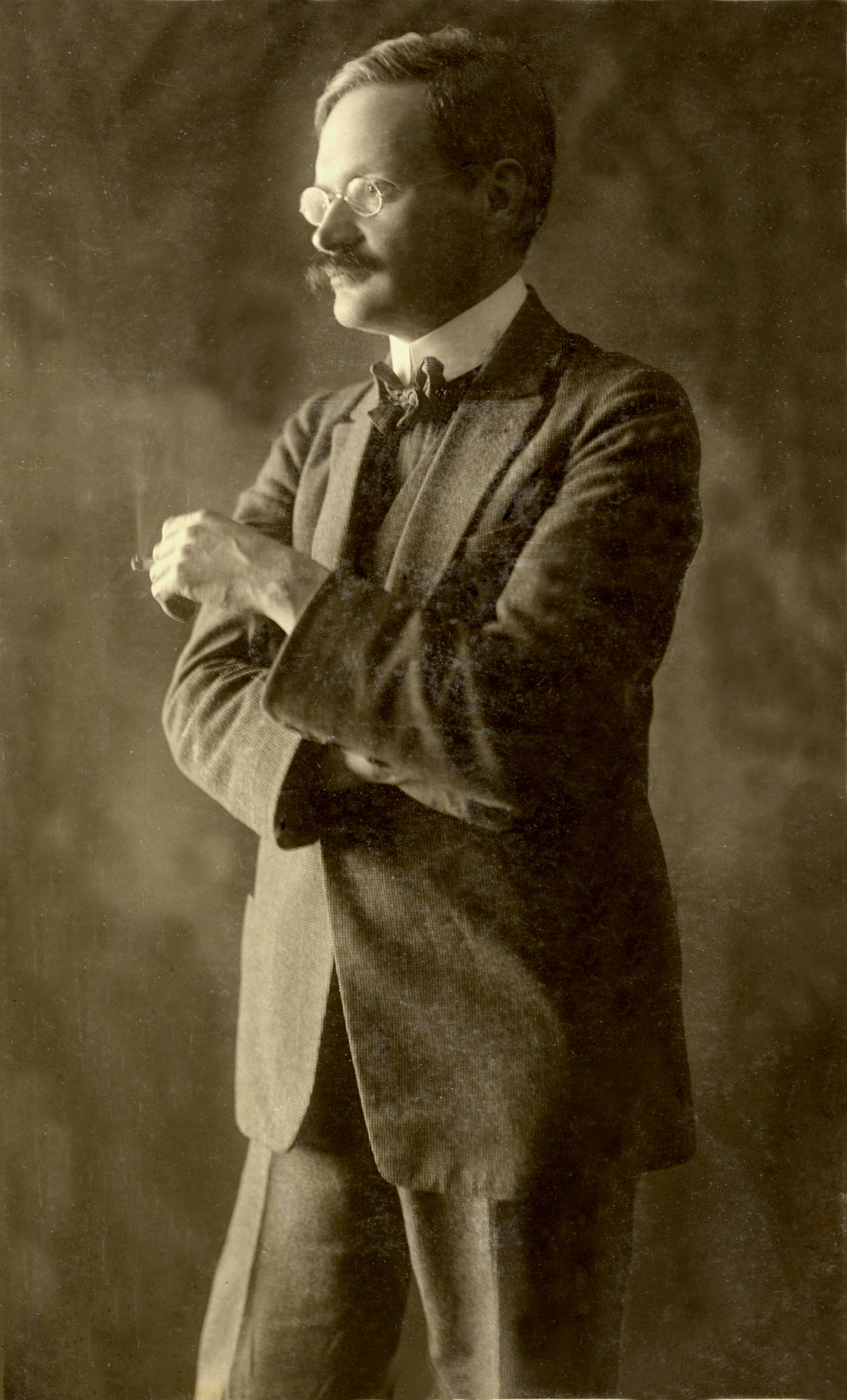
- Peter van Anrooy ca. 1917
- Born: 13 October 1879; Zaltbommel, the Netherlands
- Died: 31 December 1954 (aged 75); The Hague, the Netherlands

Peter Gijsbert van Anrooij (13 October 1879 – 31 December 1954) was a Dutch composer and conductor of classical music.

== Biography ==
Van Anrooy was born in Zaltbommel to Peter Gijsbert van Anrooij, an apothecary, and Jozefa Helena Maria Pool. The family soon moved to Utrecht, where van Anrooy learned piano, violin and composition in a music school (1890–1899). Then for two years he studied conducting in Dresden and Moscow; in Moscow he also received lessons in counterpoint from Sergei Taneyev. After completing his studies, van Anrooy played violin with orchestras in Glasgow and Zurich and by 1905 returned to the Netherlands, where around 1905 he assumed the positions of conductor with the Groningen Orchestra and director of a music school. In Groningen he received an honorary PhD title in 1914. Van Anrooy continued conducting with various Dutch orchestras until 1940. While his early work mostly focused on classics such as Bach, Mozart, Beethoven, Debussy, Ravel, Mahler and Strauss, he later paid more attention to modern Dutch composers. He also composed himself, starting from a piano piece Mars voor piano vierhandig in 1891 and ending with variations on Dutch melodies in 1937. His most known composition is Piet Hein Rhapsodie voor symfonieorkest, which was based on the Dutch song De Zilvervloot (Spanish treasure fleet) by J.J. Viotta and J.P. Heije. After World War II, between 1947 and 1954 he broadcast a weekly educational radio program at AVRO on understanding classical music.

Van Anrooy had a strong character and was active politically. In 1933 he signed a document Bruinboek van de Hitler-terreur en de Rijksdagbrand (lit. Brown book of Hilter terror and the Reichstag fire) and as a result, his music was banned during the war. In 1937 he refused to conduct the Nazi song Horst-Wessel-Lied at the marriage of Prince Bernhard of Lippe-Biesterfeld and Juliana of the Netherlands.

On 29 November 1906 van Anrooy married Frederique Johanna Adolphina de l'Espinasse; they had two daughters.

== See also ==
- Anton van Anrooy
