= Netherlands Radio Chamber Philharmonic =

Dutch orchestra (2005–2013)

- Orchestra
- Native name: Nederlands Radio Kamer Filharmonie
- Short name: RKF
- Former name: Radio Kamer Orkest; Radio Symfonie Orkest
- Founded: 2005; 20 years ago
- Disbanded: 2013; 12 years ago
- Location: Amsterdam, Netherlands
- Concert hall: Concertgebouw.
- Principal conductor: Michael Schønwandt (2011)

The Nederlands Radio Kamer Filharmonie (RKF) was a Dutch orchestra active from 2005 to 2013. It was based at the Muziekcentrum van de Omroep (MCO) and performed concerts at the Amsterdam Concertgebouw.

== History ==
The orchestra was formed in 2005 as a merger of the Radio Kamer Orkest and some of the players of the Radio Symfonie Orkest (itself an earlier merger of the Omroep Orkest and the Promenade Orkest), though many of the functions and players of the RSO orchestra were instead merged into the Netherlands Radio Philharmonic.

Jaap van Zweden was the RKF's chief conductor from 2005 to 2010, and Michael Schønwandt was appointed chief conductor in 2011.

In July, 2013, the Dutch government announced a total cut in the RKF's funding, and the orchestra gave its final performance at the Concertgebouw on July 14.

== See also ==
- Netherlands Radio Philharmonic
