= Quartet (Reich) =

2013 composition by Steve Reich

Quartet is a 2013 work by American composer Steve Reich. The quartet of musical instruments of the work consists of two pianos and two vibraphones. In 2018, Nonesuch Records released an album consisting of Quartet performed by International Contemporary Ensemble and Pulse performed by Colin Currie Group.
