= Dave Maric =

British composer and musician (born 1970)

- Born: 12 June 1970; Bedford, England
- Education: City University, London
- Occupations: composer and musician
- Notable work: Key works

Dave Maric (born 12 June 1970) is a British composer and musician.

== Biography ==
Born in Bedford, England to Greek and Bosnian Serb immigrants, he moved to London in 1988 where he studied at City University. During the 1990s he regularly performed and recorded as a jazz and classical pianist with a number of new music ensembles including the London Sinfonietta and the Steve Martland Band. Since 2000 he has been regularly composing stylistically varied works for various instrumental combinations including music for classical soloists, chamber and orchestral ensembles and works for live performers with computer generated sound sources. Since 2010 his activities have broadened further to include curating music/art events regularly in London, and performing/recording with a range of new ensembles and bands including: Vicious Circus and the Colin Currie Group. Into the 2020s he has relocated to rural Scotland, broadening his experiences by also connecting directly to the biodiversity crisis through rewilding from both an artistic and a practical perspective.

Amongst the musicians that he has composed for are the percussionist Colin Currie, guitarist Fred Frith, contrabassist Mich Gerber, trumpeter Håkan Hardenberger, jazz trio Phronesis (band), pianists Katia and Marielle Labèque and violinist Viktoria Mullova. Many of his works have been choreographed to and he has created scores for a number of full evening dance pieces including adaptations of Ibsen's "Ghosts" for the Royal Opera House and Dickens' "A Tale of Two Cities" for Northern Ballet Theatre. He has also worked with Paris-based film makers Cserhati and Lartigue on scores for short and feature film projects.

A selection of his earlier works are published by Norsk Musikforlag A/S.

== Key works ==
- 2000 - Trilogy (for live and sampled percussion)
- 2001 - Falling to the Sky (for violin and piano)
- 2002 - Lifetimes (for string ensemble and percussion)
- 2002 - Exile (for two pianos, percussion and electronics)
- 2003 - Borrowed Time (for organ and percussion)
- 2004 - Spellbound (for band and orchestra)
- 2005 - Ghosts (contemporary dance score for chamber ensemble and recorded electronics)
- 2006 - Shore (contemporary dance score for voices, winds and percussion)
- 2006 - Lucid Intervals (for trumpet/flugelhorn and tuned percussion)
- 2008 - A Tale of Two Cities (ballet score for orchestra)
- 2009 - Sturmhöhe (Wuthering Heights) (for live and sampled contrabass)
- 2010 - Blood Wedding (ballet score for symphony orchestra)
- 2012 - Towards Future's Embrace (for solo percussion and chamber orchestra)
- 2013 - Forgotten Lands (for solo trumpet and orchestra)
- 2014 - A Greek Tragedy (for solo snare drums with recorded speech)
- 2014 - Trophic Cascades (for two pianos and two percussion)
- 2016 - Vigil (for solo piano, electronics and chamber ensemble)
- 2017 - Decade Zero (for jazz trio and chamber ensemble)
- 2017 - We Made Us (for solo percussion, piano, electronics and strings)
- 2018 - Spiel (for solo percussion, symphonic wind ensemble and recorded electronics)
- 2019 - Nascent Forms (for percussion quartet))
- 2021 - Forecast (for solo percussion)

== Discography ==
As pianist:

- Steve Martland: Crossing The Border (Factory 1992)
- Steve Martland: Patrol (BMG 1994)
- Bassistry: Bassistry (Okapi 1995)
- Steve Martland: The Factory Masters (BMG 1996)
- Marc Ribot: Shoe String Symphonettes (Tzadik 1997)
- Mike Westbrook: The Orchestra of Smith's Academy (Enja 1998)
- John Adams: Gnarly Buttons/John's Book of Alleged Dances (Nonesuch 1998)

As composer/improviser:

- The Katia Labèque Band: Unspoken (KML 2003)
- Colin Currie: Borrowed Time (Onyx Classics 2007)
- Dave Maric: The Pianos Work (Online Distribution 2014)
- Vicious Circus: Troglodytes Troglodytes (Squib-Box 2014)
- Dave Maric: Musica Antiqua Tronica (Future Daveotron 2018)
- Dave Maric: From Thin Air (Future Daveotron 2018)
