= Hans Vonk (conductor) =

Dutch conductor (1942–2004)

- Born: 18 June 1942; Amsterdam, Netherlands
- Died: 29 August 2004 (aged 62); Amsterdam, Netherlands
- Occupations: Conductor, pedagogue
- Employer(s): Staatskapelle Dresden; St. Louis Symphony; Residentie Orkest; WDR Symphony Orchestra; Netherlands Radio Symphony

Hans Vonk (18 June 1942 – 29 August 2004) was a Dutch conductor.

== Early and middle years ==
Vonk was born in Amsterdam, the son of Franciscus Cornelis and Wilhelmina Vonk. His father was a violinist in the Concertgebouw Orchestra, and died when Vonk was age three. Vonk studied piano with Jaap Spaanderman at the Amsterdam Conservatory and law at Amsterdam University. During this time, he made a living from gigs as a jazz pianist. He later studied conducting with Hermann Scherchen and Franco Ferrara.

Vonk debuted as a conductor with the Netherlands National Ballet. He later married the ballerina, Jessie Folkerts. He also served as assistant conductor with the Concertgebouw Orchestra, and associate conductor with the Royal Philharmonic Orchestra, London.

Vonk held chief conductor positions with De Nederlandse Opera (1976–1985), the Residentie Orkest (1980–1991) and the Netherlands Radio Philharmonic Orchestra. From 1985 to 1990, he was principal conductor of both the Staatskapelle Dresden and the Semper Oper, Dresden. In 1988 he conducted at La Scala in Milan in a revival of Jommelli's Fetonte, but then had to take a year off from conducting after being diagnosed with Guillain–Barré syndrome, a neurological condition. He appeared to recover and resumed conducting. He became chief conductor of the WDR Symphony Orchestra, Cologne in 1991.

== With the SLSO ==
In the US, he made his first guest appearance with the Saint Louis Symphony Orchestra (SLSO) in 1992. In January 1995, he was appointed the SLSO's music director, after Leonard Slatkin, and took up the position in 1996. In 2001, Vonk began to experience muscular weakness, which was not diagnosed to a specific ailment at the time. In 2002, he resigned his position in St. Louis because of these health problems, which were later diagnosed as amyotrophic lateral sclerosis (ALS), also known as Lou Gehrig's Disease.

His last performance with the SLSO was of Mahler's Symphony No. 4, on Saturday, 4 May 2002. The applause lasted four minutes and was followed by a commendation read by the chairman of the board of trustees, Virginia Weldon: "In recognition of his vital leadership and exemplary artistry, as well as his lasting contribution to the rich cultural legacy of both this orchestra and the region of Saint Louis, it is with great pride and affection that the Board of Trustees of the Saint Louis Symphony Orchestra bestows this commendation on Maestro Hans Vonk, on this day, Saturday, 4 May 2002, Saint Louis, Missouri." To which the maestro briefly responded: "Ladies and gentlemen, since I'm a United States conductor I'm supposed to say something to the audience. I would like to thank you for your presence through this six years. Everything I have to say happened tonight on stage."

The SLSO dedicated a program of Hector Berlioz's Requiem to him after his death.

== Final years ==
In March 2002, Vonk was named chief conductor of the Netherlands Radio Symphony (NRSO). He held the post for the 2003–2004 season, and was the orchestra's last chief conductor before its disbandment. His illness had debilitated him to the point that he conducted several NRSO concerts from a wheelchair. On 29 August 2004, Vonk died in his Amsterdam home and is buried in that city under the epitaph (in English):

Music was his life.
Now it brings us
Solace and serenity.

Luuk Reurich wrote a biography of Vonk, Hans Vonk, Een dirigentenleven (Hans Vonk, A Conductor's Life), published in 2006. Vonk's recordings are on the Chandos and Denon labels, among others, and include two CDs of the Dutch composer Alphons Diepenbrock. Vonk was regarded as a specialist in the music of Anton Bruckner as well as an advocate of the music of Peter Schat, including conducting the world premiere of Schat's stage work Houdini.

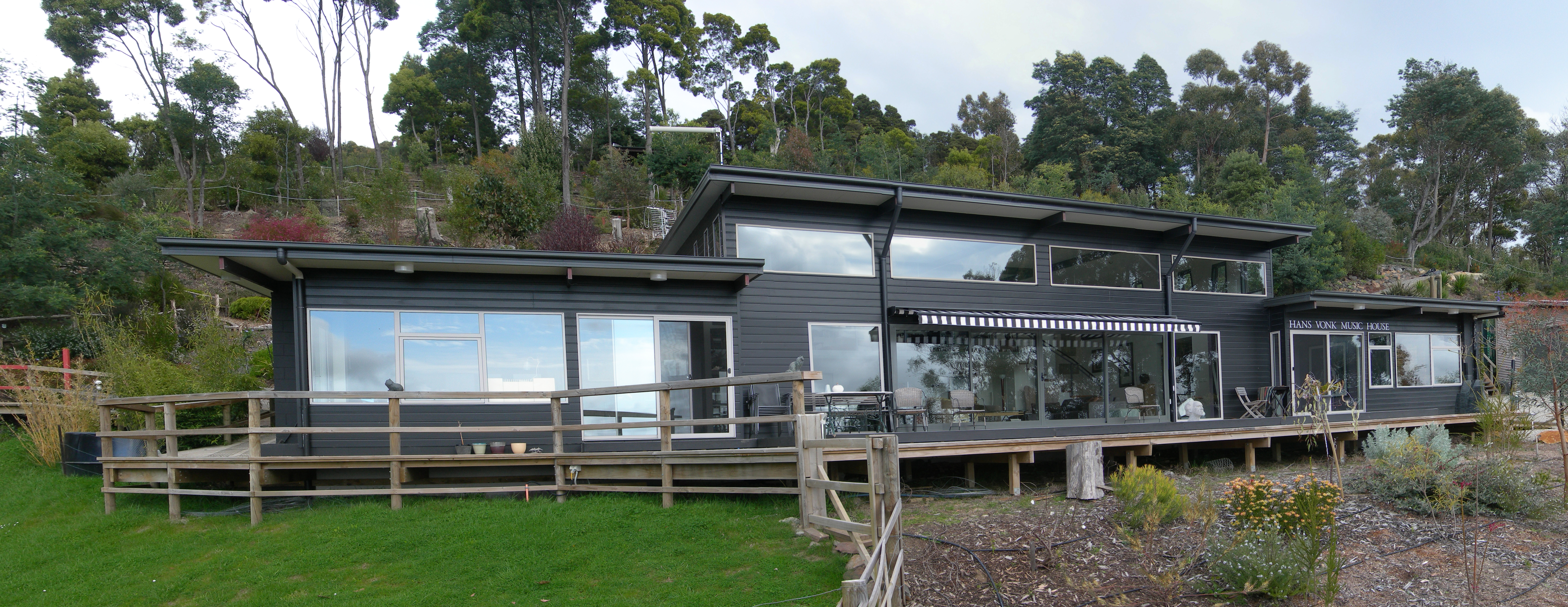
Hans Vonk Music House

Vonk's widow, Jessie, moved to Tasmania where she founded the Hans Vonk Music House, a chamber music venue dedicated to her husband's memory.

== Recordings ==
- Fauré & Schoenberg – Pelléas et Mélisande. Hans Vonk, Saint Louis Symphony Orchestra. PENTATONE PTC 5186324 (2008)
- Gustav Mahler – Symphony No. 4. Hans Vonk, Esther Heideman, Saint Louis Symphony Orchestra. PENTATONE PTC 5186323 (2008)
- Mozart – Symphony No. 40 & Beethoven – Symphony No. 7. Hans Vonk, Saint Louis Symphony Orchestra. PENTATONE PTC 5186322 (2008)
- Beethoven – Symphony No.1 & Brahms – Symphony No. 4. Hans Vonk, Saint Louis Symphony Orchestra. PENTATONE PTC 5186318 (2007)
- Johannes Brahms – The Final Sessions of Hans Vonk. Netherlands Radio Symphony Orchestra. PENTATONE PTC 5186045 (2005)
- Johannes Brahms – Symphony No.2 & Tragic Overture. Hans Vonk, Netherlands Radio Symphony Orchestra. PENTATONE PTC 5186042 (2004)

Cultural offices
| Preceded by Ferdinand Leitner | Chief Conductor, Het Residentie Orkest; 1980–1991 | Succeeded by Yevgeny Svetlanov |
| Preceded by Gary Bertini | Chief Conductor, WDR Symphony Orchestra Cologne; 1990–1997 | Succeeded by Semyon Bychkov |
| Preceded by Leonard Slatkin | Music Director, St. Louis Symphony Orchestra; 1996–2002 | Succeeded by David Robertson |
| Preceded by Eri Klas | Chief Conductor, Netherlands Radio Symphony; 2003–2004 | Succeeded by (no successor) |
