= Vera Mulyani =

Indonesian CEO

- Born: 1985; Jakarta, Indonesia
- Education: Ecole d' Architecture de Nantes, New York Film Academy
- Known for: Architecture, filmmaker, Space Entrepreneur
- Scientific career
- Institutions: Mars City Design Spaceport LA

Vera Mulyani is an Indonesian-born, French-raised architect, filmmaker, children's author, as well as Founder and CEO of Mars City Design, a collaborative platform created to explore the concept of livability and sustainability on Mars as well as Earth. She has been called a Marschitect.

Mulyani was born in Indonesia and earned a master's degree in Architecture, Landscape, and Urban Design from Ecole d'Architecture de Nantes, in France before moving to the United States. She founded Mars City Design in 2015.

== Early life ==
Born in Indonesia, Vera Mulyani grew up in the polluted slums of Jakarta where at the age of 15, she became a translator for a European Magazine, who later inquired about her artwork and encouraged her to exhibit her creations. French collectors who viewed Mulyani's art further encouraged her creative abilities mentioning that she should consider training to be an artist in Paris. This recommendation in addition to the rising violence near Mulyani's home during the 1998 terrorist attacks in Jakarta convinced her to move to France to pursue her artistic education.

== Early career ==
In 2001 Mulyani entered Ecole d'Architecture de Nantes, in France where she earned a master's degree in Architecture, Landscape, and Urban Design and took a job working with one of the most prestigious architects in Southern France, Rudy Ricciotti. This brought her the chance to design a famous Villa in the South of France and be part of the design team for The Louvre Museum project, in Lens. Following her degree in architecture, Vera Mulyani displayed her thesis book "F*** da Rules", questioning Manhattan's urban design, forecasting the economy collapsing through the 2005–2007 construction boom. She formulated the concept of "Recycling Cities", which consisted of transforming damaged areas caused by industrialism into sustainable Green Zones, to better integrate the natural environment into human living spaces.

== Filmmaker ==
Moving to New York City Vera Mulyani gained an interest in the art of film after her work on the documentary based on her thesis "F*** da Rules", she obtained a master's degree in Filmmaking from the New York Film Academy in 2010. Her two short films "Elah and the Moon" and "The Melody of Choice" were successfully crowdfunded and were hosted at the Cannes Film Festival as well as other prominent venues. Prior to these efforts Mulyani had completed her first short film, The Forgotten Land which was also featured at Cannes

=== Short films ===
The Forgotten Land which was inspired by the famous filmmaker David Lynch, is a fictitious story concerning two women from different time periods (one from the 19th century, the other from the 1960s) meeting on New York's Roosevelt Island and together discovering its history. The film was selected as part of the Cannes Film Festival's Short Film Corner in 2008

Elah and The Moon is a period-style fantasy film about a boy seeking love and approval from his father. Mulyani refers to it as "a visual poem." The film was selected for the Cannes Film Festival's Short Film Corner in both 2009 and 2010.

The Melody of Choice which was selected for the first annual Louisiana Film Prize in 2012, is the story of a gifted boy who hears music in nature despite a challenging upbringing. He collects used cans as well as other trash and must "ultimately choose between forgoing his dreams to become a musician or moving ahead as his father's life hangs in the balance."

== Mars City Design ==
Moving to the Los Angeles area and finding inspiration in the vision of SpaceX, CEO Elon Musk, to begin colonizing Mars within the next decade, Vera Mulyani founded Mars City Design in 2015.

Mars City Design is a collaborative platform created to explore the concept of livability and sustainability on Mars, as well as to contribute some solutions to the climate change on Earth. The company calls for an annual competition to field project based architectural designs that explore the feasibility of future Martian cities, as well as various forms of technological innovation that engineers key functions of livability and sustainability on Mars. Mars City Design calls not only on scientists and engineers, but also artists who wish to share their vision of a multi planetary society through their creative talents in visual, aural, and written mediums.

Vera Mulyani, who has always dreamed of being an architect on Mars has articulated that the mission of the platform will be realized by creating structures and supporting technologies that will result in a viable city in the extreme environments of the red planet. In her own words Ms. Mulyani states:

”It is not enough to just travel to Mars and survive, now we must develop a way in which we can sustainably thrive on Mars. It is essential that we call on a new generation of thinkers and innovators to make this a reality.”

In addition, Mars City Design recently completed a successful Kickstarter campaign to raise funds to support a workshop named Mars City Power Lab, which will host design winning teams as well as contestants at the University of Southern California in September 2016.

Vera Mulyani and her Mars City Design vision were featured in a 2018–2019 documentary show, made for the Discovery Channel, with a total reach of 90 Million audiences from around the world, on multiple platforms;

== Other activities ==
In addition to her activities as CEO of Mars City Design, Vera Mulyani is the Co Founder and Organizer of Spaceport LA. which is the "home base for space enthusiasts, learners and professionals living in Los Angeles, California. Our goal is to advance space exploration by increasing public awareness and stimulating innovators to create new space startups in the Los Angeles area."

Vera Mulyani is also an author of a series of children's books titled "The Parable of Many Colors", this eight volume series follows 8 colorfully names characters who are brilliant artists; through their creative ingenuity they inspire others to follow dreams and realize their passions. Two volumes have currently been published: "Mr Blue" and "Madame Red"

== See also ==
- Architecture
- Filmmaking
- Life on Mars
- Colonization of Mars
