= List of youth orchestras =

This is a list of active youth orchestras. National youth orchestras are highlighted in bold.

== Asia ==
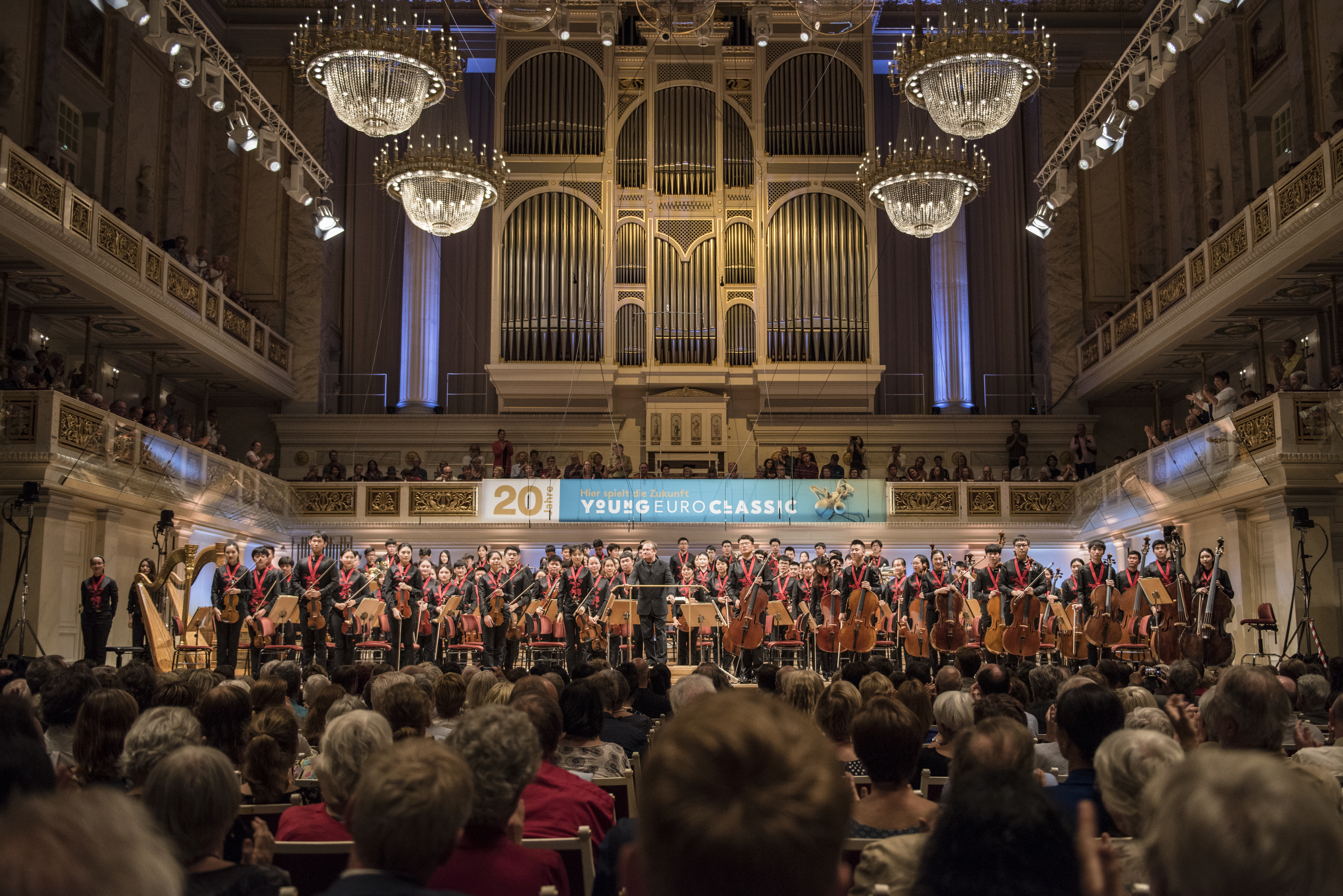
The National Youth Orchestra of China performing at Young Euro Classic (2019)

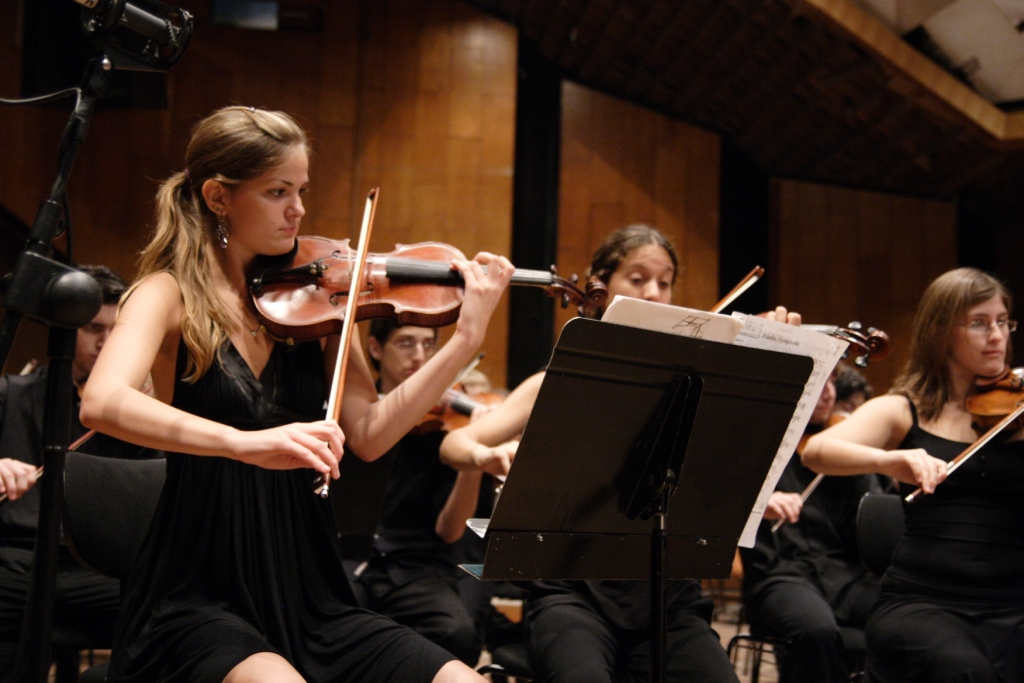
The Young Israel Philharmonic Orchestra performing at the Jerusalem Music Centre (2005)

- Arab Youth Philharmonic Orchestra
- Asian Youth Orchestra

=== Afghanistan ===
- **Afghan Youth Orchestra**

=== Cambodia ===
- **Angkor National Youth Orchestra**

=== China ===
- **National Youth Orchestra of China**
- Guangzhou Symphony Youth Orchestra

=== Hong Kong ===
- Metropolitan Youth Orchestra of Hong Kong
- Hong Kong Festival Orchestra

=== India ===
- **India National Youth Orchestra**

=== Iraq ===
- **National Youth Orchestra of Iraq**

=== Israel ===
- **Young Israel Philharmonic Orchestra**

=== Japan ===
- Fukushima Youth Sinfonietta

=== Malaysia ===
- **Malaysian Philharmonic Youth Orchestra**

=== Singapore ===
- **Singapore National Youth Orchestra**

=== Thailand ===
- Siam Sinfonietta

=== Turkey ===
- **Turkish National Youth Philharmonic Orchestra**

== Africa ==
=== South Africa ===
- **South African National Youth Orchestra Foundation**
- Johannesburg Youth Orchestra

== Europe ==
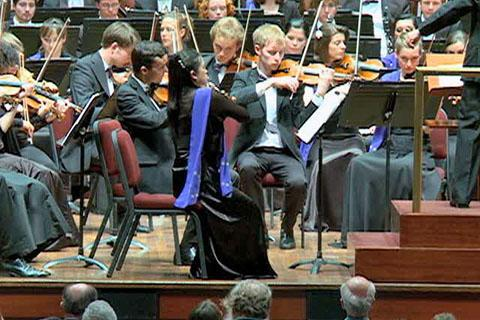
The European Union Youth Orchestra performing in Washington, D.C., United States, in 2012

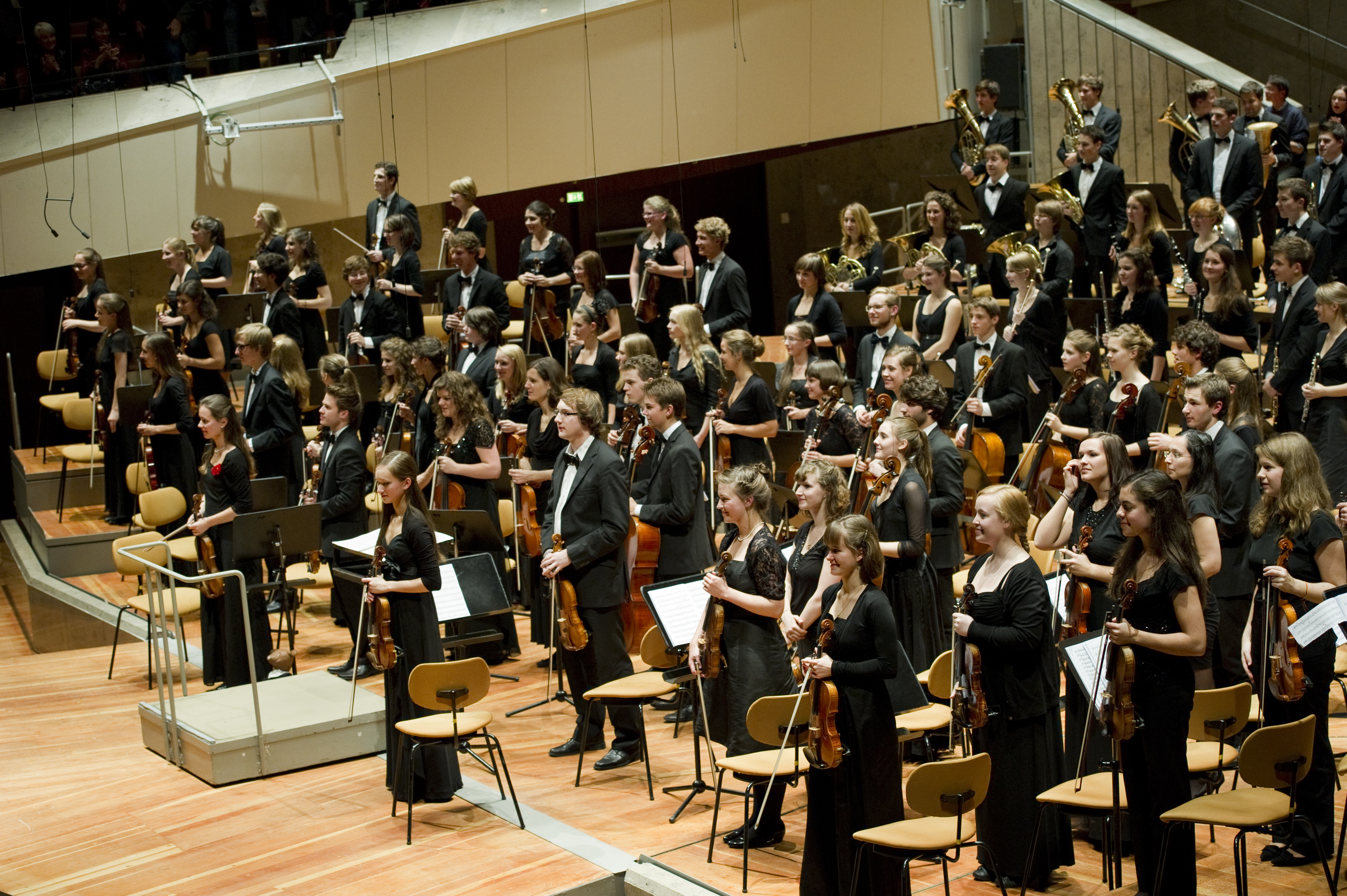
The Bundesjugendorchester at a concert in the Berliner Philharmonie in 2011

- **European Union Youth Orchestra**
- European Union Baroque Orchestra
- Gustav Mahler Youth Orchestra
- Internationale Junge Orchesterakademie
- Theresia Orchestra
- Junges Klangforum Mitte Europa
- Kremerata Baltica
- Baltic Sea Philharmonic

=== Austria ===
- **Wiener Jeunesse Orchester**

=== Denmark ===
- **Danish Youth Ensemble**

=== Finland ===
- Helsinki Strings

=== France ===
- **Orchestre Français des Jeunes**

=== Germany ===
- **Bundesjugendorchester**
- **Junge Deutsche Philharmonie**
- Deutsche Streicherphilharmonie
- Landesjugendorchester Baden-Württemberg

=== Greece ===
- **Greek Youth Symphony Orchestra**

=== Ireland ===
- **National Youth Orchestra of Ireland**
- Cross Border Orchestra of Ireland
- Galway Youth Orchestra

=== Italy ===
- **Orchestra Giovanile Italiana**
- Stresa Festival Orchestra

=== Moldova ===
- **Moldovan National Youth Orchestra**

=== Netherlands ===
- **National Youth Orchestra of the Netherlands**

=== Norway ===
- **Norwegian National Youth Orchestra**

=== Poland ===
- **Polish Sinfonia Iuventus Orchestra**

=== Portugal ===
- **Portuguese Youth Orchestra**
- Portuguese Chamber Orchestra

=== Romania ===
- **Romanian Youth Orchestra**

=== Slovakia ===
- **Slovak Youth Orchestra**

=== Spain ===
- **Spanish National Youth Orchestra**

=== Switzerland ===
- **Swiss Youth Symphony Orchestra**

=== Russia ===
- **Russian National Youth Symphony Orchestra**

=== Sweden ===
- **El Sistema Sweden National Orchestra**
- Stockholm Youth Symphony Orchestra

=== United Kingdom ===
- **National Youth Orchestra of Great Britain**
- National Children's Orchestra of Great Britain
- National Schools Symphony Orchestra
- National Scout and Guide Symphony Orchestra
- National Youth String Orchestra
- National Youth Wind Orchestra of Great Britain

==== England ====
- CBSO Youth Orchestra
- City of Sheffield Youth Orchestra
- Colne Valley Training Orchestra
- Colne Valley Youth Orchestra
- Leicestershire Schools Symphony Orchestra
- London Schools Symphony Orchestra
- Nottingham Youth Orchestra
- Reading Youth Orchestra
- Somerset County Youth Orchestra
- South Tyneside Youth Orchestra
- Stockport Youth Orchestra
- Suffolk Youth Orchestra
- Tees Valley Youth Orchestra
- Wessex Youth Orchestra

==== Scotland ====
- **National Youth Orchestras of Scotland**

==== Wales ====
- **National Youth Orchestra of Wales**

== Oceania ==
=== Australia ===
- **Australian Youth Orchestra**
- ABC Sinfonia
- Adelaide Youth Orchestra
- Australian Youth Orchestra
- Canberra Youth Orchestra
- Melbourne String Ensemble
- Queensland Youth Orchestras
- SBS Radio and Television Youth Orchestra
- Sydney Youth Orchestra
- Victorian Youth Symphony Orchestra
- West Australian Youth Jazz Orchestra

=== New Zealand ===
- **National Youth Orchestra of New Zealand**

== Americas ==
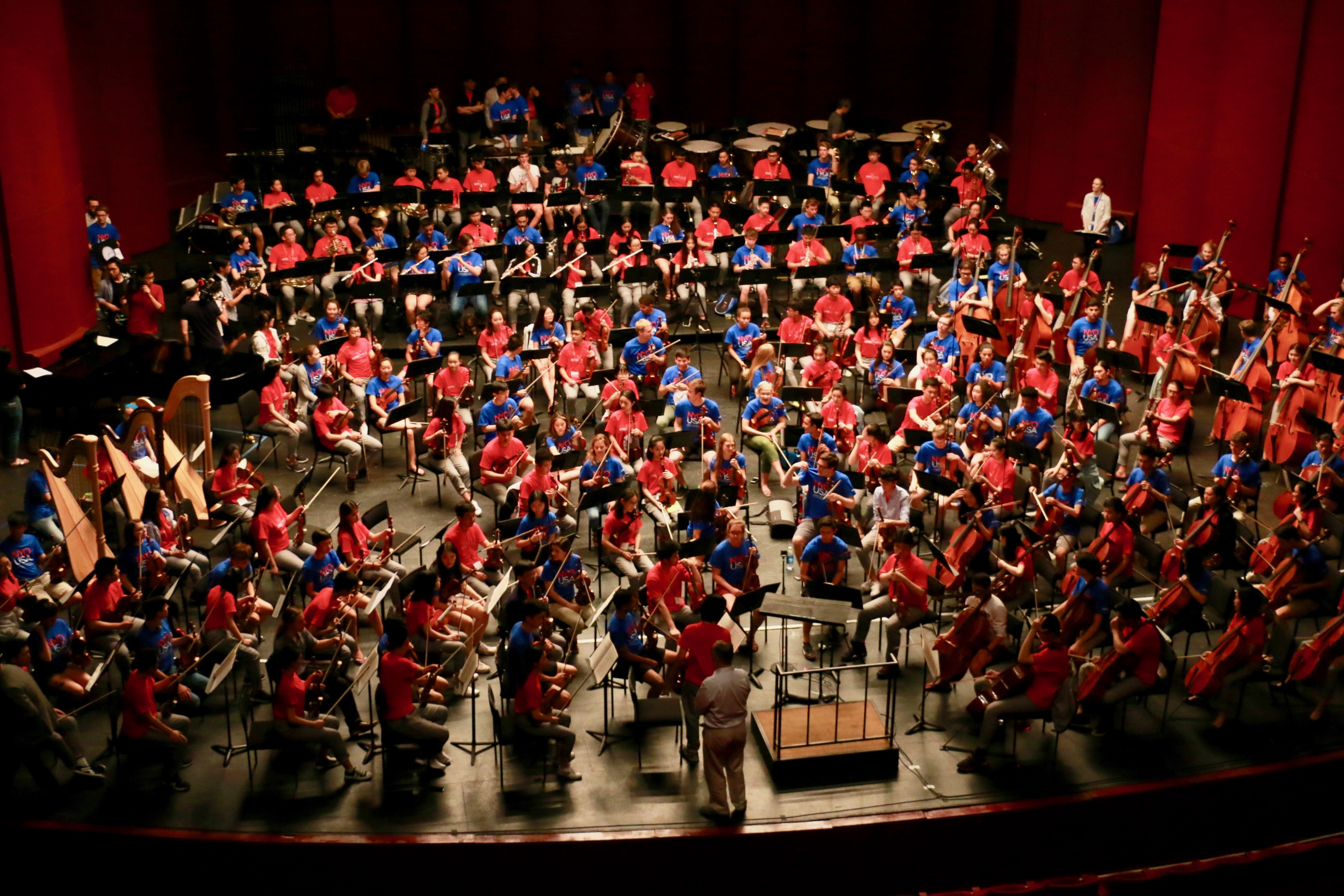
The National Youth Orchestra of China (in red) rehearsing alongside the National Youth Orchestra of the United States of America (in blue)

- American Heritage Lyceum Philharmonic

=== Canada ===
- **National Youth Orchestra of Canada**
- Montreal Youth Symphony Orchestra
- New Brunswick Youth Orchestra
- Nova Scotia Youth Orchestra
- Richmond Delta Youth Orchestra
- Saskatoon Youth Orchestra
- Toronto Symphony Youth Orchestra
- Vancouver Youth Symphony Orchestra

=== Chile ===
- **National Youth Symphony Orchestra of Chile**

=== Colombia ===
- **Colombian Youth Philharmonic**

=== Dominican Republic ===
- **National Youth Symphony Orchestra of the Dominican Republic**

=== United States ===
- **National Youth Orchestra of the United States of America**

=== Venezuela ===
- **Simón Bolívar Symphony Orchestra**
- Simón Bolívar Youth Symphonic Band

== See also ==
- List of symphony orchestras
