= Junges Klangforum Mitte Europa =

The Young Sound Forum of Central Europe (Junges Klangforum Mitte Europa) is a European youth orchestra consisting of young German, Polish and Czech musicians.

== Goals ==
The aim of the Young Sound Forum of Central Europe is the rejuvenation of the cultural landscape of Central Europe by promoting and reclaiming its lost musical works. In addition to the classic concert repertoire, the Young Sound Forum of Central Europe has equally dedicated itself to fostering contemporary music through commissioned compositions as well as performing rarely played pieces by composers ostracized and persecuted by the National Socialist regime from 1933 to 1945.

== History ==
The Young Sound Forum of Central Europe was founded in 2002 by the German conductor Christoph Altstaedt. The orchestra initially consisted of former members of the Bundesjugendorchester (the German National Youth Orchestra). Following a co-operative project with Czech musicians in the former concentration camp of Terezin (Theresienstadt) in 2003, the idea of a tri-national orchestra including Polish musicians was born in 2004. The patrons of the orchestra are Richard von Weizsäcker, Václav Havel and Lech Wałęsa.

In its first five years of existence the Young Sound Forum of Central Europe has been equally recognised for its musical excellence and unique repertoire as well as for its contributions to understanding and reconciliation in Europe between Poland, the Czech Republic and Germany. The Young Sound Forum of Central Europe received the Praemium Imperiale "Grant For Young Artists" 2004, the Marion Doenhoff Award 2005 and the European Youth Orchestra Prize 2006.

The musical director of the Young Sound Forum of Central Europe is its founding conductor Christoph Altstaedt, a Tanglewood Music Festival conducting fellow in 2008. Guest conductors of the orchestra have included Sebastian Weigle, Muhai Tang and Krzysztof Penderecki. The Young Sound Forum of Central Europe has 2-3 European concert tours annually and toured Japan in 2005.

== See also ==
- List of youth orchestras
