= European Federation of National Youth Orchestras =

- Abbreviation: EFNYO
- Formation: 1994
- Headquarters: Vienna, Austria
- Website: www.efnyo.org

Countries with a member orchestra in EFNYO (associated members in light blue; overseas members not shown)

The European Federation of National Youth Orchestras (EFNYO) is the association of the national youth orchestras of Europe. Its mission statement is to "provide a unique platform for the exchange of experience in orchestra training". It is co-funded by the Creative Europe Programme of the European Union.

EFNYO is a member of the European Music Council, International Music Council, Jeunesses Musicales International and Culture Action Europe.

== Members ==
Members as of December 2025.

=== National youth orchestras ===
| Country | Orchestra | Status |
|---|---|---|
| Austria | Wiener Jeunesse Orchester | Full member |
| Canada | National Youth Orchestra of Canada | Associated member |
| Colombia | Colombian Youth Philharmonic | Associated member |
| Cyprus | Cyprus Youth Symphony Orchestra | Full member |
| Denmark | Danish Youth Ensemble | Full member |
| Finland | Sibelius Academy Symphony Orchestra | Full member |
| France | Orchestre Français des Jeunes | Full member |
| Germany | Bundesjugendorchester | Full member |
| Germany | Junge Deutsche Philharmonie | Full member |
| Greece | Greek Youth Symphony Orchestra | Associated member |
| Ireland | National Youth Orchestra of Ireland | Full member |
| Israel | Young Israel Philharmonic Orchestra | Associated member |
| Italy | Orchestra Giovanile Italiana | Full member |
| Moldova | Moldovan National Youth Orchestra | Associated member |
| Netherlands | National Youth Orchestra of the Netherlands | Full member |
| Norway | Ungdomssymfonikerne | Full member |
| Poland | Polish Sinfonia Iuventus Orchestra | Full member |
| Portugal | Jovem Orquestra Portuguesa | Full member |
| Romania | Romanian Youth Orchestra | Full member |
| Scotland/United Kingdom | National Youth Orchestras of Scotland | Full member |
| Slovakia | Slovak Youth Orchestra | Full member |
| Slovenia | Slovenian Youth Orchestra | Full Member |
| Spain | Spanish National Youth Orchestra | Full member |
| Switzerland | Swiss Youth Symphony Orchestra | Associated member |
| Turkey | Turkish National Youth Philharmonic Orchestra | Full member |
| Ukraine | Youth Symphony Orchestra of Ukraine | Full Member |

=== International orchestras ===
| Host country | Orchestra | Members from | Status |
|---|---|---|---|
| Italy | European Union Youth Orchestra | European Union | Associated member |
| Austria | Gustav Mahler Jugendorchester | Europe | Associated member |
| Finland | Orkester Norden | Denmark, Norway, Sweden, Estonia, Latvia, Lithuania | Associated member |
| France | Jeune Orchestre de l'Abbaye | International | Associated member |
| France | Orchestre des Jeunes de la Méditerranée | Albania, Algeria, Bosnia, Cyprus, Croatia, Egypt, Spain, France, Greece, Israel, Italy, Lebanon, Libya, Macedonia, Malta, Morocco, Monaco, Montenegro, Palestine, Portugal, Slovenia, Syria, Tunisia, Turkey | Associated member |
| Germany | Baltic Sea Philharmonic | Denmark, Estonia, Finland, Germany, Latvia, Lithuania, Norway, Poland, Russia, Sweden | Associated member |
| Germany | Schleswig-Holstein Festival Orchester | International | Associated member |
| Switzerland | Philharmonie der Animato Stiftung | International | Associated member |
| Switzerland | Verbier Festival Orchestra | International | Associated member |

=== Organisations ===
- Britten-Pears Orchestra
- Live Music Now Scotland
- Young Euro Classic

== See also ==
- List of youth orchestras
