= Christoph Altstaedt =

German conductor

- Born: January 19, 1980 (age 46); Heidelberg, Germany
- Education: Detmold Music Academy, Hanns Eisler School of Music Berlin
- Occupation: Conductor
- Organizations: Deutsche Oper am Rhein, Tyrolean Symphony Orchestra Innsbruck
- Known for: Opera and symphonic conducting
- Notable work: Conducting performances in opera houses across Europe
- Relatives: Nicolas Altstaedt (brother)
- Awards: Praemium Imperiale, Marion Dönhoff Prize (with Junges Klangforum Mitte Europa)

Christoph Altstaedt (born January 19, 1980, in Heidelberg) is a German conductor.

== Life ==
As a junior student at the Detmold Music Academy, he studied piano with Edmundo Lasheras and conducting with Joachim Harder. He also took piano lessons with Karl-Heinz Kämmerling in Hanover. He subsequently enrolled as a regular student in the piano class of Jean-Efflam Bavouzet, then continuing his studies at the Music Academy “Hanns Eisler” in Berlin from 2002 onwards, where his teachers included Hans-Dieter Baum and Alexander Vitlin. Starting in 2003, he became a fellow of the Deutscher Musikrat’s Conductors’ Forum, attending courses with Kurt Masur, Pierre Boulez (as part of the Lucerne Festival Academy), Sebastian Weigle, Johannes Kalitzke and Jorma Panula. In 2008 and 2009 he was one of three conductors to be invited as conducting fellows to Tanglewood. There, he assisted James Levine in a production of Don Giovanni.

He made his debut as an opera conductor in 2006 at the Staatstheater am Gärtnerplatz in Munich, where he had been engaged as a répétiteur during the last season under Klaus Schultz. There, he conducted Gianni Schicchi, The Magic Flute, Die Entführung aus dem Serail, Werther, Hänsel und Gretel, La traviata and Cinderella by Peter Maxwell Davies.

In 2010 he took a conducting position at the Deutsche Oper am Rhein, where he expanded his repertoire to include The Marriage of Figaro, Così fan tutte, La bohème, Luisa Miller, Carmen, The Barber of Seville and Die Prinzessin auf der Erbse by Ernst Toch. He also began to collaborate intensively with the Ballet am Rhein under Martin Schläpfer and with choreographers Mats Ek, Hans van Manen and Nils Christie. He made guest appearances in Luxembourg with Massenet's Manon, at Opera North with Hänsel und Gretel and Don Giovanni, at Finland's National Opera Helsinki with Così fan tutte, in Glyndebourne, Savonlinna and Zurich with Die Entführung aus dem Serail and in Basel, where he conducted The Magic Flute.

Christoph Altstaedt was appointed interim chief conductor of the Tyrolean Symphony Orchestra Innsbruck from 2011 to 2013, where he conducted Cherubini's Médée and Mozart's Idomeneo. On the concert stage, he has worked with soloists such as Gidon Kremer, Steven Isserlis, Mark Padmore and Radek Baborák, among others.

From 2004 to 2011 he founded and directed the "Junges Klangforum Mitte Europa", a youth orchestra uniting music students from Poland, the Czech Republic and Germany, which won such awards as the "Praemium Imperiale" and the "Marion Dönhoff Prize", among others. Christoph Altstaedt has a keen interest in education work and has conducted the orchestra of the Julius-Stern-Institute at the Berlin University of the Arts (UdK)], the State Youth Orchestras of the Saarland, Baden-Württemberg and Berlin as well as the Junge Deutsche Philharmonie, the Bundesjugendorchester and the Junge Norddeutsche Philharmonie.

He is the older brother of cellist Nicolas Altstaedt.

== Discography ==
- Günter Raphael: Symphony No. 2, Op. 34; CPO
- Rolf Martinsson: Golden Harmony, Concerto for Saxophone; Phono Suecia
