= Young Israel Philharmonic Orchestra =

National youth orchestra of Israel

- Youth orchestra
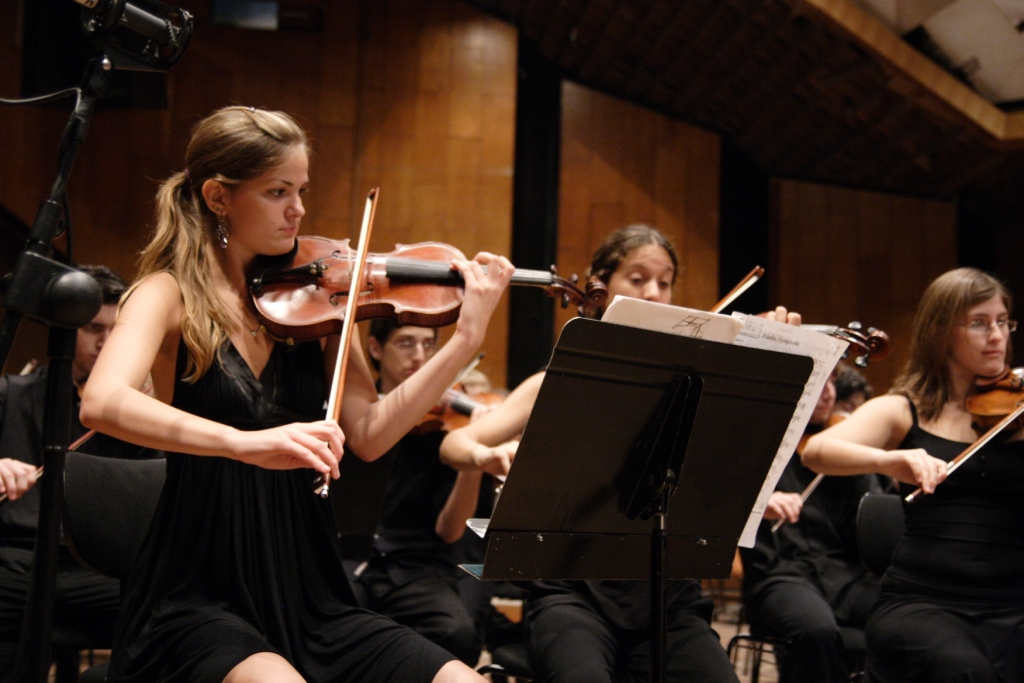
- The Young Israel Philharmonic Orchestra performing at the Jerusalem Music Centre (2005)
- Native name: התזמורת הפילהרמונית הישראלית הצעירה
- Short name: YIPO
- Founded: 1984
- Location: Jerusalem Music Centre, Jerusalem
- Website: www.jmc.org.il/E/index.php?p=fltz

The Young Israel Philharmonic Orchestra (Hebrew: התזמורת הפילהרמונית הישראלית הצעירה, YIPO) is the national youth orchestra of Israel, based in the Jerusalem Music Centre, Jerusalem. It consists of 140 members divided into two ensembles, a 40-member string ensemble for ages 11–14, and the larger 100-member symphony orchestra for ages 14–18.

Over 90% of the Young Israel Philharmonic Orchestra's graduates go on to higher education in music, with many taking up prominent positions in the Israel Philharmonic Orchestra.

It is an associated member of the European Federation of National Youth Orchestras.

== See also ==
- List of youth orchestras
