= Praemium Imperiale =

Japanese arts prize

The Praemium Imperiale
- Awarded for: "Outstanding contributions to the development, promotion and progress of the arts"
- Country: Japan
- Presented by: The Imperial Family of Japan; The Japan Art Association
- First award: 1989
- Website: www.praemiumimperiale.org

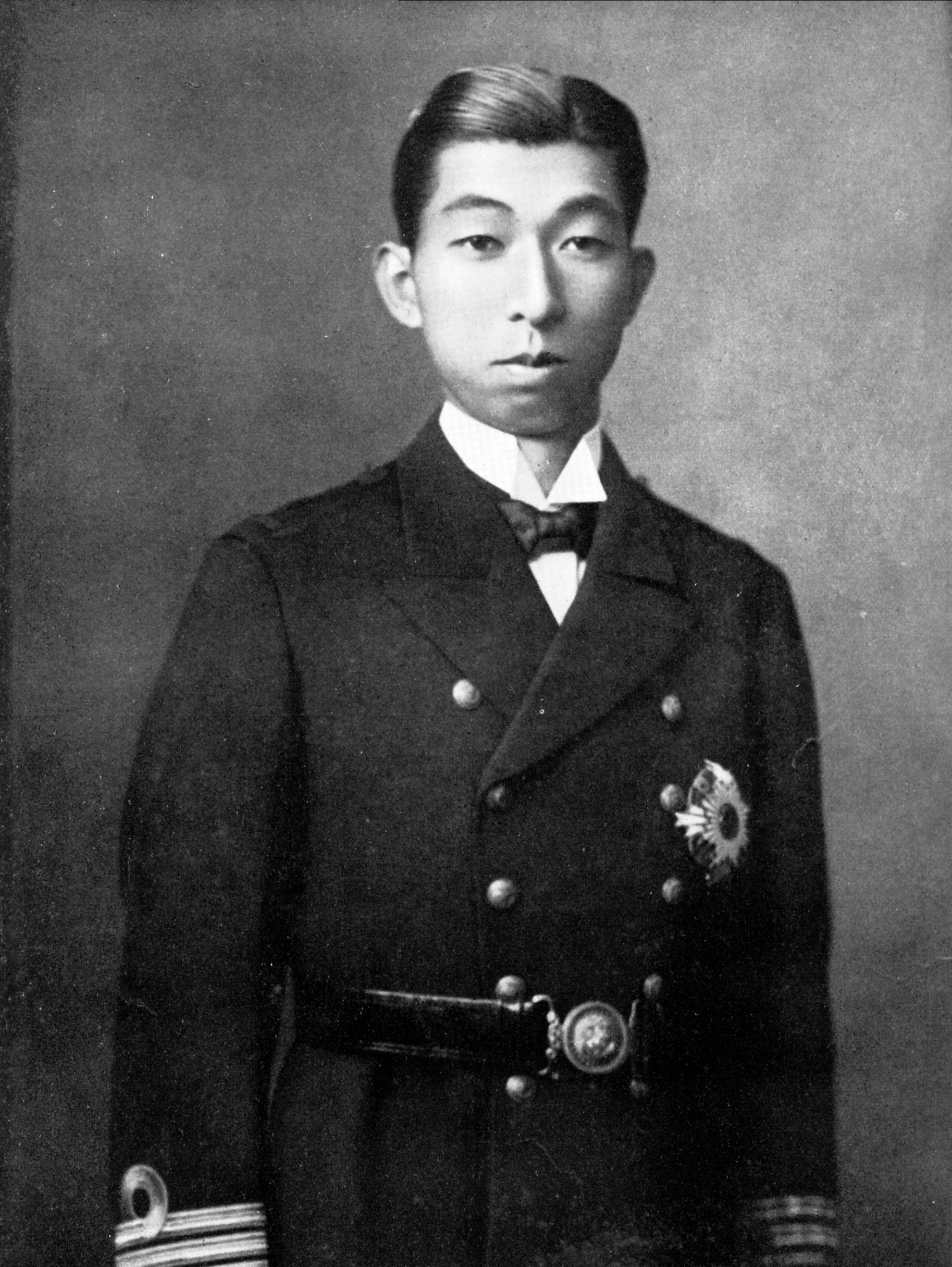
Prince Takamatsu

The Praemium Imperiale (Japanese: 高松宮殿下記念世界文化賞, romanized: Takamatsu-no-miya Denka Kinen Sekai Bunka-shō, lit. 'World Culture Prize in Memory of His Imperial Highness Prince Takamatsu') is an international art prize inaugurated in 1988 and awarded since 1989 by the Imperial family of Japan on behalf of the Japan Art Association in the fields of painting, sculpture, architecture, music, theatre and film.

The prize consists of a gold medal and 15 million Japanese yen, and was created by the Fujisankei Communications Group, which pays the expenses of around $3 million per year. The prizes are awarded for outstanding contributions to the development, promotion and progress of the arts.

== Information ==
The Praemium Imperiale is awarded in the memory of Prince Takamatsu (1905–1987), younger brother of Emperor Shōwa who reigned from 1926 through 1989. Prince Takamatsu was famous for his longtime support of the development, promotion and progress of arts in the world.

The laureates are announced each September; the prize presentation ceremony and related events are held in Tokyo, Japan, each November. The prize presentation ceremony is held in the presence of His Imperial Highness Prince Hitachi, President of the Japan Art Association, at the Meiji Kinenkan in Tokyo. Prince Hitachi presents the prizes to the selected laureates. The prize consists of a gold medal and 15 million Japanese yen, and was created by the Fujisankei Communications Group, which pays the expenses of around $3 million per year.

The laureates are annually recommended by international advisers, and decided by an anonymous committee of the Japan Art Association. The advisers include Yasuhiro Nakasone, William H. Luers, Lamberto Dini, François Pinault, Chris Patten, and Klaus-Dieter Lehmann. Honorary advisers included Jacques Chirac, David Rockefeller, David Rockefeller Jr., Helmut Schmidt and Richard von Weizsäcker.

== Table of laureates ==
Year	Painting	Sculpture	Architecture	Music	Film/Theater
1989	Willem de Kooning and David Hockney	Umberto Mastroianni	I. M. Pei	Pierre Boulez	Marcel Carné
1990	Antoni Tàpies	Arnaldo Pomodoro	James Stirling	Leonard Bernstein	Federico Fellini
1991	Balthus	Eduardo Chillida	Gae Aulenti	György Ligeti	Ingmar Bergman
1992	Pierre Soulages	Anthony Caro	Frank Gehry	Alfred Schnittke	Akira Kurosawa
1993	Jasper Johns	Max Bill	Kenzo Tange	Mstislav Rostropovich	Maurice Béjart
1994	Zao Wou-ki	Richard Serra	Charles Correa	Henri Dutilleux	John Gielgud
1995	Roberto Matta	Christo	Renzo Piano	Andrew Lloyd Webber	Nakamura Utaemon VI
1996	Cy Twombly	César	Tadao Ando	Luciano Berio	Andrzej Wajda
1997	Gerhard Richter	George Segal	Richard Meier	Ravi Shankar	Peter Brook
1998	Robert Rauschenberg	Dani Karavan	Álvaro Siza	Sofia Gubaidulina	Richard Attenborough
1999	Anselm Kiefer	Louise Bourgeois	Fumihiko Maki	Oscar Peterson	Pina Bausch
2000	Ellsworth Kelly	Niki de Saint Phalle	Richard Rogers	Hans Werner Henze	Stephen Sondheim
2001	Lee Ufan	Marta Pan	Jean Nouvel	Ornette Coleman	Arthur Miller
2002	Sigmar Polke	Giuliano Vangi	Norman Foster	Dietrich Fischer-Dieskau	Jean-Luc Godard
2003	Bridget Riley	Mario Merz	Rem Koolhaas	Claudio Abbado	Ken Loach
2004	Georg Baselitz	Bruce Nauman	Oscar Niemeyer	Krzysztof Penderecki	Abbas Kiarostami
2005	Robert Ryman	Issey Miyake	Yoshio Taniguchi	Martha Argerich	Merce Cunningham
2006	Yayoi Kusama	Christian Boltanski	Frei Otto	Steve Reich	Maya Plisetskaya
2007	Daniel Buren	Tony Cragg	Herzog & de Meuron	Daniel Barenboim	Ellen Stewart
2008	Richard Hamilton	Ilya and Emilia Kabakov	Peter Zumthor	Zubin Mehta	Sakata Tōjūrō
2009	Hiroshi Sugimoto	Richard Long	Zaha Hadid	Alfred Brendel	Tom Stoppard
2010	Enrico Castellani	Rebecca Horn	Toyo Ito	Maurizio Pollini	Sophia Loren
2011	Bill Viola	Anish Kapoor	Ricardo Legorreta	Seiji Ozawa	Judi Dench
2012	Cai Guo-Qiang	Cecco Bonanotte	Henning Larsen	Philip Glass	Yoko Morishita
2013	Michelangelo Pistoletto	Antony Gormley	David Chipperfield	Plácido Domingo	Francis Ford Coppola
2014	Martial Raysse	Giuseppe Penone	Steven Holl	Arvo Pärt	Athol Fugard
2015	Tadanori Yokoo	Wolfgang Laib	Dominique Perrault	Mitsuko Uchida	Sylvie Guillem
2016	Cindy Sherman	Annette Messager	Paulo Mendes da Rocha	Gidon Kremer	Martin Scorsese
2017	Shirin Neshat	El Anatsui	Rafael Moneo	Youssou N'Dour	Mikhail Baryshnikov
2018	Pierre Alechinsky	Fujiko Nakaya	Christian de Portzamparc	Riccardo Muti	Catherine Deneuve
2019	William Kentridge	Mona Hatoum	Tod Williams and Billie Tsien	Anne-Sophie Mutter	Bando Tamasaburo
2020	No award	No award	No award	No award	No award
2021	Sebastião Salgado	James Turrell	Glenn Murcutt	Yo-Yo Ma	No recipient
2022	Giulio Paolini	Ai Weiwei	Kazuyo Sejima and Ryue Nishizawa	Krystian Zimerman	Wim Wenders
2023	Vija Celmins	Olafur Eliasson	Diébédo Francis Kéré	Wynton Marsalis	Robert Wilson
2024	Sophie Calle	Doris Salcedo	Shigeru Ban	Maria João Pires	Ang Lee
2025	Peter Doig	Marina Abramović	Eduardo Souto de Moura	András Schiff	Anne Teresa De Keersmaeker
2026	Jenny Holzer	Andy Goldsworthy	Daniel Libeskind	Herbert Blomstedt	Cate Blanchett

== Grants for Young Artists ==
Since 1997, a series of grants have been made to organizations which nourish young artists.

- 1997 Hanoi Conservatory of Music, Vietnam
- 1998 Polish National Film, Television and Theater School, Poland
- 1999 Instituto Superior de Arte, Cuba
- 2000 Ulster Youth Orchestra, Northern Ireland
- 2001 Résidence du Festival, France
- 2002 European Union Youth Orchestra
- 2003 De Sono Associazione per la Musica, Italy
- 2004 Young Sound Forum of Central Europe
- 2005 Kusatsu International Summer Music Academy, Japan
- 2006 State Foundation of the National Network of Youth and Children Orchestras of Venezuela (El Sistema)
- 2007 West-Eastern Divan Orchestra
- 2008 Italian Youth Orchestra, Italy
- 2009 Kremerata Baltica, Latvia/Lithuania/Estonia
- 2010 Asian Youth Orchestra
- 2011 Southbank Sinfonia and The Royal Court Young Writers Programme
- 2012 The Sphinx Organization, US
- 2013 The JuniOrchestra of Accademia Nazionale di Santa Cecilia in Rome
- 2014 The Zinsou Foundation, Benin
- 2015 Yangon Film School, Myanmar/Germany
- 2016 Five Arts Centre, Malaysia
- 2017 Zoukak Theatre Company and Cultural Association, Lebanon
- 2018 Shakespeare Schools Foundation
- 2019 Démos (Philharmonie de Paris)
- 2021 The Advanced Training School of the Central Institute for Restoration, Italy
- 2022 Kronberg Academy Foundation (Germany)
- 2023 Rural Studio, US and Harlem School of the Arts, US
- 2024 Komunitas Salihara Arts Center (Indonesia）
- 2025 National Youth Theatre (U.K.)
- 2026 La Source Garouste (France)

== See also ==
- Fuji Television
- Sankei Shimbun
