= National Scout and Guide Symphony Orchestra =

The National Scout and Guide Symphony Orchestra (NSGSO) was formed in 1976 by George Odam and Sue Stevens as a joint youth orchestra of The Scout Association and Girlguiding in the United Kingdom.

Since it was formed, the orchestra has met yearly, undertaking a week-long course, finishing normally with 2 concerts. The orchestra has also undertaken several tours abroad taking participants to United States, Greece, Germany, The Czech Republic and, in 2004, Estonia. The orchestra has also been found performing in such prestigious venues as Westminster Abbey, St. George's Chapel, Windsor Castle and The Royal Albert Hall as well as performances for Royalty.

The orchestra has tackled pieces such as Night on Bald Mountain by Modest Mussorgsky, Academic Festival Overture by Johannes Brahms and Borodin's second symphony in B-minor.

The course is led by an experienced orchestral conductor and supported by a team of professional musicians as section tutors. Rehearsals are interspersed with an active programme of varied sports, crafts, Scouting and Guiding activities.

Past conductors include Robert Cracknell, Martin Crozier, Alan Bell, Lee Marchant and the present conductor is Leon Gee. The inspirational first conductor of the orchestra was George Odam.

The orchestra performed at the Scout festival Live07 at The O2 Arena in Greenwich towards the end of 2007. In 2008, it performed at the Edinburgh Festival playing 'The Great Adventure', a symphony commissioned for the Scouting 2007 Centenary.

Rodney Newton was commissioned by The Scout Association to write a symphony to celebrate their centenary. The result was "The Great Adventure", which outlines Baden-Powell's life. This was written, and played, by the NSGSO and the 2nd Rossendale Scout Brass Band. Mr.Newton was then commissioned by Girlguiding UK to write a piece for their centenary in 2010. He wrote a shorter piece, called "Centenary Fantasia" which is a medley of campfire songs.

The National Scout and Guide Concert Band (NSGCB) was reformed in its current format in 2016 as a joint concert band of The Scout Association and Girlguiding. The NSGCB is managed alongside the NSGSO and the summer courses are run alongside each other.

The reintroduction of the NSGCB in 2016 saw the membership of the NSGSO and NSGCB increase to record numbers, with 128 participants across the two groups in 2019. Participants are all members of The Scout Association and Girlguiding between the ages of 12 and 30.

== Past courses ==
- 2023 - Stourbridge and Birmingham (Concerts at Ruddock Hall)
- 2022 - Stourbridge and Birmingham (Concerts at Coventry Cathedral and Royal Birmingham Conservatoire)
- 2019 - Stourbridge & Birmingham (Concerts at Bramall Music Building)
- 2018 - Stourbridge & Birmingham (Concerts at Royal Birmingham Conservatoire)
- 2017 - Stourbridge & Birmingham (Concerts 4 August at Midland Arts Centre in Birmingham, 5 August at Ruddock Hall, Birmingham)
- 2016 - Stourbridge & Birmingham (Concerts at Ruddock Hall on both nights (29 and 30 August)
- 2015 - Birmingham (Concerts at The Adrian Boult Hall, Birmingham Conservatoire)
- 2014 - Cardiff & Monmouth, Wales
- 2013 - Consett, County Durham (Concerts at the "Youth Village" near Consett on both nights [2 and 3 August])
- 2012 - Leicester
- 2011 - Wokingham, Berkshire (Concerts St Nicolas Church, Newbury (Friday 5 August) and Bearwood College Theatre Saturday 6 August)
- 2010 - Yorkshire (Concerts at Cleckheaton Town Hall, [Friday 6 August] and Bradford Cathedral [Saturday 8 August]). Performances, and premier, of "Centenary Fantasia" at the Girlguiding UK Centenary celebration, "Fusion" at Harewood House, Harrogate.
- 2009 - Cheshire (Concerts at The Grange School Theatre, Hartford [Friday 7 August] and Chester Cathedral [Saturday 8 August])
- 2008 - Musselburgh (Concert at St Mary's Cathedral in Edinburgh as part of the Edinburgh fringe festival)
- 2007 - Ipswich (Concerts in the Corn Exchange, Bury St Edmunds and St.John's Church, Ipswich). A concert to premier "The Great Adventure" was held in the Royal Northern College of Music in Manchester, in October. On 24 November, the NSGSO played at Live 07, the Scout Centenary Celebration at the O2 Arena.
- 2006 - Cardiff Bay (Concerts in Bristol Cathedral and Cardiff University Concert Hall)
- 2005 - Barnard Castle (Concerts in Ripon Cathedral and Elvet Methodist Church)
- 2004 - Berkshire (Estonia Tour, concerts at Rakvere Castle and a Masonic Hall, Tallinn)
- 2003 - Fleetwood (Concerts in Marine Hall Fleetwood and Chorley Town Hall)
- 2002 - Reading (Concerts in Holy Cross Church, Camberley and St George's Chapel, Windsor Castle)
- 2001 - Matlock (Concerts at Worksop and St John's Church, Buxton)
- 2000 - Horsham (Concert at Christ's Hospital and Prague Tour, concerts in Karlovy Vary, Mariánské Lázně and The Church of St Simon and St Jude, Prague)
- 1999 - Belfast (Concerts at Coleraine and Waterfront Hall Belfast)
- 1998 - Durham
- 1997 - Burnham-on-Sea
- 1996 - Cardiff
- 1995 - Norwich (Concerts in Norwich and Ipswich)
- 1994 - Ardingley and tour to Greece
- 1993 - Manchester
- 1992 - Nottingham
- 1991 - Bristol
- 1990 - York and tour to Sweden
- 1989 - Edinburgh
- 1988 - Gravesend and tour to USA
- 1987 - Ipswich
- 1986 - Tour to Austria
- 1985 - Bristol, residence was at Gilwell Park

The original courses, in the 70s, were held at Gilwell Park over New Year. Concerts were held in the Royal College of Music in London.

== See also ==
- List of youth orchestras
