= Angkor National Youth Orchestra =

Cambodian youth orchestra

The Angkor Youth Orchestra (ANYO) (established in 2006 or 2007) is a Cambodian youth orchestra. Its first performance was at the Angkor Wat temple complex. It is the first establishment for orchestral classical music in Cambodia since the Sangkum Reahniyum Era (1953–1970). The Orchestra is supervised by two musicians: Tep Kuntheareth and Ram Daravong.

Under the coordination of the Cambodian cabinet and with the support of Gunma Junior Orchestra and Shinichi Minami, ANYO has been receiving donations and grown gradually to become a symphony orchestra.

The previous headquarters of ANYO were at the Secondary School of Fine Arts (Cambodia). For current headquarters please check the external link.

ANYO is composed of Cambodian teachers (educated in the former USSR) and young musicians with a total number of around 60 or 70. Most of the musicians come from the Royal University of Fine Arts. Others pay to be taught music and are automatically included in ANYO. Instruments include violins, violas, cellos, double basses and clarinets.

ANYO is still recruiting new musicians and receiving new students.

== Performances ==
ANYO holds regular annual performances.

- Angkor Wat Stage
- Water Festival: Channel 9's Alain de Londre Concert 2009
- HRH former queen Norodom Monineath Sihanouk's birthday 2010
- Charity Concert: ANYO 2010
- 7th International Music Festival, Phnom Penh 2010
- 9th International Music Festival, Phnom Penh 2012
- 37th Session of The World Heritage Committee's Meeting Opening Ceremony
- 10th International Music Festival, Phnom Penh 2013
- INTERNATIONAL FRIENDSHIP ORCHESTRA CONCERT 2014, CELEBRATORY CONCERT OF 10th ANNIVERSARY OF KING’S CORONATION. On 27 October
- INTERNATIONAL FRIENDSHIP ORCHESTRA CONCERT On 29th Oct 2014 Performance at Thomanoun Temple Siem Reap
- Youth Music Festival in Lao PDR on 2 November 2014
- International Youth Orchestra in Bangkok (Thailand) on 10 May 2015
- Queen Mother Birthday. Gala Concert 20 June 2016
- Angkor Youth Orchestra & Worldship Orchestra Concert 2017
- Angkor Youth Orchestra & Worldship Orchestra Concert 2018
- Cambodia Opera Project 2018
- Angkor Youth Orchestra & Worldship Orchestra Concert 2019
- Cambodia Opera Project 2019
- Asian Junior Orchestra Concert 2019 in Haiphong, Vietnam
- UK- Cambodia Cultural Exchange Concert 2023, Siem Reap, Cambodia
- Music Festival of Love with Amy (5yr, Pianist), 2023
- International Youth Friendship Concert 2023, Bangkok, Thailand

== Repertoire ==
=== Original compositions ===
- Green City / Green Ville (ទីក្រុងបៃតង)

=== Covers and rearrangements ===
- Natural Barrier (របាំងធម្មជាតិ) : rearrangement of the Korean composition: 라라라 (La La La) by 숙희 (Suki)

== See also ==
- List of youth orchestras
