= Metropolitan Youth Orchestra of Hong Kong =

Hong Kong youth orchestra

- Youth orchestra
- Native name: 香港青少年管弦樂團
- Short name: MYO
- Founded: 2003
- Concert hall: Hong Kong Cultural Centre
- Principal conductor: Synthia Ko
- Website: www.myohk.org

Metropolitan Youth Orchestra of Hong Kong (MYO/MYOHK, Chinese: 香港青少年管弦樂團) is a youth orchestra founded in Hong Kong in 2003. It has collaborated with different artists including Yang Li, Siqing Lu, Nancy Loo, Colleen Lee, Cho-Liang Lin, Michelle Kim and the famous visual theater group Magic Circle Mime Company from the United States. The orchestra gives performances triannually in various venues including the Concert Hall of the Hong Kong Cultural Centre, Tsuen Wan Town Hall and the City Hall, Hong Kong.

In addition to producing music performances, MYO has brought concerts to audience, performing with Korean four-fingered pianist Lee Hee-ah, one-arm violinist Adrian Anantawan and limbless life warrior, Nick Vujicic in 2009 and 2013.

== See also ==
- List of youth orchestras
