= Moldovan National Youth Orchestra =

National youth orchestra of Moldova

- Youth orchestra
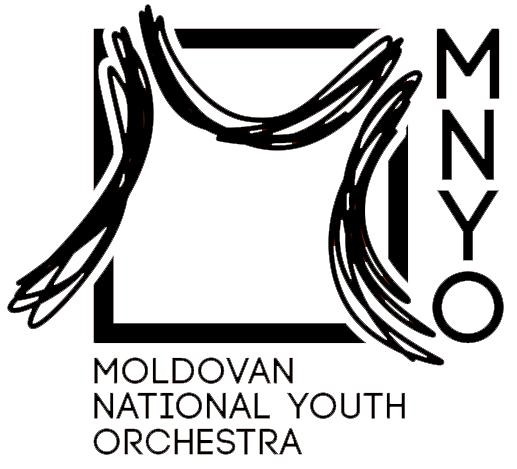
- Native name: Orchestra Națională de Tineret a Moldovei
- Short name: MNYO
- Founded: 2011
- Principal conductor: Gabriel Bebeselea

The Moldovan National Youth Orchestra (MNYO; Romanian: Orchestra Națională de Tineret a Moldovei) is the national youth orchestra of Moldova. Established in 2011 on the initiative of Andriano Marian, it consists of 200 young instrumentalists with an average age of 22. It is an associated member of the European Federation of National Youth Orchestras.

The orchestra made its debut at Young Euro Classic in 2017.

== See also ==
- List of youth orchestras
