= Galway Youth Orchestra =

The Galway Youth Orchestra is a youth orchestra based in Galway in the west of Ireland. First formed in 1982, it is among the "longest-running orchestras in Ireland". The Galway Youth Orchestra (GYO) was formed when a Cork music teacher, Maire Ní Dhuibhir, brought together players from school orchestras in Spiddal, Galway City, Loughrea, Tuam, Salerno, and the Jes.

The GYO is made up of a number of sections, including a Junior Orchestra (for musicians playing at grade 1 Associated Boards or Primary RIAM level), Intermediate Orchestra (for players from grade 3 or 4), and Senior Orchestra (grade 6 standard or higher). As of 2022, it was auditioning for musicians aged between 7 and 20. The GYO also has a jazz orchestra.

== See also ==
- List of youth orchestras
