= National Youth Orchestras of Scotland =

National youth orchestra of Scotland

- Youth orchestra
- Short name: NYOS
- Founded: 1979
- Location: Scotland
- Website: www.nyos.co.uk

The National Youth Orchestras of Scotland (NYOS) is a youth orchestra organization in Scotland.

The National Youth Orchestras of Scotland are a full member of the European UNION of National Youth Orchestras.

== History ==
The first meeting of the provisional governing council of NYOS took place at the Royal Scottish Academy of Music and Drama (now the Royal Conservatoire of Scotland) on Thursday 7 September 1978. The governing council agreed that NYOS should be announced as soon as funding of £8,000 was secured. Following a chance encounter between Colin MacLean, member of the governing council, and Robert Mennie, Director of Public Affairs for British Petroleum Co. Ltd., NYOS was presented with a cheque for £6,000, with BP confirming its sponsorship of the orchestra in its first years. For the year 1979-80, the Carnegie UK Trust contributed £18,000.

The orchestra's first residential course took place in August 1979 at Trinity College, Glenalmond. For performances in Falkirk, Aberdeen, and Dundee, the orchestra was conducted by Nicolas Braithwaite with Nicholas Kraemer as assistant conductor. Reviewing their Aberdeen concert, Matthew Rayment of the Glasgow Herald wrote:

"Can a youth orchestra of real quality be built in a week? Before this concert, I would have thought it impossible but, like everyone else present, I was staggered by what I heard."

The programme for these first summer concerts included The Land of the Mountain and the Flood by Hamish MacCunn, Mozart's Clarinet Concerto, Fantasy Overture from Tchaikovsky's Romeo and Juliet, and Respighi's Pines of Rome.

== NYOS (The National Youth Orchestras of Scotland) ==
NYOS (The National Youth Orchestras of Scotland) is the flagship orchestra of Scotland. Founded in 1979, it is a symphony orchestra for musicians aged 25 and under. Following its two residential courses, the ensemble performs during spring and summer at a variety of venues and festivals as part of the Orchestra's annual national and international tours.

== NYOS Development Orchestra ==
Replacing the former NYOS Junior and Senior Orchestras, NYOS Development is an orchestra for musicians aged 8 and above, and is the second stage on the pathway for aspiring members of NYOS (The National Youth Orchestras of Scotland). Annual membership of NYOS Development includes residential courses in both spring and summer, followed by the opportunity to perform at venues across Scotland.

== NYOS Academy ==
Formerly NYOS Training Ensembles, the NYOS Academy sessions are designed for younger players (around the age of 8–14) to prepare them for entry into a NYOS orchestra. The sessions not only focus on learning repertoire, but also on essentials such as ensemble skills, listening, posture and musicianship, along with advice on audition preparation.

== NYOS Camerata ==
NYOS Camerata is the pre-professional chamber ensemble of NYOS. It comprises current senior and past members of NYOS. Projects include tutoring, delivering workshops, working within Scottish communities, learning about various genres and working with professional musicians. Membership of NYOS Camerata is by invitation only.

== NYOS Engage ==
NYOS Engage is the community-based outreach project that NYOS runs in collaboration with Local Authority Instrumental Music Services. It launched in September 2023 and brings together young people from across the local authority area, where they have the opportunity to learn and perform as an orchestra. NYOS Engage encourages young people to continue to develop within their instrument and progress onto the NYOS classical pathway. NYOS Engage is being piloted in East Lothian in 2023-24 and will move to another Local Authority in future academic years.

== See also ==
- National Youth Orchestra of Great Britain
- National Youth Orchestra of Wales
- Music Schools in Scotland
- List of youth orchestras
