= India National Youth Orchestra =

The India National Youth Orchestra & Chorus is the national youth orchestra and choir of India. The orchestra's aim is to help young musicians to develop their talents and expose them to an orchestral setting. Approximately 150 musicians play in the orchestra. They perform a wide variety of music, notably ones from their home country of India.

== History ==
The orchestra was formed by Vijay Upadhyaya in 2010. He believed that there was a limitation in solo repertoire and gave a lesson to the orchestra such that children of all ages and classes could collaborate effectively. He enlisted children who played Western instruments, making up most of the orchestra. In January 2011, Upadhyaya held auditions followed by a ten-day workshop in Kolkata to train candidates. A concert was held on 26 April 2011 at Sangit Kala Mandir, Kolkata. The program contained string serenades written by Elgar and Tchaikovsky, the Simple Symphony by Benjamin Britten and Concerto in A Minor by Antonio Vivaldi.

== See also ==
- List of youth orchestras
