= NSSO =

NSSO may refer to:

- National Sample Survey Office (India)
- National Schools Symphony Orchestra
- National Security Space Office
