= Arab Youth Philharmonic Orchestra =

Pan-Arab youth orchestra

The Arab Youth Philharmonic Orchestra is the first pan-Arab youth orchestra, created in 2006. It has so far given concerts in Syria and Germany. The major aim of the orchestra is to encourage pan-Arab cultural exchange and promote global cultural understanding while preparing the young musicians to their professional careers.

== History ==
The first session was held in July 2006, in Damascus, Syria. Nearly 100 young musicians from a lot of different Arab countries, aged between 18 and 26 years old rehearsed in the Syrian capital with workshop professors and German conductor Walter L. Mik, and gave two concerts supporting the Palestinian and Lebanese people. The concert programme included works by Marcel Khalife, Gamal Abdel-Rahim and Antonín Dvořák.

In 2007, the orchestra gathered again, in Germany this time. Young musicians from Egypt, Syria, Lebanon, Tunisia, Algeria and Sudan took part in the project. After ten days of workshops and rehearsals, the orchestra gave its European premiere in Bonn, followed by two other concerts in Bayreuth. The programme included a commissioned work by Algerian composer Salim Dada, Felix Mendelssohn's Italian Symphony and Robert Schumann's Cello Concerto (with Egyptian cellist Mahmoud Saleh).

== See also ==
- List of youth orchestras
