= Danish Youth Ensemble =

National youth orchestra of Denmark

- Youth orchestra
- Native name: Det danske Ungdomsensemble
- Short name: DUEN
- Founded: 2004
- Principal conductor: Morten Ryelund
- Website: duen-orkester.dk

The Danish Youth Ensemble (DUEN; Danish: Det danske Ungdomsensemble) is the national youth orchestra of Denmark. It consists of 25 string players, selected from all over Denmark.

Founded by the Danish Radio in 2004 as the Danish Radio Youth Ensemble (DRUEN). It became independent in 2011, as DR could no longer afford to fund the project. It was founded with the goal of giving young musicians a chance to develop their skills, alongside introducing other youth to classical music. The performances, therefore, were not limited to traditional concert halls, but also occurred in schools across the country. Additionally, DUEN has played at Vega, Roskilde Festival, and P3 Guld, and seek to combine classical and rhythmic music.

It is a member of the European Federation of National Youth Orchestras.

== See also ==
- List of youth orchestras
