= CBOI =

CBOI may refer to:

- Cross Border Orchestra of Ireland
- Central Bank of Ireland
