= Melbourne String Ensemble =

The Melbourne String Ensemble (MSE) is a youth orchestra consisting of secondary and tertiary students. The MSE focuses on developing the ensemble and musical leadership skills of its members.

The MSE has an annual program typically consisting of a benchmark concert (featuring MSE alumni as soloists), Concerto concert, and a chamber concert, as well as an international tour every three years. MSE also tours and performs jointly with interstate and overseas youth orchestras. In June 2015 MSE toured Germany and played at the Australia Embassy Germany's courtyard in Berlin to "present an exquisite selection of string pieces from their repertoire ... In addition to works by Vivaldi and Haydn, Australian composers Richard Meale and Sarah Hopkins featured with attractive works."

== Directors ==
- Fintan Murphy – senior lecturer and co-ordinator of strings at the Monash University School of Music.
- Caitlin Williams – president.

== See also ==
- List of youth orchestras
