= WJO =

WJO may refer to:

- Widespread Depression Jazz Orchestra
- Wiener Jeunesse Orchester
