= Hong Kong Festival Orchestra =

Youth orchestra and choir organization

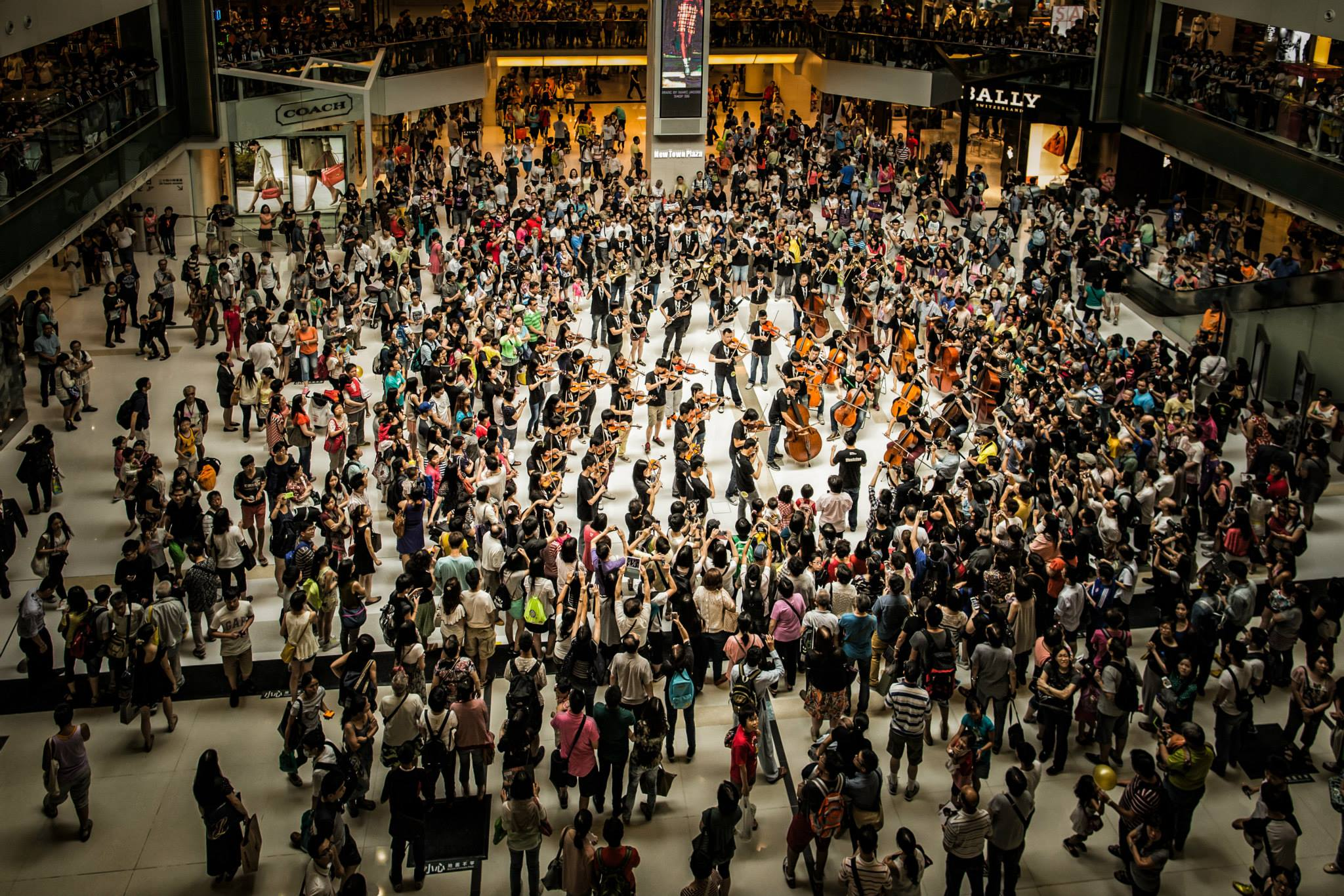
HKFO performs an "Ode to Joy" flashmob at Shatin New Town Plaza.

The Hong Kong Festival Orchestra (HKFO) is one of the biggest youth orchestra and choir organisations in Hong Kong.

== History ==
Founded in 2009 by Sean Li, HKFO is now one of the largest youth orchestra groups in Hong Kong with over 300 instrumentalists and choristers and five conductors of different backgrounds and experiences.

HKFO was initially established in response to the boom of musical education in Hong Kong that began in the 1980s. With the staggering increase of Hong-Kong-born young musical professionals and semi-professionals educated locally and internationally returning to their home city of Hong Kong by the 2000s, the orchestra was set up as a platform where young musical professionals can build their careers, reconnect with their common past, share and learn from one another in a friendly and rewarding atmosphere.

== Membership ==
While HKFO does not have an official age restriction, the average age of its members range from 13 to 30 years of age, chosen through highly competitive annual auditions held locally and online. Prospective members may apply for membership as an instrumentalist, chorister or intern.

== Organisation's vision ==
HKFO positions itself differently from conventional orchestras in the region in that the orchestra focuses heavily on conversion of non-classical-music-listeners to classical-music-listeners. Apart from giving conventional performances, the orchestra also engages in audience-interacting activities and cross-media performances, ranging from drama, comedy, popular music and other art forms. In 2013, HKFO hosted the largest choral-orchestral flash mob in Hong Kong.

The orchestra regularly collaborates with internationally and locally renowned artists, including in the past, conductor Vassily Sinaisky, cellists Jian Wang and Trey Lee, pianists Yundi Li, Aristo Sham, Kajeng Wong, Dr. Helen Cha, Dr. Mary Wu and Rachel Cheung; violinist Leung Kin Fung; saxophonist Timothy Sun; violist Born Lau; popular singer George Lam, and comedian Jim Chim.

The orchestra mainly gives its annual performances in the summer in various venues including the Hong Kong Cultural Centre Concert Hall and the Hong Kong City Hall Concert Hall.

== See also ==
- List of youth orchestras
