= Spanish National Youth Orchestra =

The Spanish National Youth Orchestra (Joven Orquesta Nacional de España, abbreviation JONDE) is a Spanish youth orchestra.

It is a member of the European Federation of National Youth Orchestras.

== See also ==
- Madrid Academic Orchestra
- List of youth orchestras
