= National Batuta Foundation =

Colombian music-education system

Fundación Nacional Batuta
- Formation: 1991; 35 years ago
- Purpose: Music education
- Website: www.fundacionbatuta.org

The National Batuta Foundation (Spanish: Fundación Nacional Batuta), commonly referred to as Batuta, is a Colombian music education system modelled on Venezuela's El Sistema.

== Origin and development ==
Batuta was created in 1991 by the national government of president César Gaviria as a special project of the first lady Ana Milena Muñoz Gómez with assistance of José Antonio Abreu. The majority (70%) of funding comes from the government with the additional funding from private companies. The principal sponsor is Fundacion Bolivar Davivienda. It was the first such programme outside Venezuela.

Batuta was modelled on Venezuela's El Sistema, aiming to offer a musical education to all, particularly those from disadvantaged backgrounds who would not otherwise have the opportunity to do so. Key differences with El Sistema include the use of private as well as public finance, greater use of traditional Colombian musical instruments instead of prioritising orchestral instruments, and a greater focus on social issues and reconciliation. Its objective has been to reach the most vulnerable areas and it is especially focussed on communities that have been victims of the Colombian conflict including people forcibly displaced by the violence. This meant, for example, that the programme had to include psychotherapy and counselling for children with trauma. Former Batuta director Juan Antonio Cuellar said that "Social action is the mission; music is the tool." Helena Barreto Reyes, executive director of Filarmónica Joven de Colombia, said that "With Batuta, music is seen as a strong tool for social development and healing. It involves the families just as much as the players" while assistant conductor of the Filarmónica Joven de Colombia, Carlos Andres Botero Botero, said that "Batuta is seen as more about the journey towards performances than performance itself, living up to its slogan “Transforming lives through music”". In 2015 it was said that 65% of Batuta participants had been victims of the armed conflict.

== Educational model ==
In 2018 there were about 47,000 students taking part in Batuta in 112 municipalities in all of Colombia's 32 departments and by 2020 over 500,000 children and young people had taken part in Batuta's musical programmes since its launch in 1991. After Venezuela, it is the largest such programme in the world. It focusses particularly on younger children in non-orchestral settings, who learn music through singing and the Orff approach using instruments such as percussion and recorders. Children can start in Batuta bébé at 2–6 years old, followed by playing Orff instruments from 6–14 years old; from 11 years children can learn orchestral instruments and play in orchestras. Batuta's model focusses on Colombian folk music written for Orff instruments, specifically to build national and community pride. Students play instruments and music styles associated with specific ethnic groups or regions, such as the chonto wood marimba and vallenato music, and there are student exchanges between different parts of the country. Batuta has created youth orchestras for children aged 13–18 in Bogota, Cali and Medellin. Many students have graduated from Batuta to play professionally in major orchestras in Colombia and worldwide.

== Colombian Youth Philharmonic ==
Colombian Youth Philharmonic
- Youth orchestra
- Native name: Filarmónica Joven de Colombia
- Founded: 2009
- Principal conductor: Andrés Orozco-Estrada
- Website: www.fundacionbolivardavivienda.org/filarmonicajovendecolombia/

The Colombian Youth Philharmonic (Spanish: Filarmónica Joven de Colombia) was established in 2009 for young people aged 16 to 24, through cooperation with Batuta and the Youth Orchestra of the Americas and also with support from the Fundación Bolivar Davivienda. 80% of the orchestra's musicians come from Batuta. The orchestra toured Europe in 2017, making its debut at Young Euro Classic and again in 2019, under the baton of Andrés Orozco-Estrada; they have also played in Miami, Houston and São Paulo. In December 2020 they performed a joint concert with the band Morat and in 2021 will be playing Das Rheingold with the National Symphony Orchestra of Colombia again under Andrés Orozco-Estrada.

The Colombian Youth Philharmonic is an associated member of the European Federation of National Youth Orchestras.

== Music for Reconciliation ==
One of Batuta's key programmes is Music for Reconciliation, which is aimed at victims of the armed conflict and is entirely financed by the government. According to research carried out by the Regional Center for Coffee and Business Studies in 2008, children who participated in this programme felt that it taught them values of coexistence, produced happiness and expand their support and social networks. The programme has contributed to repairing the social fabric in families and communities. In 2017 Fundación Nacional Batuta received the Fair Saturday award for "its great commitment to the generation of spaces of reconciliation and coexistence through the use of culture and education as tools for social development, for transforming the lives of thousands of children and teenagers with music education, and for promoting the music itself as a bastion of reconciliation and construction of an inspiring future in Colombia".

== See also ==
- List of youth orchestras
