= Patrick Thomas (conductor) =

Australian conductor

Patrick Alan Thomas AM, MBE (1 June 1932 – 1 August 2017) was an Australian conductor.

For a period of almost 35 years he conducted hundreds of performances across Australia in just about every centre where the various state symphony orchestras ventured, and introduced music to virtually a whole generation of young Australians through his popular and distinctive schools concerts. He held a succession of important posts with four of Australia's major ABC orchestras and the specially created position of ABC Federal Conductor-in-Residence as well as conducting the Australian Opera and the Australian Ballet. He also conducted the ABC's radio chorus, the Adelaide Singers.

Overseas, he appeared in 12 countries as Guest Conductor of such orchestras as the Moscow Philharmonic Orchestra, the Hallé Orchestra, Bavarian Radio Orchestra, Polish National Radio Symphony Orchestra, Munich Philharmonic, BBC Symphony Orchestra, CBC Symphony Orchestra, Prague Radio Symphony Orchestra, and many others in New Zealand, the Czech Republic, Bulgaria and South Africa. Other facets of his diverse career included those of concert, radio and television presenter and interviewer.

== Biography ==
Thomas was born in Brisbane, and attended Eagle Junction State School in Clayfield. In August 1944, at age 12, he attended his first major evening orchestral concert, when Eugene Ormandy conducted at Brisbane City Hall in four concerts designed to boost the war effort. Thomas requested, and a few days later received, Ormandy's autograph, and from then on set his sights on becoming a conductor. Already recognised as a young flautist of exceptional ability, Patrick Thomas enrolled as Sub-Junior student at Brisbane State High School, located in South Brisbane, Queensland, in 1947. Later that year, as a 14-year-old, he played third flute at the first Queensland Symphony Orchestra (QSO) performance, on 26 March 1947, when the new 45-member ensemble under guest conductor Percy Code introduced Queenslanders to their own professional symphony orchestra.

In 1963, the ABC's acting federal director of music, Joseph Post, gave him a conducting audition and less than two years later Thomas became director of the ABC's Adelaide Singers. From there he had a year's stint during 1968, as Conductor of the Tasmanian Symphony Orchestra before choosing to return to Adelaide.

In 1973 he became the QSO's first – and, to date, only – homegrown chief conductor. He stayed in that post until 1977. He decided to increasingly offer 20th-century composers as a way of developing a broadened approach on the part of the audiences to diverse modern repertoire, plus a more responsive and capable facility from the orchestra. Patrick Thomas co-established a successful Modern Music Forum in Brisbane.

Regularly conducting the Sydney Symphony Orchestra including on its international tours, and Melbourne Symphony Orchestra, Thomas's glamorous concert engagements outside Queensland were in stark contrast to the harsh performance conditions which he and his 65-piece orchestra endured at home. Able to fill in at short notice when a scheduled conductor cancelled, Thomas became the ABC's Sydney-based conductor-in-residence. Thomas established an international reputation, especially in Europe where he was offered coveted return engagements by several leading ensembles. But his dedication to family and his home country meant that his career remained based in Australia. As the final director of the ABC Sinfonia, he became a casualty of the structural reforms of the mid-1980s that led eventually to the complete divestment of the orchestras from the ABC.

As a writer, his later work included an autobiography (Upbeats and Downbeats: A Conductor's Life), several hundred poems, a booklet of career anecdotes, a published reference text (Overture to Conducting), as well as articles and scripts for radio stations 2MBS FM and ABC Classic FM. He died in August 2017 at the age of 85.

== Honours and awards ==
Thomas was appointed a Member of the Order of the British Empire (MBE) in 1978 and made an Honorary Life Member of the Fellowship of Australian Composers in 1998, a first for an Australian conductor. In 2005 he became a Patron of the Music Teachers' Association of New South Wales. In 2014 he was named a Member of the Order of Australia (AM).

=== Bernard Heinze Memorial Award ===
The Sir Bernard Heinze Memorial Award is given to a person who has made an outstanding contribution to music in Australia.

Year	Nominee / work	Award	Result	Ref.
1989	Patrick Thomas	Sir Bernard Heinze Memorial Award	awarded	

== Sources ==
- ‘’24 Hours’’, ABC, 4 August 2002
- Buzacott, Martin (24 March 2007). "Proud history lives on". The Courier-Mail. Archived from the original on 11 August 2011.
- Ku-Ring-Gai Philharmonoic Orchestra
