= Greek Youth Symphony Orchestra =

National youth orchestra of the Greece

- Youth orchestra
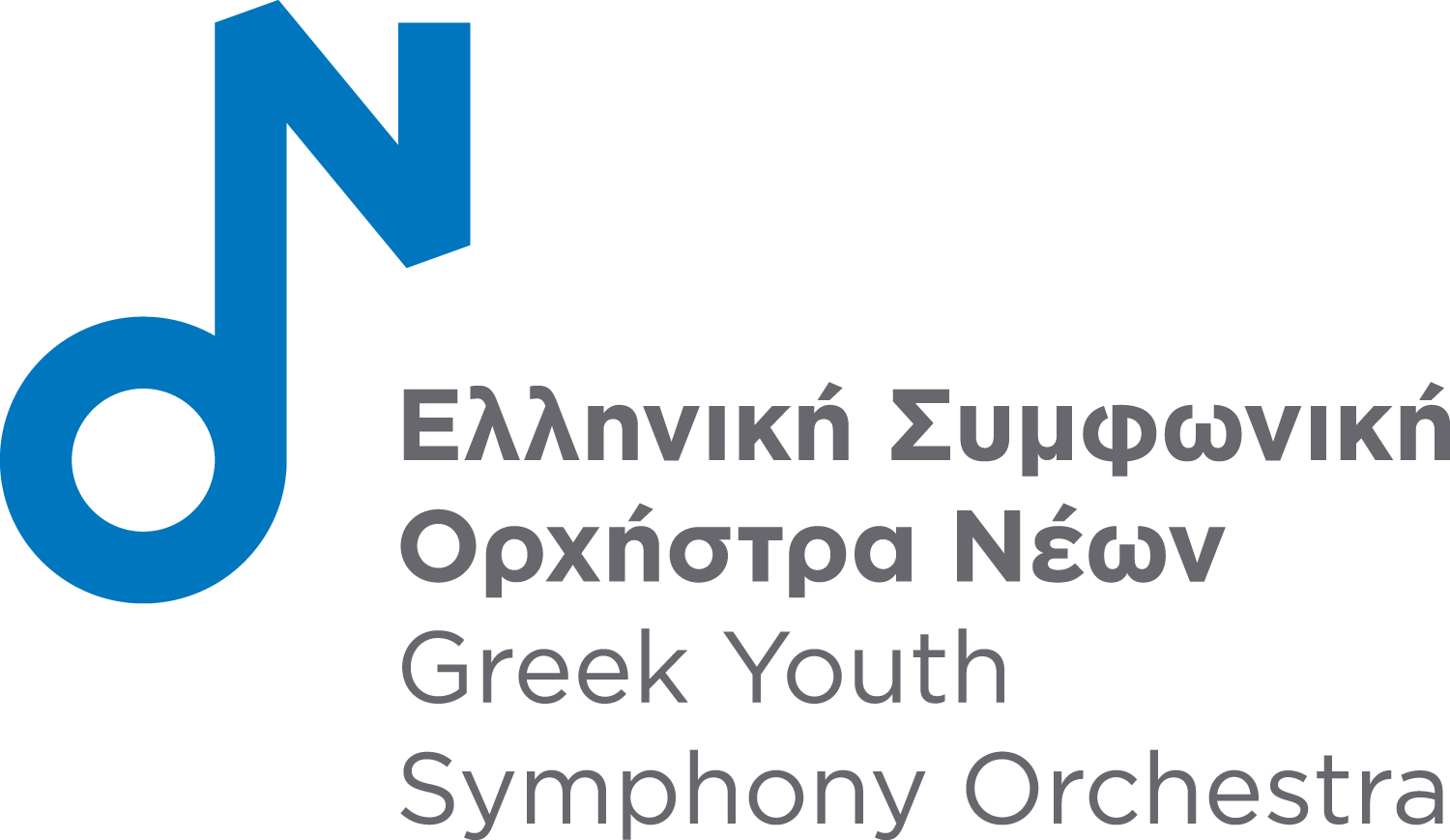
- Native name: Ελληνική Συμφωνική Ορχήστρα Νέων
- Short name: ELSON / GYSO
- Founded: 2017
- Location: Athens
- Music director: Dionysis Grammenos
- Website: elson.gr

The Greek Youth Symphony Orchestra (GYSO; Greek: Ελληνική Συμφωνική Ορχήστρα Νέων, ELSON) is the national youth orchestra of Greece, founded in 2017 by conductor Dionysis Grammenos. Since October 2020 the GYSO is Orchestra in Residence at Megaron the Athens Concert Hall and it is a member of the European Federation of National Youth Orchestras.

During its three years of existence, more than 100 Greek musicians have been selected, after auditions, to perform with the orchestra, and over 1,500 young people have attended its educational activities. So far, the GYSO has given nine concerts in Greece, featuring world-class soloists, and two composers have been commissioned to write new works for the Orchestra. It has also been invited to perform at the opening concert of the Young Euro Classic Festival at the Berlin Konzerthaus.

The Greek Youth Symphony Orchestra operates with funding from the John S. Latsis Public Benefit Foundation and is supported by The Hellenic Initiative (THI).

== See also ==
- List of youth orchestras
