= Norwegian National Youth Orchestra =

Ungdomssymfonikerne

The Norwegian National Youth Orchestra
- Youth orchestra
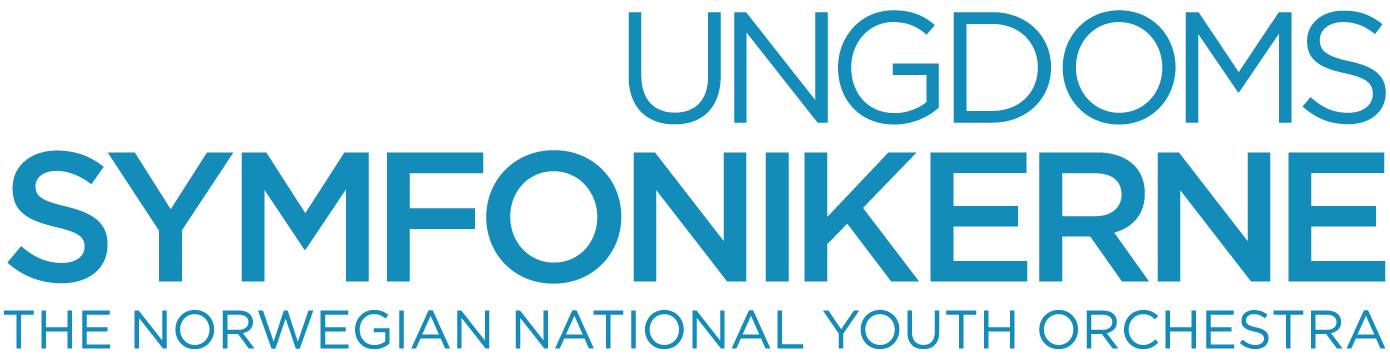
- Native name: Ungdomssymfonikerne
- Founded: 1973
- Location: Oslo, Norway
- Principal conductor: Johannes Gustavsson
- Website: www.en.ungsymf.no

The Norwegian National Youth Orchestra (Norwegian: Ungdomssymfonikerne) is the national youth orchestra of Norway, founded 1973 in Oslo.

The orchestra has played with conductors and soloists including Juanjo Mena, Vasily Petrenko, Christian Vásquez, Andrew Manze, Leif Ove Andsnes, Truls Mørk, Solveig Kringlebotn, Håkan Hardenberger, Barbara Hendricks, Henning Kraggerud, Håvard Gimse, Arve Tellefsen, Elisabeth Norberg-Schulz and Ole Edvard Antonsen. It has appeared at Young Euro Classic numerous times.

It is a member of the European Federation of National Youth Orchestras.

== See also ==
- List of youth orchestras
