= Colne Valley Youth Orchestra =

Youth orchestra in Essex, England

The Colne Valley Youth Orchestra is a youth orchestra in Colchester, England, founded in 1981 by Nigel Hildreth. It provides a non-auditioning classical music provider for young people aged 7 to 18. As of 2021, Hildreth continues to run the musical direction, and the honorary President of the orchestra is Damon Albarn.

== General ==
The Colne Valley Training Orchestra includes children aged 7 to 13 who have passed an ABRSM exam in their orchestral instrument. When they have advanced sufficiently, the CVTO members move up into the main orchestra, the youth orchestra.

As a youth orchestra, every musician in the CVYO is below the age of 19, with the youngest member being 10 years old. There are around 60 members in total. The standard of performance is high, with new players having achieved typically Grade 5 or 6 ABRSM, and the orchestra frequently performs in public, with much money being raised for charity. The orchestra holds residential weekends twice a year, and also tours during the summer, at the end of July. Past tours have involved concerts in Germany, Italy, France, Belgium, Sweden, the Netherlands, and the Czech Republic. The orchestra has broadcast over BBC Essex and appeared on German National Television on a show devoted to youth orchestras.

== Repertoire ==
The orchestra's repertoire is varied, ranging from symphonic pieces to Baroque chamber pieces to modern film music and jazz. Recently, the orchestra has tackled the Unfinished Symphony (No. 8 in B minor) by Schubert, Vaughan Williams' Fantasy on English Folk Songs, the Jupiter Symphony by Mozart, as well as the 'Raiders March' by John Williams, 'Pirates of the Caribbean' by Klaus Badelt.

== Concerts ==
The orchestra plays in several concerts throughout the academic year, culminating in a Gala Concert when the entire orchestra performs the whole of its repertoire as a formal evening, which is the older members' last event. Other staple concerts include the Teddy Bears' Picnic in late January/early February, held in Colchester's Moot Hall, a Strawberry Tea concert in late June in which the CVYO and the training orchestra play together; the Music in Miniature concert in which a number of chamber items are often performed and in recent years the orchestra has been asked to provide entertainment for Colchester's Oyster Feast.

== Conductors ==
Nigel Hildreth, the Musical Director, is also Head of Performing Arts at the Colchester Sixth Form College. He founded the CVYO orchestra, and is helped by a committee of parents. He studied at the University of Sheffield, and has been teaching music in Essex for 25 years. He is known also for his compositions, including three symphonies, two concertos, as well as numerous chamber pieces, and he has also arranged many pieces for performance by the CVYO. In 1996 he was presented with the 'Arts For All' award for his service to the town of Colchester. The Queen awarded him an MBE for services to music education in 2012. The current assistant musical director is Jonathan Abbott.

== See also ==
- List of youth orchestras
