= Junge Deutsche Philharmonie =

National youth orchestra of Germany

- Youth orchestra
- Short name: JDPh
- Founded: 1974
- Location: Frankfurt
- Principal conductor: Jonathan Nott
- Website: jdph.de

The Junge Deutsche Philharmonie (JDPh; Young German Philharmonic) is one of the national youth orchestras of Germany. Unlike the Bundesjugendorchester, which is composed of pre-university students aged 14–19, the Junge Deutsche Philharmonie consists of conservatory students up to the age of 28. It was founded in 1974 and is based in Frankfurt.

Conductors and soloists that appeared with the orchestra include Rudolf Barshai, George Benjamin, Pierre Boulez, Renaud Capuçon, Péter Eötvös, Julia Fischer, Martin Fröst, Beat Furrer, Sol Gabetta, Heiner Goebbels, Martin Helmchen, Janine Jansen Sergey Khachatryan, Truls Mørk, Christiane Oelze, Enno Poppe, Wolfgang Rihm, José María Sánchez-Verdú, Christian Stadelmann, Christian Tetzlaff, Carolin Widmann, Jörg Widmann, Lothar Zagrosek and Hans Zender.

Jonathan Nott has been the orchestra's principal conductor since 2014.

It is a member of the European Federation of National Youth Orchestras.

== See also ==
- List of youth orchestras
