= National Youth Orchestra of Slovakia =

Slovak Youth Orchestra
- Youth orchestra
- Native name: Slovenský mládežnícky orchester
- Short name: SMO
- Founded: 2016
- Location: Bratislava, Slovakia
- Website: hc.sk/smo

The National Youth Orchestra of Slovakia (SMO, Slovak: Slovenský mládežnícky orchester) was founded in 2016 in Bratislava, and it consists of 80 musicians aged 16 to 28.

The orchestra is a member of the European Federation of National Youth Orchestras. It performed at Young Euro Classic 2019.

== See also ==
- List of youth orchestras
