= Vancouver Youth Symphony Orchestra =

Canadian youth orchestra

The Vancouver Youth Symphony Orchestra (VYSO) is youth orchestra located in Vancouver, British Columbia, Canada. The VYSO operates out of St. James Community Square, and is a non-profit organization that performs a series of concerts within the Metro Vancouver region. It also provides musical education and development for young musicians.

== History ==
The Vancouver Youth Symphony Orchestra was founded in 1930 by R. Cyril Haworth as the Vancouver Little Orchestra. It was originally directed by the students themselves until the arrival of its first music director, George Coutts. In 1938, the orchestra became attached to the Vancouver Symphony Orchestra and was renamed the Vancouver Junior Symphony Orchestra. In 1945, a reorganization resulted in the orchestra's independence from the VSO and was renamed the Vancouver Youth Symphony Orchestra.

In 1990, Pam Chambers wrote a 32-page history of the orchestra, titled Sixty Years of Music Making: The Vancouver Youth Symphony Orchestra 1930–1990.

== VYSO Orchestras ==
The VYSO is made up of four student orchestras, each representing different age groups. Entrance to each of the four orchestras is through competitive auditions.

- Debut Orchestra, Designed for string musicians aged 8 to 11, who have little or no previous ensemble experience.
- Junior Orchestra, Provides training in orchestral skills for more experienced string musicians of ages generally ranging from 10 to 13 years old.
- Intermediate Orchestra, A full orchestra offering training for musicians of junior and senior high school age.
- Senior Orchestra, A full orchestra for advanced musicians up to 22 years of age.
