= Wiener Jeunesse Orchester =

National youth orchestra of Austria

- Youth orchestra
- Short name: WJO
- Founded: 1987
- Location: Vienna, Austria
- Music director: Herbert Böck
- Website: www.wjo.at

The Wiener Jeunesse Orchester (WJO, Vienna Youth Orchestra) is the national youth orchestra of Austria, founded 1987 in Vienna. It consists of students between 18 and 26 years of age from all Austrian states.

The WJO has worked with conductors including Atso Almila, John Axelrod, Asher Fisch, Valery Gergiev, Manfred Honeck, Rupert Huber, Lutz Köhler, Gérard Korsten, Daniel Meyer, Andrés Orozco-Estrada, Andrea Quinn and Johannes Wildner.

It is a member of the European Federation of National Youth Orchestras.

== See also ==
- List of youth orchestras
