= Baltic Sea Philharmonic =

European orchestra

Baltic Sea Philharmonic (formerly Baltic Youth Philharmonic) is an orchestra which consists of musicians from countries around the Baltic Sea.

Kristjan Järvi is its founding conductor and held the position of artistic director until 2024. During which time he together with his production company Sunbeam Productions created innovating concepts that led to many international collaborations.

The orchestra was established in 2008 by the initiative of Thomas Hummel.

In 2015, the orchestra was awarded with European Culture Prize by the European Culture Foundation 'Pro Europe'.

In 2016, the orchestra was named to Baltic Sea Philharmonic.

It is an associated member of the European Federation of National Youth Orchestras.

== See also ==
- List of youth orchestras
