= National Schools Symphony Orchestra =

The National Schools Symphony Orchestra – known for short as the NSSO – is a youth orchestra composed of secondary school students living in and around the United Kingdom.

It was founded in 1995 and has several distinguished patrons including Patrick Doyle and Sir John Eliot Gardiner.

== See also ==
- List of youth orchestras
