= Salim Dada =

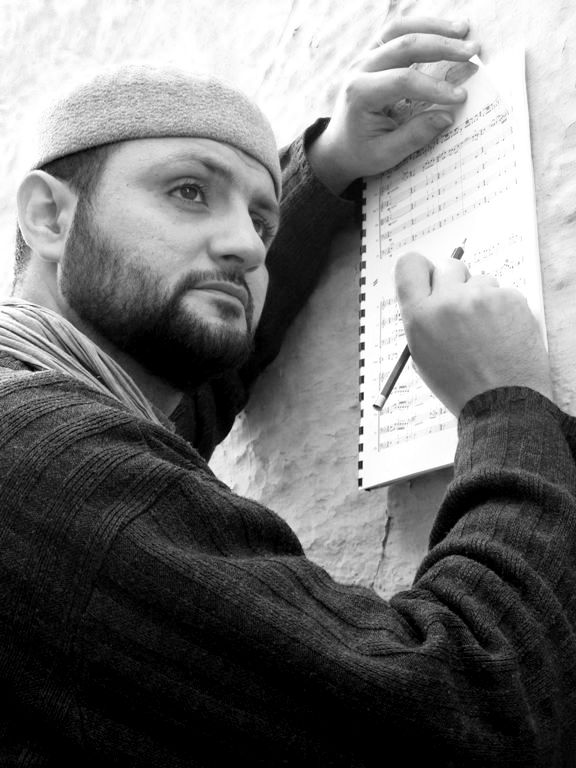
Salim Dada

Salim Dada (Arabic: سليم دادة, born 7 May 1975) is an Algerian composer, musician, and musicologist.

== Biography ==
Dada was born in Laghouat.

Salim Dada learned to play classical guitar and the oud, contrabass, mandole, kwitra and percussion. He also studied harmony, Western and Eastern musical theory, and presented several works for guitar solo and small ensembles. Between 2002 and 2005 he prepared a cycle of musical writing (harmony, counterpoint and analysis) in school of distance learning polyphonies with the composer Jean-Luc Kuczynski in France, and the Institute National Supérieur de la Musique in Algiers in the class of the academician Golnara Bouyagoub. He also studied medicine and obtained a medical degree from the Faculty of Medicine in Algiers in 2005.

His nomination in 2007 as a Composer-in-Residence with the Algerian National Symphony Orchestra allowed him to create seven compositions and conduct 30 concerts in two years. The music catalogue of Salim Dada spans twenty symphonic works, a dozen scores for strings and chamber music and numerous pages for solo musicians (guitar, piano, harpsichord, saxophone, violin, etc.). He also has composed for voice and instruments of traditional Arab music and for film and theatre.

A composer-member of SACEM, his compositions won awards in competitions and were presented at events such as the 57th Bayreuth Festival Junger Künstler in 2007, festival of the Euro-Mediterranean Youth Orchestra in Damascus in 2008, the 7th Arab composers festival "Arab Perspectives" in Cairo, Settembre Musica "MITO 2009" at Milano, "PAN 6" in Amsterdam. In 2010, Terrassa48's tour in Catalonia "Enmig de terra; la Mediterrània", 3rd International Festival of Cultural Diversity at UNESCO, Paris, 4th Perinaldo Festival and Festival “Est Ovest” in Italy. In 2011, "Hommage à la Méditerranée" by Divertimento at the Cité de la Musique and festival "Label Sorbonne" in Paris. In 2012, "Ice Breaker VI" in Seattle and the opening of the 2012–13 concert season at the Cité de la Musique of Paris for celebration of the fiftieth anniversary of the independence of Algeria.

His works have been played by orchestras and ensembles such as the Orchestre Symphonique National Algérien, Arab Youth Philharmonic Orchestra, Euro-Mediterranean Youth Orchestra, Cairo Symphony Orchestra, Qatar Philharmonic Orchestra, Orchestre Symphonique Divertimento, Orquestra Terrassa48 de Cataluña, Calefax Reed Quintet of the Netherlands, Seattle Chamber Players, Ensemble Conductus di Merano, Xenia Ensemble and the Fiarì Ensemble from Torino, plus the Orchestra del Perinaldo Festival, Orchestra Internacional “Pequeñas Huellas” di Niños para la Paze, and Conservatorio di Torino.

Considered by the press as a bridge between the West and the East, the music of Salim Dada is often referred to as a message of peace and dialogue between the Arab-Muslim world and Europe.

== Compositions ==
=== Symphonic works ===
- Tableaux d'une vie arabe, symphonic poem (2012), 10’
- Afri, African rhapsody for large orchestra (2012), 18’
- Ouverture Dzaïr, for orchestra (2011), 7’
- Hal Dara, Mouwashah for Arab singer, oud, douf & string orchestra (poem by 13th-century poet Ibnou Sahl Al-Andaloussi) (2010), 12’
- Ettawous (The Peacock), symphonic dance (2010), 4’
- Miniatures Algériennes, five pictures for string orchestra or string quartet (2010), 18’
1. Aurore de Djurdjura
2. Danse Zaydan
3. Crépuscule sur la baie d'Alger
4. Danse de la jument
5. Soirée au Hoggar
- Lounga Dil, symphonic dance (2009), 8’
- Dance of Blue Man, symphonic dance for ney & orchestra (2008), 5’
- Bent Essahra (Girl of Sahara), symphonic dance for ney & orchestra (2008), 4’
- Love Song, for string orchestra (2008), 8’
- Freedom Dance, sirto nekriz for string orchestra (2007), 4’45
- Ashwaq (Passions), Sama'i nahawound for orchestra (2007), 9’
- Lounga Nahawound, symphonic dance (2007), 7’
- Fantaisie sur un air Andalou, for flute & orchestra (2006), 8’
- Souvenirs d'enfance, symphonic poem (2004), 7’

=== Chamber music ===
- Lisse Strié, quintet for flute, clarinet, violin, cello & percussions (2012), 7'
- Raqsat al-Faras (Dance of Mare), for flute and harp (2010), 5’
- Zaydan Dance, for woodwind quintet: oboe, clarinet, soprano saxophone, bass clarinet & bassoon(2009), 4’
- Fine dell’ inizio, string quartet no. 1 (2009), 11’
1. La fine
2. L’inizio
- Conversations, 12 duets for two violinists (2008 - 2009), 22’
1. Accordage
2. Comme un tango!
3. Philatélie
4. Canon Zaydan
5. Troubadours
6. Caresses et Grattages
7. Accords et des-Accords
8. Musette ...
9. Et amusette!
10. Vagues et cascades
11. Contrepoids
12. Fantasia et Baroud
- Amusette, for violin and piano (2006), 4’
- Histoire de la montagne d'olivier, octuor for guitar, flute, oboe, clarinet, bassoon, violin, viola et violoncello (2006), 6’
- Gharnata, for guitar duo (2001), 6’

=== Solo works ===
- Vagues et Cascades, daily exercise for harpsichord! (2012), 1’
- Istihlal, prelude for guitar (2011), 1’
- Taqsim, improvisation for alto saxophone (2011), 6’
- Zammara, Libyan's dance & improvisation for piano (2010), 5’
- Sama'i, for harpsichord (2010), 9’
- Miniatures Algériennes, five pictures for piano (2009), 15’
- Taqsim nahawound, for guitar (2005), 6’
- Au chemin du retour, for guitar (2005), 4’
- En souvenir de Bach, for harpsichord (2004), 1’30
- Nostalgie, waltz for guitar (2004), 3’30
- Histoire de la montagne d'olivier, for guitar (2004), 4’
- Ya Qalbi (Oh! my heart), for guitar (2003), 4’
- Musette, for guitar (2001), 1’40
- Hommage à J.S. Bach, for guitar (2001), 6’ 30
- Tendresse, for guitar (2000), 3’
- Chôros, for guitar (1999), 3’
- La Ballade méditerranéene, dance & improvisation for guitar (1999), 3-11’
- Trois Pièces pour guitare (1999), 5’
- Hésitation
- Berceuse
- Tournade

=== Takht arabi and traditional instruments ===
- Waslat al-Ashwaq, suite for vocal soloists, chorus and Arabic ensemble (2005-6), 60’

Arabic poetry by Muslims sufist poets fromVIII° to XV°: Hassan Bnou Thabet/ Ibrahim Bnou Ali Al-Housri/ Ibnou Sahl Al-Andaloussi/ Safiyou’eddine Al-Helli/ Lissanou’eddine Bnou’al-Khatib/ Ibnou Nabateh Al-Misri.

1. Sama‘i Nahawound
2. Mouwashah Agharrou Alayhi
3. Mouwashah Ya Hal Bakaitou
4. Taqasim: oud, qanoun
5. Mawwal
6. Mouwashah Hal Dara
7. Lounga Nahawound
8. Mouwashah Shouqqa Djaiboul Layli
9. Mouwashah Jadakal Ghaythou
10. Mouwashah Ma Massa
- Sama‘i Rahat al-Arwah, for Arab traditional ensemble (2006), 6’
- Malentendu, for violin, oud, guitar & contrabass (2000), 5’
- Dhikra (Memory), for Arab traditional ensemble (1998), 4’

=== Soundtracks ===
- Ben Boulaïd (2008), film music for orchestra (2008), 55’

Directed by Ahmed Rachedi, produced by Ministry for Moudjahidines and Mycene Balkis Films (Algeria)

- Hamlet Without Hamlet, music for theatre (2008),14’

Arabic text by Khaza’al al-Majidi, scenography by Hamza Djaballah, produced by Annawares troupe (Algeria)

=== Music for children ===
- Marcia per la pace, hymn for child soloists, mixed choir and young symphonic orchestra (2009), 5’

Text written by Salim Dada in Arabic, Italian & French, translate to English, Spanish and others languages.

- To my Fatherland, mini operetta with ballet for child soloists, mixed choir and orchestra (2004), 18’

Text written by Lalmi Hadbaoui

1. Colors of the Flag
2. You Algeria
3. I Sing

=== Didactics ===
- Conversations, 12 duets for two violinists (to see chamber music)
- Pieces for guitar & guitar duet (since 1998)
- Arrangements for guitar solo and guitar duets of classical repertory: De Visée, Sanz, Bach, Chopin, Aguado, Tárrega (since 1998)
- Arrangements for guitar solo and guitar duets of traditional music and popular music from Algeria, Arab world and Orient (since 1998)

== Musicology ==
- 2010-2011: Maîtrise degree in Music and Musicology at the University Paris IV Sorbonne: Traditions musicale en Azerbaïdjan : héritage et évolution, 100 p.
- 2011-2012: Master's Research degree in Music and Musicology at the University Paris IV Sorbonne: Polyphonie orchestrale et évolution de la musique orientale: le cas des Mugams symphoniques chez Fikret Amirov, 226 p.
- 2012-2015: PhD Musicologist researcher member of the research team Patrimoines, Languages Musicaux at the University Paris IV Sorbonne. Research thesis: Al-Adhan, appel à la prière en Islam et témoin pur du maqam

== Main music professional activities ==
- 2011–15: Composer-in-Residence with the Orchestre Symphonique Divertimento (Ile de France).
- July / August 2010: Composer in Residence and conductor of the festival Perinaldo (Italy).
- 2010: Head and leader of the Arab Cantato Laboratory in Intercultural Centre of Torino (Italy).
- 2008: Producer and presenter of the program Lectures musicales on Radio Culture in Algiers.
- 2006-2009: Composer in Residence with the Algerian National Symphony Orchestra (the first post in Algeria: seven compositions and 30 concerts).
- 2008: Percussionist in the Algerian National Symphony Orchestra.
- 2005–08: Professor of harmony and counterpoint at the Institut Régional de la Formation Musicale Algiers.
- Since 2007: Speaking passages and radio features on traditional Algerian music and Arabic music.
- 1998–2007: Professor of Classical Guitar (Laghouat, Blida, Algiers, Tipaza).
- 2005–2006: Professor of Counterpoint to the Department of Musicology at the Ecole Normale Superieure of Teachers of Algiers (ENS Kouba).
- 2001–2006: Responsible for recording studios: technician, arranger, MAO, sound, editing and mixing.
- Since 1998: Head of Algerian traditional music orchestras and classical Arabic music: Laghouati Baroud (1998-1999) and Firqat al-Ouns (2000–06) in Laghouat, associations Al-Motribiya and Al-Wissal (2007-2008) at Blida.
