= Montreal Youth Symphony Orchestra =

Canadian orchestra

The Montreal Youth Symphony Orchestra (French: Orchestre symphonique des jeunes de Montréal) is a youth orchestra in Montreal, Quebec, Canada.

The orchestra was created in 1976, with the artistic director Louis Lavigueur, C.Q joined in 1986. The orchestra is a member of the Association des orchestres de jeunes du Québec, and Orchestras Canada. It became a major actor in Montreal's educational and cultural web over the time.
