= Asian Youth Orchestra =

The Asian Youth Orchestra (AYO) is a youth orchestra composed of musicians from several Asian countries. It was founded by Yehudi Menuhin and Richard Pontzious in 1987, and its first concert took place in August 1990, conducted by Menuhin. The orchestra's artistic director was Richard Pontzious who died in 2020, its principal conductor is Joseph Bastian, and its conductor laureate was Sergiu Comissiona who died in 2005.

== History ==
AYO's history includes the premiere of Tan Dun's Symphony 1997 with cellist Yo-Yo Ma, and concerts in venues such as Beijing's Great Hall of the People, New York's Avery Fisher Hall, California's Hollywood Bowl, Amsterdam's Concertgebouw, Berlin's Shauspielhaus, Vienna's Konzerthaus, Northern Virginia's Wolf Trap, and the Sydney Opera House. The orchestra has also performed in the White House and at the United Nations.

A formation committee of Hong Kong businessmen and women created the organizational structure for the Asian Youth Orchestra in 1987 and established it as a tax-exempt non-profit organization qualified under Section 88 of the Hong Kong Inland Revenue Ordinance.

In 2017, the orchestra made its debut at Young Euro Classic.

== Membership ==
The members of the Asian Youth Orchestra (AYO) are pre-professional musicians from China, Taiwan, Hong Kong, Indonesia, Japan, Korea, Malaysia, the Philippines, Singapore, Thailand and Vietnam. Chosen through auditions held throughout the region, the orchestra members spend six weeks together each summer: first, they participate in a three-week rehearsal camp in Hong Kong, and then they travel for another three weeks on a tour with conductors and soloists.

== Notable soloists ==
Cellists Yo-Yo Ma, Mischa Maisky, Jian Wang and Alisa Weilerstein, violinists Sarah Chang, Vadim Repin, Gidon Kremer, Gil Shaham, Elmar Oliveira, Young Uck Kim, Yu-Chien Tseng, Suwanai Akiko and Cho-Liang Lin, soprano Elly Ameling, pianists Alicia de Larrocha, Cecile Licad, Leon Fleisher, Anna Tsybuleva, the Beaux Arts Trio and trumpeter Hakan Hardenberger are among those who have performed with AYO. Conductors include Sergiu Comissiona, Alexander Schneider, Tan Dun, Okko Kamu, Eri Klas, principal conductor James Judd, and the orchestra's co-founders, Yehudi Menuhin and Richard Pontzious.

== Recordings ==
https://web.archive.org/web/20110707175553/http://www.asianyouthorchestra.com/index-hear.html

== See also ==
- List of youth orchestras
