= Somerset County Youth Orchestra =

The Somerset County Youth Orchestra is a music ensemble from Somerset, England. It was founded to offer high quality orchestral playing to younger people who live in Somerset, and is open to anyone resident or attending school in the county, of Grade V ABRSM standard, or equivalent, and above. It numbers about 60 players, the majority of whom are between 13 and 23 in age. The orchestra is run under the auspices of Somerset Music at County Hall.

Founded in 1973, the orchestra has performed with many people including Julian Lloyd Webber, Meredith Davies, Sir Charles Groves and Sir Neville Marriner. It has given concerts in prestigious locations, among them Old Town Square in Prague, La Madeleine in Paris, and the Leonardo museum in Vinci. In July 1998 it was the first orchestra to play in the European Parliament in Brussels.

There are two non-residential music courses a year in Somerset, during academic holidays at Christmas and Easter, each followed by a concert. The summer course incorporates a residential tour, usually abroad, which gives the members opportunity to play, sample other cultures and further their personal development.

The current conductor is Andy Sherwood.

== See also ==
- List of youth orchestras
