= Orchestra Giovanile Italiana =

National youth orchestra of Italy

- Youth orchestra
- Short name: OGI
- Founded: 1984
- Location: Fiesole
- Music director: Alexander Lonquich
- Website: www.scuolamusicafiesole.it/it/ogi

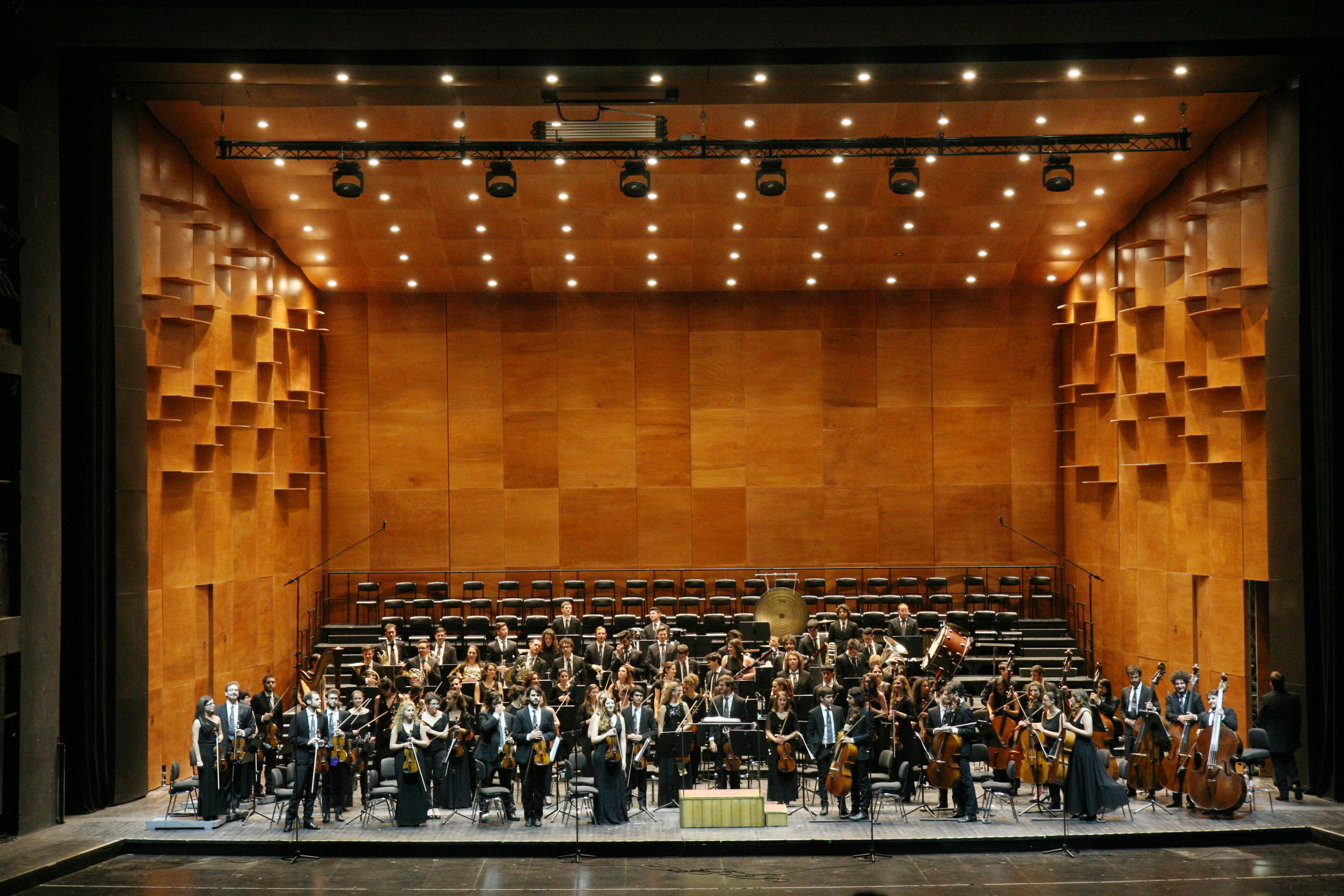
The Orchestra Giovanile Italiana performing at the Opera di Firenze, Florence in 2016

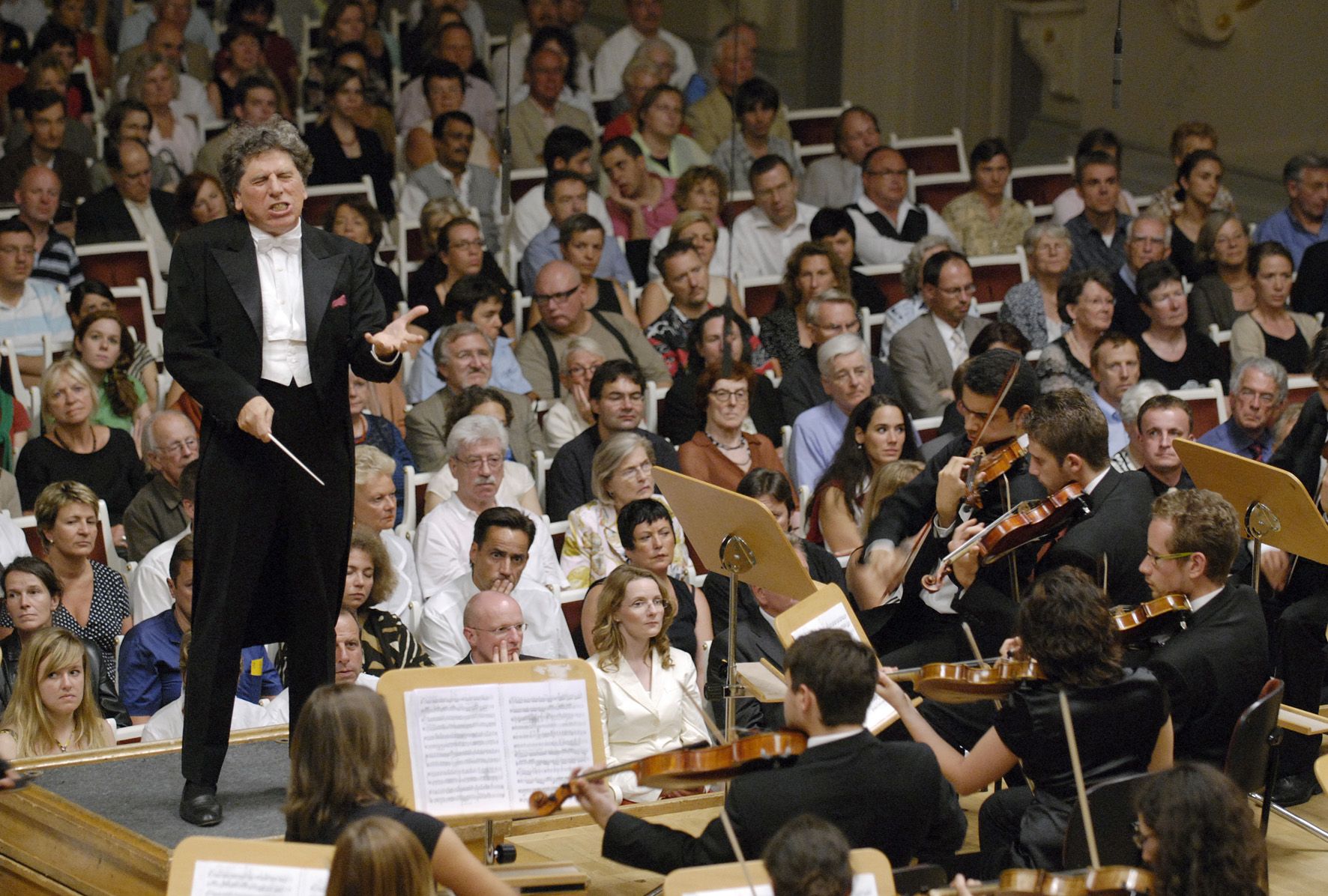
Gabriele Ferro conducting the Orchestra Giovanile Italiana at the Konzerthaus Berlin in 2007

The Orchestra Giovanile Italiana (OGI; Italian Youth Orchestra) is the national youth orchestra of Italy. It was founded in 1984 by Piero Farulli at the Fiesole School of Music.

Conductors that have worked with the OGI include Claudio Abbado, Roberto Abbado, Salvatore Accardo, Yuri Ahronovitch, Piero Bellugi, Luciano Berio, Andrey Boreyko, Daniele Gatti, Carlo Maria Giulini, Eliahu Inbal, Zubin Mehta, Riccardo Muti, Gianandrea Noseda, Krzysztof Penderecki, Giuseppe Sinopoli and Jeffrey Tate.

It is a member of the European Federation of National Youth Orchestras.

== See also ==
- List of youth orchestras
