= Cross Border Orchestra of Ireland =

Youth orchestra

The Cross Border Orchestra of Ireland (CBOI) is a youth orchestra in Ireland. Based at the Dundalk Institute of Technology in County Louth, the CBOI maintains a membership of 160 young musicians between the ages of 12 and 24 years from both sides of the border.

== History ==
The CBOI was established in 1995, shortly after the implementation of the Northern Ireland peace process, and its website describes it as "one of Ireland's flagship peace initiatives".

== Events ==
The CBOI has toured in Europe and America, including in Carnegie Hall in New York and Chicago's Symphony Hall. In April 2008, the orchestra performed at the 400th Anniversary of the Flight of the Earls in Rome. In October 2009, the orchestra travelled to New York and Washington to play at the Lincoln Center and at Fairfields Cross Cultural Youth Festival. In October 2012, the orchestra travelled to London and performed in the Royal Albert Hall.

== See also ==
- List of youth orchestras
