= Gustav Mahler Jugendorchester =

Austrian youth symphony orchestra

Gustav Mahler Jugendorchester (GMJO)
- Youth orchestra
- Founded: 1986; 40 years ago
- Location: Vienna
- Principal conductor: Claudio Abbado
- Website: gmjo.at

Gustav Mahler Jugendorchester (GMJO) is a youth orchestra based in Vienna, Austria, founded in 1986 by conductor Claudio Abbado, and named after Gustav Mahler. It is an associated member of the European Federation of National Youth Orchestras.

== History ==
In 1992, the orchestra became the first pan-European youth orchestra to offer access to young musicians in former communist countries like Hungary, Yugoslavia, Switzerland and Czechoslovakia, by holding open auditions in the former Eastern Bloc. Since 1992 a jury authorized by Claudio Abbado makes its selection from the many candidates at auditions held in more than twenty-five European cities each year. At present there are more than 100 musicians in the orchestra and they come from various countries, including Germany, Austria, France, Hungary, Russia, Spain, Great Britain, Ireland, Romania and Switzerland. The members of the jury are prominent orchestral players who continue to assist the orchestra with its musical program during the rehearsal period.

The orchestra has a huge structure. More than 130 musicians went on their Easter Tour in 2005, enough to play Richard Strauss' Eine Alpensinfonie in its full orchestration.

The GMJO tour repertoire ranges from classical to contemporary music with the emphasis on the great symphonic works of the romantic and late romantic periods. Its high artistic level and international success have prompted many leading conductors and soloists to perform with the GMJO. Gustav Mahler Jugendorchester has marked in 2005 their Easter Tour and received a warm welcome. During the tour a recording of Richard Strauss' Eine Alpensinfonie, was produced under the baton of Franz Welser-Möst. The orchestra has also performed in the Lucerne Festival, the Salzburg Festival, the Salzburg Easter Festival and at the Proms. Many former members of the GMJO are now members of leading European orchestras, some of them in principal positions.

Many conductors have cooperated with Gustav Mahler Jugendorchester, among them Claudio Abbado, Mariss Jansons, Pierre Boulez and Bernard Haitink.

== Recordings ==
- Iannis Xenakis: Keqrops, conducted by Claudio Abbado, Deutsche Grammophon 1997.
- Richard Strauss: Eine Alpensinfonie, conducted by Franz Welser-Möst, EMI 2005.
- Anton Bruckner: Symphony No. 8, conducted by Franz Welser-Möst, EMI 2002.
- Anton Bruckner: Symphony No. 9, conducted by Herbert Blomstedt, Dirigent DIR-684, 2010.
- Anton Bruckner: Symphony No. 7, conducted by Franz Welser-Möst, Orfeo 2012.
- Arnold Schoenberg: Pelleas und Melisande, Richard Wagner: Prelude to Act 1 of Tristan und Isolde, conducted by Pierre Boulez, Deutsche Grammophon 2003 (published 2012).
