= Theresia Orchestra =

International Youth Orchestra

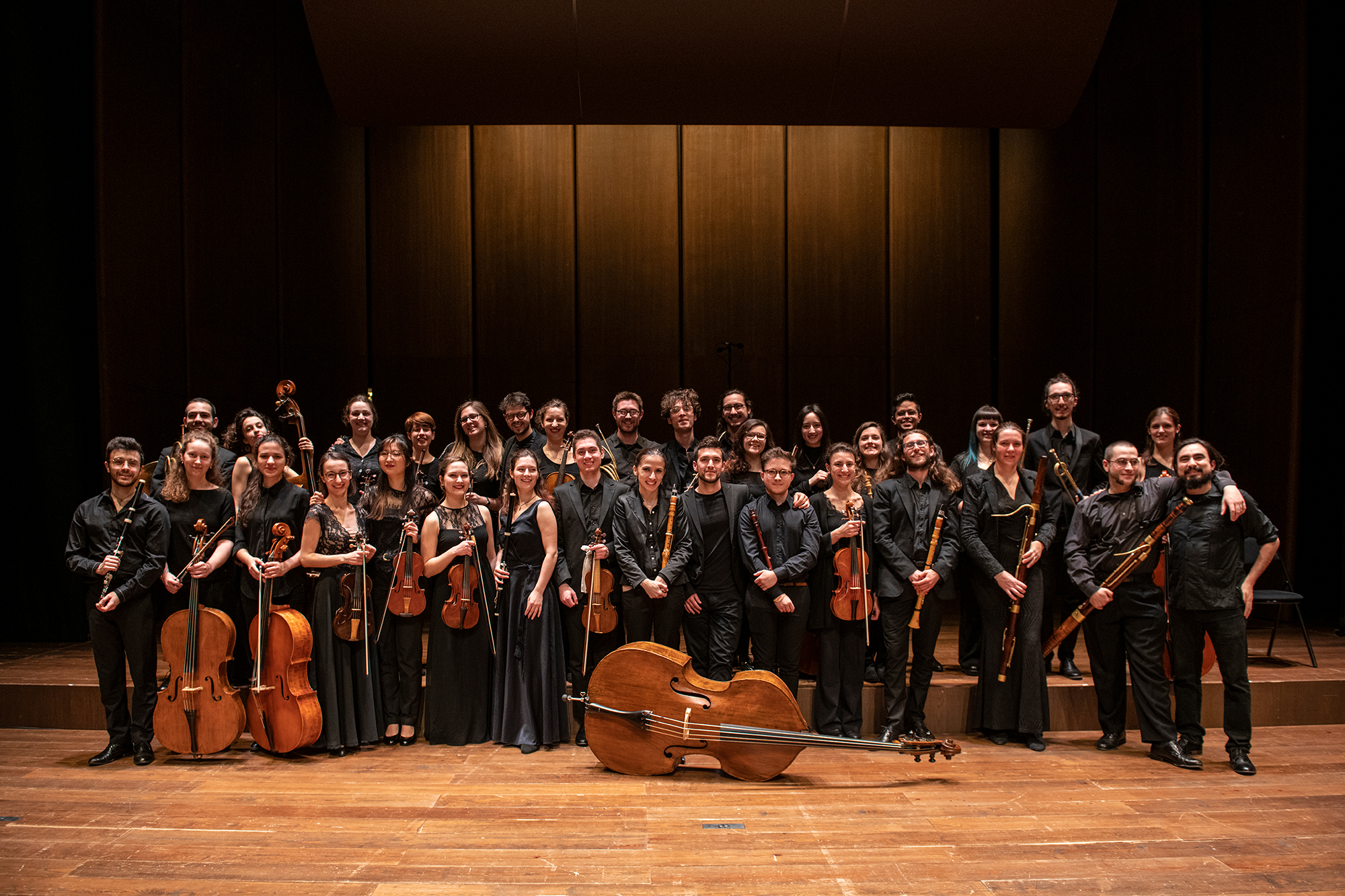
Theresia Orchestra (c)Luca Meneghel

Theresia Orchestra is an international youth orchestra dedicated to the performance of Classical repertoire on period instruments.

== Organization ==
Theresia Orchestra is managed by Fondazione ICONS,. a non profit organization based in Italy. It was founded in 2012 at the instigation of a group of patrons. Fondazione ICONS provides annual study grants to its musicians for the musical specialization through their participation in the orchestra.

The orchestra operates in a residential format, with musicians gathering for short periods (typically about one week) several times a year to prepare for concert tours across various European venues. Membership is open to musicians under the age of 28, who are usually completing their studies in historically informed performance practice and seeking initial experience in orchestral playing on period instruments. Since its foundation, the orchestra has welcomed members from over 40 different nationalities, reflecting the project's international spirit.

Theresia Orchestra has a formative mission for early-career musicians. It offers online courses to develop soft skills and collaborates with professional ensembles like Il Giardino Armonico, fostering direct professional connections. The goal is to facilitate the smooth integration of its members into professional musical careers.

The orchestra takes its name from Maria Theresia, Empress of Austria. Theresia Orchestra also runs an ambassadorship program aimed at actively promoting classical music. This program focuses particularly on reaching children and teenagers with limited access to this cultural heritage, presenting the historical context of compositions and encouraging cultural exchange and dialogue

== Recordings ==
Theresia has published several CDs for the German label Classic Produktion Osnabrück

=== List of recordings ===
- Rex Salomon by Tommaso Traetta - Christophe Rousset - CPO (2025)
- Le astuzie femminili by Domenico Cimarosa - Alessandro De Marchi - CPO (2024)
- Symphonies by Ernst Eichner - Vanni Moretto - CPO (2024)
- Ouvertures by Joseph Martin Kraus - Claudio Astronio - CPO (2023)
- Boris Goudenow by Johann Mattheson - Andrea Marchiol - CPO (2022)
- Live in Mantua - Alfredo Bernardini - Nuovo Suono (2020)
- Ouvertures & Symphonies - Chiara Banchini - Nuovo Suono (2015)
- Live in Bolzano - Claudio Astronio - Nuovo Suono (2014)

== Concerts ==
List of most relevant public performances:

2024

- Season opening at Kluturni Dom - Nova Gorica, Slovenia

2023

- Concert at Teatro del Maggio Musicale Fiorentino - Florence, Italy
- Concert at Musikfestspiele Potsdam Sanssouci - Potsdam & Rheinsberg, Germany
- Production Rex Salomon by Tommaso Traetta at Innsbrucker Festwochen der Alten Musik - Innsbruck, Austria
- Concerts at La folle journée - Warsaw, Poland and at The Krzysztof Penderecki European Centre for Music - Lusławice, Poland

2022

- Production Le Astuzie Femminili at Reate Festival - Rome and Rieti, Italy

== Memberships & Networks ==
In 2022, Theresia entered the group of the leading European youth orchestras co-funded by the European Commission alongside European Union Youth Orchestra and other talent development orchestral projects.
A member of the European Early Music Network (REMA) and the European Mozartways - Cultural Route of the Council of Europe, Theresia Orchestra is currently supported and managed by the Italian foundation ICONS and by the European Commission through the project EMPOWER funded by the Creative Europe Programme, which aims to support Theresia Orchestra in providing young musicians with training in historically informed performance, enhancing their professional skills, and promoting classical music to new audiences across Europe.
