= South Tyneside Youth Orchestra =

The South Tyneside Youth Orchestra (STYO), also known as South Tyneside Orchestra, is an orchestra based in South Tyneside in the North East of England. It consists of over 40 amateur musicians, many ex pupils of the South Tyneside Music Service.

The orchestra, and other ensembles from South Tyneside Music Service, were the first LEA Music Service to showcase talent at the then new Sage Gateshead. They have also performed at other notable venues in the North East such as Newcastle City Hall, The Sunderland Empire Theatre and The Customs House, South Shields.

In 2023 the orchestra were part of the celebrations for the 70th anniversary of the opening of the Arbeia roman fort.
