= Stresa Festival Orchestra =

The Stresa Festival Orchestra is a formation composed by young and talented musicians coming from renowned European orchestras, assembled by Gianandrea Noseda to perform every year for the Stresa Festival. The debut of the Orchestra, on 26 August 2003 with Mozart's Don Giovanni, began the project of the concert performances of different operas: Cosi fan tutte (2004), Le nozze di Figaro (2005), The magic flute (2006), La clemenza di Tito (2007), The Rake's Progress (2008), La cenerentola (2009), Idomeneo (2010).

During the years many singers were invited such as Evgenij Akimov, Simone Alberghini, Sergej Alexashkin, Tatiana Borodina, Nicola Beller Carbone, Natale De Carolis, Mariella Devia, Barbara Frittoli, Vivica Genaux, Massimo Giordano, Andrew Kennedy, Alessandra Marianelli, Peter Mattei, Sally Matthews, Francesco Meli, Maxim Mironov, Tomislav Muzek, Laura Polverelli, Nicola Ulivieri, Franco Vassallo.
