= ABC Sinfonia =

Defunct Australian training orchestra

The ABC Sinfonia was an Australian training orchestra established as the National Training Orchestra by the Australian Broadcasting Commission (ABC) in 1967. In 1980, the Orchestra was renamed ABC Sinfonia. Based in Sydney, the 40-piece orchestra was entered by scholarship, and was intended to train music postgraduates to join the state symphony orchestras. At 30 June 1984, the Sinfonia had 42 full-time scholarship holders, eight of whom were on bursaries from the Sydney Symphony Orchestra, and by 1986, 230 players had been members of the orchestra.

The Sinfonia was disbanded in 1986, after a structural and budgetary review of the ABC resulted in the divestment of its orchestra holdings.

== See also ==
- List of youth orchestras
