= Jerusalem Music Centre =

Coordinates: 31°46′16.75″N 35°13′28.23″E

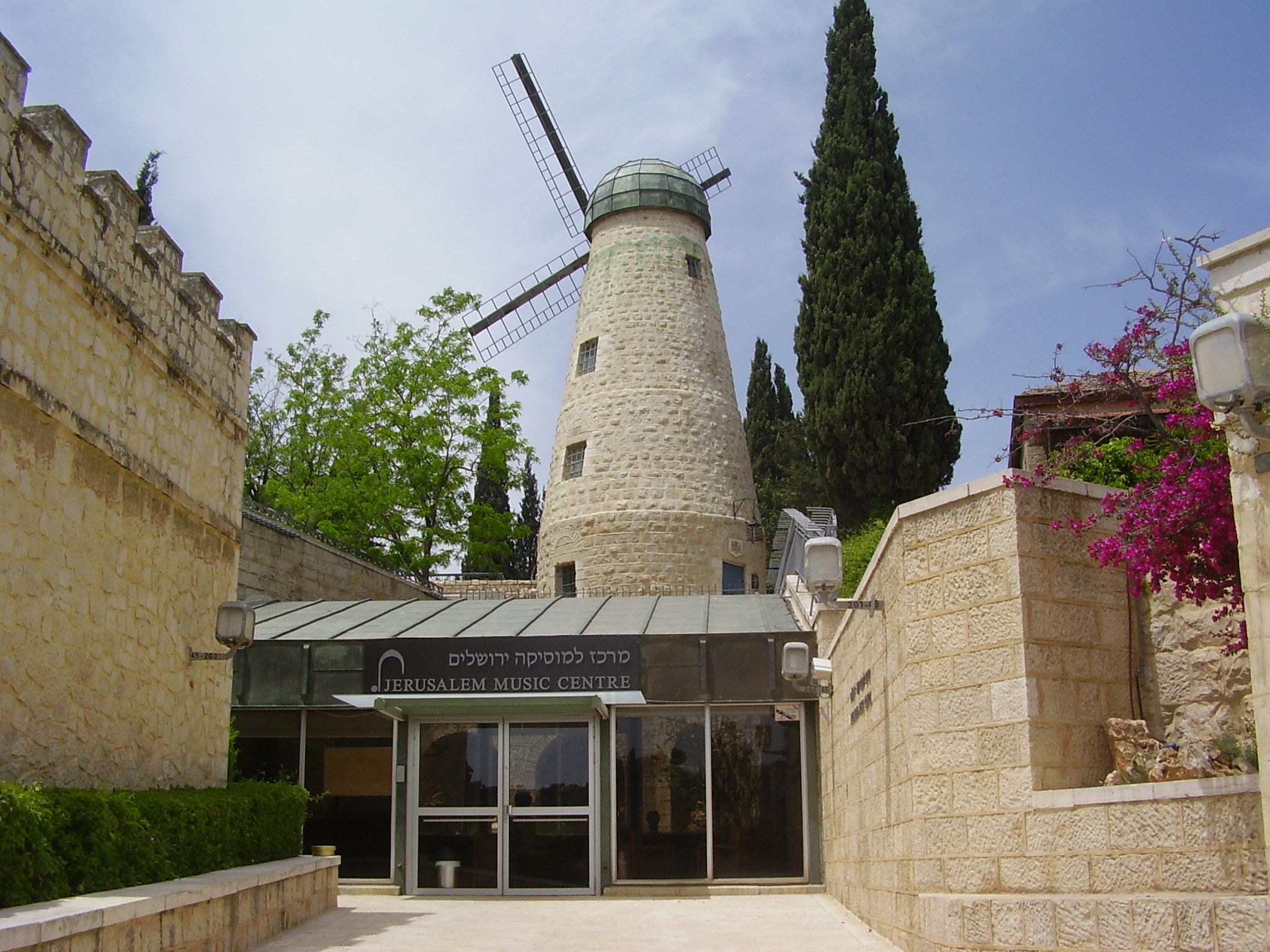
Jerusalem Music Center

The Jerusalem Music Centre is an institute for musical education in Mishkenot Sha’ananim, Jerusalem, Israel. Founded in 1973, the centre is dedicated to nurturing outstanding young musicians from across the country through long-term educational programs, performance opportunities, and professional training. In addition to its educational mission, the centre hosts concerts, master classes, workshops, and seminars for the general public and for professional musicians.

== History ==
The Jerusalem Music Centre was established in 1973 through the initiative of violinist Isaac Stern, the Mayor of Jerusalem at the time Teddy Kollek, and philosopher Isaiah Berlin. Construction of the centre was completed in 1976, as part of the cultural complex at Mishkenot Sha’ananim with the help of the Jerusalem Foundation.

In 1980, the centre launched its first major educational framework, a program for the cultivation of young violinists, combining individual coaching, chamber music training, and master classes with leading international musicians. The Excelling Musicians Program in the IDF, which allows young musicians to continue their studies during their military service, was established in 1985 together with the Jerusalem Music Centre. The Jerusalem Quartet, Israel’s first professional chamber group, was formed under the auspices of the centre and other institutions in 1997. In 2000, the Jerusalem Music Centre and the Ministry of Education established a program for teaching string instruments in elementary schools in and around Jerusalem.

In 2009, pianist Murray Perahia was appointed president of the Jerusalem Music Center.

== Programs for excelling young musicians ==
The programs for excelling young musicians are programs intended for children, focusing on children aged 14–18, and aim to enhance the musical education that the participants receive from other sources, such as private teachers or the local conservatory. These programs focus on playing chamber music.

In the beginning of every school year, participants form ensembles and meet regularly for rehearsals with coaches. Six to eight times a year, participants gather for an intensive weekend, which include special topical workshops, lectures by experts, and concerts in which the participants play in ensembles for each other and for their teachers. Twice a year, the participants take part in an intensive 3-week summer course, at end of which they form the Young Israeli Philharmonic Orchestra and perform in central halls in Jerusalem and Tel Aviv.

Special programs include teaching string instruments in elementary schools, which introduces violin and cello to second- and third-grade students attending ten schools in and around Israel, and the Classical Arabic Music Ensemble, which comprises 10 musicians, Arabs and Jews, specializing in Arab and Mediterranean music.

== Location and facilities ==
The centre houses a hall for lectures, concerts and lessons; smaller studios; and an audio and video recording studio. The Jerusalem Music Centre is part of the Mishkenot Sha’ananim complex in the neighborhood of Yemin Moshe in Jerusalem.

== Notable alumni ==
- Hagai Shaham
- Itamar Golan
- Sharon Kam
