= Bundesjugendorchester =

German national youth orchestra

- Youth orchestra
- Founded: 1969
- Location: Bonn
- Website: www.bundesjugendorchester.de

The Bundesjugendorchester (National Youth Orchestra of Germany, BJO; German: [ˌbʊndɛs ˈjuːgɛnt ɔrˌkɛstər]) is the national youth orchestra of Germany, composed of pre-university students aged 14–19. It is supported by the project company of the Deutscher Musikrat and is based in Bonn. It was established in 1969, making it one of the oldest national youth orchestras in the world.

It is a member of the European Federation of National Youth Orchestras.

== Activities ==
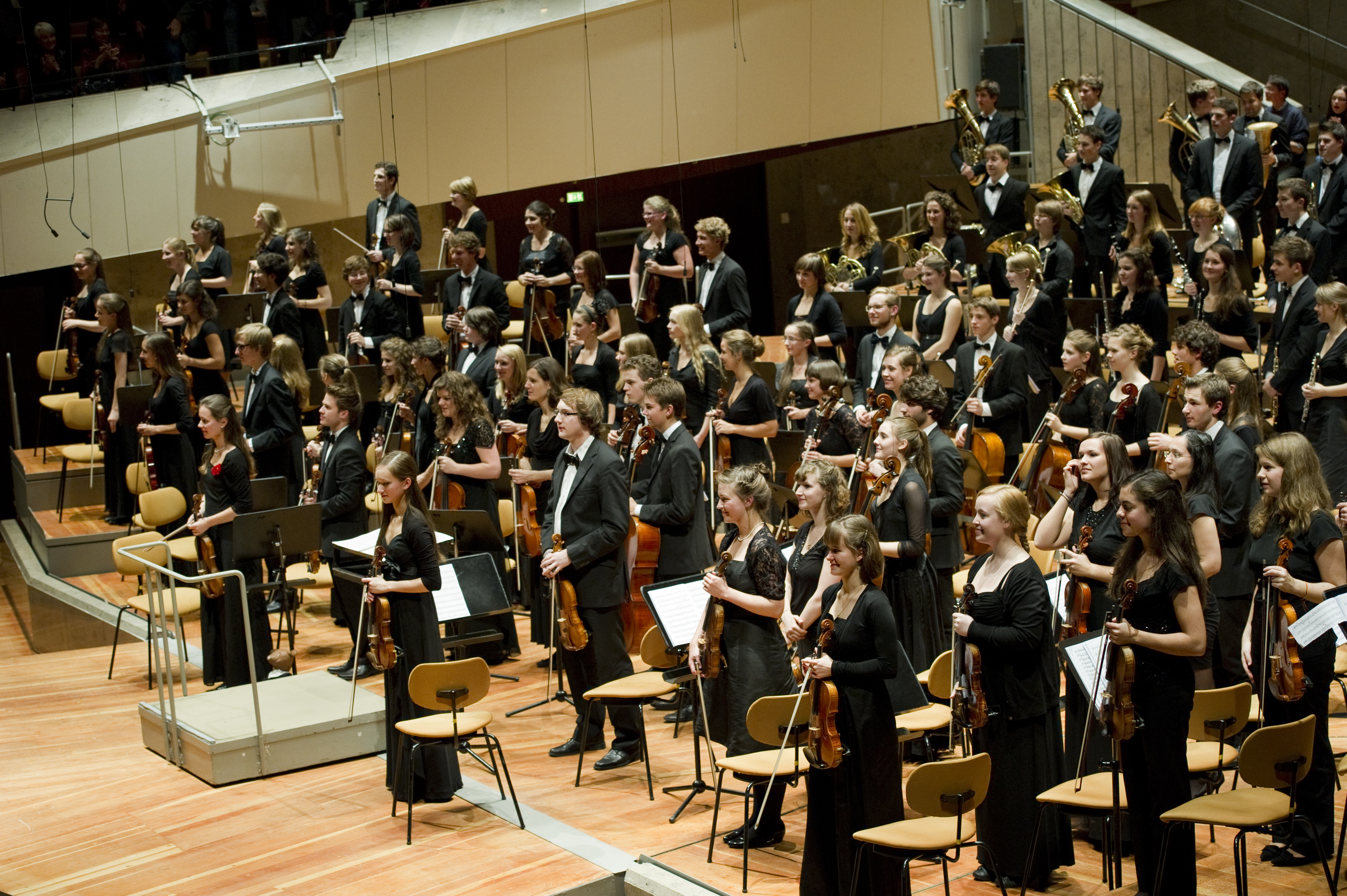
The Bundesjugendorchester at a concert in the Berliner Philharmonie in 2011

The orchestra features young German musicians under the baton of renowned conductors such as Herbert von Karajan, Kurt Masur, Gerd Albrecht, Carl St. Clair, Steven Sloane, Eiji Ōue, Kirill Petrenko and Simon Rattle. The musicians qualify for membership by auditioning in front of a jury. During the work phases, the orchestra works under the guidance of private teachers, including members of the Berlin Philharmonic, and the respective conductor. The programme includes classical and romantic orchestral music, contemporary works by composers such as Hans Werner Henze and Karl Amadeus Hartmann as well as world premieres by Peter Ruzicka and Bernd Franke, among others.

Every year, three- to four-week work phases are carried out, followed by a concert tour. Rotating conductors are in charge of the artistic direction. In addition, there are short-term special projects. Many former members now play in professional orchestras or have become well-known soloists.

In 2013, to mark the 50th anniversary of the Élysée Treaty, the Bundesjugendorchester performed a series of concerts together with its French counterpart, the Orchestre Français des Jeunes, under the direction of Dennis Russell Davies. In 2014, the orchestra renewed its collaboration with John Neumeier and gave joint guest performances with the Bundesjugendballett in Baden-Baden, Essen, Cologne, Hamburg and Berlin. In the summer of the same year, a guest tour with Markus Stenz took them to Tunisia before they played at German President Joachim Gauck's civic celebration in Bellevue Palace in September. In 2015, the orchestra, under the direction of Karl-Heinz Steffens, performed together with soloist Christian Tetzlaff (violin) in Baden-Baden and Berlin, and as "cultural ambassadors" in Latvia, Lithuania and Estonia; the soloist in the Baltic States was violinist Tobias Feldmann. In the summer of 2015, the orchestra toured China, conducted by Patrick Lange with pianist Herbert Schuch. In January 2018, the orchestra made a trip to India under the direction of Hermann Bäumer.

== See also ==
- List of youth orchestras
