= Youth orchestra =

Orchestra made of young musicians

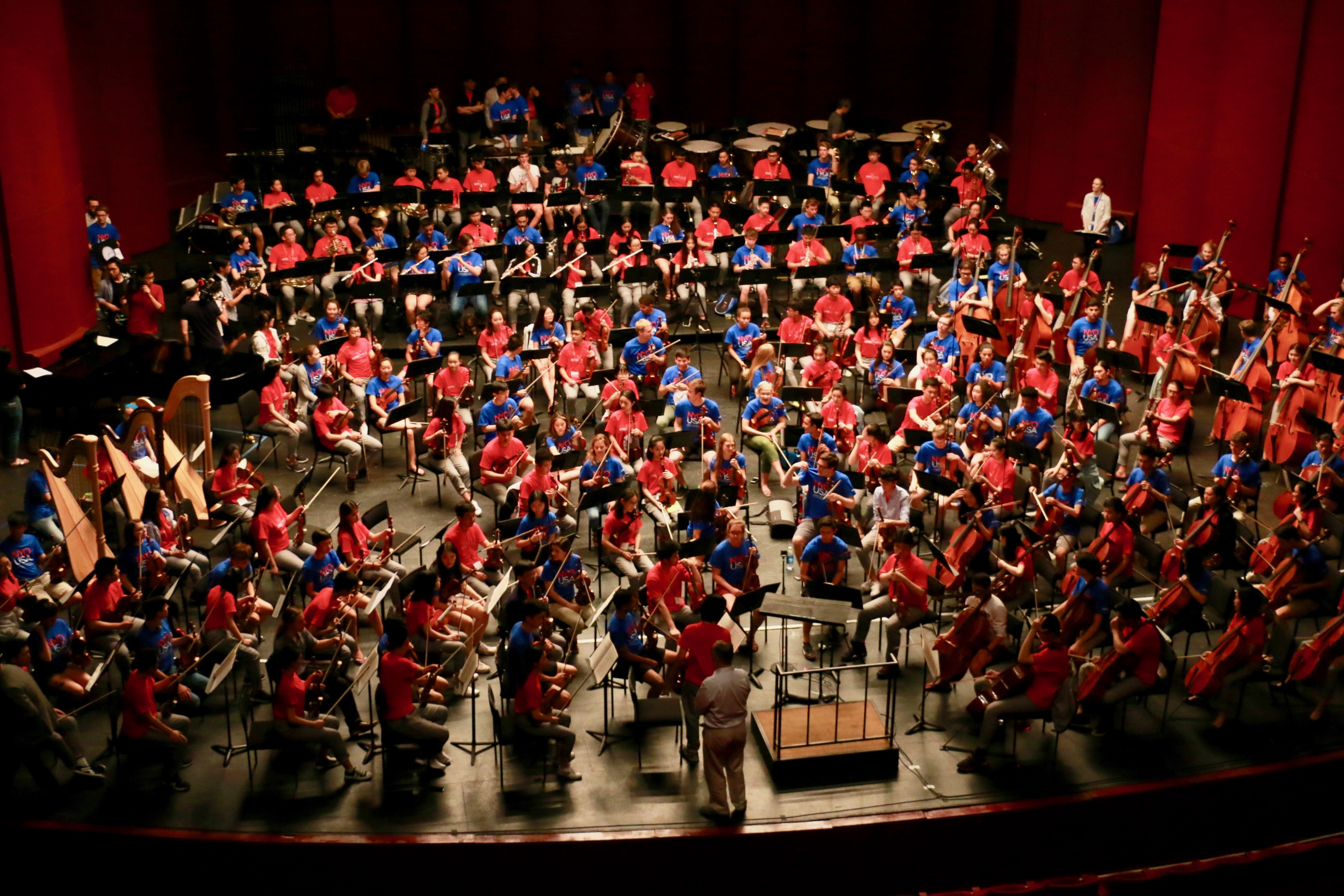
The National Youth Orchestra of China (in red) rehearsing alongside the National Youth Orchestra of the United States of America (in blue)

A youth orchestra is an orchestra made of young musicians, typically ranging from pre-teens or teenagers to those of conservatory age. Depending on the age range and selectiveness, they may serve different purposes. Orchestras for young students have the primary purpose of music education, often led by a conductor who is also a music teacher. Some youth orchestras have been set up by professional symphony orchestras, both as a training ground for future players, and as part of their community outreach program. This is particularly common in the United States, examples including the San Francisco Symphony Youth Orchestra and the New York Youth Symphony.

While a professional orchestra will receive the parts and have a few days of rehearsal, and then play several performances, youth orchestras will typically rehearse the concert program over several months. This additional time gives the conductor to coach the orchestra and teach them how to learn the many skills required of an orchestral player, including instrumental techniques and ensemble playing.

A significant festival for youth orchestras is Young Euro Classic, taking place every summer at the Konzerthaus Berlin in Germany.

== National youth orchestras ==
In contrast to local youth orchestras, which include players from a city or region and thus can meet regularly, national youth orchestras are composed of musicians from all over a country. Therefore, national youth orchestras are usually organized in short-term residencies, followed by a national or international tour. For example, the National Youth Orchestra of the United States organizes a two-week residency in New York each year, before embarking on an international tour.

Depending on the cultural tradition of classical music in a country, national youth orchestras can carry significant prestige, often being led by renowned career conductors. Therefore, they are usually quite selective, requiring applications to audition and recruiting only a fraction of them. For example, the European Union Youth Orchestra (EUYO) selects only around 120 members from 2,000 to 3,000 auditionees each year.

National youth orchestras often serve as a stepping stone in the career of young musicians. As the required artistic prowess in national youth orchestras is quite high, many former members go on to become professional musicians.

== Notable orchestras ==
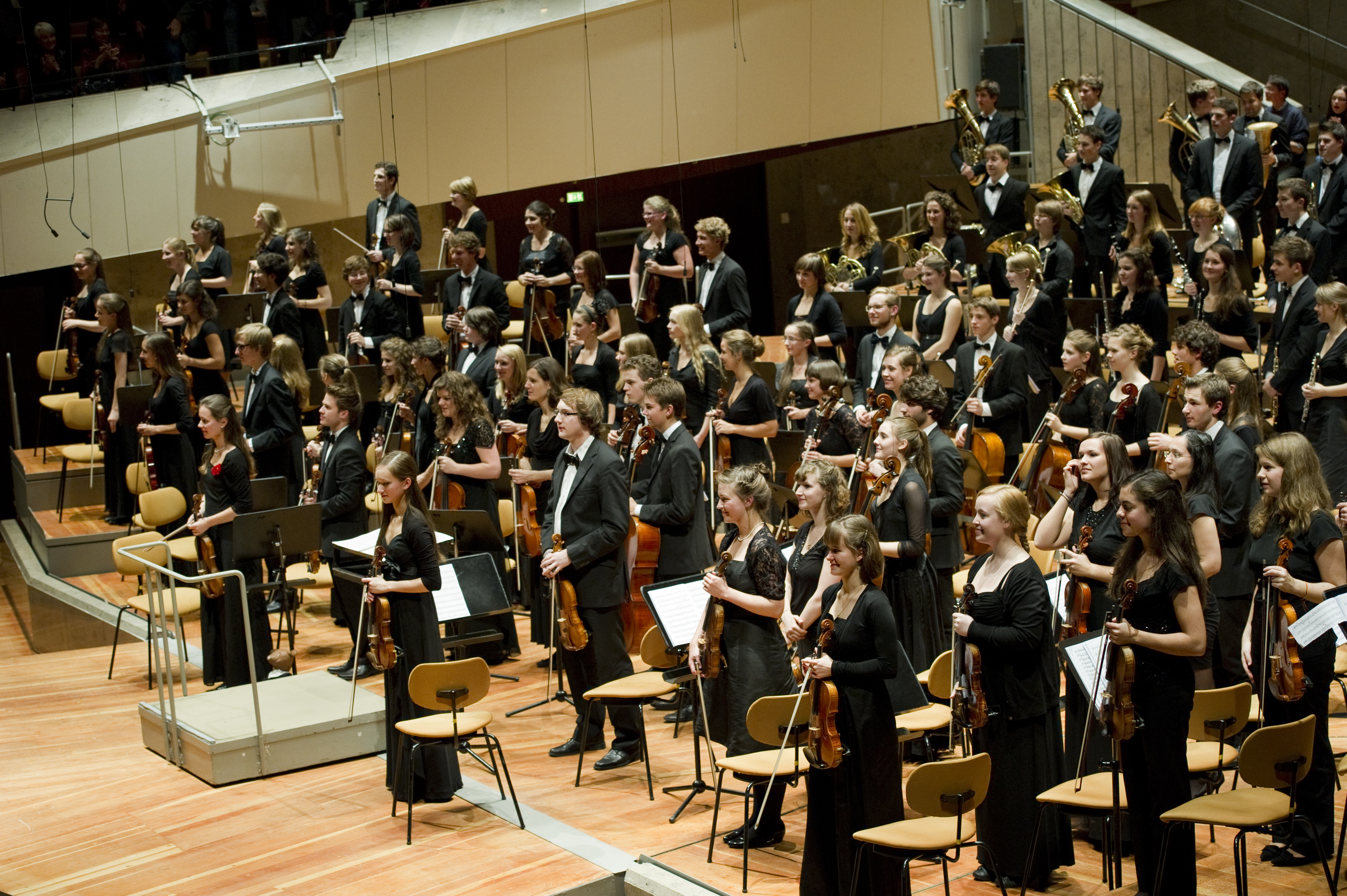
The Bundesjugendorchester at a concert in the Berliner Philharmonie in 2011

Notable youth orchestras include:

- European Union Youth Orchestra
- National Youth Orchestra of the United States of America
- National Youth Orchestra of Great Britain
- National Youth Orchestra of China
- National Youth Orchestra of Canada
- Bundesjugendorchester
- Gustav Mahler Youth Orchestra

== See also ==
- El Sistema
