= Opéra Orchestre national Montpellier =

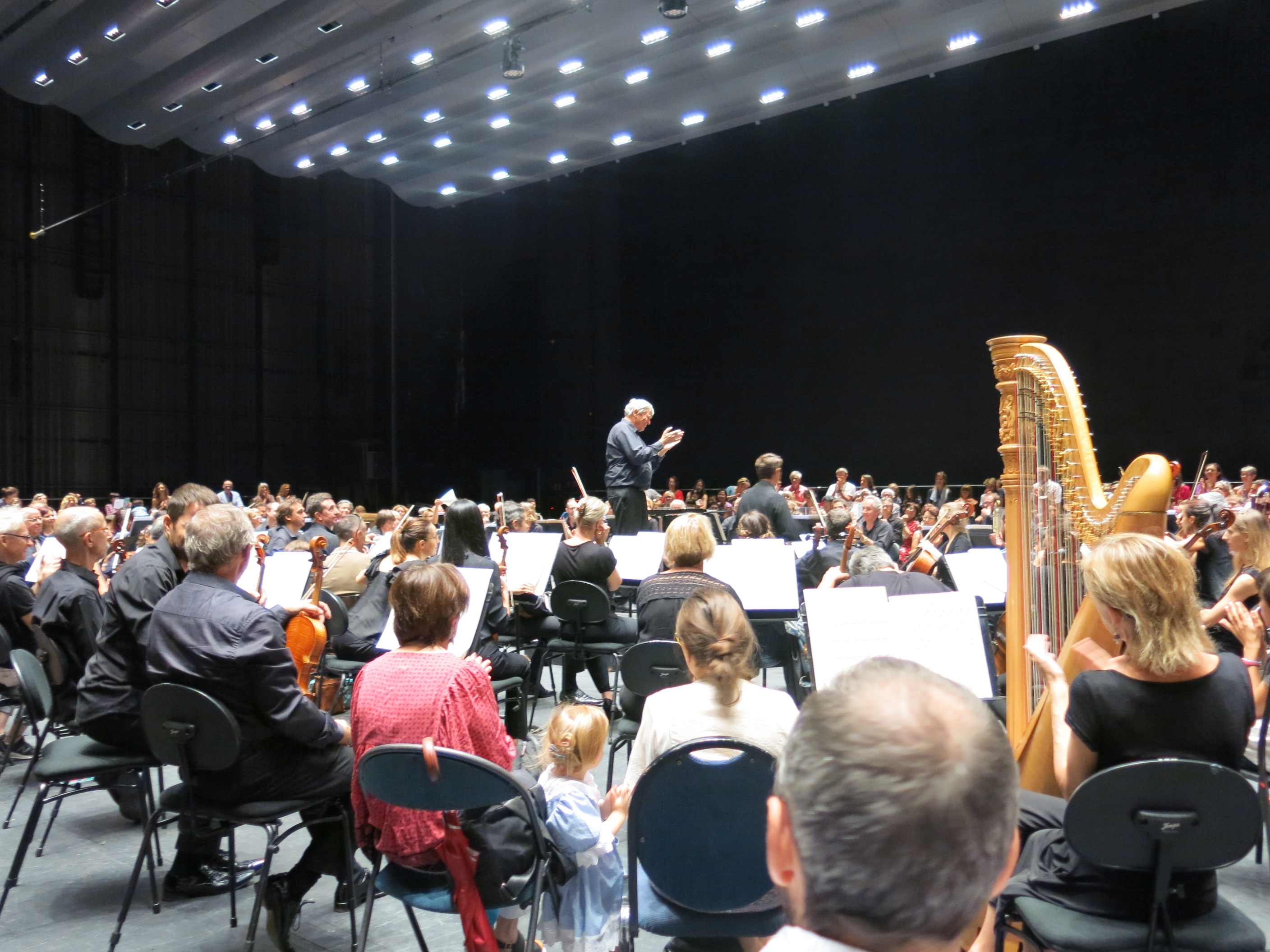
Special concert of Opéra Orchestre national Montpellier, with the audience amidst the orchestra (2018)

The Opéra Orchestre national Montpellier (Occitan: Orquestra Nacional d'Òpera de Montpelhièr) is a French orchestra, associated with the Opéra national de Montpellier in Languedoc-Roussillon. The orchestra and opera are also associated with the Festival de Radio France et Montpellier (created in 1985 by René Koering).

== History ==
The orchestra was established in 1979, with 40 musicians, as the Orchestre Philharmonique de Montpellier, with Louis Bertholon as its first music director and principal conductor. The orchestra was granted national status (Orchestre national) in 1999. In the 2000-2001 season, the Opéra de Montpellier and the Orchestre Philharmonique de Montpellier were merged into a single association, the Opéra Orchestre national Montpellier Occitanie. The orchestra's current general director is Valérie Chevalier, since December 2013.

The orchestra's most recent principal conductor was Michael Schønwandt, from 2015. to 2023. In April 2024, the orchestra announced the appointment of Roderick Cox as its new music director, effective September 2024.

== Music directors ==
- Louis Bertholon (1979–1985)
- Cyril Diederich (1985–1990)
- Gianfranco Masini (1992–1993)
- Friedemann Layer (1994–2007)
- Lawrence Foster (2009–2012)
- Michael Schønwandt (principal conductor, 2015–2023)
- Roderick Cox (2024–present)
