= Fabián Panisello =

Argentine composer, conductor, and educator

Fabián Panisello (born Fabián Andrés Panisello Cuevas; Spanish pronunciation: [faˈβjan paniˈseʝo] in Spain, [paniˈselo] in Argentina; 11 October 1963) is an Argentinian-Spanish composer, conductor, and educator. He is the founding director of the Madrid-based PluralEnsemble and Head of Composition at the Reina Sofía School of Music in Madrid. His works are published by Edition Peters.

== Education ==
Panisello was born in Buenos Aires, Argentina. He studied composition in Buenos Aires with Francisco Kröpfl and later at the Mozarteum University Salzburg with Bogusław Schaeffer (earning a Magister Artium degree in 1993 with Diploma of Excellence and Special Prize of the Austrian Ministry of Culture). He further refined his compositional studies through contact with leading composers including Elliott Carter, Franco Donatoni, Brian Ferneyhough, and Luis de Pablo. In parallel, he pursued conducting studies with Peter Eötvös and Jorma Panula.

== Career ==
=== Composer ===
Panisello has received commissions from orchestras, ensembles, and festivals worldwide. His works have been performed by ensembles and orchestras including the SWR Symphonieorchester, Deutsches Symphonie-Orchester Berlin, BBC Symphony Orchestra, Spanish National Orchestra, RTVE Symphony Orchestra, Mozarteum Orchestra Salzburg, Lyon Opera Orchestra, Ensemble Modern, Arditti Quartet, Nouvel Ensemble Moderne, United Berlin, Israel Contemporary Players, and Meitar Ensemble.

Praised by Karlheinz Stockhausen as "full of ideas, intense and bursting with energy", Panisello's music has been interpreted by distinguished soloists such as Marco Blaauw, Allison Bell, Ananda Sukarlan, Francesco D'Orazio, Hilary Summers, and Dimitri Vassilakis, and renowned conductors including Susanna Mälkki, Pierre Boulez, Erik Nielsen, and Zsolt Nagy.

Panisello has devoted particular attention to opera. His chamber opera Le Malentendu (2016), based on the play by Albert Camus with a libretto by Juan Lucas, was co-produced by Teatro Colón (Buenos Aires), Warsaw Autumn Festival, Neue Oper Wien, Teatros del Canal, and Teatro Real (Madrid), supported by the BBVA Foundation's Leonardo Grant. Les Rois mages (2019), a multimedia musical theatre with a libretto by Gilles Rico after Michel Tournier, was commissioned by the Ernst von Siemens Foundation and has been staged in Madrid, Nice, Tel Aviv, Munich, Vienna, and Berlin. His opera Die Judith von Shimoda (2023), based on Brecht and Wuolijoki's adaptation of Yūzō Yamamoto's Nyonin Aishi. Akichi Monogatari, with a libretto by Juan Lucas, was commissioned by the Bregenz Festival in co-production with Neue Oper Wien and was nominated for Best World Premiere of 2024 by the Österreichischer Musiktheaterpreis.

During his tenure as composer-in-residence at the Grafenegg Festival 2025, his commissioned orchestral work Mariposas was premiered by the Tonkünstler Orchestra.

=== Conductor ===
Panisello is the founder and director of PluralEnsemble, which focuses on contemporary music performance, commissioning new works, and supporting emerging composers and performers. He has conducted various international orchestras and ensembles, including the Tonkünstler Orchestra, Orquesta Sinfónica de Galicia, Basque National Orchestra, Savaria Symphony Orchestra, Concerto Budapest Orchestra, Neue Vokalsolisten, Tenerife Symphony Orchestra, Exaudi Vocal Ensemble, Riot Ensemble, United Berlin, Turning Point, Israel Contemporary Players, and Cantus Ensemble.

His conducting engagements have included major festivals such as Wien Modern, Munich Biennale, Présences, Ars Musica, Ultraschall, Aspekte, Klangspuren Schwaz, Sound Ways (Saint Petersburg), New Music Week (Shanghai), Festival Manca (Nice), Resis, Bridges (Vienna Konzerthaus), and the China-ASEAN Music Festival. Panisello's performances have been recorded on labels including Neos, Col Legno, Cypres, Verso, IBS Classical, and Columna Música.

== Pedagogical work ==
From 1996 to 2000, Panisello was Professor of Musical Analysis and later Academic Director at the Reina Sofía School of Music, a position he also held at the International Institute of Chamber Music of Madrid until 2013. From 2014 to 2019, he was Dean and Director of both institutions.

He is guest professor at the China Conservatory of Music and regularly gives lectures, masterclasses, and seminars on composition, conducting, and musical analysis in institutions such as the Royal Academy of Music, Tokyo University of the Arts (Geidai), Manhattan School of Music, University of Shanghai, Domaine Forget, Jerusalem Academy of Music and Dance, Peter Eötvös Contemporary Music Foundation, University of Bogotá, Centro Nacional de las Artes of Mexico, University of California, Davis, Academy of Music, University of Zagreb, Yerevan Komitas State Conservatory, University of Music and Theatre Munich, University of Music and Performing Arts Graz, University of Zaragoza, Tel Aviv University, and the Pontifical Catholic University of Chile.

Panisello is a member of the National Academy of Fine Arts of Argentina, serves on the Academic Committee of Fundación Albéniz, and is part of the Consulting Council of the Teatro Real in Madrid.

== Prizes ==
- Premio de Fondo Nacional de las Artes (1988, Buenos Aires)
- Mozarts Erben Prize (1991, Salzburg)
- Würdigungspreis of the Ministry of Education, Science and Culture of Austria (1993, Vienna)
- Editar Competition (1995, Buenos Aires)
- Premio Iberoamericano Rodolfo Halffter de Composición, First Prize (2004, Mexico)

== Works (selection) ==
=== Works for orchestra ===
- Aksaks (October 2008, Donaueschingen)
- Mandala (October 2009, Madrid)
- Cuadernos (July 2004, Madrid)
- Mariposas (August 2025, Grafenegg)

=== Works for orchestra with soloist ===
- Movements for piano and orchestra (May 2010, Madrid)
- Trumpet Concerto (Concierto para trompeta y orquesta) (January 2010, Berlín)
- Violin Concerto (Concierto per Violino) (February 2004, Madrid)
- Horn Concerto (Concierto para trompa) (January 2024, Madrid)

=== Opera ===
- Le Malentendu, chamber opera after the work of the same name by Albert Camus with libretto by Juan Lucas (premiere March 2016, Teatro Colón, Buenos Aires)
- Les Rois mages, multimedia musical theatre based on the book by Michael Tournier and a libretto by Gilles Rico (premiere January 2019, National Auditorium of Music, Madrid)
- Die Judith von Shimoda, opera in two parts based on the play by Bertolt Brecht, adapted from Nyonin Aishi. Akichi Monogatari by Yamamoto Yūzō with libretto by Juan Lucas (premiere August 2023, Bregenzer Festspiele)

=== Works for ensembles of more than five instruments ===
- Solstice (2013, Madrid and Frankfurt)
- Chamber Concerto (Concierto de cámara) (May 2005, Lyon)
- Moods II (2001, Alicante)
- Written in Blue for trumpet and ensemble (May 2024, Madrid)

=== Works for voice ===
- L'Officina della Resurrezione for baritone, electronics and string quartet (2013, Tel Aviv)
- L'Officina della Resurrezione II for baritone, spoken chorus, electronics and string orchestra (2014, Katowice)
- Gothic Songs (2012, Alte Oper Frankfurt)
- Libro del frío for soprano, flute, clarinet, violin, viola, violoncello, and piano (September 2011, Schwaz, Austria)
- The Raven (May 2022, Madrid)
- Meister Eckhart: Mystical Song (April 2019, Cuenca)

=== Works for homogeneous formations ===
- Three Movements for String Quartet (2006, Takefu, Japan)
- Cinco piezas métricas (2000)
- Trio II (1996)
- Klavieretüden Band I (2008)
- Klavieretüden Band II (2015)
