= Kristiina Poska =

Estonian conductor (born 1978)

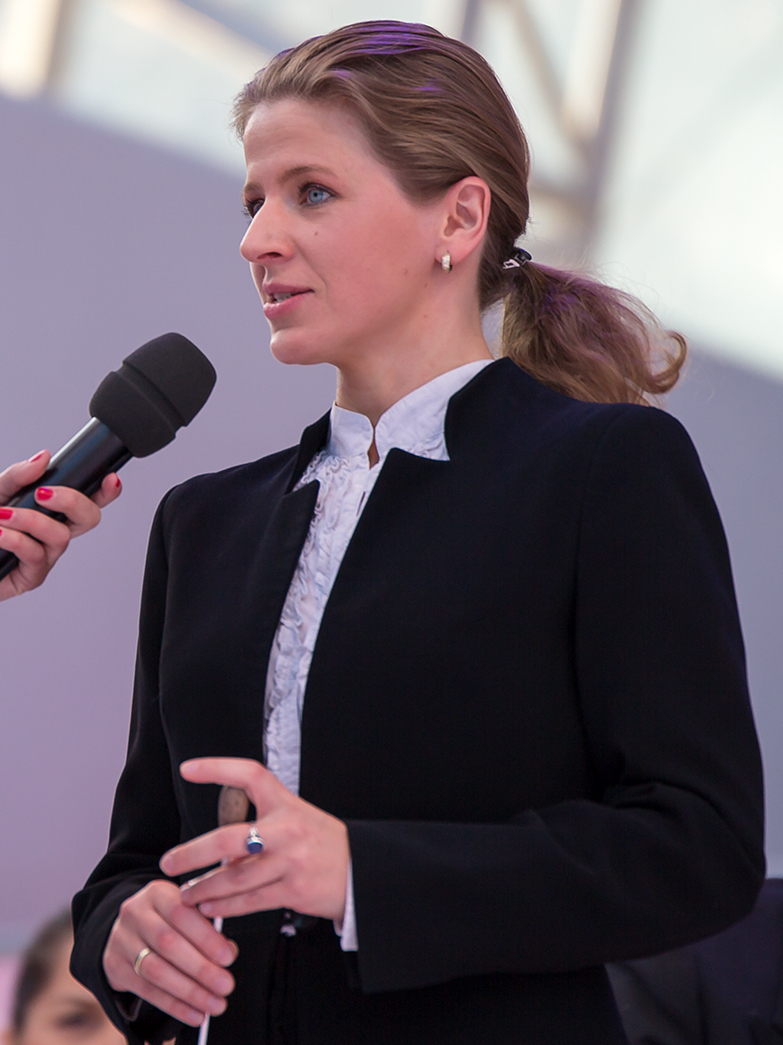
- Poska at the Eurovision Young Musicians final rehearsal, 2014

Background information
- Born: 12 July 1978 (age 48); Türi, then part of Estonian SSR, Soviet Union
- Occupation: Conductor

Kristiina Poska (born 12 July 1978) is an Estonian conductor.

== Biography ==
Poska was born in Türi. At age eight, she began piano lessons. She graduated from Türi Music School in piano studies in 1994, and then studied choral conducting at the Georg Ots Tallinn Music College from 1994 to 1998. She continued her choral conducting studies in 2002 at Eesti Muusikaakadeemia (the Estonian Academy of Music and Theatre). She subsequently moved to Berlin, where she studied at the Universität der Künste (Berlin University of the Arts) with Kai-Uwe Jirka and Jörg-Peter Weigle. From 2004 to 2009, she studied orchestral conducting at the Hochschule für Musik "Hanns Eisler" with Christian Ehwald. In the spring of 2008, she received a scholarship from the Conductors Forum at the German Music Council, where her conducting mentors included Peter Gülke, Reinhard Goebel, and Eri Klas.

In 1998, Poska founded the Estonian choir Nimeta ('No Name'). From 2006 to 2011, she conducted the Cappella Academica symphony orchestra of the Humboldt University of Berlin. Following engagements at the Komische Oper Berlin in the 2010–2011 season (La Traviata, La Périchole), she served as Erste Kapellmeisterin with the company from 2012 to 2016.

In October 2018, Theater Basel announced the appointment of Kristiina Poska as its next general music director (GMD; Generalmusikdirektorin), the first female conductor to hold the post. She served as GMD of the Theater Basel for the 2019–2020 season. In March 2019, the Symfonieorkest Vlaanderen (Flanders Symphony Orchestra) announced the appointment of Poska as its next chief conductor, the first female conductor to be named to the post, effective with the 2019–2020 season. She concluded her tenure with the Symfonieorkest Vlaanderen in October 2025.

In May 2021, the Latvian National Symphony Orchestra announced the appointment of Poska as its next principal guest conductor, the first female conductor to be named to the post, effective in the autumn of 2021, with an initial contract of two seasons. In September 2023, the Orchestre Français des Jeunes (OFJ) announced the appointment of Poska as its next music director, the first female conductor ever named to the post. Originally scheduled to assume the OFJ post in the summer of 2025, Poska took up the post as of the start of 2025.

== Awards ==
- Orchestra's Preference Award at the Dimitri Mitropoulos International Competition for Conducting in Athens, October 2006
- First prize, 5th Bergische Symphoniker Female Conductors' Competition, May 2007
- Top 3, Donatella Flick Conducting Competition in London (2010)
- German Operetta Prize for Young Conductors (jointly awarded by Leipzig Opera and the Conductor's Forum of the Deutscher Musikrat)
- Audience prize, Leipziger Volkszeitung
- Third prize and audience prize, Nikolai Malko Conducting Competition, Copenhagen, May 2012
- German Conducting Prize (€35,000 prize money) offered by the German Music Council in cooperation with the Konzerthaus Berlin, April 2013

Cultural offices
Preceded by Jan Latham-Koenig	Chief Conductor, Symfonieorkest Vlaanderen; 2019–2025	Succeeded by Martijn Dendievel
Preceded by Erik Nielsen	Generalmusikdirektorin, Theater Basel; 2019–2020	Succeeded by (post vacant)
Preceded by Michael Schønwandt	Music Director, Orchestre Français des Jeunes; 2021–present	Succeeded by incumbent
