= Tonkünstler Orchestra =

Austrian orchestra

- Orchestra
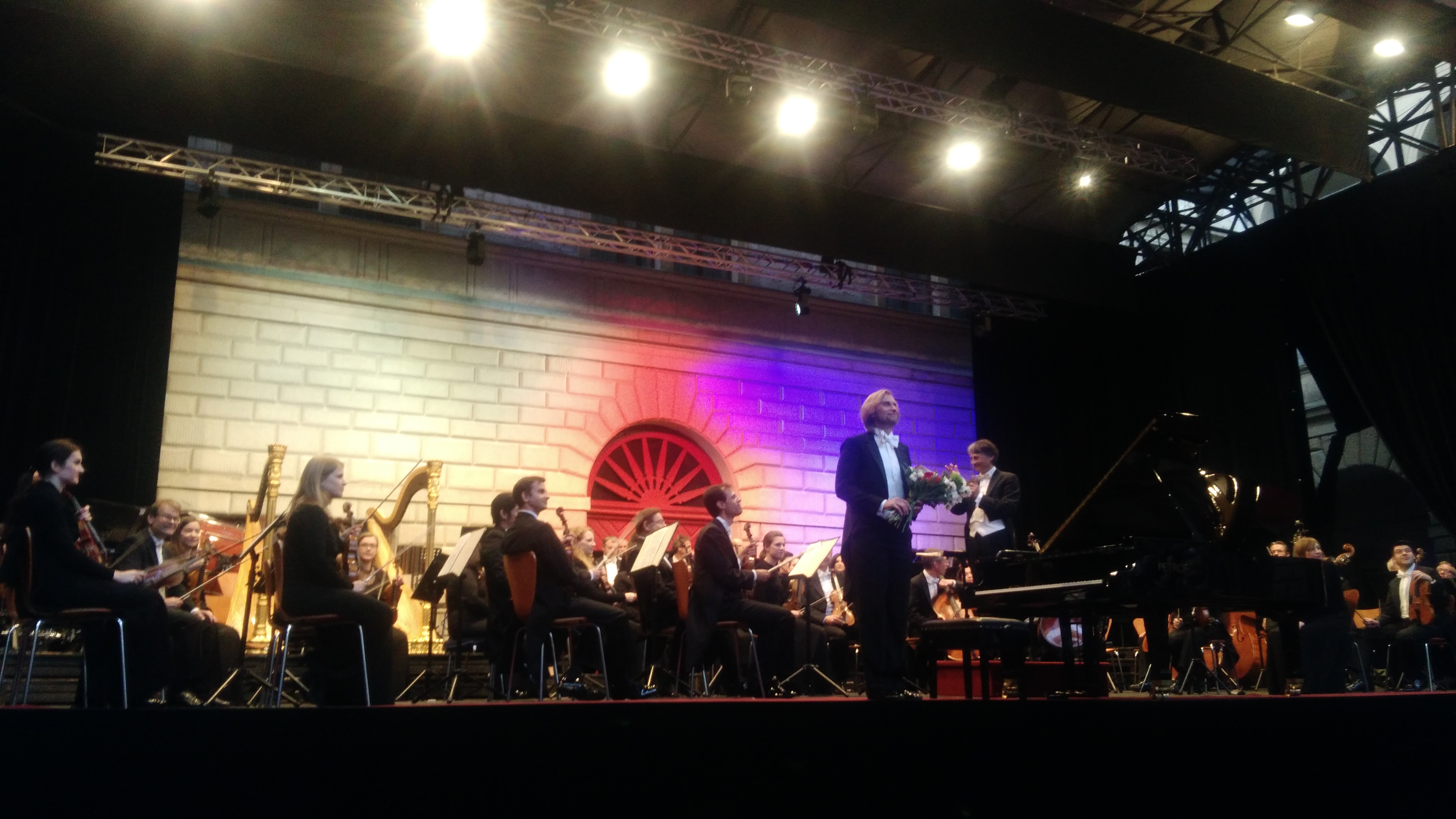
- Tonkünstler Orchestra at Smetanova Litomyšl 2018 festival, with pianist Ivo Kahánek (front)
- Native name: Tonkünstler-Orchester Niederösterreich
- Former name: N.S. Wiener Tonkünstlerorchester; Gausymphonieorchester Niederdonau; Landessymphonieorchester Niederösterreich; Niederösterreichisches Tonkünstlerorchester
- Founded: 1907
- Location: Vienna; Sankt Pölten
- Concert hall: Musikverein; Festspielhaus St. Pölten
- Principal conductor: Fabien Gabel
- Website: www.tonkuenstler.at/en

The Tonkunstler Orchestra (German: Tonkünstler-Orchester Niederösterreich, German pronunciation: [ˈtoːnˌkʏnstlɐ ˌɔʁˈkɛstɐ ˈniːdɐˌʔøːstəʀaɪ̯ç]) is an Austrian orchestra based in Vienna and Sankt Pölten, Lower Austria. The orchestra has its residencies in Vienna and Lower Austria. In Vienna, they perform concerts in the Golden Hall of the Musikverein. As the state orchestra of Lower Austria, Tonkünstler have a second residency in Festspielhaus St. Pölten. From the summer of 2007, the orchestra became the orchestra-in-residence at the international Grafenegg Music Festival.

== History ==
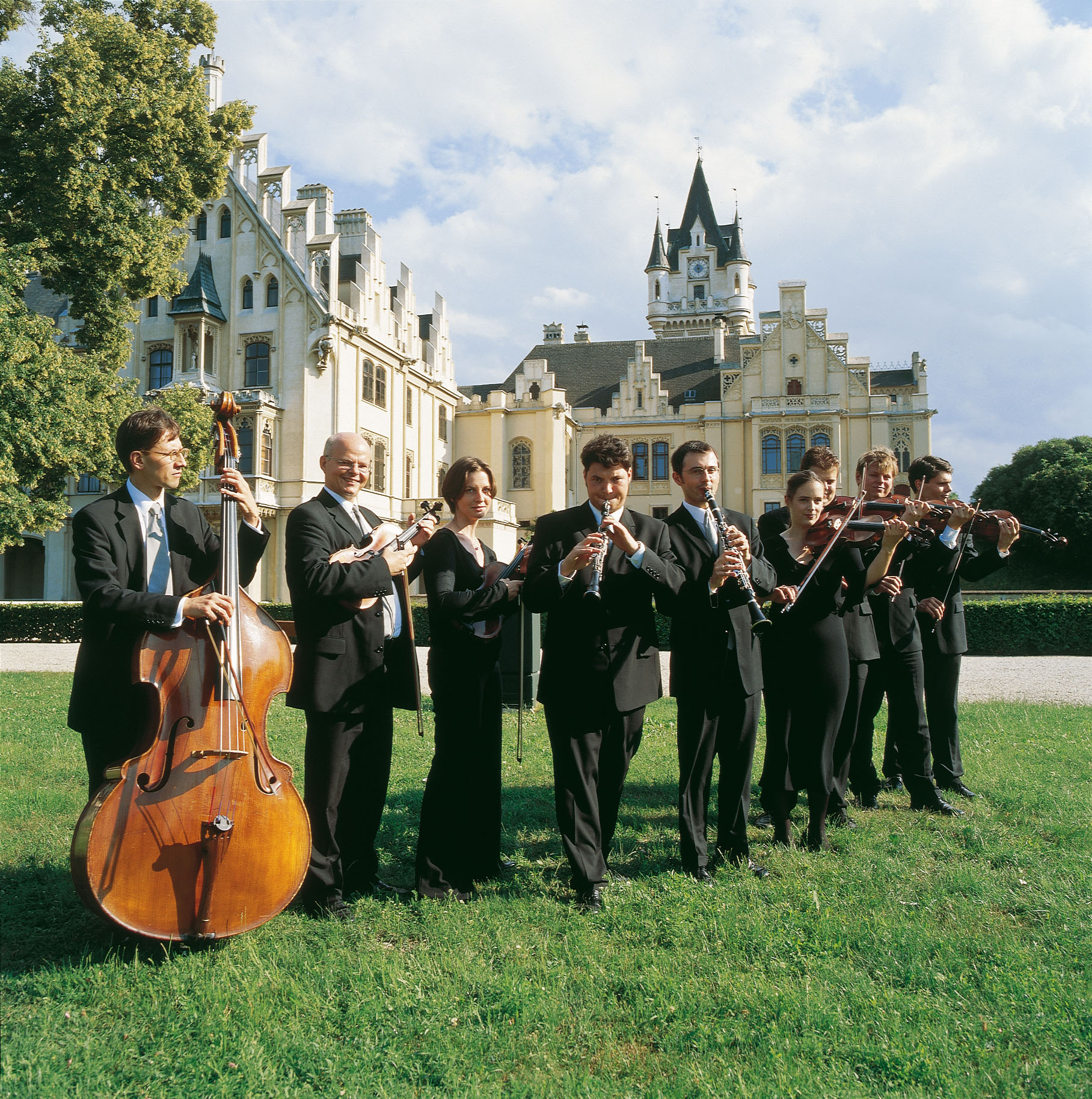
Tonkünstler musicians in Grafenegg

The orchestra's name has its origins in the Tonkünstler-Sozietät, Wien, which was organizing concerts in the era of Haydn and Mozart. This name lived on in the Viennese "Tonkünstler Orchestra Association", which was founded at the beginning of the 20th century. The first concert was performed in 1907 at the Musikverein presenting works of Karl Goldmark, Edvard Grieg, Franz Liszt and Ludwig van Beethoven. In 1913, the Viennese Tonkünstler Orchestra were the first to perform Arnold Schönberg's Gurre-Lieder. The Sunday afternoon performances of the orchestra were very popular with the Viennese audience. During World War I, the orchestra had to merge with the so-called "Vienna Concertverein" due to financial hardships. The association continued to organise concerts until 1933.

In the mid-1930s, the National Socialist conductor Leopold Reichwein founded a new orchestra, which took the name N.S. Wiener Tonkünstlerorchester after Austria was annexed by Germany in 1938. The orchestra then became the Gausymphonieorchester Niederdonau in 1939. It was doing concerts throughout World War II, mostly with the Kraft durch Freude movement and in supporting the Wehrmacht. The orchestra renamed itself in 1945 to Landessymphonieorchester Niederösterreich. In 1946 this ensemble tied to the Tonkünstler tradition and called itself Niederösterreichisches Tonkünstlerorchester (Lower Austrian Tonkünstler Orchestra). The tradition of Sunday afternoon concerts was also revived. In 2002, the orchestra underwent a re-structuring process and is now called Tonkünstler-Orchester Niederösterreich (Tonkünstler Orchestra of Lower Austria). The Tonkünstler was the first Austrian orchestra with a division focused solely on music education.

From 2004 to 2009, Kristjan Järvi was principal conductor of the orchestra, and his work with the orchestra included a commercial recording of Leonard Bernstein's Mass. In the 2009–2010 season, Andrés Orozco-Estrada, who was the orchestra's assistant conductor for two years, took up the post of principal conductor. Orozco-Estrada stood down from the post at the close of the 2014–2015 season.

In November 2013, the orchestra announced the appointment of Yutaka Sado as its next principal conductor, effective with the 2015–2016 season, with an initial contract of 3 years. To mark the opening of the 10th Grafenegg Festival in August 2016, his contract with the Tonkunstler was extended until summer 2022. Sado concluded his tenure at the close of the 2024-2025 season and now has the title of Ehrendirigent (honorary conductor) with the orchestra.

In 2019, Fabien Gabel first guest-conducted the orchestra. In June 2023, the orchestra announced the appointment of Gabel as its next principal conductor, effective with the 2025-2026 season, with an initial contract of four years.

== Principal conductors ==
- Leopold Reichwein (1933–1939)
- Bert Costa (1939–1943)
- Friedrich Jung (1944–1945)
- Kurt Wöss (1946–1951)
- Gustav Koslik (1951–1964)
- Heinz Wallberg (1964–1975)
- Walter Weller (1975–1978)
- Miltiades Caridis (1978–1988)
- Isaac Karabtchevsky (1988–1994)
- Fabio Luisi (1994–2000)
- Carlos Kalmar (2000–2003)
- Kristjan Järvi (2004–2009)
- Andrés Orozco-Estrada (2009–2014)
- Yutaka Sado (2015–2025)
- Fabien Gabel (2025–present)
