= Michael Schønwandt =

Danish conductor (born 1953)

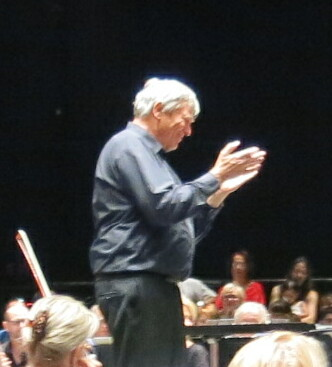
Michael Schønwandt (2018)

Michael Detlev Schønwandt (born 10 September 1953 in Frederiksberg) is a Danish conductor. In Denmark, he studied piano, theory, and composition, and later continued musical studies at the Royal Academy of Music in London.

== Biography ==
In 1979, Schønwandt secured a post as 'permanent conductor' by the Royal Opera in Copenhagen. Schønwandt was Music Director of the Royal Danish Orchestra and the Copenhagen Opera House from 2000 to 2011. His work in contemporary opera has included conducting the world premiere productions of Poul Ruders' operas The Handmaid’s Tale and Dancer in the Dark. In 2006, he conducted the Royal Opera, in a production of Richard Wagner's Der Ring des Nibelungen, released on DVD by Decca.

Schønwandt was principal guest conductor of the Théâtre National de La Monnaie from 1984 to 1987, and held the same post with the Danish National Symphony Orchestra from 1987 to 2000. Schønwandt has also served as chief conductor of the Berliner Sinfonie-Orchester from 1992 to 1998. In May 2009, Schønwandt was named principal conductor of the Netherlands Radio Chamber Philharmonic In August 2010 he formally took up the post, which he held until the orchestra's dissolution in 2013.

From 2015 to 2023, Schønwandt was principal conductor of the Opéra Orchestre National de Montpellier in France. He was music director of the Orchestre Français des Jeunes from 2021 to 2024.

Schønwandt's recordings include the operas, symphonies and concerti of Carl Nielsen. In addition, he has made several opera recordings, such as Salome and The Handmaid’s Tale.

In 2005, Schønwandt was made a Knight 1st Class (Ridder af 1. grad) of the Order of the Dannebrog, and in 2011 he was made a Commander of the Order of Dannebrog.

== Selected recordings ==
- Hector Berlioz, Requiem, James Wagner, tenor, Ernst-Senff Choir, Rundfunkchor Berlin, Berliner Sinfonie-Orchestra, dir Michael Schønwandt. CD Kontrapunkt 1993 (recorded in April 1992) OCLC 873567878

Cultural offices
Preceded by Claus Peter Flor	Principal Conductor, Konzerthausorchester Berlin; 1992–1998	Succeeded by Eliahu Inbal
Preceded by Paavo Berglund	Principal Conductor, Royal Danish Orchestra; 2000–2011	Succeeded by Michael Boder
Preceded by Jaap van Zweden	Principal Conductor, Netherlands Radio Chamber Philharmonic; 2010–2013	Succeeded by (no successor)
Preceded by Lawrence Foster	Principal Conductor, Orchestre national de Montpellier Languedoc Roussillon; 2015–2023	Succeeded by Roderick Cox
Preceded by Fabien Gabel	Music Director, Orchestre Français des Jeunes; 2021–2024	Succeeded by Kristiina Poska
