= Christian Jost (composer) =

German composer and conductor (born 1963)

- Born: 17 October 1963 (age 62); Trier, Rhineland-Palatinate
- Education: Musikhochschule Köln; San Francisco Conservatory of Music
- Occupations: composer; conductor
- Spouse: Stella Doufexis
- Awards: Ernst von Siemens Music Prize

Christian Jost (born 17 October 1963) is a German composer and conductor. He has served as composer-in-residence for several German orchestras; in 2003, he was awarded the Ernst von Siemens Composer Prize. In 2009, Jost was described by Musical Opinion as "one of the most exciting young composers at work in Germany today."

== Biography ==
Born in Trier, Jost studied at the Musikhochschule Köln from 1983 to 1988 and at the San Francisco Conservatory of Music from 1988 to 1989. Between 1996 and 1998, he frequently visited China, where he collaborated with a number of orchestras.

He has been composer in residence of the Beethoven Orchester Bonn, the Staatskapelle Weimar, the Deutsche Oper am Rhein, the Staatsphilharmonie Rheinland-Pfalz, the National Symphony Orchestra in Taiwan, the Netherlands Philharmonic Orchestra, and the Grafenegg Festival.

Jost is the composer of nine operas and numerous symphonic works, which have been performed by some of the world's leading opera houses and orchestras, including the Zürich Opera, the Berlin Philharmonic, the Grafenegg Festival, the Theater an der Wien.

His opera Hamlet, commissioned by the Komische Oper Berlin in 2008 and premiered there in 2009, was voted "World Premiere of the Year" by the German music magazine Opernwelt.

In 2020, his opera Egmont was premiered at the Theater an der Wien as part of the theatre's Beethoven Year.

== Personal life ==
Jost was married to the German mezzo-soprano Stella Doufexis, who died in 2015. His reworking of Robert Schumann's Dichterliebe, conceived for her before her death, was released by Deutsche Grammophon in 2019.
