= Fabien Gabel =

French conductor (born 1975)

- Born: 10 September 1975 (age 50); Paris
- Occupation: Conductor

Fabien Gabel (born 10 September 1975) is a French conductor.

== Biography ==
As a youth, Gabel began trumpet studies at age 6. He continued his music education at the Conservatoire National Supérieur de Musique de Paris, where he won a first prize in 1996, and at the Hochschule für Musik Karlsruhe. His interest in conducting began in his mid-20's. Gabel won the Donatella Flick Conducting Competition in November 2004, and subsequently served as an assistant conductor with the London Symphony Orchestra as a result of this award.

Gabel was music director of the Orchestre Symphonique de Québec from 2012 to 2021. Gabel served as music director of the Orchestre Français des Jeunes, initially for the period from 2017 to 2018, and subsequently continuing through 2020. In 2019, Gabel first guest-conducted the Tonkünstler Orchestra. In June 2023, the Tonkünstler Orchestra announced the appointment of Gabel as its next principal conductor, effective with the 2025-2026 season, with an initial contract of four years.

== Discography ==
- "Ne Me Refuse Pas" with Marie-Nicole Lemieux and the Orchestre National de France (Naïve)
- Oeuvres de Lucien Guerinel with the Orchestre National de France
- Saint-Saëns, Tchaikovsky, works for cello and orchestra: Stéphane Tétreault and the Orchestre Symphonique de Québec (Analekta)
- Tchaikovsky and Rachmaninov with Natasha Paremski and The Royal Philharmonic
- Saint-Saëns: Piano Concerto No. 2 and Piano Concerto No. 5; Louis Schwizgebel-Wang, piano; BBC Symphony Orchestra, cond. Martyn Brabbins & Fabien Gabel (Aparté, 2015)

== Awards and honours ==
- 1st prize for Trumpet at the Conservatoire National Supérieur de Musique de Paris (1996)
- Winner of the Donatella Flick Conducting Competition (2004)
- The 'Académie Charles Cros' award 2011 (Naïve recording)

Cultural offices
Preceded by Yoav Talmi	Music Director, Orchestre Symphonique de Québec; 2012–2021	Succeeded by Clemens Schuldt
Preceded by David Zinman	Music Director, Orchestre Français des Jeunes; 2017–2020	Succeeded by Michael Schønwandt
