= Orchestre Français des Jeunes =

National youth orchestra of France

- Youth orchestra
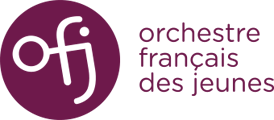
- Short name: OFJ
- Founded: 1982
- Location: Paris, France
- Principal conductor: Kristiina Poska
- Website: www.ofj.fr

The Orchestre Français des Jeunes (literal translation: French Youth Orchestra, French: [ɔʁkɛstʁə fʁɑ̃sɛ de ʒœn], OFJ) is the national youth orchestra of France. The OFJ is a member of the European Federation of National Youth Orchestras.

== History ==
The French Ministry of Culture founded the OFJ in 1982. It consists of young musicians of ages 16 to 25, selected by audition.

In 2013, to mark the 50th anniversary of the Élysée Treaty, the OFJ performed a series of concerts together with its German counterpart, the Bundesjugendorchester, under the direction of Dennis Russell Davies.

Michael Schønwandt served as music director of the OFJ from 2021 to the close of 2024. In September 2023, the OFJ announced the appointment of Kristiina Poska as its next music director, the first female conductor ever named to the post, effective in the summer of 2025. Poska formally assumed the post as of January 2025, ahead of the originally announced schedule.

== Music directors ==
- Jérôme Kaltenbach (1982–1983)
- Emmanuel Krivine (1984–1985)
- Sylvain Cambreling (1986)
- Emmanuel Krivine (1987–1991)
- Marek Janowski (1992–1998)
- Jesús López Cobos (1998–2001)
- Emmanuel Krivine (2001–2004)
- Jesus Lopez Cobos (2004)
- Jean-Claude Casadesus (2005–2008)
- Dennis Russell Davies (2008)
- Kwamé Ryan (2009–2010)
- Dennis Russell Davies (2011-2014)
- David Zinman (2015–2016)
- Fabien Gabel (2017–2020)
- Michael Schønwandt (2021–2024)
- Kristiina Poska (2025–present)

== See also ==
- List of youth orchestras
