= Theater Basel =

Opera house and drama theatre in Basel, Switzerland

Coordinates: 47°33′10″N 7°35′24″E

- Founded as Basler Stadttheater in 1834
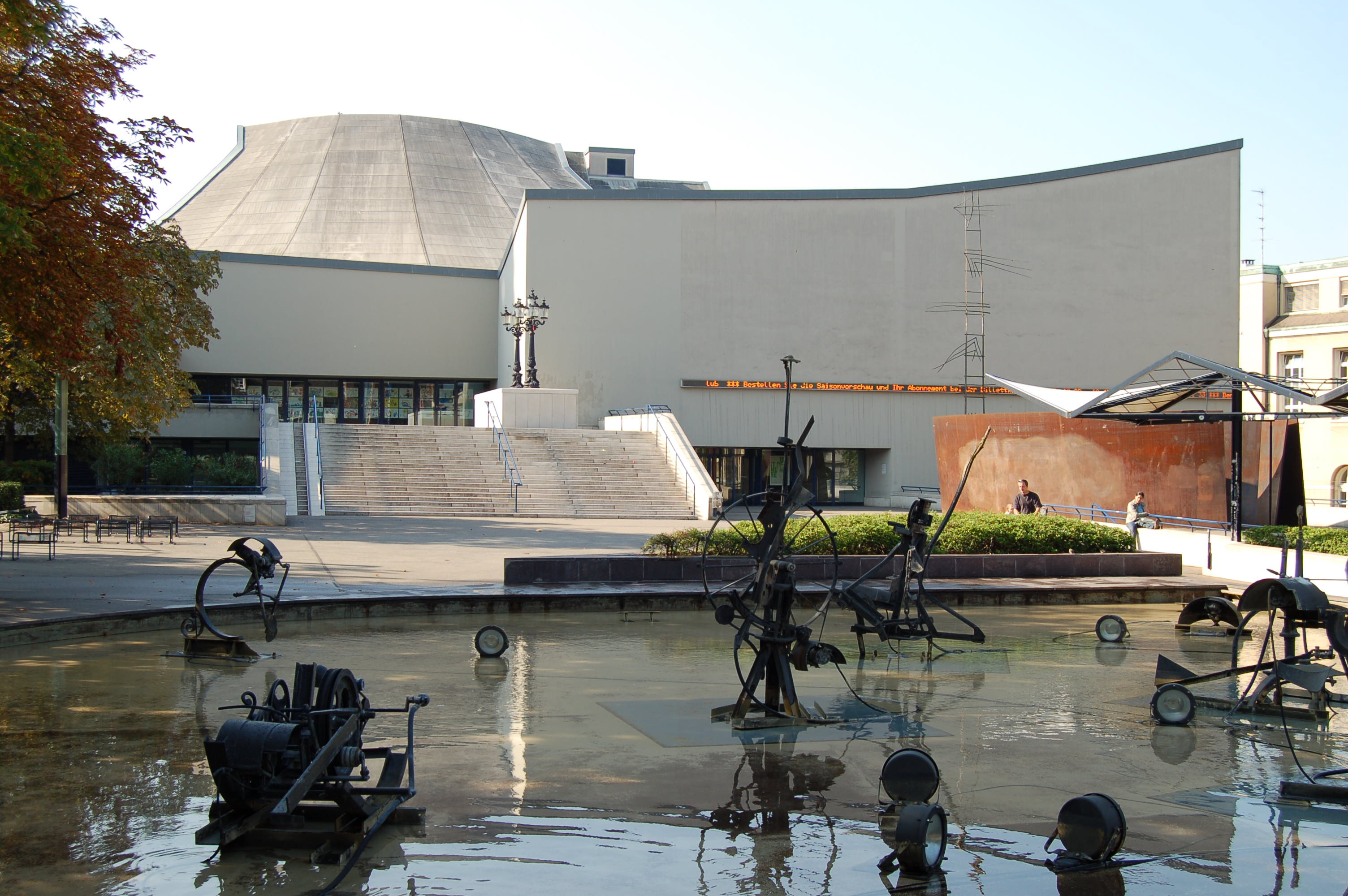
- Interactive map of Theater Basel
- Address: Basel; Switzerland
- Owner: City government of Basel, Switzerland
- Type: Municipal

Construction
- Opened: 1834 (first building (as Basler Stadttheater)); 1875 (second building); 1909 (third building); 1975 (fourth building)
- Demolished: 7 October 1904 (2nd building destroyed by fire)
- Years active: since 1834
- Architects: Melchior Berri (first building); Johann Jakob Stehlin der Jüngere (second building)

Tenants
- Opera and ballet companies (among other uses)

Website
- www.theater-basel.ch/en

Theater Basel is the municipal theatre of the city of Basel, Switzerland, which is home to the city's opera and ballet companies. The theatre also presents plays and musicals in addition to operas and operettas.

Because the theatre does not have its own orchestra, the Basel Symphony Orchestra is usually contracted to perform for opera and ballet productions as needed. For baroque-opera productions, La Cetra, the baroque orchestra of the Schola Cantorum Basiliensis, is engaged.

== History ==
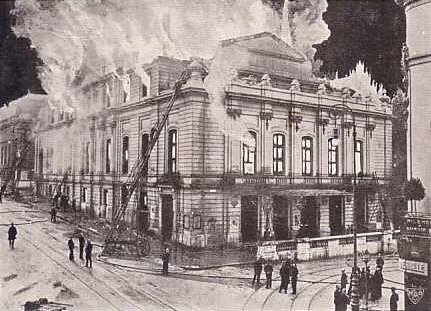
Theater Basel's second theatre which was destroyed by fire in 1904 (postcard from 1904).

Theater Basel was founded in 1834 under the name Basler Stadttheater. The first theatre was designed by Swiss architect Melchior Berri.

In 1873, work on a new theatre began which was designed by Johann Jakob Stehlin Jr.. This second theatre opened in 1875 and was used until it was destroyed by fire on 7 October 1904.

Plans for a third theatre were soon made, but it was five years before the theatre finally opened in 1909. The fourth theatre opened in 1975.

Kristiina Poska was the most recent general music director (GMD; Generalmusikdirektorin) of the company, the first female conductor to hold the post, appointed in October 2018 and effective with the 2019–2020 season. She held the post for the 2019–2020 season.

== Intendants ==
- Leo Melitz (1899–1919)
- Ernst Lert (1919–1920)
- Otto Henning (1921–1925)
- Oskar Wälterlin (1925–1932)
- Egon Neudegg (1932–1949)
- Gottfried Becker, Kurt Horowitz, Hans Thudium (1949–1950; joint directors)
- Friedrich Schramm (1950–1953)
- Albert Wiesner (1953–1954)
- Hermann Wedekind (1954–1960)
- Werner Düggelin (1968–1975)
- Hans Hollmann (1975–1978)
- Horst Statkus (1978–1988)
- Frank Baumbauer (1988–1993)
- Wolfgang Zörner (1993–1994)
- Hans Peter Doll (1994–1996)
- Michael Schindhelm (1996–2006)
- Georges Delnon (2006–2015)
- Andreas Beck (2015–2020)
- Benedikt von Peter (2021–present)

== General Music Directors ==
- Gottfried Becker (1928–1942)
- Gottfried Becker, Alexander Krannhals (joint Generalmusikdirektoren, 1942–1949)
- Alexander Krannhals (1949–1953)
- Hans Münch (1953–1957)
- Silvio Varviso (1956–1962)
- Paul Jamin (1962–1964)
- Hans Löwlein (1964–1972)
- Armin Jordan (1972–1989)
- Michael Boder (1989–1993)
- Erik Nielsen (2016–2019)
- Kristiina Poska (2019–2020)
