= Schloss Grafenegg =

Castle in Grafenegg, Austria

Coordinates: 48°25′43″N 15°44′46″E

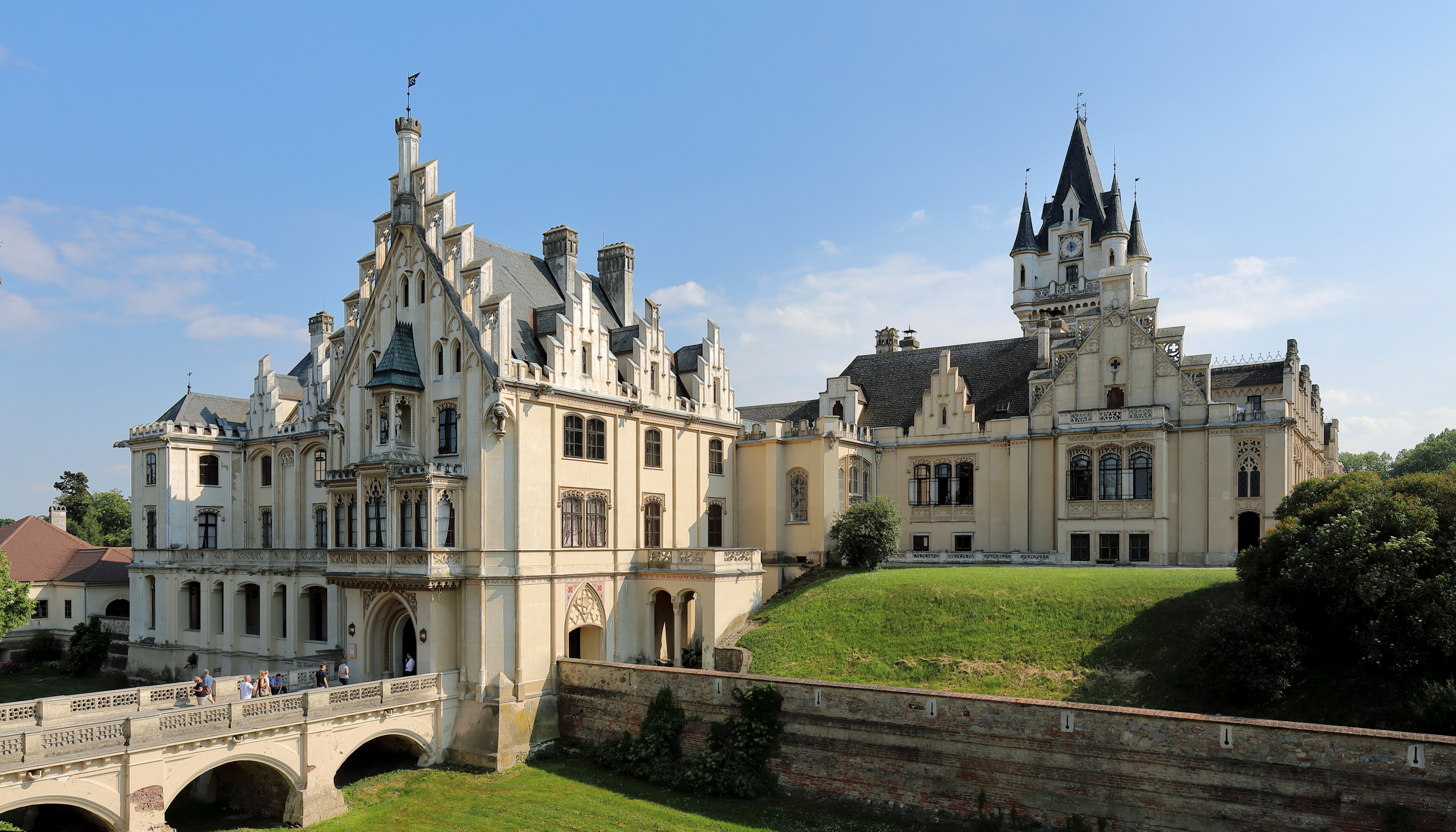
Schloss Grafenegg - the north wing

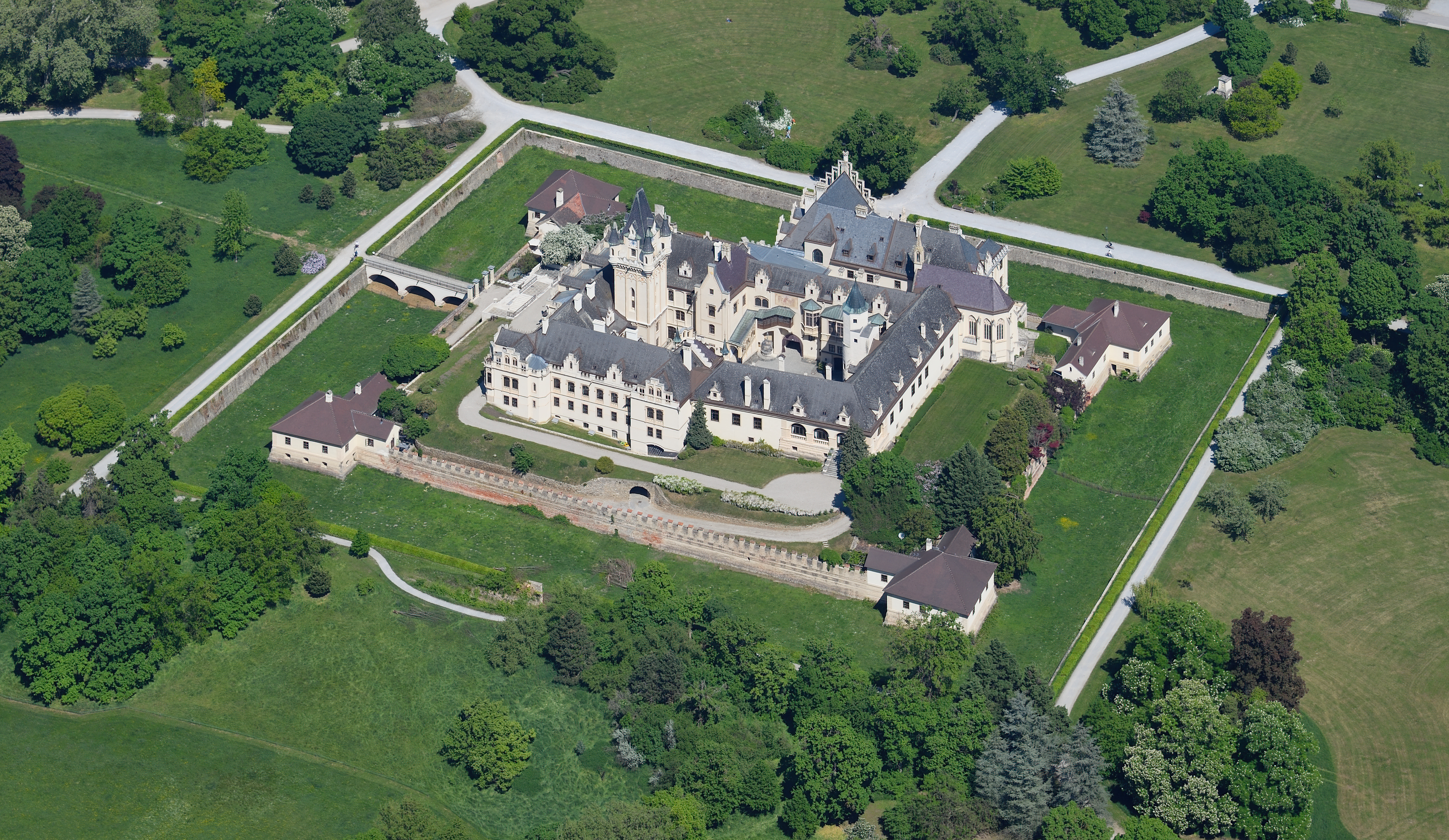
Schloss Grafenegg from the air

Schloss Grafenegg is a castle in Grafenegg, Lower Austria, Austria. Together with Burg Kreuzenstein and Schloss Anif near Salzburg, it is considered to be an outstanding example of romantic historical architecture in Austria.

== History ==
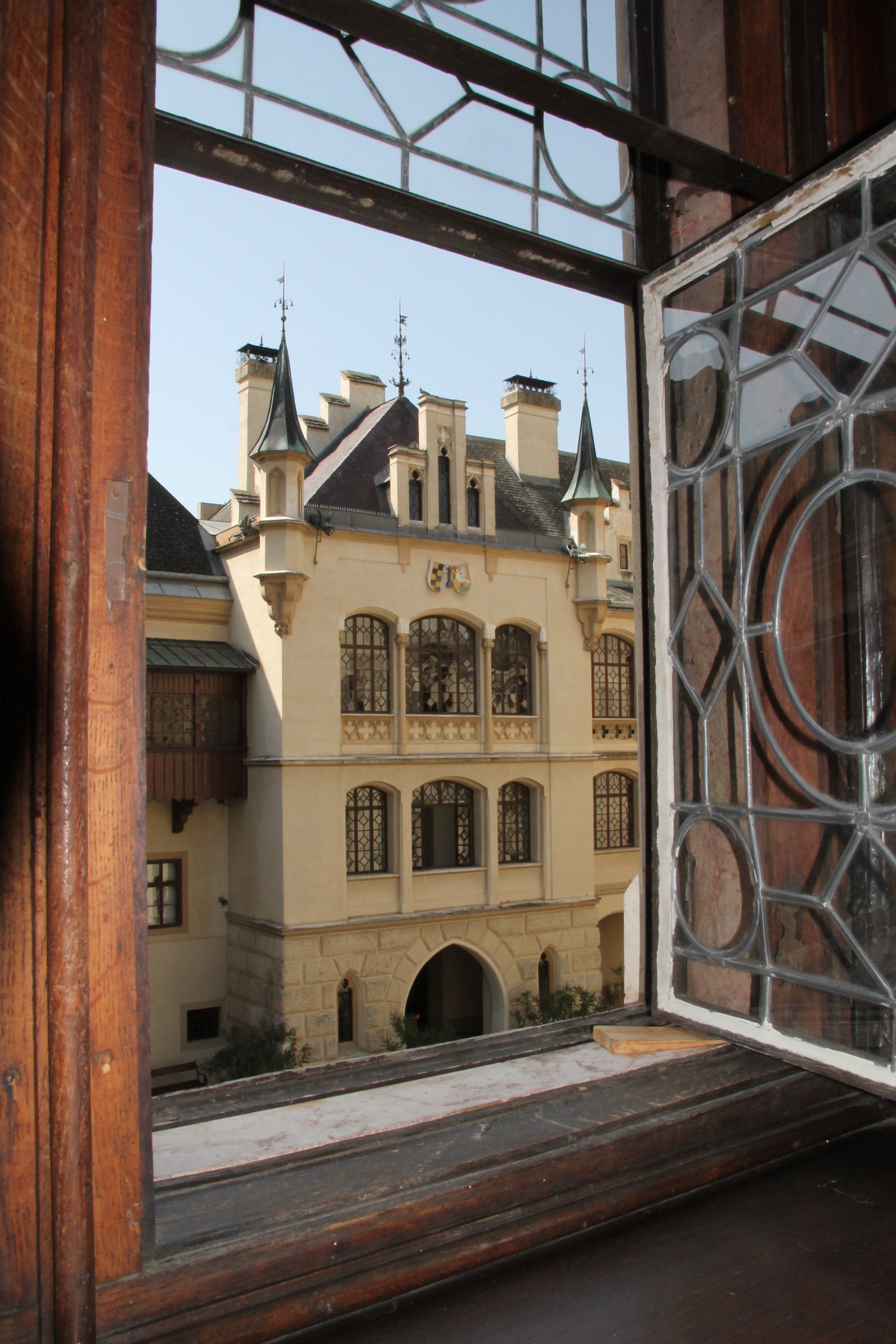
View from the window at the courtyard

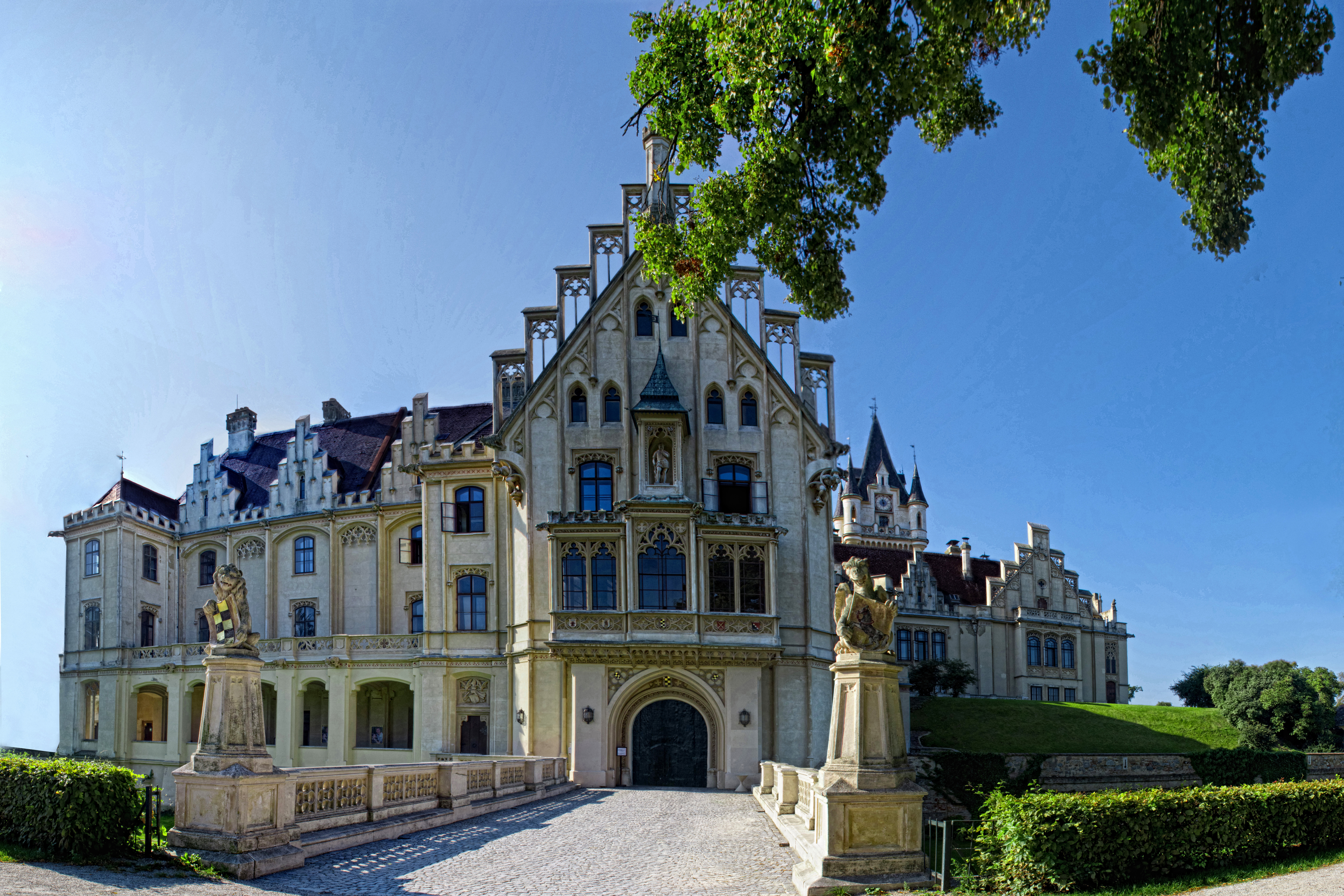
Schloss Grafenegg - the entrance

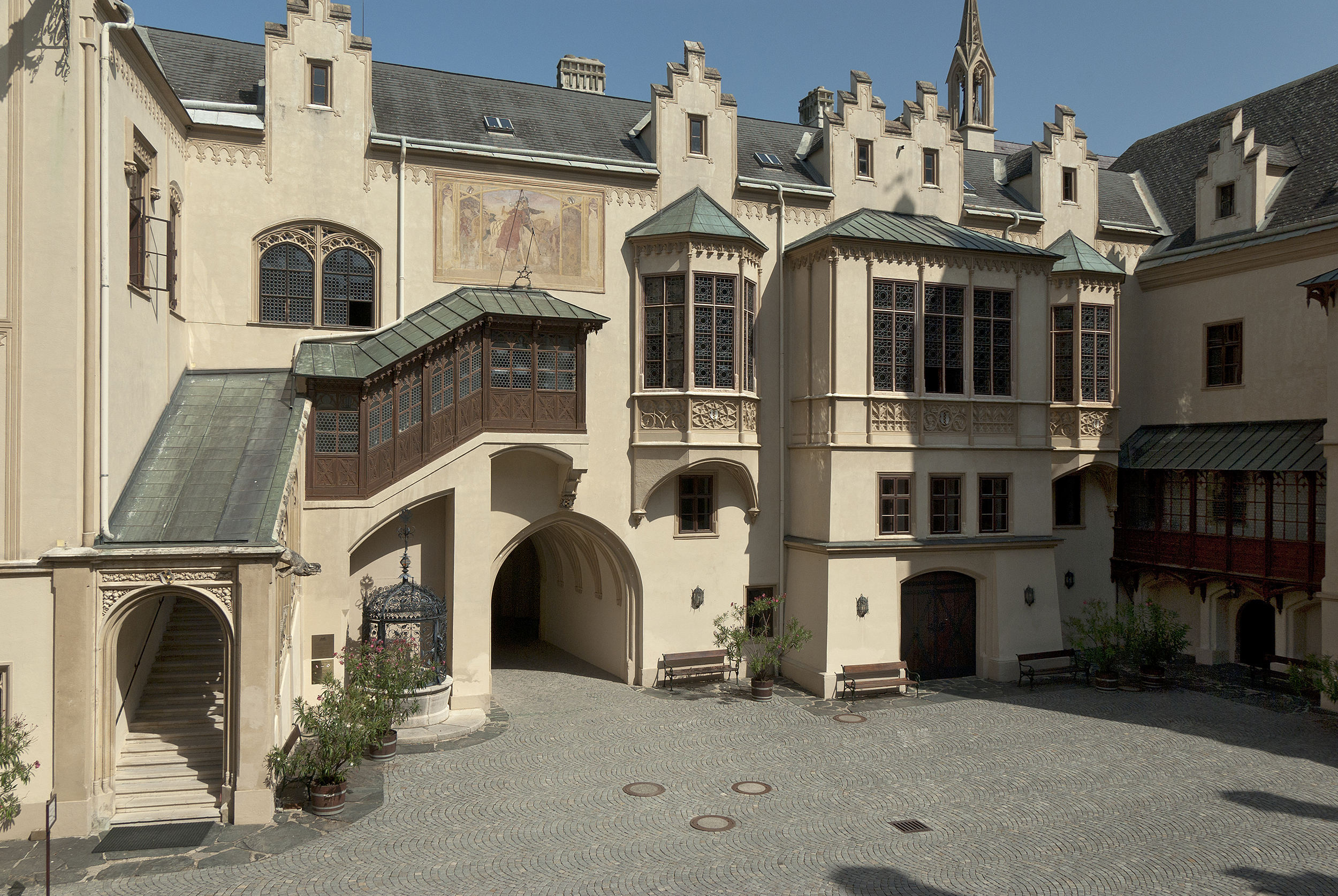
Schloss Grafenegg - the courtyard

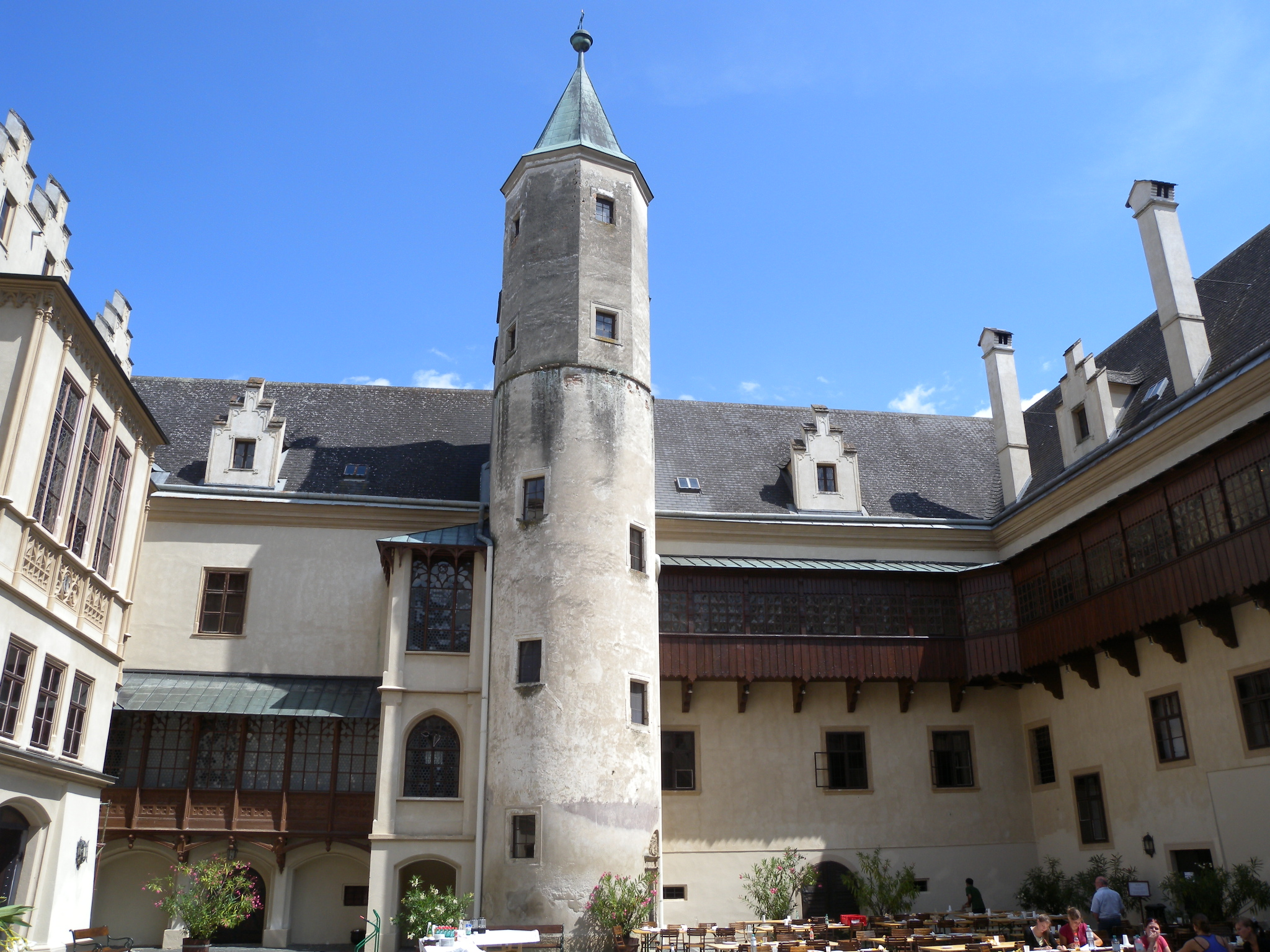
The medieval courtyard

=== Middle Ages ===
In 1294, a small settlement named Espersdorf was mentioned for the first time on the current site of Schloss Grafenegg. At these times, there were only a mill and a farmstead. After 1435, the site was surrounded by a ring wall and a moat. It received the name Grafenegg in the second half of the 15th century, when it came into possession of its namesake Ulrich von Grafenegg. It passed to Holy Roman emperor Frederick III in 1477. His son, emperor Maximilian I sold it to Heinrich Prüschenk, whose son Johann I Count Hardegg reconstructed the castle around 1500. The slender tower in the east wing dates from this late gothic period. In 1536, Bernhard I Thurzó acquired the castle and the lordship of Grafenegg. He had the portal to east tower constructed in Renaissance style in 1538. Also, he founded the Grafenegger branch of the Thurzó family, which died out with his son Bernhard II in 1596. The castle was inherited by his daughter Benigna, who was married to Martin von Starhemberg.

=== Verdenberg period ===
After several changes of ownership, Johann Baptist Verda von Verdenberg, chancellor and confidant of emperor Ferdinand II and his son emperor Ferdinand III, had the complex converted into a fortified palace between 1622 and 1633. At the four corners of the castle, surrounded by walls and a moat, so-called rampart houses were built, which still exist today. During the Thirty Years' War, these were used to set up artillery pieces. Nevertheless, the castle was still taken by Swedish troops in 1645 and temporarily occupied. In the course of the reconstruction work, a chapel was completed in the north wing in 1633, which was dedicated to the Holy Trinity.

=== Counts of Breuner-Enckevoirt ===
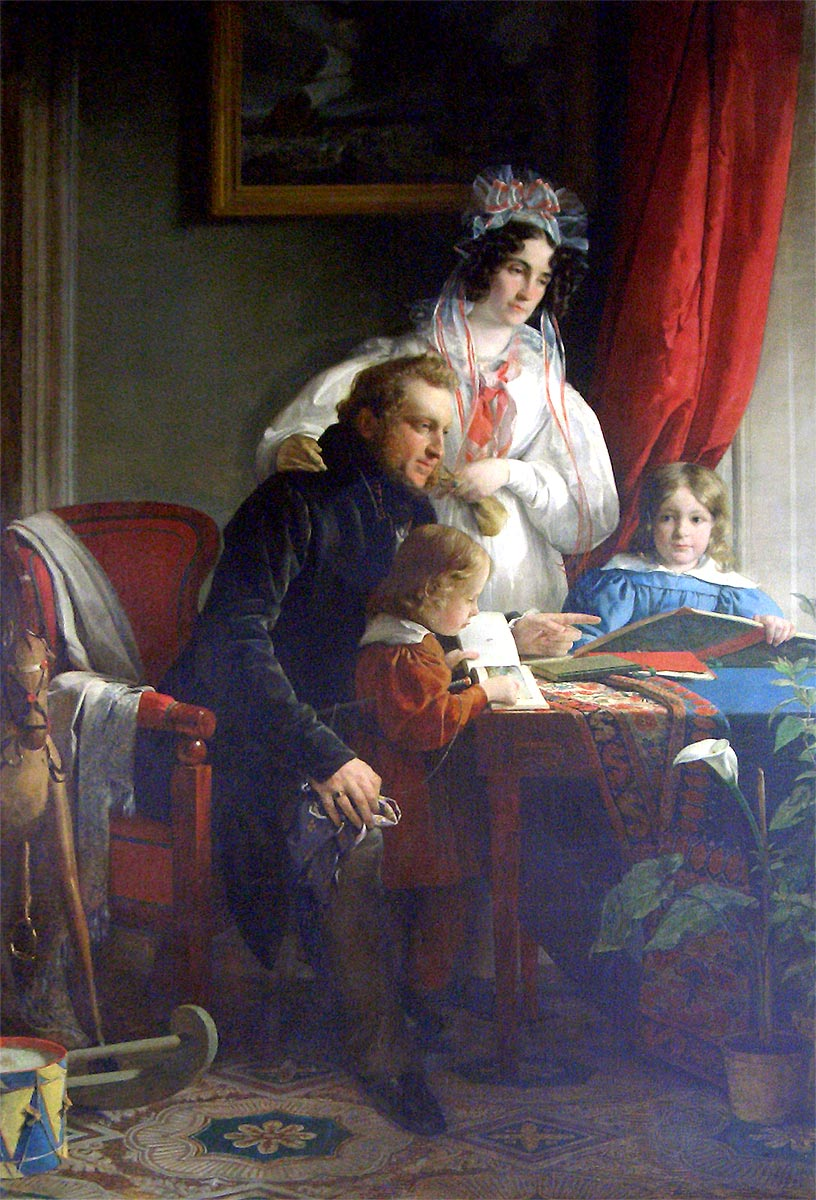
Count August von Breuner-Enckevoirt with his family

From the Verdenberg family, the castle and its estates passed to the Counts of Enckevort and subsequently to the Counts of Breuner. Count August von Breuner-Enckevoirt (1796-1877) inherited Schloss Grafenegg in 1813. He and his son August Johann (1828-1894) reconstructed the castle between 1840 and 1888 in the spirit of romantic historicism with help of father and son Leopold and Hugo Ernst. Leopold Ernst was also the master builder of the St. Stephen's Cathedral in Vienna. They fully redesigned the castle into its current form. The Breuner counts lost a large part of their fortune during the financial crisis of 1873. As a result, a planned mighty dome on the south-east side was never constructed, and the castle's character remains better preserved today.

=== Dukes of Ratibor and princes of Corvey ===
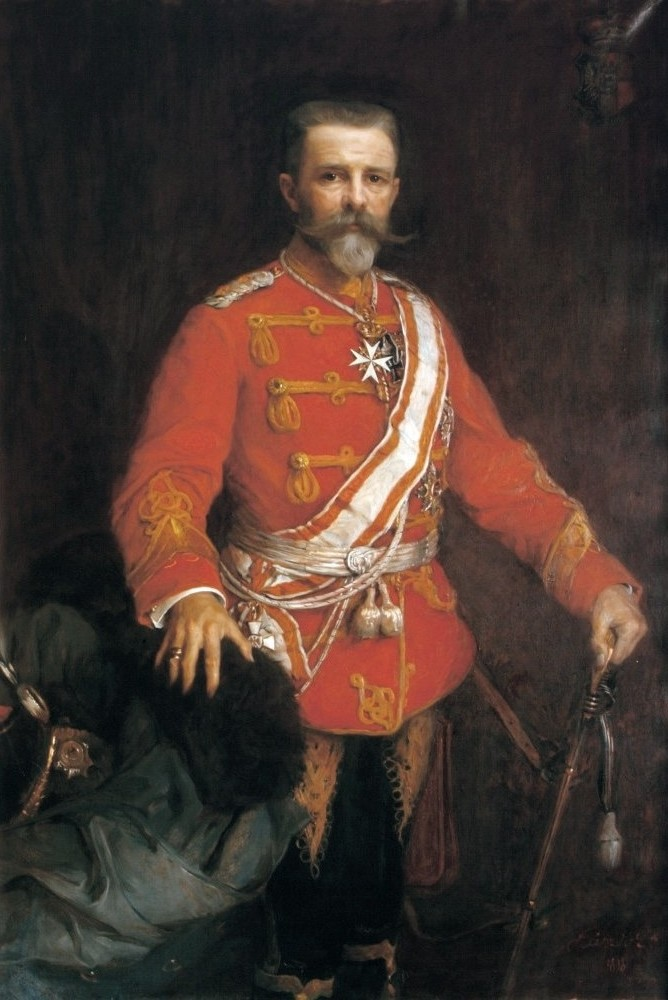
Duke Victor II painting by Philip de László (1898)

When count August Johann died in 1894, Schloss Grafenegg was inherited by his daughter Marie Breunner-Enckevoirth (1856-1929), who was married to Viktor II, Duke of Ratibor and prince of Corvey (1847-1923). Since then the ducal house of Ratibor and Corvey (Hohenlohe-Waldenburg-Schillingsfürst) has been the owner of the castle, a branch of the princely house of Hohenlohe. The surname of the family changed when Viktor II's grandson, Franz-Albrecht (1920-2009), was adopted by princess Clementine von Metternich-Sandor and he took her name (Metternich-Sandór) instead. Grafenegg was not the main residence of the dukes of Ratibor, as their main houses were in Germany: Schloss Corvey in North Rhine-Westphalia and Schloss Rauden in Silesia (nowadays Rudy in Poland). Between 1945 and 1955, the castle was heavily damaged by Russian occupying forces. Most of the furniture, art collection and library was either stolen, burned or destroyed. With help of the Austrian Federal and Lower Austria governments, Franz-Albrecht started restoration works in 1967. Also, he made he castle accessible to the general public.

== Architecture ==
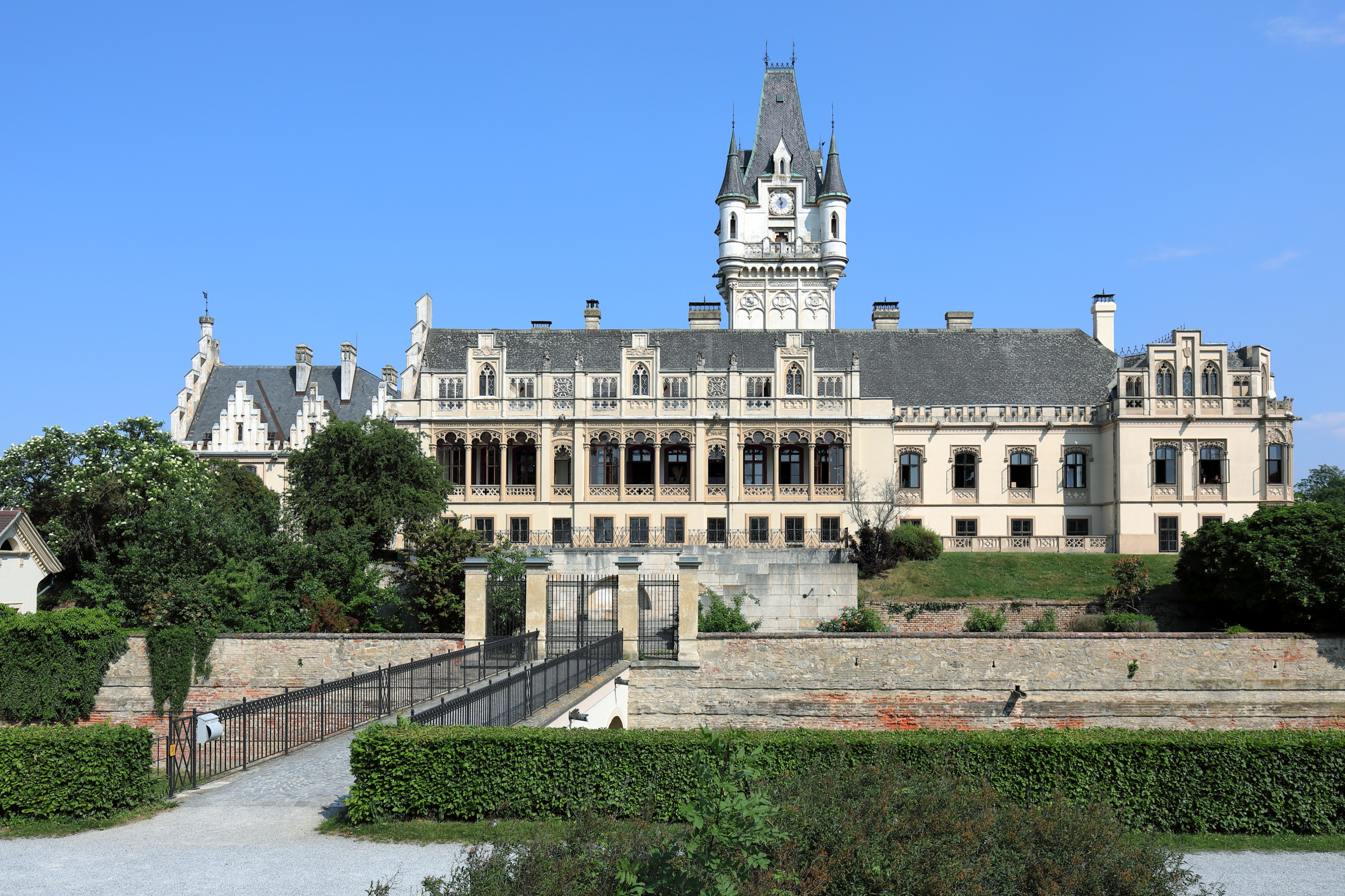
Schloss Grafenegg - the west wing

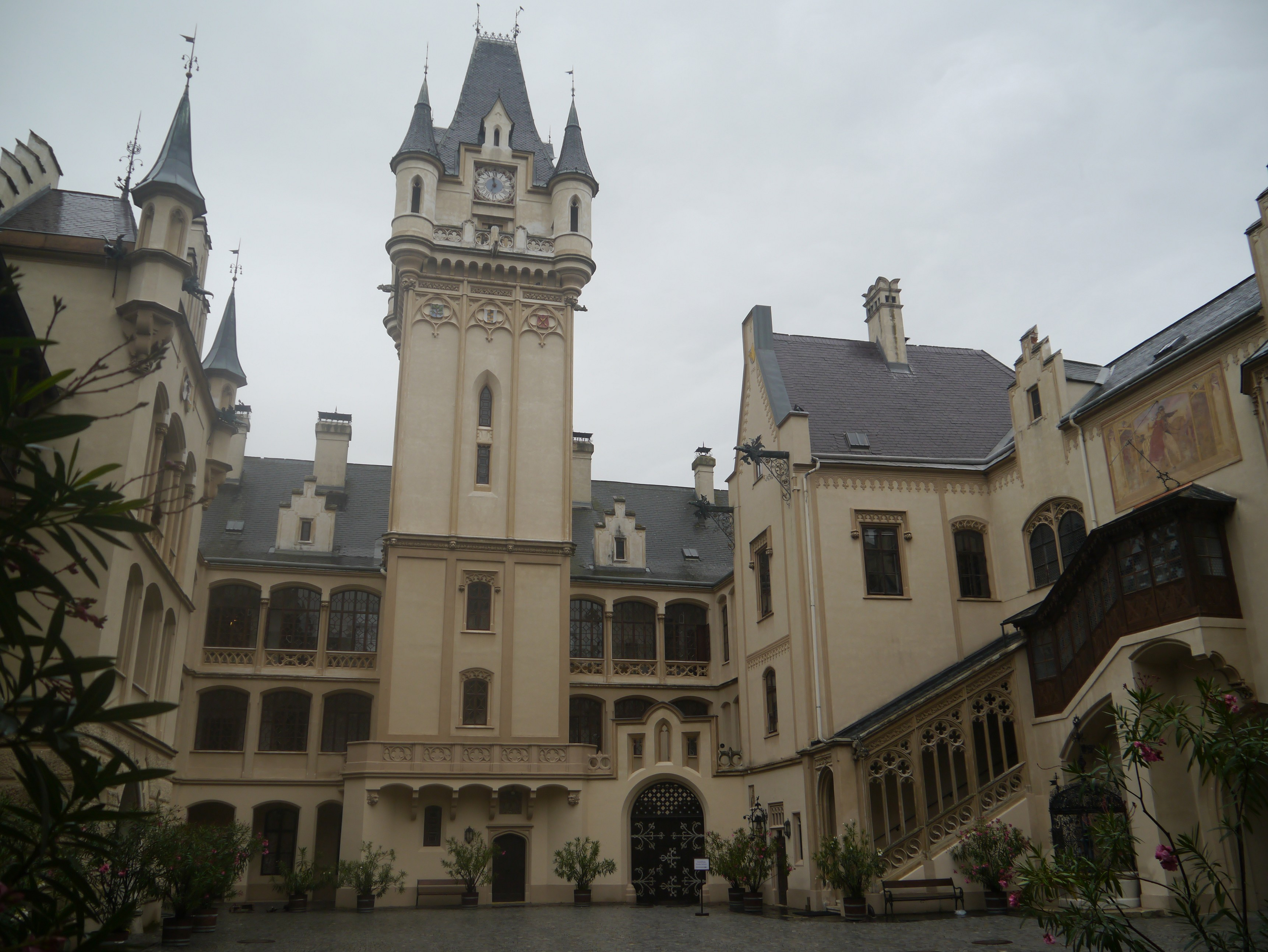
Schloss Grafenegg - the court yard

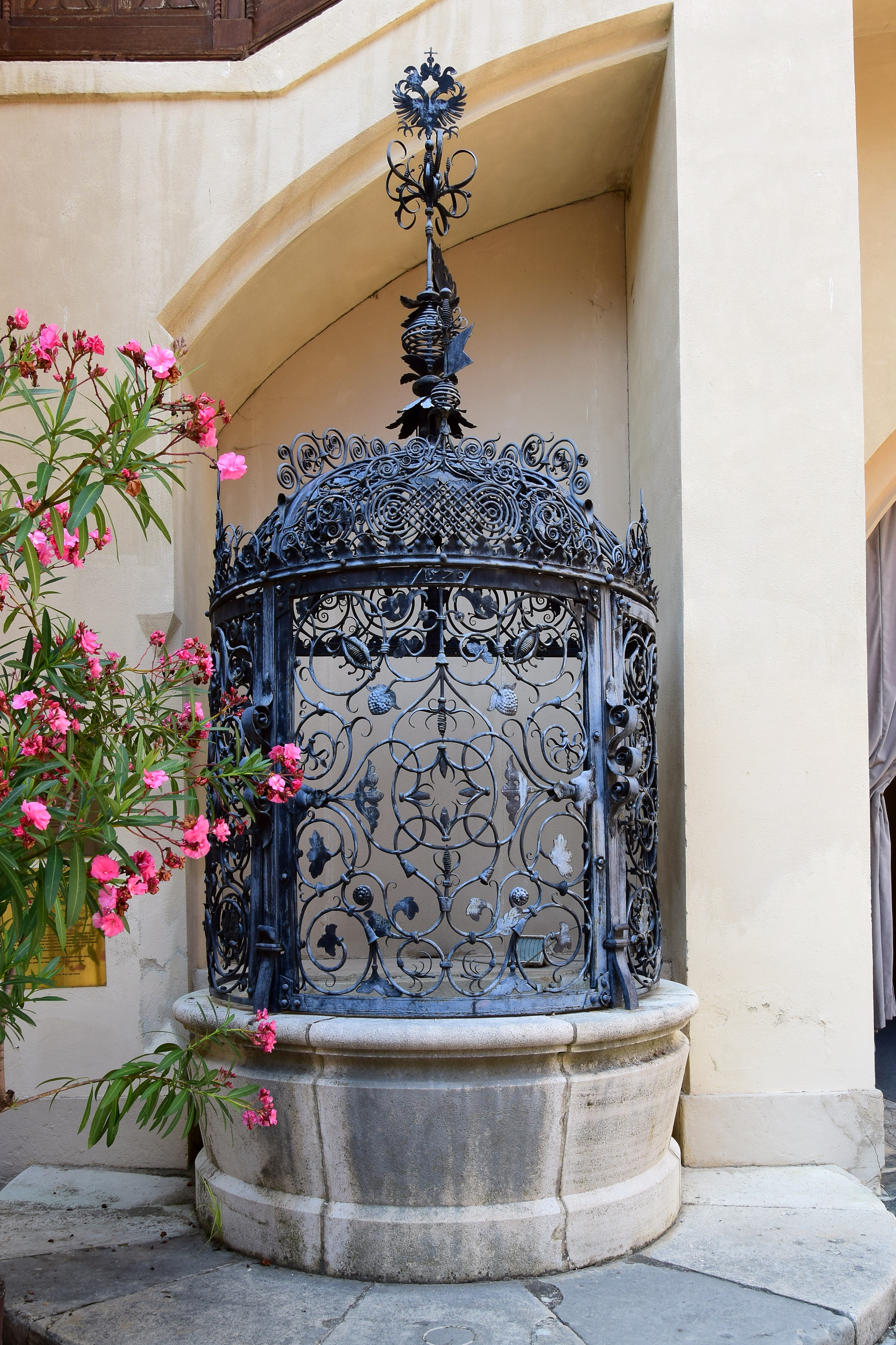
Schloss Grafenegg - the fountain in the court yard

The 19th century conversion by the architects Leopold and Hugo Ernst left the nucleus of the existing building almost fully intact. However, they gave the castle exterior a completely different impression by adding stepped gables, arcades and facade decoration in a neo-gothic Tudor style. Ludwig Wächtler was responsible for the interior decoration, which was largely in Renaissance Revival architecture. The closed complex consists of four wings arranged around an inner courtyard. Starting from the north wing, the conversion progressed counterclockwise in the 19th century.

=== North wing ===
From the north, one enters Schloss Grafenegg over the castle bridge through the neo-gothic gate building. The bridge dates from 1857 and is decorated with coat of arms. The gate building was constructed between 1856 and 1858. Directly above the entrance, under a canopy, a knight statue, dating from 1856, depicts the builder, Count August Ferdinand Breuner-Enckevoirt. After the gate, you walk through a rib vault from the early 16th century, which runs at a slight angle to the bridge, and leads into the castle courtyard. Even before the courtyard, you reach the castle chapel on the left and the main staircase on the right.

Construction of the palace chapel to the east of the north wing started in 1846 and was inaugurated in 1853. It has a radiant color (polychrome) and contains a late Gothic winged altarpiece from 1491, whose shrine figures represent the Coronation of the Virgin. The south wall of the chapel courtyard - between the entrance and the chapel - shows the coats of arms of all Grafenegg owners up to Count August Ferdinand Breuner-Enckevoirt.

The main staircase, which was largely completed in 1851, is located in the western part of the north wing. The staircase of Strawberry Hill House near Twickenham served as example. The figure of a knight on the lowest base of the parapet embodies the ideal of the builder. He is immortalized in a portrait bust, with a purse in his hand. The person opposite shows the master builder Leopold Ernst with a blueprint and compass.

On the upper floor, there is the knight's hall, completed in 1851, the showpiece of the castle, so to speak, in which the most precious materials - various woods, leather, marble and metal - were processed. Several suits of armor (not preserved) were placed around a central chimney. The knight's hall has a remarkable coffer ceiling and three courtyard-side bay windows with coat of arms panes in the glazing. Today's murals show secular and spiritual figures from the House of Habsburg.

To the west is the 'Wappenstube', which was probably completed in the late 1850s. On the wooden ceiling it shows the coats of arms of 128 ancestors of Countess Agathe Maria Breuner, who was married in 1855 to August Johann Breuner, the client's son.

=== West wing ===
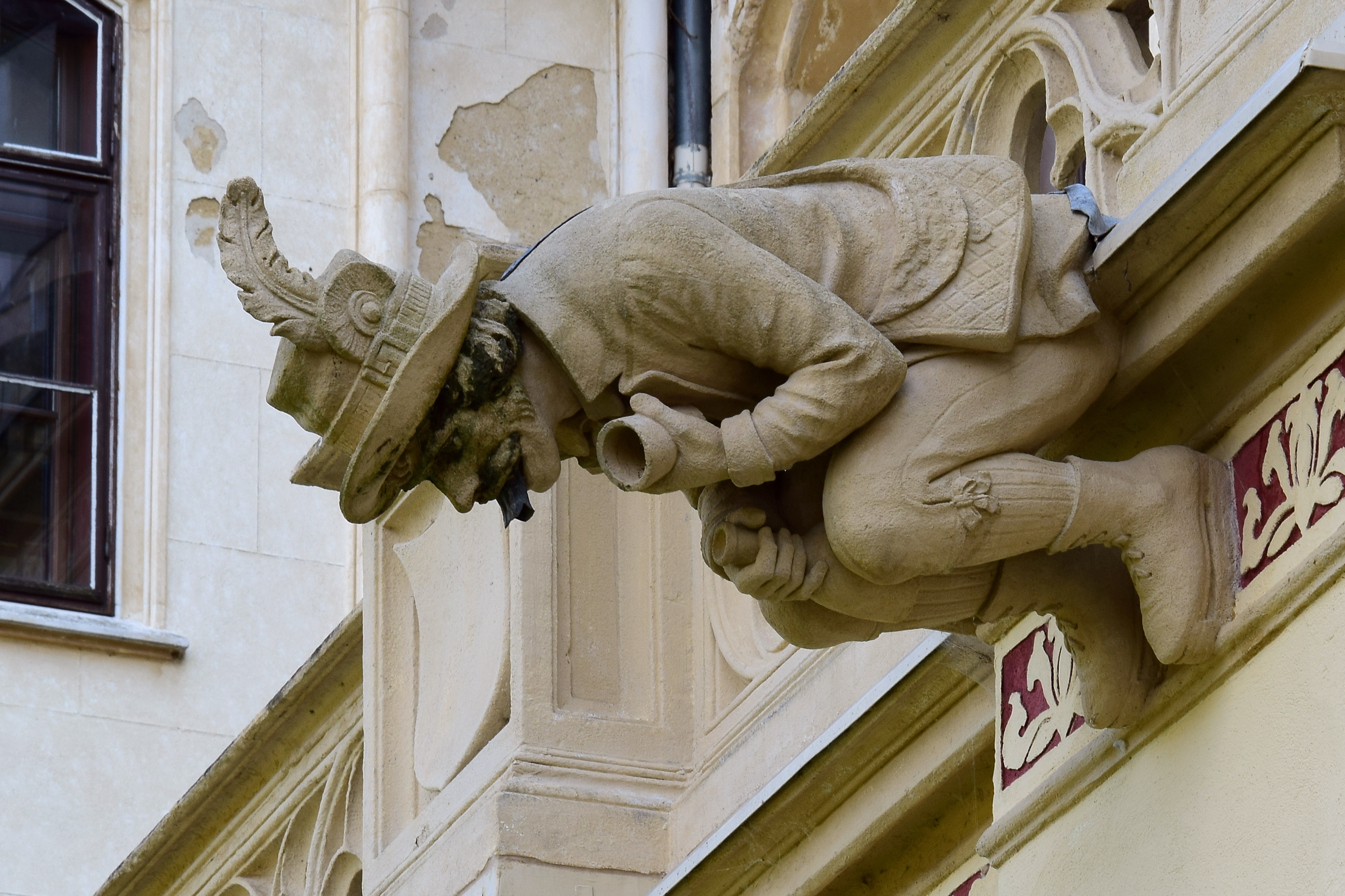
A gargoyle in the courtyard

On the west side of the castle, there is a monumental loggia, which was completed in 1863. A few years later, it was decorated with cheerful ceiling paintings and grotesque console figurines. The main tower from 1861 is crowned with so-called bartizans. It is located in front of the west wing towards the castle courtyard. It forms a strong contrast to the slender late Gothic tower opposite on the east side of the castle courtyard.

All rooms on the main floor in the west wing are lavishly decorated with varied veneers, carved ornaments and figurative details. With the exception of the loggia, every room has a colourful historicist tiled stove.

In the north-west corner of the complex are the dining room and large salon – also known as the corner salon – with hammer-beam ceilings based on the English model, which are among the highest artistic achievements of historicism in Austria. In the large salon, the beam heads of the colorful ceiling are alternately decorated with knights and angels.

In the middle of the west wing are the rooms designed in 1866, the Yellow Salon (or Ladies' Salon), the Toilet Room (or Small Salon) and the Bathroom. The designs for the bedroom and the count's writing room in the south-west corner, known as the Blue Salon because of the wall painting, date from 1864. This is equipped with particularly magnificent wall paneling.

=== South and east wings ===
These parts were not redesigned until 1887-1888, with the outside front on the east going back to the 16th century essentially unchanged, with the exception of the projecting chancel of the castle chapel. The garden hall was built by Hugo Ernst in the south-east corner, while the three-room library in the east wing was redesigned in baroque revival style.

== Grounds and gardens ==
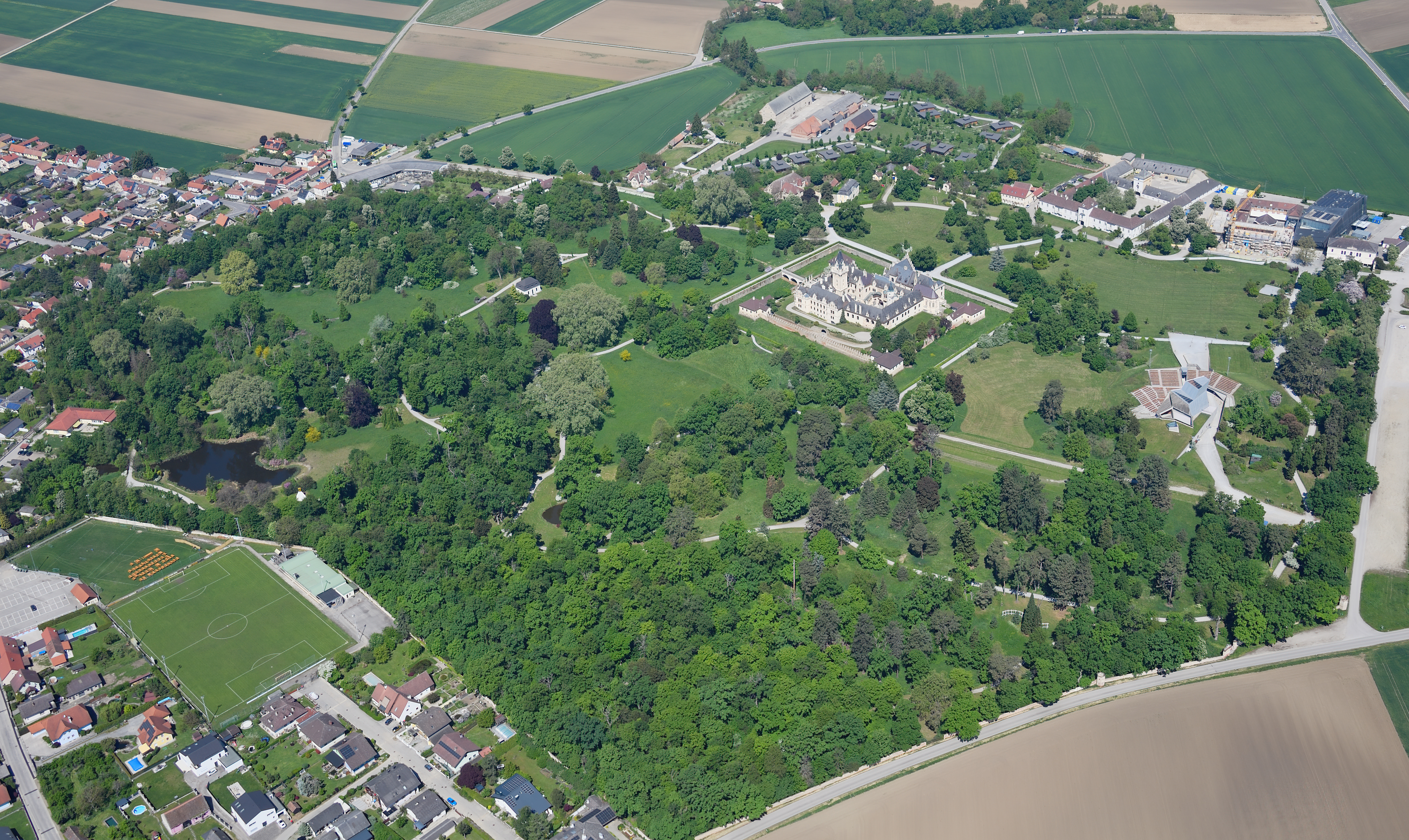
Aerial view of the garden and park

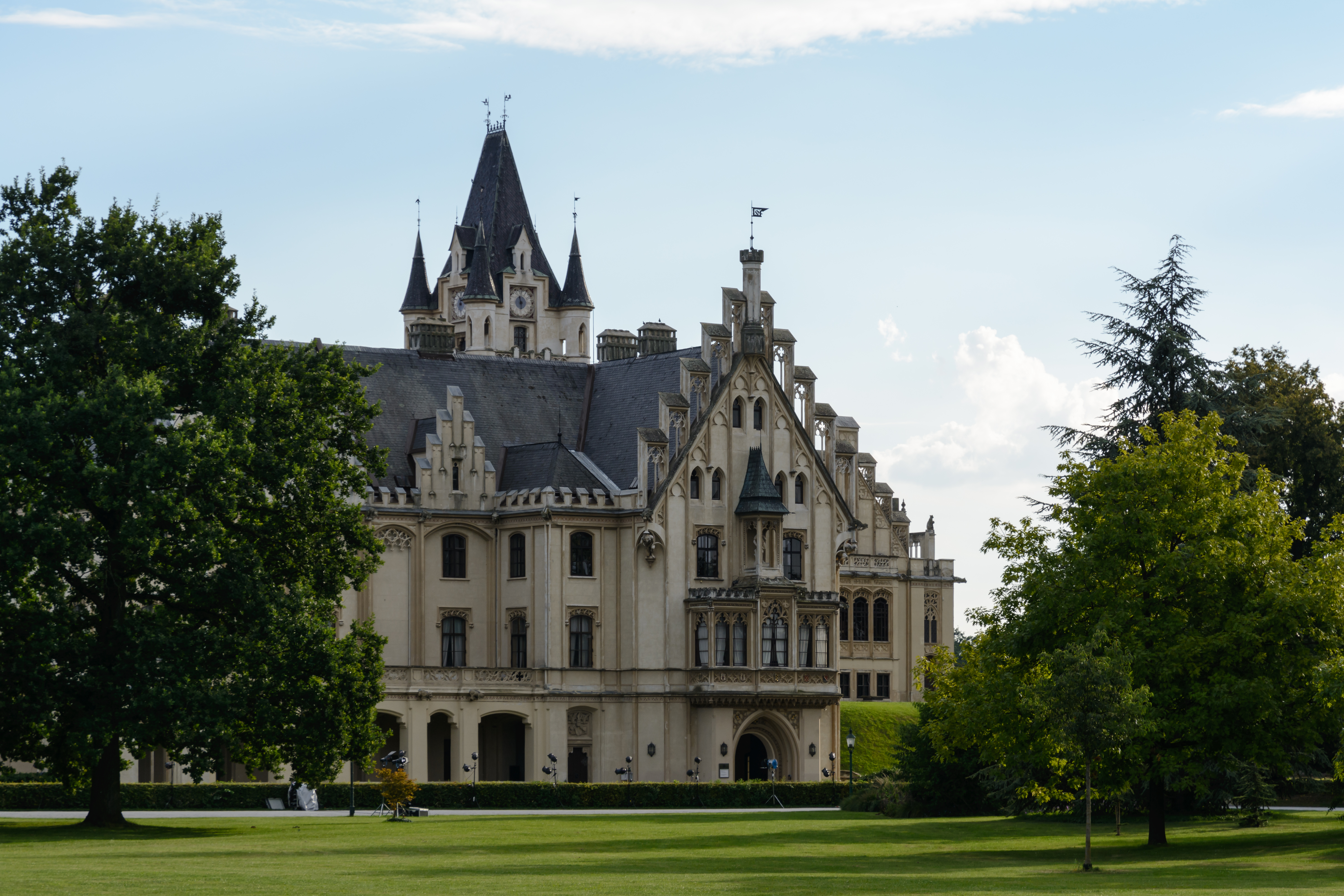
The castle seen from the park

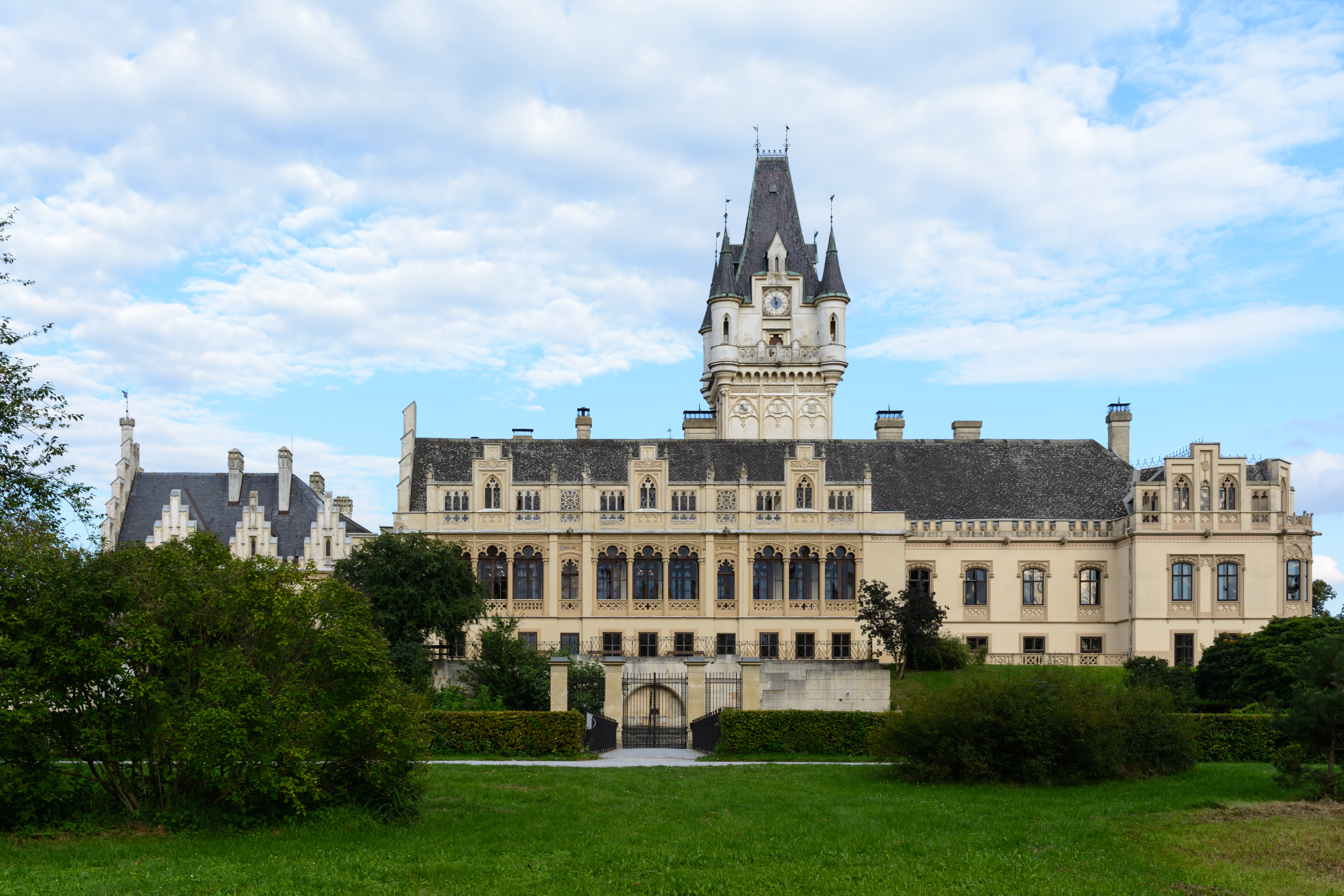
Another view from the park

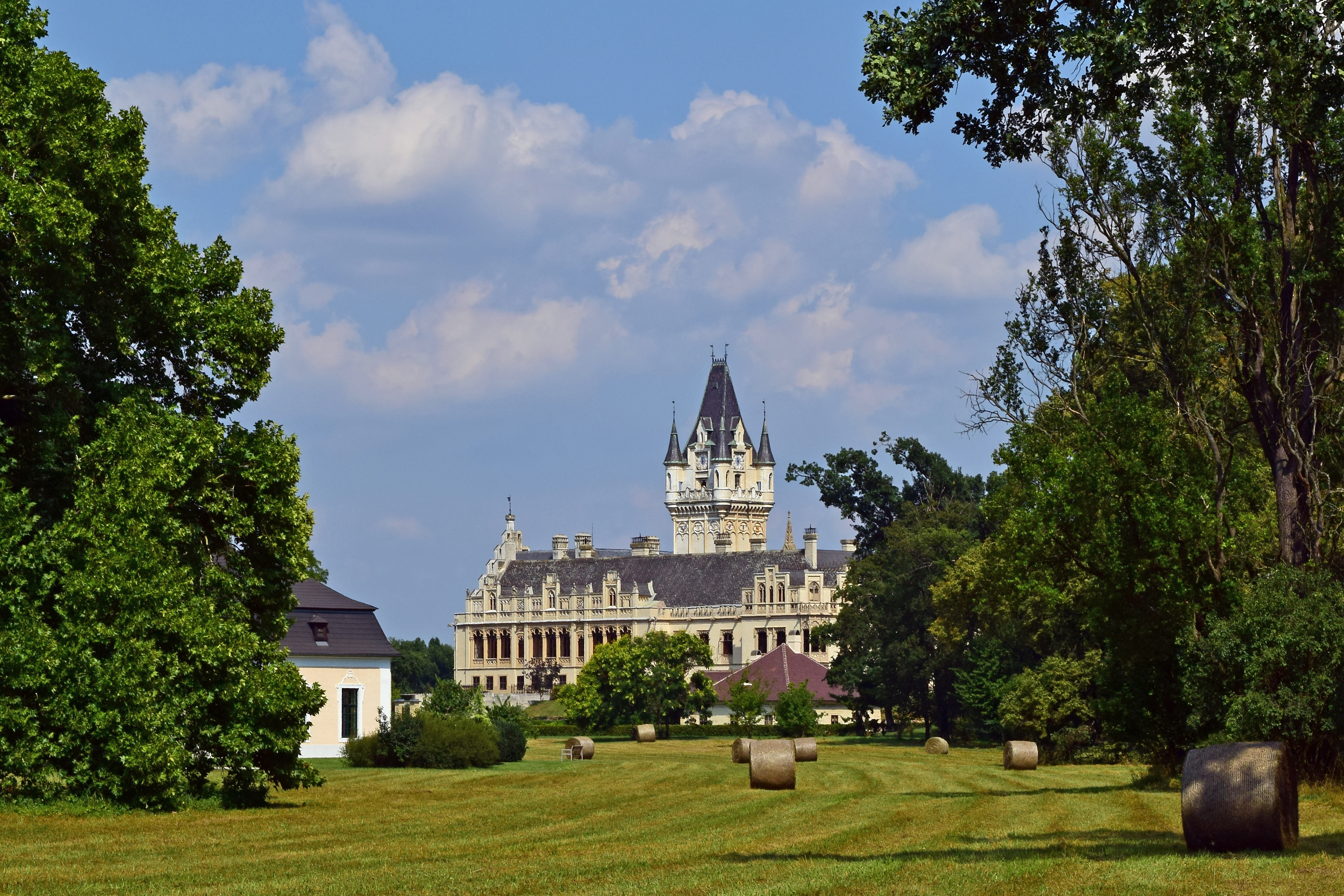
The castle and a baroque garden pavilion in the park

=== The garden and park ===
Schloss Grafenegg, its stables and other annexes are in the middle of a 32-hectare large park that is decorated with numerous sculptures.

Around the castle, there was a Baroque ornamental and pleasure garden, of which only the ruins of the theater pavilion and a group of figures of Hercules defeating the bull (today on the road to Grafenwörth, Grafenegger Riese) have survived.

Even before 1808 (first mentioned), a natural, romantic landscaped garden was laid out by Count August when the old outworks were partially demolished. The garden was then supplemented with elements of the English Garden, based on impressions brought back from trips between 1818 and 1837.

Under Count August Johann and Duke Victor Amadeus, the park was planted with numerous native and exotic conifers in the sense of an arboretum. Around 1910, 175 different species of conifers were found here. This old stock of trees and also the rich younger replanting are particularly valuable. Today there are more than 2,000 deciduous and coniferous trees and some giant trees that are more than 250 years old. The park is one of the most important garden architecture monuments in Austria and is mentioned in the Monument Protection Act (No. 12 in the appendix to § 1 Para. 12 DMSG).

For the Lower Austrian state garden show of 2008, the park was revitalized based on the design principles of a 19th-century landscape garden.

In 2007, the 'Wolkenturm' ('tower of clouds'), an open-air stage with 1,700 seats and 300 grass seats, was constructed in the park east of Schloss Grafenegg. The open-air pavilion was designed by the next ENTERprise (Marie-Therese Harnoncourt, Ernst J. Fuchs) and the landscape architects Land insicht. The sculptural building takes up the element of the amphitheater as a garden inventory of the type of baroque garden and quotes formal elements of the old stock in the park.

=== Gutshofsiedlung ===
On the northern edge of the park is the so called Gutshofsiedlung, a group of houses consisting of a porter's house, a mighty granary, two one-storey commercial wings, a mill, several residential buildings, a manager's house and a large farm. In 2008, the ensemble was expanded to include the Grafenegg auditorium, which was designed by the architects Schröder Schulte-ladbeck and Dieter Irresberger and sound-designed by the Munich acoustician Karlheinz Müller. This hall can serve for up to 1300 listeners a concert hall. The shape of the open, irregular, polyhedron glass building blends in with the old building.

== Schloss Grafenegg today ==
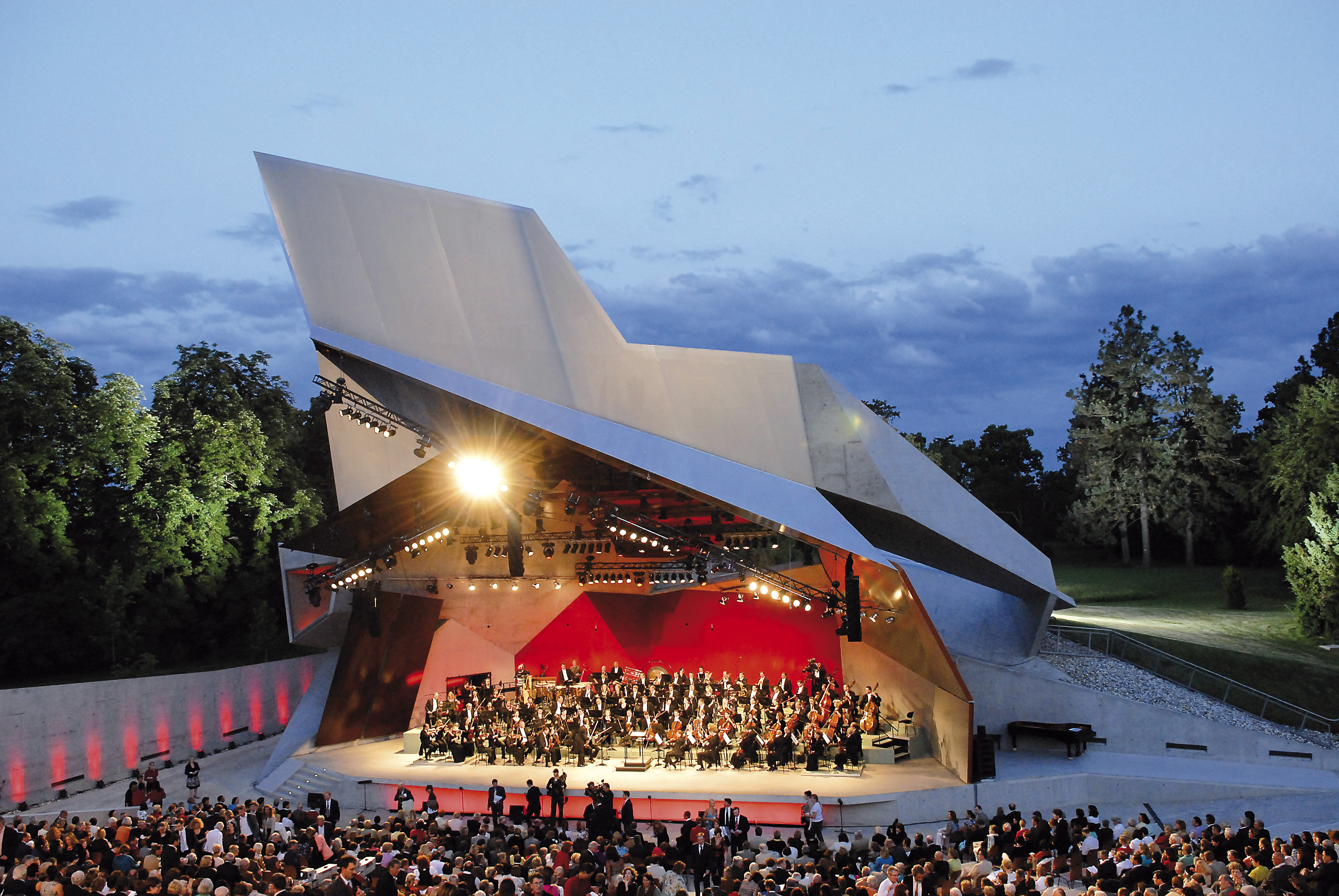
Open air stage 'Wolkenturm'

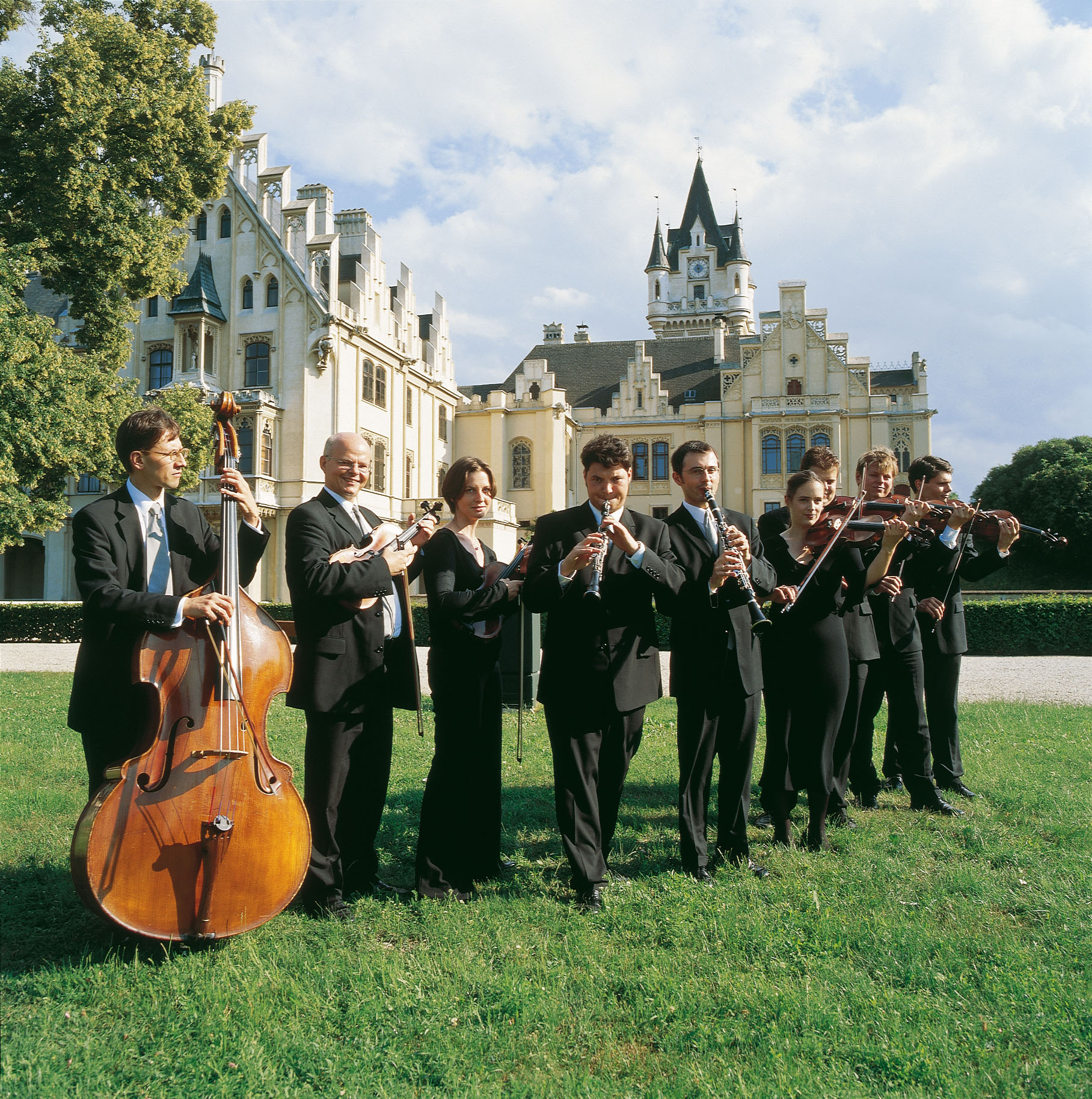
Musicians in the castle park

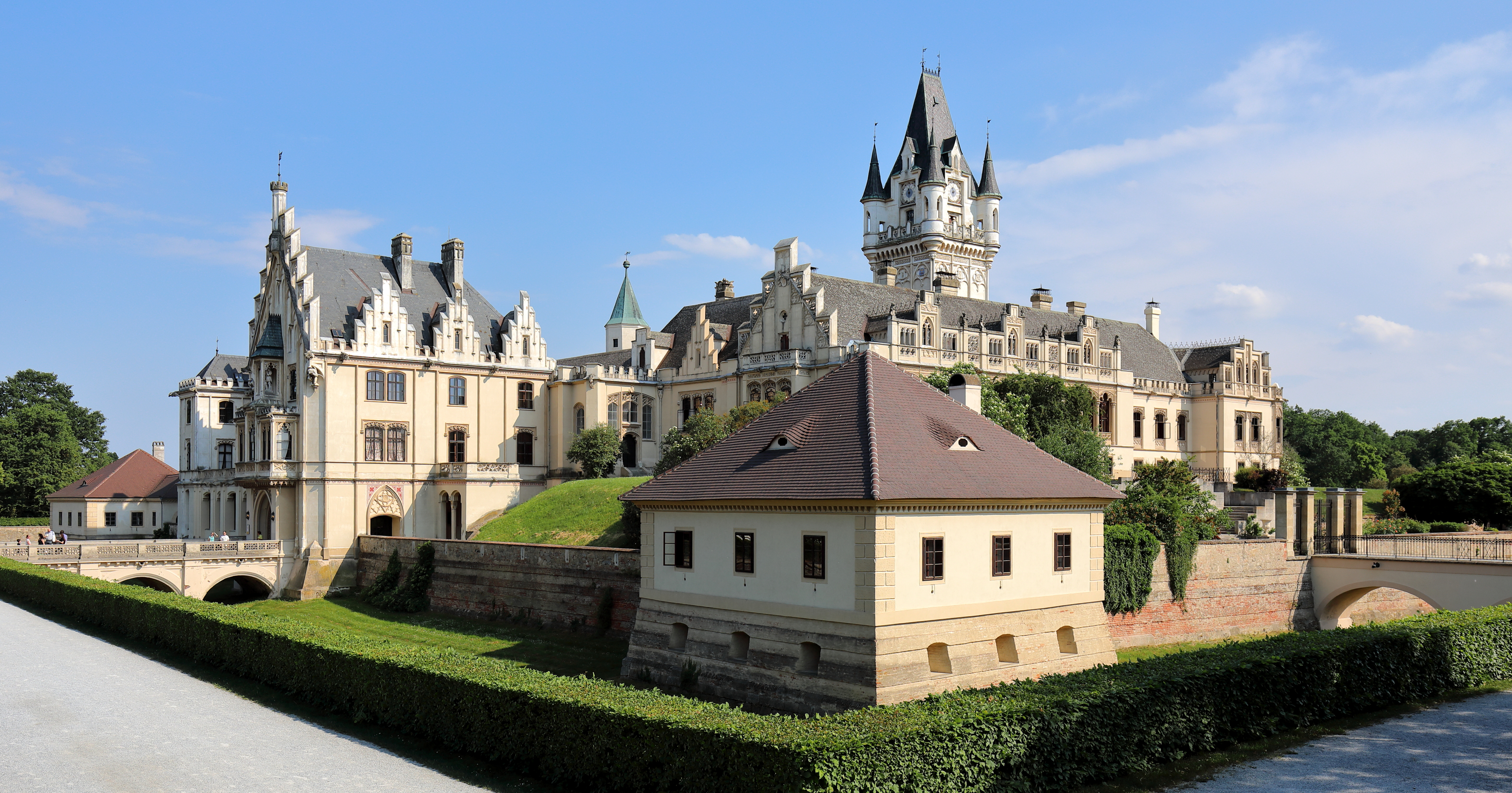
North western view of the castle

Most of the stately rooms in Schloss Grafenegg can be visited. Since 1971, various events such as exhibitions, concerts, conferences have taken place at the castle. Each year there is a Christmas market (the 'Grafenegger Advent'). Between 1984 and 1987, the castle was the setting for a Lower Austrian state exhibition on the age of emperor Franz Joseph I of Austria. The initiator and driver of the cultural activities on the castle grounds was its managing director Gerhard Großberger. He made Schloss Grafenegg a fixed point in Austria's cultural landscape. In addition, there are on the castle grounds a riding school, a hotel, a restaurant and a vinotheque.

In the park, there are the open-air stage 'Wolkenturm' with 1750 seats, completed in 2007, and the Auditorium Grafenegg concert hall, which serves as a venue and alternative location for the open air stage. Both are used for the Grafenegg Festival under artistic direction of Rudolf Buchbinder, which takes place every year (since 2007). The park and gardens are also used Lower Austrian State Horticultural Show.

Further, the castle has been used in various (German spoken) movies and series.

== Literature ==
- Georg Binder: Die Niederösterreichischen Burgen und Schlösser. 2 Bände, Wien/Leipzig 1925, II, S. 48 ff.
- Bertrand Michael Buchmann, Brigitte Fassbinder: Burgen und Schlösser zwischen Gföhl, Ottenstein und Grafenegg. Burgen und Schlösser in Niederösterreich. Band 17, Birken-Reihe, St. Pölten/Wien 1990, 65 ff.
- Rudolf Büttner: Burgen und Schlösser an der Donau. Birkenverlag, Wien 1977, S. 157 ff.
- Werner Kitlitschka: Schloß Grafenegg. Schlossführer, undatiert (erhältlich im Schloss).
- Falko Daim, Karin und Thomas Kühtreiber (Hrsg.): Burgen Waldviertel – Wachau – Mährisches Thayatal. 2. Auflage, Verlag Freytag & Berndt, Wien 2009, ISBN 978-3-7079-1273-9, S. 125 ff.
- Klaus Eggert: Zur Baugeschichte von Grafenegg im 19. Jahrhundert. In: Das Zeitalter Franz Josephs. Ausstellungskatalog. 1. Teil: Von der Revolution zur Gründerzeit, 1848–1880. 1984, S. 511–521.
- Willi Erasmus: Burgen, Stifte und Schlösser der Regionen Waldviertel, Donauraum, Südböhmen, Vysočina, Südmähren. Zwettl 2007, ISBN 978-3-9502262-2-5, S. 39 ff.
- Martina Lorenz, Karl Portele: Burgen Schlösser Österreich. Wien 1997, S. 48.
- Laurin Luchner: Schlösser in Österreich I. München 1978, S. 146 f.
- Georg Clam-Martinic: Österreichisches Burgenlexikon. Linz 1992, S. 126 (online bei Austria-Forum).
- Gerhard Reichhalter, Karin und Thomas Kühtreiber: Burgen Waldviertel Wachau. St. Pölten 2001, S. 99 ff.
- Hans Tietze: Die Sammlungen des Schlosses Grafenegg. Österreichische Kunsttopographie Beiheft zu Band I, Wien 1908.
