= Stella Doufexis =

German mezzo-soprano

- Στέλλα Ντουφεξή
- Born: 15 April 1968; Frankfurt, West Germany
- Died: 15 December 2015 (aged 47); Berlin, Germany
- Occupation: Opera singer
- Spouse: Christian Jost
- Musical career
- Genres: Opera
- Website: stelladoufexis.de

Stella Doufexis (15 April 1968 – 15 December 2015) was a German mezzo-soprano in opera and concert.

She was married to the German composer and musician Christian Jost. She died of cancer at age 47.
