= Roderick Cox (conductor) =

German based American conductor

Roderick Cox (born 1987) is an American conductor.

== Biography ==
Cox was born in Macon, Georgia. He attended the Schwob School of Music at Columbus State University, then graduated from Northwestern University with a master's degree in conducting in 2011. At Northwestern, he studied conducting with Victor Yampolsky and Mallory Thompson. He then studied with Robert Spano at the American Academy of Conducting in Aspen, Colorado in 2013–2014. Cox conducted the Northwestern University's various classical ensembles, including the university's symphony orchestra. He was an assistant conductor with the Alabama Symphony Orchestra after graduating from Northwestern University. He became the music director and principal conductor of the Alabama Symphony Youth Orchestra in 2012. He won the Robert J. Harth Conducting Prize in 2013.

In 2015, Cox began working as assistant conductor in the Minnesota Orchestra, followed by the position of associate conductor in 2016. He debuted his subscription concert series with the orchestra in January 2017. He left the Minnesota Orchestra in 2018, and relocated to Berlin, Germany. In 2018, Cox was the recipient of the Sir Georg Solti Conducting Award. He launched the Roderick Cox Music Initiative (RCMI) in 2019, which provides scholarships for young musicians from historically marginalized communities, allowing them to pay for instruments, music lessons and summer camps. Cox and his initiative were featured in the documentary Conducting Life.

In 2021, Cox made his first guest-conducting appearance with the Opéra Orchestre national Montpellier. In April 2024, the Opéra Orchestre national Montpellier announced the appointment of Cox as its next music director, effective September 2024. This appointment marks Cox's first music directorship.

Cultural offices
Preceded by Michael Schønwandt	Music Director, Opéra Orchestre national Montpellier Occitanie; 2024–present	Succeeded by incumbent
