= Grafenegg Festival =

Classical music festival in Austria

Coordinates: 48°25′43″N 15°44′46″E

- Genre: classical music
- Dates: August, September
- Location(s): Grafenegg
- Years active: 2007–present
- Website: www.grafenegg.com

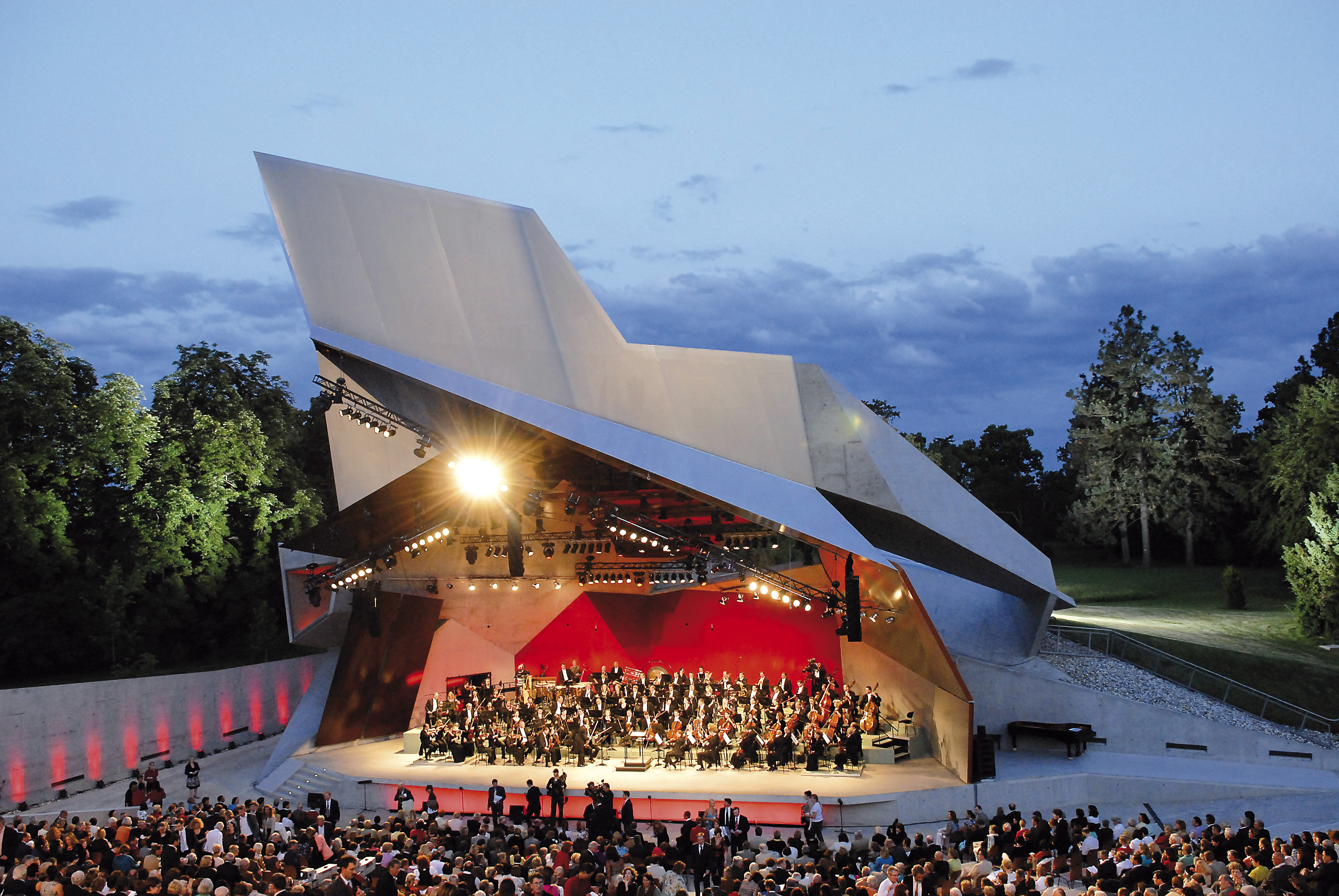
The open-air stage "Wolkenturm"

The Grafenegg Festival is a major international classical music festival in Grafenegg, close to Vienna, Austria. The annual festival takes place on the grounds of Schloss Grafenegg. Two venues have been built particularly for the festival in the park of the castle: The open-air stage Wolkenturm (capacity 2,000 in total, opened 2007) as well as the new concert hall Auditorium (capacity 1,372, opened 2008).

The artistic director is pianist Rudolf Buchbinder. The festival's program consists of symphonic and chamber music as well as recitals. International guest orchestras are performing as well as the Austrian Tonkünstler Orchestra, which serves as orchestra in residence. The first festival started on 23 August 2007 and lasted until 9 September 2007.

== Composer in Residence ==
The festival also serves as the major introduction of the annual Grafenegg composer in residence. During the festivities the composer in residence presents various newly commissioned works and holds exclusive workshops for young composers and conductors.

Grafenegg Composers in Residence:

- Krzysztof Penderecki (2007)
- Heinz Holliger (2008)
- Tan Dun (2009)
- Cristóbal Halffter (2010)
- Heinz Karl Gruber (2011)
- James MacMillan (2012)
- Brett Dean (2013)
- Jörg Widmann (2014)
- Matthias Pintscher (2015)
- Christian Jost (2016)
- Brad Lubman (2017)
- Ryan Wigglesworth (2018)
- Peter Ruzicka (2019)
- Konstantia Gourzi (2020)
- Toshio Hosokawa (2021)
- Georg Friedrich Haas (2022)
- Philippe Manoury (2023)
- Enno Poppe (2024)
- Fabián Panisello (2025)
