= Grafenegg =

- Municipality
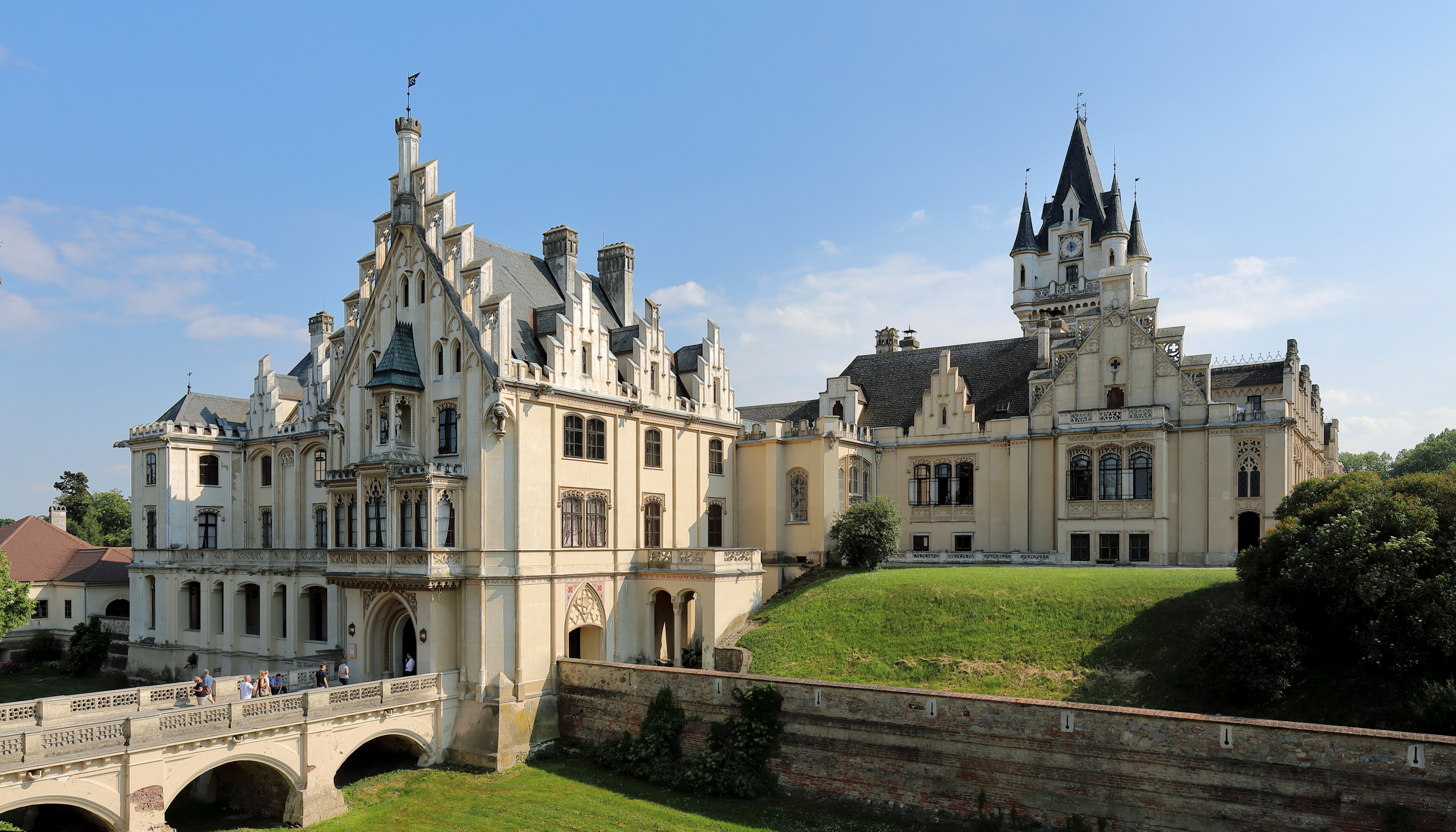
- Grafenegg Castle

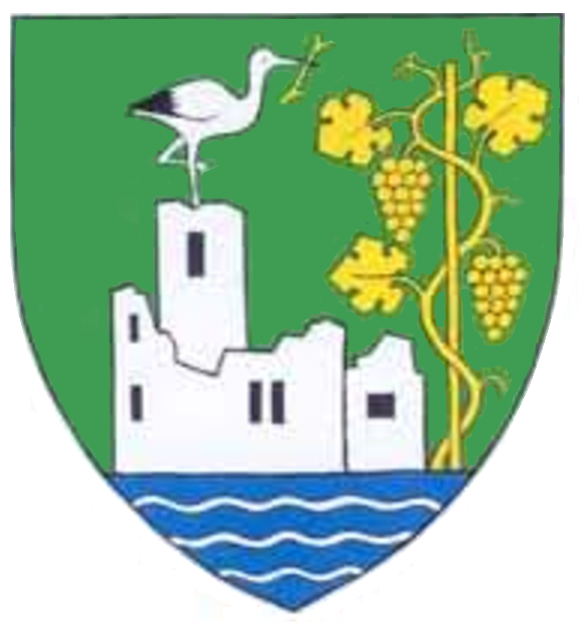
- Coat of arms

- Location within Austria
- Coordinates: 48°26′N 15°45′E
- Country: Austria
- State: Lower Austria
- District: Krems-Land

Government
  - Mayor: Manfred Denk (ÖVP)

Area
  - Total: 28.53 km^{2} (11.02 sq mi)
- Elevation: 197 m (646 ft)

Population (2024)
  - Total: 3,216
  - Density: 112.7/km^{2} (292.0/sq mi)
- Time zone: UTC+1 (CET)
  - Summer (DST): UTC+2 (CEST)
- Postal code: 3492
- Area code: 02735
- Website: https://www.grafenegg.gv.at/

Grafenegg is a market town (Municipality) in the Krems-Land district of Lower Austria, Austria.

== History ==
Originally called Etsdorf-Haitzendorf, it changed its name in 2003.

== Population ==
Historical population
Year	Pop.	±%
1971	2,713	—
1981	2,621	−3.4%
1991	2,687	+2.5%
2001	2,830	+5.3%
2011	2,982	+5.4%
2021	3,216	+7.8%

== Sights ==
Grafenegg is renowned for Schloss Grafenegg, owned by the Duke of Ratibor, Prince of Corvey of the House of Hohenlohe. The castle grounds are the site of the Grafenegg Music Festival and sculpture garden.
