= René Koering =

French composer and film producer

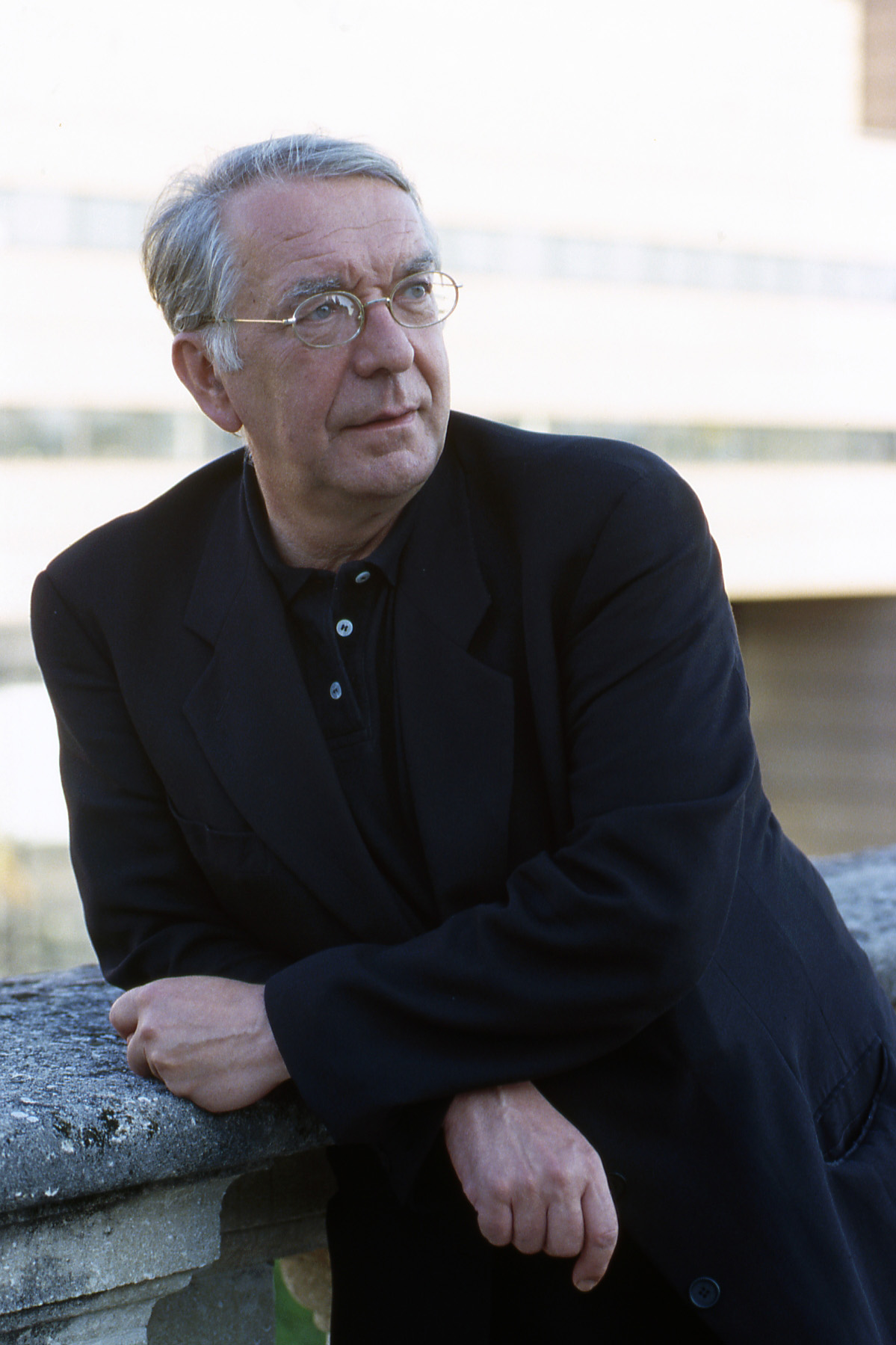
René Koering

René Koering (born 27 May 1940) is a French composer, film producer and theater director. He is particularly known for his involvement in the creation of the Festival de Radio France et Montpellier in 1985.

== Life ==
Born in Andlau (Bas-Rhin), he participated to the establishment of the Festival de Radio France et Montpellier in 1985. He is the father of the French actress and director Ophélie Koering.

== Awards ==
- 1967: Prize of the Bleustein-Blanchet Foundation.
- 1967: Grand prix of the Fondation Maeght.
- 1978: Grand prix of the musique symphonique of the SACEM.
- 1990: Grand prix Musique of the Société des auteurs et compositeurs dramatiques.
- 1998: Chevalier de l'ordre de la Légion d'honneur, proposed by the Ministère de la culture et de la communication.
- 2002: Grand Prix Antoine Livio of the Presse musicale internationale.
- 2005: Commandeur des Arts et des Lettres.
- Chevalier de l'Ordre national du Mérite.
