= Festival Radio France Occitanie Montpellier =

The Festival Radio France Occitanie Montpellier, formerly the Festival de Radio France et de Montpellier, is a summer festival of opera and music held in Montpellier, France created in 1985. The music festival concentrates on classical music and jazz with about 100 events, including opera, concerts, films, and talks, most of which are free and located in the historic courtyards of the city or the modern concert halls of Le Corum.

Since its beginning, the festival has been entrusted to René Koering. Jean-Noël Jeanneney, president and general manager of Radio France in 1985 declared the purpose the festival was to reconcile "the classic and the unexpected, great interpreters and musicians making their debut, ancient accents and the sonorities of tomorrow... in the great tradition of public service".

The Festival is held for more than two weeks in mid to late July.

== Significant premieres ==
- 2006 premiere Édouard Lalo's lost opera Fiesque. With Roberto Alagna, cond. Alain Altinoglu - DG, 2011
- First performance in modern times of Louise Bertin's Esmeralda, cond. Lawrence Foster.
- 2008 Ildebrando Pizzetti Fedra, cond. Enrique Mazzola
- 2010 Vincent d'Indy L'Étranger, cond. Lawrence Foster (incl. world premiere recording)

== Publications, DVDs and CDs ==
The Festival licenses, under its Euterp label, notable visual and audio recordings to Accord, the French arm of Universal Classics.

== See also ==
- List of opera festivals
