= List of youth orchestras in the United States =

This is a list of youth orchestras in the United States.

Youth orchestras are performing groups for student musicians. The age range of participants varies; they may include musicians up to grade 12 or they may include older university and conservatory students. In the United States, youth orchestras are operated primarily for music education. Some are associated with professional symphony orchestras. Professional symphony orchestras have multiple motivations for sponsoring youth orchestras, including training of young musicians and building future audiences by engaging children with classical music. A 2006–7 survey of youth orchestras by the League of American Orchestras found that 75% of the participating orchestral groups were independent, about 19% were affiliated with adult orchestras, and about 3% were associated with educational institutions.

The first and oldest U.S. youth orchestra is the Portland Youth Philharmonic, founded in 1924 as the Portland Junior Symphony Association. Russian émigré Jacques Gershkovitch was the Portland group's first conductor. It was followed in 1935 by the Young People's Symphony Orchestra in Berkeley, California, which describes itself as the second oldest independent youth symphony in the country. By 1963, Life magazine counted about 15,000 youth orchestras in the country and noted that they were producing music of a caliber that could appeal to adult audiences.

The USA was slow to create a national youth orchestra. One existed, from 1940 to 1942, established and led by Leopold Stokowski and consisting of instrumental musicians between the ages of 18 and 25. Stokowski personally auditioned many of the 15,000 young musicians who applied to become members of the All-American Youth Orchestra. The orchestra he assembled consisted of about 100 musicians, one-fifth of whom were women. A small number of professional musicians from the Philadelphia Orchestra played with the younger musicians. The All-American Youth Orchestra made several recordings and toured in Latin America as well as the United States during its two years of existence before being disbanded due to the exigencies imposed by U.S. involvement in World War II.

In 2012 the Weill Music Institute of Carnegie Hall launched the National Youth Orchestra of the United States of America (NYO-USA). By March 2013, the names of the 120 musicians chosen by were announced and the orchestra toured Washington, Moscow, St Petersburg and London in July 2013. The National Youth Orchestra continues to operate as of 2022.

Adult symphony orchestras in the United States are in a separate list of symphony orchestras in the United States.

== National ==
- National Youth Orchestra of the United States of America
- Orchestra America

== California ==
- American Youth Symphony
- California Youth Symphony
- Los Angeles Junior Philharmonic Orchestra
- Pacific Symphony Youth Orchestra
- Palo Alto Chamber Orchestra
- Sacramento Youth Symphony
- San Francisco Symphony Youth Orchestra
- San Jose Youth Symphony
- Winds Across the Bay
- Young People's Symphony Orchestra

== Colorado ==
- Denver Young Artists Orchestra

== Connecticut ==
- Western Connecticut Youth Orchestra
- Norwalk Youth Symphony

== Florida ==
- Florida Symphony Youth Orchestras
- Florida Young Artists Orchestra
- Florida Youth Orchestra
- Jacksonville Symphony Youth Orchestra
- Metropolitan Area Youth Symphony

== Georgia ==
- Atlanta Symphony Youth Orchestra
- Georgia Youth Symphony Orchestra

== Hawaii ==
- Hawaii Youth Symphony

== Illinois ==
- Chicago Youth Symphony Orchestras
- Elgin Youth Symphony Orchestra
- Midwest Young Artists Conservatory

== Indiana ==
- Indianapolis Youth Orchestra

== Kentucky ==
- Louisville Youth Orchestra

== Maryland ==
- Gamer Symphony Orchestra at the University of Maryland
- Maryland Classic Youth Orchestras

== Massachusetts ==
- Boston Youth Symphony Orchestras
- Boston Philharmonic Youth Orchestra
- New England Conservatory Youth Philharmonic Orchestra

== Minnesota ==
- Minnesota Youth Symphonies
- Mankato Area Youth Symphony Orchestra
- Greater Twin Cities Youth Symphonies

== Missouri ==
- Saint Louis Symphony Youth Orchestra

== Nevada ==
- The Young Artists Orchestra of Las Vegas

== New Jersey ==
- New Jersey State Youth Orchestra
- New Jersey Youth Symphony

== New Mexico ==
- Albuquerque Youth Symphony

== New York ==
- The Children's Orchestra Society
- Empire State Youth Orchestra
- InterSchool Orchestras of New York
- New York Youth Symphony
- National Youth Orchestra of the United States of America

== Ohio ==
- Akron Youth Symphony
- Cleveland Orchestra Youth Orchestra
- Contemporary Youth Orchestra

== Oklahoma ==
- Tulsa Youth Symphony

== Oregon ==
- Eugene-Springfield Youth Orchestras
- Metropolitan Youth Symphony
- Portland Youth Philharmonic

== Pennsylvania ==
- Philadelphia Youth Orchestra
- Pittsburgh Youth Symphony Orchestra
- Reading Symphony Youth Orchestra

== Texas ==
- Greater Dallas Youth Orchestra
- Youth Orchestras of San Antonio

== Utah ==
- Lyceum Philharmonic at American Heritage School

== Virginia ==
- American Youth Philharmonic Orchestras
- Richmond Symphony Youth Orchestra

== Washington ==
- Seattle Youth Symphony Orchestras

== Wisconsin ==
- Milwaukee Youth Symphony Orchestra
- Wisconsin Youth Symphony Orchestras

== Washington, D.C. ==
- DC Youth Orchestra Program
