= Marcelo Bratke =

Brazilian pianist

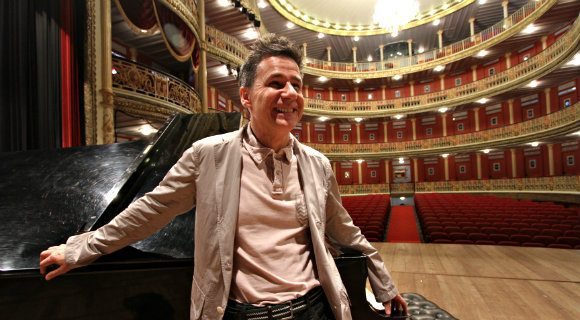
Marcelo Bratke

Marcelo Bratke (born September 6, 1960) is a Brazilian pianist.

== Career ==
Bratke began his piano studies at the age of 14 with Zélia Deri.

Two years later he debuted with the São Paulo State Symphony Orchestra (OSESP) under the baton of conductor Eleazar de Carvalho, receiving the Revelation Pianist Award from the APCA (São Paulo State Association of Art Critics).

He made his European debut at the Salzburg Festival in 1988 and has since performed regularly in concert halls in Brazil and abroad, such as Sala São Paulo in Brazil, Wigmore Hall in London, Suntory Hall in Tokyo, the Kozerthaus Berlin and Carnegie Hall in New York, among others.

Bratke has performed alongside conductors such as Alexander Lazarev, Isaac Karabtchevsky, Álvaro Cassuto, Eleazar de Carvalho, John Neschling, Roberto Minczuk, João Carlos Martins, among others. Also, he participated in crossover projects with Julian Joseph, Naná Vasconcelos, Thiago Soares, Marco Gambino, Milton Nascimento, Dori Caymmi, Fernanda Takai and Sandy.

In 2008, Marcelo Bratke founded the “Camerata Brasil”, an orchestra of young musicians from underprivileged areas of Brazilian society. They performed around 300 concerts in Brazil, Argentina, Japan, the United Kingdom, Serbia, South Korea, the Netherlands and the United States, where they performed in a concert which honored Heitor Villa-Lobos at Carnegie Hall in New York.

In partnership with the visual artist Mariannita Luzzati, he created the project “Cinemúsica”, conceived to be presented in Brazilian prisons and later taken to concert halls in Europe, Brazil and the United States.

In 2004, Bratke developed the Villa-Lobos Worldwide Project, which promotes the composer through actions which included the recording of his complete work for solo piano in partnership with the British music label Quartz Music, concerts in Brazil and abroad and radio/television shows.

As a radio and television host, Marcelo Bratke created and hosts since 2015 the weekly program “Alma Brasileira” (Brazilian Soul) on the Brazilian radio station Cultura FM. In 2017, he directed and hosted the 8 episode TV documentary series about Heitor Villa-Lobos entitled “O Tempo e Música - Villa-Lobos” for Arte 1 TV channel. In 2020 he created a series of 20 classical music vignettes for Bandeirantes TV channel and in 2021 he directed and hosted a series of documentaries for Arte 1 channel named “Música no meu Jardim” (Music in my Garden) about Bach, Mozart, Beethoven and Chopin.

In 2017, Marcelo Bratke received the Order of Cultural Merit (title: Commander) granted by the President of the Republic of Brazil Michel Temer and the Ministry of Culture for his project dedicated to Heitor Villa-Lobos.

== Awards ==
- 1976 – Revelation Award – APCA – São Paulo State Association of Art Critics (Brazil)
- 1985 – 1st Prize Concorso Internazionale di Musica Città di Tradate (Italy)
- 2002 - Carlos Gomes Award (Brazil)
- 2011 - 14º Brazilian International Press Award (The United Kingdom)
- 2013 - Touch of Art Award - International Festival Sarajevo (Bosnia and Herzegovina)
- 2017 - Order of Cultural Merit (Brazil)
- 2018 – Cidadão São Paulo Award (Brazil)
