= Wisconsin Youth Symphony Orchestras =

Music education organization in Madison, US

- Youth orchestra
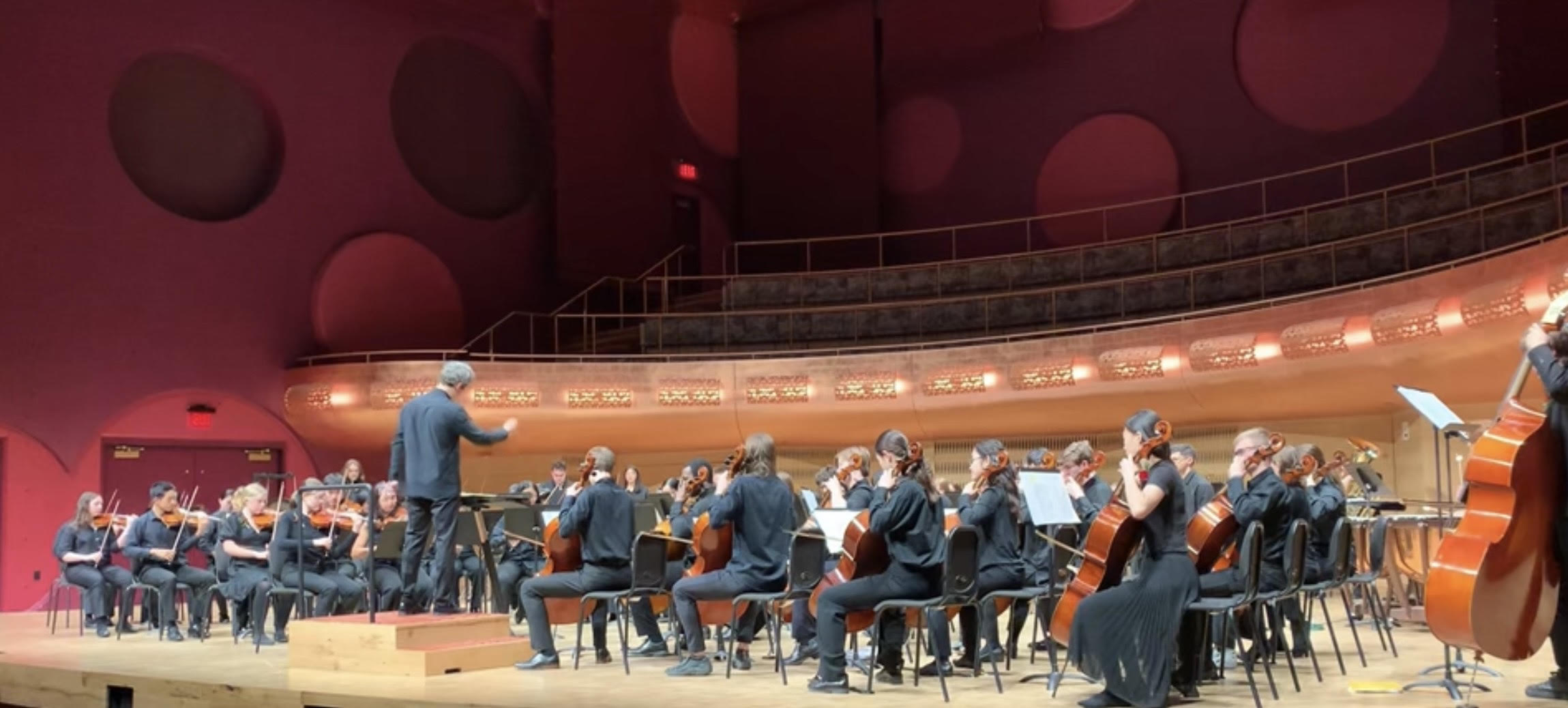
- A Youth Orchestra performance at Hamel Music Center.
- Short name: WYSO
- Founded: 1966
- Location: Madison, Wisconsin
- Music director: Kyle Knox
- Website: wysomusic.org
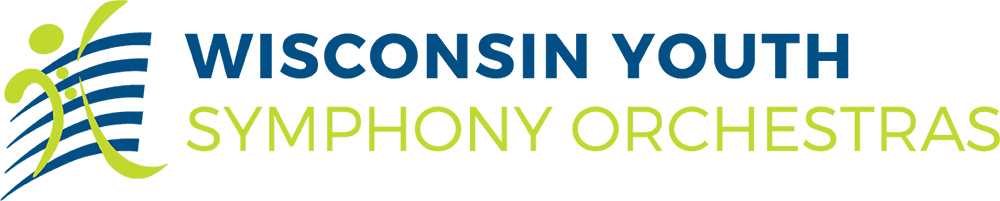

Wisconsin Youth Symphony Orchestras (WYSO) is a music education and youth orchestra organization in Madison, Wisconsin. It comprises five orchestras, several instrumental ensembles, a chamber music program, and other music programs for youth in southern Wisconsin. Since early 2024, all WYSO ensembles have rehearsed in the WYSO Center for Music.

External videos
- Performances by the WYSO Youth Orchestra
- Prokofiev – Romeo and Juliet
- Rossini – Finale from the Overture to William Tell
- Mussorgsky - Night on Bald Mountain
- Dvořák – Symphony No. 8

== History ==
WYSO was founded in 1966 by Dr. Marvin Rabin, a conductor and music pedagogue at the University of Wisconsin–Madison. Initially part of its Extension Music Department, the organization then only included one youth orchestra. Rabin would conduct the Youth Orchestra for six years, after which David Nelson continued his tenure as director.

In 1977, two more orchestras, philharmonia and concert, were founded. Thomas Buchhauser, a cellist and conductor, was invited to conduct Philharmonia. In 1985, James Smith became the new director of youth orchestra, taking the group on its first international tour to the British Isles in 1989.

In 2013, Buchhauser retired and was succeeded by Michelle Kaebisch. In the year after James Smith's retirement in 2017, Randal Swiggum, the director of the Elgin Youth Symphony Orchestra in Illinois, stepped in as the interim music director of WYSO. In July 2018, conductor and clarinetist Kyle Knox began his position as the organization's new music director. In 2025, Michelle Kaebisch assumed the position of WYSO executive director after Bridget Fraser stepped down.

== Programs ==
=== Orchestras ===
- Opus One, a string orchestra for young WYSO members at the beginner level of playing their musical instruments. Directed by Steve Kurr.
- Sinfonietta, a string orchestra of about 65 players that plays music at the middle school level and goes on an in-state tour every year. Directed by Geri Nolden.
- Concert, an orchestra of 80–90 players that plays music at the high school level and goes on an in-state tour every year. Directed by Christine Mata Eckel.
- Philharmonia, an orchestra of 80–90 players that plays at the advanced high school to college level and goes on an in-state tour every year. Directed by Michelle Kaebisch.
- Youth, an orchestra of 80–100 players that plays at the college level and tours internationally every two years in addition to a yearly in-state tour. Directed by Kyle Knox.

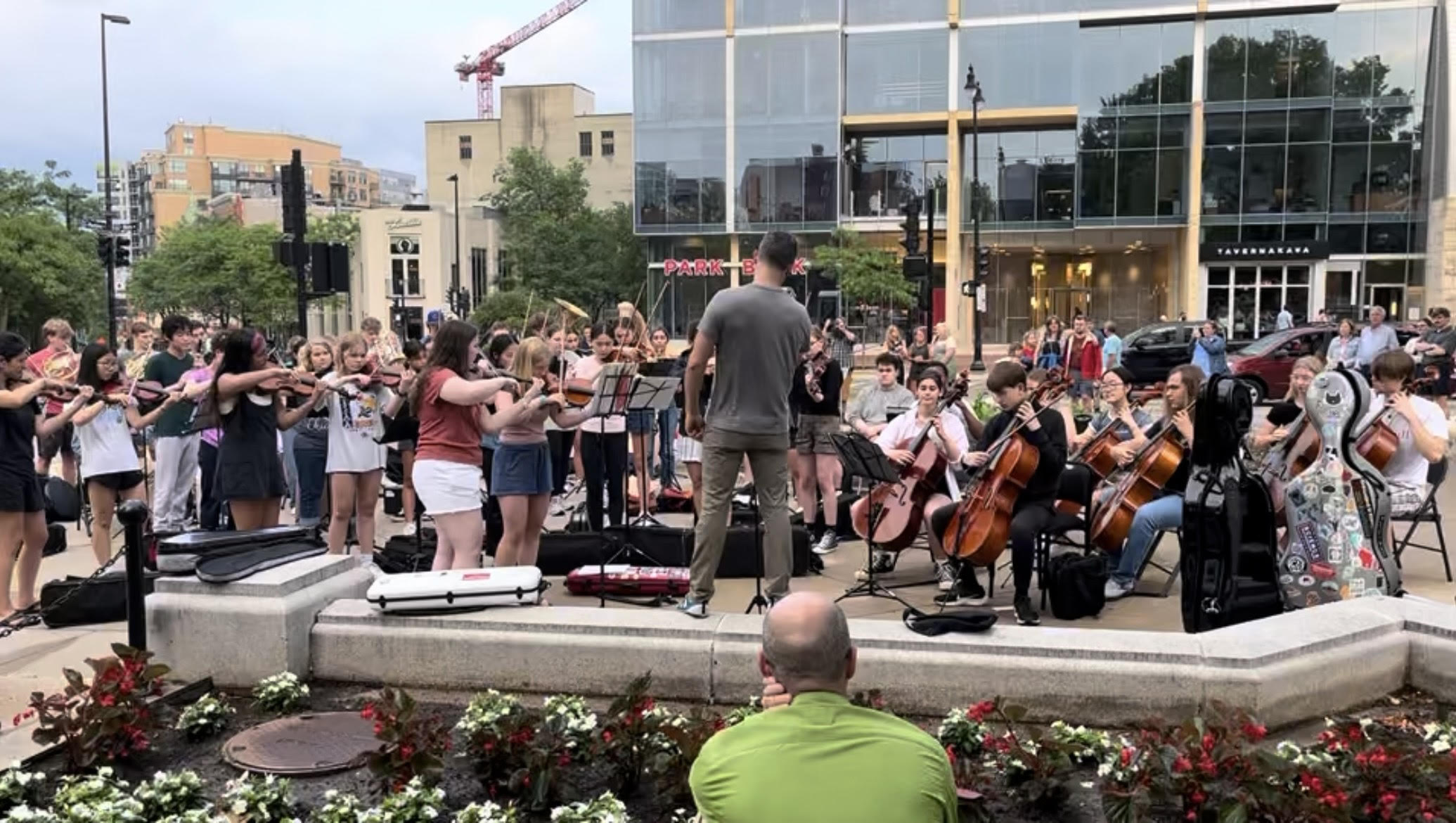
The WYSO Youth Orchestra gives a flash mob performance of Ravel's Boléro at Capitol Square.

=== Ensembles ===
- The Brass Choirs, a set of brass ensembles for WYSO members in the upper three orchestras that focuses only on brass repertoire. Directed by Josh Biere.
- The Flute Choir, a flute ensemble for WYSO and non-WYSO flutists that plays flute music from a variety of genres.
- The Percussion Ensemble, a required ensemble for all WYSO percussionists. Directed by Vicki Peterson Jenks.
- The Harp Ensemble, an ensemble for WYSO harpists focusing on solo, chamber, and orchestral music training. Directed by Jenny DeRoche Christian.

=== Chamber music ===
The WYSO chamber music program is directed by Karl Lavine, and consists of a number of student chamber music groups. These groups are coached by WYSO artistic staff. Two permanent chamber groups are:

- The Lalita Honors Woodwind Quintet, a group of five woodwind players (flute, oboe, clarinet, bassoon, horn) that performs several recitals a year, is coached by professionals, and has the opportunity to collaborate with guest artists.
- The Pondrom Honors String Quartet, a group of four string players (two violins, viola, cello) that performs several recitals a year, is coached by professional chamber musicians, has the opportunity to perform on Wisconsin Public Radio (WPR), and participates in chamber music competitions.

=== Music Makers ===
Founded in 2007, Music Makers is an instrumental music education program within WYSO for underserved students. More than 100 WYSO members participate in it, learning string instruments, guitar, percussion, and music theory. Two recitals are held every year.

== Concert series ==
Each of the five WYSO orchestras gives three concerts a year. These concert series also often include performances by the smaller ensembles.

WYSO Concert Series
Concert	Month	Location
Evelyn Steenbock Fall Concert Series	November	varies
Diane Ballweg Winterfest Concert Series	March	varies
Eugenie Mayer Bolz Family Spring Concert Series	May	Hamel Music Center

Recent Youth Orchestra Notable Repertoire
Year	Concert	Piece
2026	Fall	Rimsky-Korsakov - Scheherazade
2026	Spring	Shostakovich - Symphony No. 9
2026	Winter	Mussorgsky/Ravel - Pictures at an Exhibition
2025	Fall	Stravinsky - Suite from The Firebird
2025	Spring	Vaughan Williams - A London Symphony
2025	Winter	Gershwin - An American in Paris
2024	Fall	Tchaikovsky - Symphony No. 4 in F minor
2024	Spring	Mahler - Symphony No. 1 "Titan"
2024	Winter	Rachmaninoff - Symphonic Dances
2023	Spring	Shostakovich - Symphony No. 5

== Rehearsal space ==
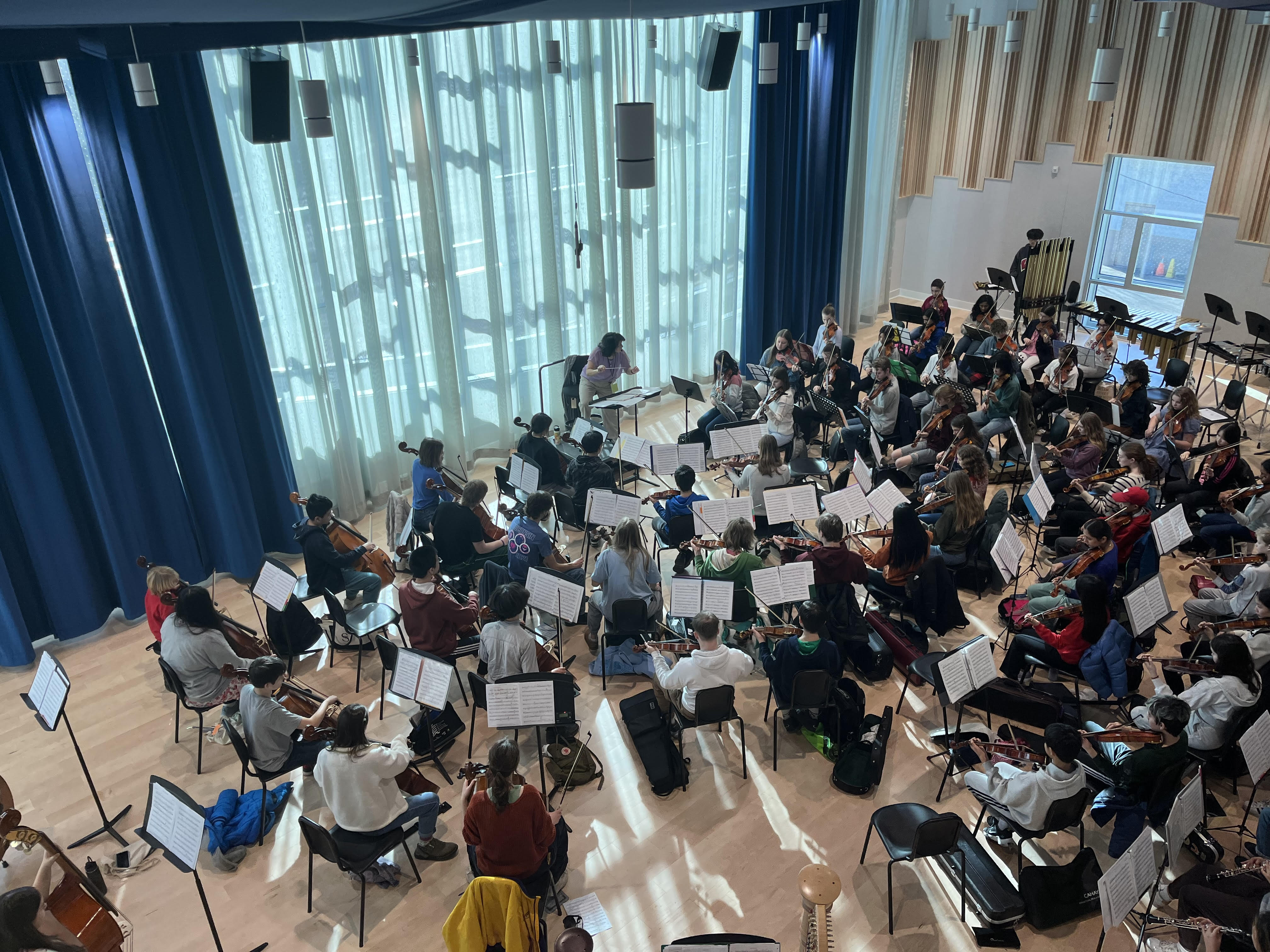
WYSO's Concert Orchestra rehearses in the new WYSO Center for Music in February 2024.

The WYSO orchestras originally rehearsed in a large space in the University of Wisconsin–Madison's George L. Mosse Humanities Building. However, in 2019, the university could no longer support WYSO's rehearsals in that location. The orchestra planned for rehearsals would to be held at McFarland High School going forward, but the COVID-19 pandemic and school closures made this impossible.

Between 2020 and 2024, WYSO ensembles rehearsed in a variety of locations, including the Madison Country Day School cafeteria, classrooms, and under an outdoor tent. In 2021, the organization began plans for a new WYSO building on East Washington Avenue, near the location of Madison's Youth Arts building. In late 2021, a plan for the building was released, featuring a glass design inspired by the shape of a sideways-laying cello.

By January 2024, the new WYSO Center for Music opened and all of WYSO's ensembles moved in. The 40,085 square foot building includes three orchestra rehearsal halls, eight studios, nine individual instrument practice rooms, office space, a music library, as well as a lobby and meeting spaces.

== International tours ==
WYSO's Youth Orchestra has historically toured internationally every two years. During the summer between rehearsal seasons, the group travels for 1–2 weeks, playing 3–4 concerts in various cities and venues.

Youth Orchestra International Tours
Year	Country	Venues	Conductor	Repertoire
1989	United Kingdom		James Smith	
1992	Japan, Taiwan		James Smith	
1995	France, Spain		James Smith	
1998	Japan		James Smith	
2000	Canada		James Smith	
2005	Czech Republic, Austria, Hungary		James Smith	
2012	Czech Republic, Austria, Hungary	Budapest Military Museum; Musikverein, Vienna; Archbishop's Palace, Prague; Czech Museum of Music, Prague	James Smith	Vaughan Williams - A London Symphony; Lalo - Overture to Le Roi d'Ys; Dvořák - Slavonic Dance No. 8; Britten - The Courtly Dances from Gloriana
2014	Argentina	University of Buenos Aires; Teatro Cólon, Mar del Plata; Usina del Arte, Buenos Aires; Teatro El Círculo, Rosario	James Smith	Bernstein - Overture to Candide; Copland - Billy the Kid Suite; Tchaikovsky - Symphony No. 4 in F minor; Ginastera - Malambo from Estancia Suite; Liturgical Scenes by Dwayne S. Milburn
2016	Italy	Piazza del Duomo, Cremona; Verona, Italy; Montecatini Terme, Italy; Rome, Italy	James Smith	Liszt - Hungarian Rhapsody No. 2; Tchaikovsky - Violin Concerto; Kinney - A Radiant Spirit (commission)
2018	Peru	Colegio San Agustín (Lima); Cusco Cathedral; San Juan Bautista Church, Huaro; Teatro Municipal de Puno	James Smith	Bernstein - Overture to West Side Story; Iturriaga - Obertura para una comedia; Arnold - Little Suite No. 2; Shostakovich - Symphony No. 9
2025	Portugal, Spain	Lisbon Academy of Sciences; Pedro Muñoz Seca Municipal Theater; Plaza de las Pasiegas, Granada, Spain; Huétor Vega, Spain	Kyle Knox	Vaughan Williams - A London Symphony; Gershwin - An American in Paris; Lecuona - Malagueña from Andalucía Suite (arr. Grofé)

== Notable alumni ==
- Kenneth Woods, music director of English Symphony Orchestra
- Scott Pingel, principal bassist of San Francisco Symphony Orchestra
- Nancy Goeres, principal bassoonist of Pittsburgh Symphony Orchestra
- Andrew Balio, principal trumpet of Baltimore Symphony Orchestra
- Ansel Norris, trumpet player and International Tchaikovsky Competition prizewinner
- John Zirbel, principal horn of the Montreal Symphony Orchestra and International Horn Society Punto Award recipient

== See also ==
- List of youth orchestras in the United States
- Milwaukee Youth Symphony Orchestra
- Wisconsin Chamber Orchestra
- Madison Symphony Orchestra
