= Jobim Sinfônico =

2003 live symphonic album

Live album by Orquestra Sinfônica do Estado de São Paulo
- Released: 2003
- Recorded: 9 and 11 December 2002
- Venue: Sala São Paulo, São Paulo, São Paulo, Brazil
- Genre: Classical; Orchestral; MPB
- Length: 1:39:00
- Label: Biscoito Fino
- Producer: Mariza Adnet; Ruby Nüñez

Jobim Sinfônico is an album recorded by the São Paulo State Symphony Orchestra (Osesp) under the baton of Roberto Minczuk and released in 2003 by the Biscoito Fino label.

== Background ==
The recording of the album Jobim Sinfônico, made at Sala São Paulo in São Paulo on December 9 and 11, 2002, features a performance by the São Paulo State Symphony Orchestra (Osesp) paying tribute to the work of composer Antônio Carlos Jobim, conducted by Roberto Minczuk.

To blend Tom's work with the formal style of orchestras, guitarists Mario Adnet and Paulo Jobim adapted seventeen of Jobim's compositions into symphonic concertos to be performed by Osesp. The concert featured seventy musicians. The performance also included a guest appearance by musician Milton Nascimento.

== Tracks ==
No.	Title	Writer(s)	Participations/Notes	Length
1.	"O Planalto Deserto"	Tom Jobim / Vinícius de Moraes	instrumental	02:58
2.	"O Homem"	Tom Jobim / Vinícius de Moraes	instrumental	02:31
3.	"A Chegada dos Candangos"	Tom Jobim / Vinícius de Moraes	instrumental	02:35
4.	"O Trabalho e a Construção"	Tom Jobim / Vinícius de Moraes	instrumental	10:40
5.	"Prelúdio – Orfeu da Conceição"	Tom Jobim	instrumental	01:58
6.	"Overture"	Tom Jobim	instrumental	06:43
7.	"Macumba"	Tom Jobim / Vinícius de Moraes	instrumental	01:35
8.	"Modinha"	Tom Jobim / Vinícius de Moraes	with a symphonic arrangement	04:11
9.	"Se Todos Fossem Iguais a Você"	Tom Jobim / Vinícius de Moraes	featuring Milton Nascimento	04:23
10.	"A Felicidade"	Tom Jobim / Vinícius de Moraes	instrumental	02:11
11.	"Lenda"	Tom Jobim	instrumental	04:23
12.	"Imagina"	Tom Jobim / Chico Buarque	featuring Milton Nascimento	03:52
13.	"Saudade do Brasil"	Tom Jobim	instrumental	08:29
14.	"Matita Perê"	Tom Jobim / Paulo César Pinheiro	featuring Milton Nascimento	07:19
15.	"Canta, Canta Mais"	Tom Jobim / Vinícius de Moraes	instrumental	04:37
16.	"Trem para Cordisburgo"	Tom Jobim	instrumental	01:15
17.	"Chora Coração"	Tom Jobim / Vinícius de Moraes	instrumental	03:25
18.	"O Jardim Abandonado"	Tom Jobim	instrumental	02:05
19.	"Milagre e Palhaços"	Tom Jobim	instrumental	03:50
20.	"Bangzália"	Tom Jobim	instrumental	04:24
21.	"Meu Amigo Radamés"	Tom Jobim	instrumental	03:41
22.	"Gabriela"	Tom Jobim	instrumental	06:43
23.	"Garota de Ipanema"	Tom Jobim / Vinícius de Moraes	instrumental	05:11
Total length:				01:39:00

== Release ==
The album was released on CD by the Rio de Janeiro-based label Biscoito Fino. A double-DVD edition was also released, also by Biscoito Fino.

== Reception ==
=== Critics ===
Arthur Nestrovski, writing for the Folha de S. Paulo newspaper, praised the album, noting that "it is clear from this 'Jobim Sinfônico' project that Tom Jobim's artistry, beyond being miraculous, involved a considerable amount of hard work." Gislaine Gutierre, writing for Diário do Grande ABC, also praised the work: "The work is brilliant. Not only because of the beauty of the compositions and their arrangements, which made it possible for the repertoire to be performed by both a symphony orchestra and a band, but also because it brings to life a facet of Tom Jobim's work that had been scattered to the winds. The excellence of the team involved also contributes greatly to the result."

Critic Tárik de Souza, writing for Jornal do Brasil, praised the album, adding, "With Tom Jobim's genius touch, the compositions move freely between popular and chamber music, as the maestro interwove elements of both styles."

=== Prizes ===
In 2004, the album was nominated for a Latin Grammy in the Best Classical Album category. At a ceremony held at the Shrine Auditorium in Las Vegas, United States, the album shared the award with Carmen Symphony by the Barcelona Symphony Orchestra and National Orchestra of Catalonia, conducted by Uruguayan conductor José Serebrier. That same year, the album was nominated in the Best Project Album category at the TIM Music Awards. The album was beaten by João Bosco's Song Book.

Year	Prize	Category	Venue	Result	Ref.
2004	Latin Grammy	Best classic album	Shrine Auditorium, Las Vegas, Nevada, United States	Won	
2004	Prêmio TIM de Música	Best album for special project	Theatro Municipal, Rio de Janeiro, Rio de Janeiro, Brazil	Nominated	

== Personnel ==
Seventy musicians from the São Paulo State Symphony Orchestra (OSESP) were required for the recording of the album. In addition to the OSESP members, the following musicians also participated:

- Benjamim Taubkin: piano
- Marcos Miller: piano
- Zeca Assumpção: bass
- Teco Cardoso: flutes and saxophone
- Nailor Proveta: clarinet and saxophone
- Paulo Guimarães: flutes and saxophone
- Léa Freire: flutes
- Duduka da Fonseca: drums and percussion
- Paulo Jobim: acoustic guitar and vocals
- Mario Adnet: acoustic guitar and vocals
