= José Miguel Wisnik =

Brazilian composer, musician and essayist

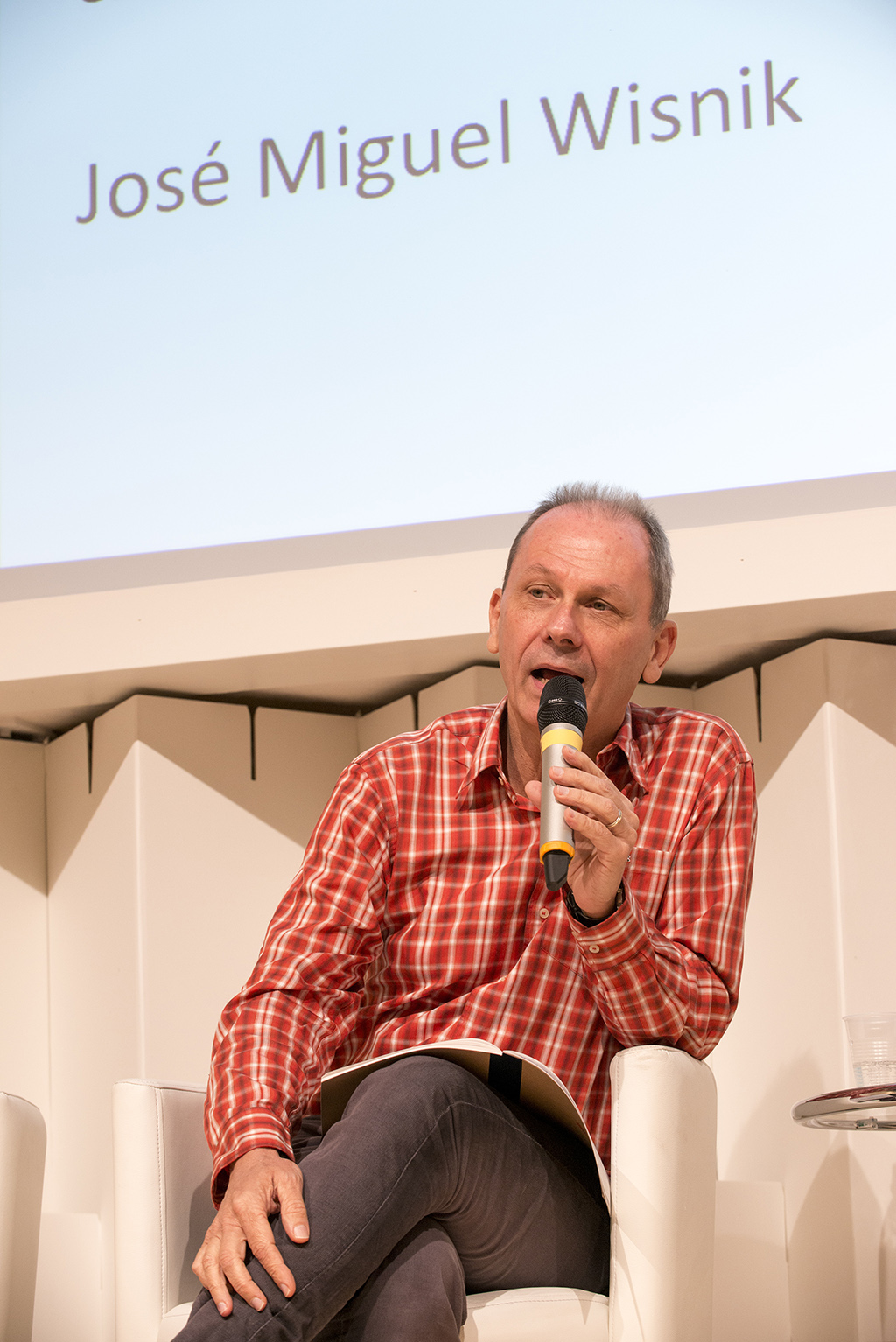
- Wisnik at the Frankfurt Book Fair, 2013.
- Born: October 27, 1948 (age 77); São Vicente, São Paulo, Brazil
- Other name: Zé Miguel Wisnik
- Education: University of São Paulo
- Occupations: Composer, pianist, essayist, university professor

José Miguel Wisnik (born 27 October 1948) is a Brazilian composer, musician, and essayist. He is a professor of Brazilian Literature at the University of São Paulo. His studies, collected in books and periodicals, are mainly focused on the relationship between literature and music; he also deals with comparative literature.

== Life and work ==
Born in São Vicente, from a family of Polish descent, Wisnik studied the piano at the conservatory in his hometown. He graduated in Languages from the University of São Paulo in 1970 and has also a master's degree (1974) and a doctorate (1980) in literary theory and comparative literature from the same institution.

He performed for the first time as a soloist with the São Paulo Municipal Orchestra at the age of 17, interpreting Camille Saint-Saëns' Concerto nº 2. In 1968, he participated in the University Festival aired by TV Tupi, with his song Outra Viagem, sung by Alaíde Costa and later recorded by Ná Ozzetti.

Wisnik recorded four albums: the eponymous José Miguel Wisnik (1992), São Paulo Rio (2002), which featured singer Elza Soares, with whom Wisnik performed in a few shows in 2002, in addition to taking part in the artistic direction of her album Do Cóccix até o Pescoço, Pérolas aos Poucos (2003), the double CD Indivisível (2011) and Vão (2022)

Wisnik wrote essays on music and literature, among them O coro dos contrários: a música em torno da semana de 22 (1978; awarded the Jabuti Prize for New Author), O Som e o Sentido- Uma outra história das músicas (1989), Sem Receita – Ensaios e Canções (2004), Veneno Remédio (2008), about Brazil's relationship with football, and Machado Maxixe: o Caso Pestana (2008).

In addition to his records, books, essays and classes, Wisnik also makes music for film (Foreign Land, by Walter Salles and Daniela Thomas), stage (As Boas, Hamlet and Mistérios Gozozos for Teatro Oficina, and Pentesileias, by Daniela Thomas, directed by Bete Coelho) and dance. He made four soundtracks for Grupo Corpo: Nazareth, from 1993, based on the work of Ernesto Nazareth; Parabelo, from 1997, in partnership with Tom Zé; Onqotô, from 2005, with Caetano Veloso and Sem Mim, from 2011, with Carlos Nuñez, on songs by Martín Codax.

Since 2005 he has performed several series of "lesson-concerts" with guitarist and composer Arthur Nestrovski.
