= David Machado (conductor) =

David Machado (1938–1995) was a Brazilian conductor and educador born in Cabo Verde, Minas Gerais. He studied at the Freiburg Music Academy in Germany and was recognized for his broad symphonic and operatic repertoire.

== Biography ==
Machado conducted important orchestras in Brazil and abroad. He served twice as artistic director and principal conductor of the Porto Alegre Symphony Orchestra (1979–1980 and 1992–1993). In Brazil, he also conducted the orchestras of the Municipal Theatres of Rio de Janeiro and São Paulo, as well as the Minas Gerais Symphony Orchestra. Internationally, he was principal conductor of OSSODRE (Orquesta Sinfónica del Servicio Oficial de Difusión, Radiotelevisión y Espectáculos) in Uruguay.

He spent approximately fifteen years in Italy, where he conducted the Orchestra Sinfonica Siciliana, the orchestra of the Teatro Massimo in Palermo, and the Rome Opera. He received important international awards and was invited to conduct major orchestras worldwide. Deeply committed to musical education, Machado founded the Rio de Janeiro Youth Symphony Orchestra in 1982.

He also served as a visiting professor at the School of Music of the Federal University of Minas Gerais during the 1980s. He was married for ten years to pianist and educator Vera Nardelli Campos (1936–2004), director of the School of Music at the time, with whom he collaborated in a number of musical and theatrical projects.

He later married the violinist Fiorella Soares, who continued the project Ação Social pela Música do Brasil, an initiative aimed at promoting musical education for young people. Machado died in 1995.

== Bibliography ==
- Porto Alegre Symphony Orchestra, History of Artistic Directors (in Portuguese)

Preceded by Pablo Komlós	Artistic Director and Conductor of the Porto Alegre Symphony Orchestra; 1979-80	Succeeded by Eleazar de Carvalho
Preceded by Eleazar de Carvalho	Artistic Director and Conductor of the Porto Alegre Symphony Orchestra; 1992-93	Succeeded by Cláudio Ribeiro
