= Claudio Ribeiro =

Brazilian conductor (born 1958)

Cláudio Ribeiro (Porto Alegre, 1958) is a Brazilian conductor.

== Early life and education ==
Ribeiro received a BM in Music in (1982) from the Rio Grande do Sul Federal University. Following this degree he pursued further development of his conducting and musicianship in Europe, first studying at the Hilversum International Courses for Conductor (the Netherlands) and then studying with Gennady Rozhdestvensky at the Accademia Chigiana in Siena (Italy). He also holds a Diploma in Opera from the Accademia Lirica di Osimo (Italy) and a Master Degree in Music from the University of Denver's Lamont School of Music.

In 1983, Ribeiro was a winner in the second National Competition for Young Conductors (Brazil).

== Career ==
=== Conducting ===
Ribeiro started his international conducting career in 1984 covering both symphonic and opera repertoire.

In 1993, Ribeiro became Music Director of the Orquestra de Câmera de Blumenau (Brazil) which would last until 2000, including a tour to Germany. During this time he also held the position of Music Director for the Orquestra Sinfônica de Porto Alegre (Brazil) (1995–1998).

In 2006, in the United States, Ribeiro was a Guest Conductor of the University of Denver's Lamont Symphony Orchestra, Adjunct Conductor of the Denver Young Artists Orchestra, conductor of Elkart Symphony Orchestra and Musica Sacra Chamber Orchestra, and Special Guest Conductor of the Denver Philharmonic for the 2006/07 season.

Ribeiro has also conducted the following orchestras:

- Orquestra Metropolitana de Lisboa (1997)
- Orchestra Filarmonica di Torino (Italy) (1997)
- Rousse Philharmonic Orchestra (Bulgaria) (1988)
- Orquesta Sinfónica Nacional (México D.F.) (1998)
- Orquestra Sinfônica do Paraná (Brazil) and Orquestra Sinfônica de Minas Gerais (Brazil) (1997, 2000, 2002)
- Orquesta del SODRE (Uruguay) (2003, 2004, 2006)
- Deutsche Kammerakademie (Germany) (2007)

=== Teaching ===
Since 1984, Cláudio has worked as a lecturer at the Rio Grande do Sul Federal University (Brazil). In 1999, he pioneered a project intended for young musicians named International Music Assemblage, with a goal to achieve worldwide peace through music. He is currently guest conducting, and president of Instituto Musica, a non-governmental Brazilian institution dedicated to promoting music and culture.

He also participates in juries of international competitions such as the Guitar Competition of Alessandria (Italy -1998).

=== Composing ===
Ribeiro is also a composer, and his works have been published by Goldberg Editions.

=== Collaborations ===
Claudio has had the privilege of working with artists including: Raina Kabaiwanska (Italy, 1988), Katia Ricciarelli (Italy, 1988), Renato Bruson (Italy, 1988), Lucio Gallo (Italy, 1988), Mischa Maisky (Brazil, 1996), Ingrid Haebler (Brazil, 1996), Hagai Shaham (Brazil, 1997), Nelson Freire (Brazil, 1995), Montserrat Caballe (Brazil, 1998), Kiri Te Kanawa (Brazil, 2007).

== Discography ==
Ribeiro's musical directions can be heard on the following recordings:

- Blumenau Chamber Orchestra – Music of Ástor Piazzolla (1994)
- Guest Conductor - Music of Bruno Kiefer (1986)
- Porto Alegre Symphony Orchestra - New Music of Rio Grande do Sul (1998)
- Guest Artist – Bach 150 Years (1985)
- Guest Artist - Music from the 16th and 17th Centuries (1986)

Ribeiro has also been featured in several exclusive recitals for broadcast:

- Bavarian Broadcast (Germany) (1993)
- RAI (Milan) (1988)
- Newman Center (Denver) (2007–2008)

== Awards ==
- Medal for Merit – Federal University of Brazil – 1978
- City Council Award – Libres (Argentina) – 1992
- Outstanding Guest Conductor – Eastern Illinois University - 1997
- Outstanding Artist – Porto Alegre Friends Association (2003)
