= Flávio Chamis =

Brazilian musician

Flávio Chamis is a Brazilian composer and conductor. His CD "Especiaria" was released in Brazil by the Biscoito Fino label. The CD was nominated for a 2007 Latin Grammy and one of its songs "Deuses do Céu" was a finalist in Session 1 of the 2007 John Lennon Songwriting Contest. Chamis also received the "2007 International Press Award" in Fort Lauderdale, Florida. On the classical front, Chamis studied at the Rubin Academy of Music, at the Tel Aviv University, graduating in Orchestral Conducting at the Hochschule für Musik Detmold. Chamis served as an assistant conductor to Leonard Bernstein on several occasions, and recorded for the Solstice Label with the Nouvel Orchestre Philharmonique de Radio France. Mr. Chamis was the music director of the Porto Alegre Symphony Orchestra in Brazil. Flávio Chamis presently lives in Pittsburgh, Pennsylvania, where he participates in many music-related activities, including combatting stigma around mental health and regular contributions as Osher (Osher Lifelong Learning Institute) acclaimed instructor at both Carnegie Mellon University and the University of Pittsburgh.

Preceded by Eleazar de Carvalho	Artistic Director, Principal Conductor, Orquestra Sinfônica de Porto Alegre; 1987–1989	Succeeded by Tulio Belardi & Arlindo Teixeira
