= John W. Downey =

American musician

John W. Downey (October 5, 1927 – December 14, 2004) was an American contemporary classical composer, conductor, pianist and educator. His works have been performed extensively in Western and Eastern Europe, South America, Australia, Africa, the Middle East, Israel, Asia, Mexico, and Canada, as well as throughout the United States.

== Biography ==
A native of Chicago, Downey earned a Bachelor of Music degree from DePaul University and a Master of Music from the Chicago Musical College of Roosevelt University, while working at night as a jazz pianist. Downey was later awarded a Fulbright Scholarship to study with his mentors Honegger, Milhaud and Boulanger in Paris where he earned a Prix de Composition from the Paris Conservatoire National de Musique and a Ph.D. (Docteur ès lettres) from the University of Paris-Sorbonne. Given the honorable title of “Chevalier de l’Ordre des Arts et des Lettres” for his scholarly achievements, Downey was knighted by the French government in 1980.

Downey inspired students of music, composition and theory at the University of Wisconsin–Milwaukee for 35 years, before retiring in 1998 as Distinguished Professor Emeritus of Music. He was Founder and Director of the Wisconsin Contemporary Music Forum as well as Director of Theory for Milwaukee Youth Symphony Orchestra.

Downey has said, “I teach because I truly believe that I have an obligation to pass on to future generations the knowledge which I have been privileged to attain.” A full-length biography was published by the University of Wisconsin-Milwaukee Press in 2005

Downey has been the recipient of many prestigious honors and commissions, some of which are from the National Endowment for the Arts, Ford Foundation, ASCAP, Copley Foundation, Millay Colony, Moebius Foundation, MacDowell Colony, Hartt School of Music, Rutgers University, Butler University, University of Wisconsin, Bennington College, Lawrence University, Fine Arts Quartet, Woodwind Arts Quartet, Milwaukee Symphony, Wisconsin Arts Board, Milwaukee Youth Symphony Orchestra, MacDowell Club of Milwaukee and Wisconsin String Academy. His recording Agort was nominated for a Pulitzer Prize in 1973. In 1990, the American Academy and Institute of Arts and Letters bestowed upon Downey the Walter Heinrichsen Award. He was a National Patron of Delta Omicron, an international professional music fraternity.

Among the numerous composers with whom Downey had the opportunity to work are Copland, Alexander Tcherepnin, Rieti, Sessions, Messiaen and Krenek. Lukas Foss, Zdenek Macal, Margery Deutsch, Izler Solomon and Pierre-Michel Le Conte are just some of the conductors who have performed his music. Many individual performers have commissioned works from Downey including George Sopkin, Erie Mills, Geoffrey Simon, Yolanda Marculescu, Jeffrey Peterson, Stanley DeRusha, Daniel Neesley, Harvey Phillips, Stephen Basson, Robert Thompson, Gary Karr and Tom Stacey.

Author of La Musique populaire dans l’œuvre de Bela Bartok, Downey is listed in Who’s Who in America, the International Who’s Who in Music, Dictionary of International Biography, Baker’s Biographical Dictionary of Musicians, and the New Grove Dictionary of American Music.

Downey often collaborated with his wife of 48 years, Irusha Downey, a linguist, translator, pianist and poet who preceded him in death in 2000. Her poem A Dolphin, set to music by Downey, is one of his most frequently performed compositions. She also performed Adagio Lyrico for two pianos with Downey (the first title of this composition was "Adagio pour les morts" and it is dedicated to Downey's brother Jimmie, who died in 1944).

Downey’s compositions have been recorded on the Orion, Composers’ Recordings, Gasparo, Cala, Heritage and Chandos record labels.

Downey died on December 18, 2004, in Milwaukee, Wisconsin.

== Works ==
- Adagio Lyrico for Two Pianos (1953)
- Chant to Michaelangelo (1958)
- Octet for Winds (1958)
- Eastlake Terrace for Piano (1959)
- Pyramids for Piano (1961)
- String Quartet No. 1 (1962)
- Sonata for Violin, Cello and Piano (1966)
- Jingalodeon (1968)
- Agort for Woodwind Quintet (1971)
- Almost 12 for Chamber Orchestra (1971)
- Symphonic Modules Five for Orchestra (1972)
- What if? for SATB Chorus, Brass Octet and Percussion (1973)
- A Dolphin for Tenor and Chamber Ensemble (1974)
- String Quartet No. 2 (1976)
- High Clouds and Soft Rain for 24 Flutes (1977)
- Lydian Suite for Cello (1978)
- The Edge of Space / Fantasy for Bassoon and Orchestra (1978)
- Silhouette for Double Bass (1980)
- Duo for Oboe and Harpsichord (1981)
- Portrait No. 3 for Flute and Piano (1984)
- Prayer for Violin, Viola and Cello (1984)
- Declamations (1985)
- Concerto for Double Bass and Orchestra (1987)
- Recombinance for Contrabass and Piano (1989)
- Call for Freedom for Symphonic Winds (1990)
- Fanfare for Freedom for Winds and 2 Harps (1991)
- Ode to Freedom for Orchestra (1993)
- For Those Who Suffered (Yad Vashem - An Impression) (1994)
- Ode to Freedom for Wind Ensemble (1995)
- Soliloquy for English Horn (1996)
