= Annex String Quartet =

Canadian string quartet

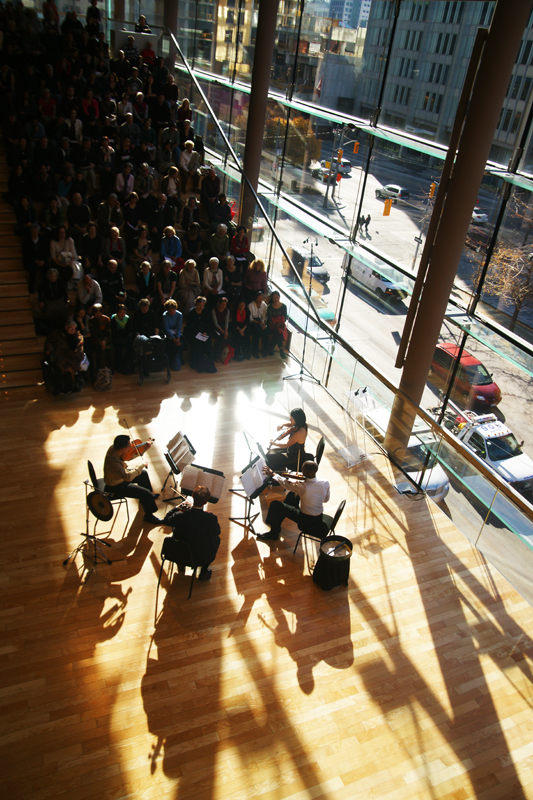
- The Annex String Quartet performing in the Richard Bradshaw Amphitheatre at the Four Seasons Centre in Toronto.

Background information
- Also known as: The Annex Quartet
- Origin: Toronto, Ontario, Canada
- Genres: Classical, World, Contemporary Classical
- Occupation: String quartet
- Instrument(s): 2 violins, 1 viola, 1 cello
- Years active: 2008–present
- Members: Stanislav Pronin; Carolyn Blackwell; Yunior Lopez; Peter Cosbey
- Past members: Melissa Wilmot; Teddy Wiggins
- Website: www.annexquartet.com

The Annex String Quartet, also known as The Annex Quartet, is a string quartet founded in 2008 by violist Yunior Lopez in Toronto, Ontario, Canada. Named after The Annex neighbourhood in downtown Toronto, the quartet began performing regularly in Toronto's bars, coffee shops, and non-classical venues like Aroma Espresso Bar and the St. Lawrence Market. In 2010, they made their American debut alongside the Kronos Quartet at Carnegie Hall, and have since appeared in over 100 performances, recordings, and broadcasts.

The group's focus has been on bridging the gap between classical and world music. They have performed and recorded in various musical styles, and continue to work with a diverse range of artists including classical pianist Jan Lisiecki, Cuban jazz pianist Hilario Durán, and Canadian jazz icon Jane Bunnett.

In June 2013, the Annex Quartet released their official debut album, The Roaring Twenties. In 2014, the group was to record a Cuban tour with Cuban Bolero singer Anais Abreu, but the concerts were cancelled. In 2019, the quartet released its second album, Latinoamericana.

The quartet was the ensemble-in-residence at Toronto's Midtown Music School and The Stratford Summer Music Festival. As of 2021, Lopez is with The Young Artists Orchestra of Las Vegas, which he founded in 2015. Blackwell is part of the Art of Time Ensemble, Cosbey is a member of the Thunder Bay Symphony Orchestra and Pronin performs and records independently.

== Members ==
- Stanislav Pronin, violin
- Carolyn Blackwell, violin
- Yunior Lopez, viola
- Peter Cosbey, cello

== Albums ==
- The Roaring Twenties (2013) Modica Music Records
- Latinoamericana (2019)

== Other Recordings/Film ==
- The Captive - Atom Egoyan (2014)
- Maqueque - Jane Bunnett and Maqueque (2014) Justin Time Records
- Folktales - Joanna Chapman-Smith, David Stone, and The Annex Quartet (2015)
