= David Bilger =

- Genres: Classical
- Instrument: Trumpet
- Formerly of: Philadelphia Orchestra
- Website: www.davidbilger.com

David Bilger (born 1961) is an American trumpet player and teacher. From 1995 to 2022 he served as principal trumpet in the Philadelphia Orchestra and is currently the professor of trumpet at Northwestern University.

== Biography ==
Bilger attend the University of Illinois for his bachelor of music and Juilliard for his master's. He performed with the Milwaukee Youth Symphony Orchestra for five years. He became the principal trumpet in the Dallas Symphony before joining the Philadelphia Orchestra in 1995. He was the principal trumpet until 2022. He is the professor of trumpet at Northwestern University and is on the faculty of the Curtis Institute of Music.

Bilger has appeared as a soloist with the Philadelphia Orchestra, the Dallas Symphony, the Houston Symphony, the Chamber Orchestra of Philadelphia, the Oakland Symphony, the Indianapolis Chamber Orchestra, and others.

== Discography ==
=== As a Soloist ===
- Wind Concerti with the Temple University wind symphony
- From the Dark Earth
- Bach, J.S.: Brandenburg Concertos Nos. 1–6 with Lincoln Center Chamber Music Society
- Shostakovich: Piano Concertos Nos. 1&2 with the Philadelphia Orchestra
- Haydn: Trumpet Concerto in E-Flat, Symphony No. 86 with the Philadelphia Orchestra
- First Chairs: Cantos for Solo Instruments

=== Chamber Music ===
- Gabrieli-National Brass Ensemble
- Ewald: Brass Quintets Nos. 1&3
- Trumpets in Stride
- Baroque Trumpetissimo
- The Heroick Mr Handel
- The Birth of Rhapsody In Blue: Paul Whiteman's Historic Aeolian Hall Concert of 1924
- Music for Ceremony & Celebration

=== Select Orchestra Discography ===
- Rachmaninov Variations with the Philadelphia Orchestra
- Stravinsky/Stokowski-The Rite of Spring/Bach Transcriptions with the Philadelphia Orchestra
- Mahler Symphony No. 5 with the Philadelphia Orchestra
- Shostakovich Symphony No. 5 with the Philadelphia Orchestra

=== Featured with ===
- The All-Star Orchestra
- CancerBlows
