= Bassoon Concerto (Panufnik) =

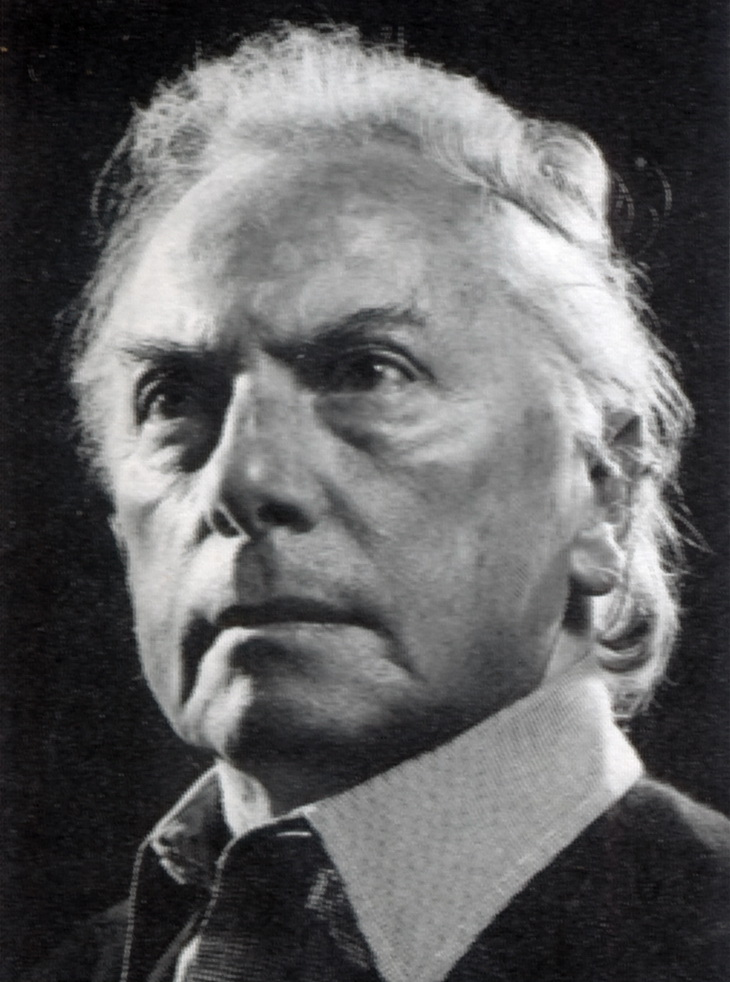
Andrzej Panufnik in the early 1990s

The Bassoon Concerto, composed by Andrzej Panufnik in 1985, is a concerto for bassoon and orchestra dedicated to the assassination of Father Jerzy Popiełuszko–anti-communist Polish priest who served as a chaplain of Solidarity–perpetrated by Security Service police agents in 1984. The work was commissioned by the American bassoonist Robert Thompson.

The concerto was premiered in Milwaukee in 1986, with Thompson as the soloist. Panufnik and Thompson recorded the concerto in 1987, with Panufnik conducting the BBC Symphony Orchestra. In the same year, they performed the work in Father Jerzy's church.

The concerto is scored for a small orchestra – strings, a flute, and two clarinets. It is in five continuous movements: a prologue, two recitatives, an aria and an epilogue. Panufnik wrote of the movements: "I chose these operatic-sounding titles partly in order to emphasise the underlying drama of the work, and partly because they indicate the parlando character of the recitatives, as well as the singing quality required of the bassoon in the Aria." The aria, marked "adagio lamentoso", is longer than the other movements combined.

In 2014, the German record label Classic Produktion Osnabrück released a recording of the concerto by Michael von Schönermark (soloist) and the Konzerthausorchester Berlin, conducted by Łukasz Borowicz, as part of a complete cycle of Panufnik's symphonic works.
