= Helen Cha-Pyo =

American conductor

- Born: Seoul, South Korea
- Education: Oberlin Conservatory of Music; Eastman School of Music (MM)
- Occupations: Conductor, organist

Helen H. Cha-Pyo is a South Korean-born American conductor and organist. She has served as music director of the Empire State Youth Orchestra and as artistic director of the Wharton Institute for the Performing Arts' New Jersey Youth Symphony.

== Early musical life and education ==
Born in Seoul, South Korea, Cha-Pyo won numerous competitions and awards as a young pianist, including Grand Prize in the Young Musicians Competition in Los Angeles. At age 13, her family immigrated from South Korea to the United States and settled near Poughkeepsie, New York. Before graduating from Poughkeepsie High School in 1986, Cha-Pyo had already studied both piano and organ at The Juilliard School (pre-college division) in New York City.

After graduating from the Oberlin Conservatory of Music in Ohio, Cha-Pyo relocated to Rochester, New York, where she earned a Master of Music degree in both conducting and organ performance from Eastman School of Music.

== Career ==
While at Eastman, Cha-Pyo served as the assistant conductor of the Eastman Philharmonia and the Eastman Chorale, as well as studied with the organist David Higgs. Cha-Pyo was the recipient of the Charles Nicholls Memorial Award at Eastman.

From 1996 through June 2003, Cha-Pyo served as the artistic director and conductor of the Riverside Philharmonic Orchestra and Choir in New York City. She has also held the role of associate director of music at Riverside Church in New York City. Cha-Pyo also pioneered the Riverside Music Educational Program, which currently aids thousands of inner-city students in New York City. Since 1995 she has been the assistant conductor of the Britt Festival Orchestra in Jacksonville, Oregon and has guest conducted several orchestras and choruses throughout Asia, Europe, and the United States. Cha-Pyo has conducted orchestras such as the Altenberg Festival Orchestra, Beethoven Chamber Orchestra, Bergen Philharmonic Orchestra, Eastman Philharmonia, Aspen Music Festival Chamber Orchestra, New Washington Symphony Orchestra, and the Washington Korean Orchestra. She has also served as the Musical Advisor at the Rachmaninoff International Music Festival in Russia. As winner of the 1992 John Rodland Memorial Organ Competition sponsored by the American Guild of Organists, she performed in numerous organ recitals throughout the Northeastern United States and Asia, including appearances with symphony orchestras as an organ soloist.

In 1999, Cha-Pyo worked with the Asian Youth Orchestra in Hong Kong, as the rehearsal conductor and assistant to Sergiu Comissiona. That same year, she conducted the U.S. premiere of "A Garland for Linda," a musical tribute to Linda McCartney. In the fall of 2000, Cha-Pyo conducted the world premiere performance of "No Easy Walk to Freedom," an opera based on the life of Nelson Mandela, at the New Opera Festival at Hofstra University.

Cha-Pyo was the music director and conductor of the Empire State Youth Orchestra in Albany, New York from September 2002 to June 2018.

Cha-Pyo was named artistic director designate of the Wharton Institute for the Performing Arts and Conductor of the New Jersey Youth Symphony starting July 2018 and serving until 2026. She served as the adjunct professor of orchestral studies and conductor of the Montclair State University Symphony Orchestra (NJ) in 2019. She also conducted the Nebraska All-State Festival Orchestra in the Fall of 2018, the American String Teachers Association National Festival's Orchestra in New Mexico, and the Oregon Youth Orchestra in Newport, OR, both in the Spring of 2019.

== Personal life ==
She resides in Morristown, New Jersey with her husband and two sons.

Preceded by Jin Kim	Music Director/Conductor, Empire State Youth Orchestra; 2002–2018	Succeeded by Carlos Ágreda
