= Winds Across the Bay =

Defunct youth orchestra in El Cerrito, California

Winds Across the Bay (also known as Winds, WAB, W.A.B, Winds Across the Bay Youth Orchestra)
- Classical youth orchestra
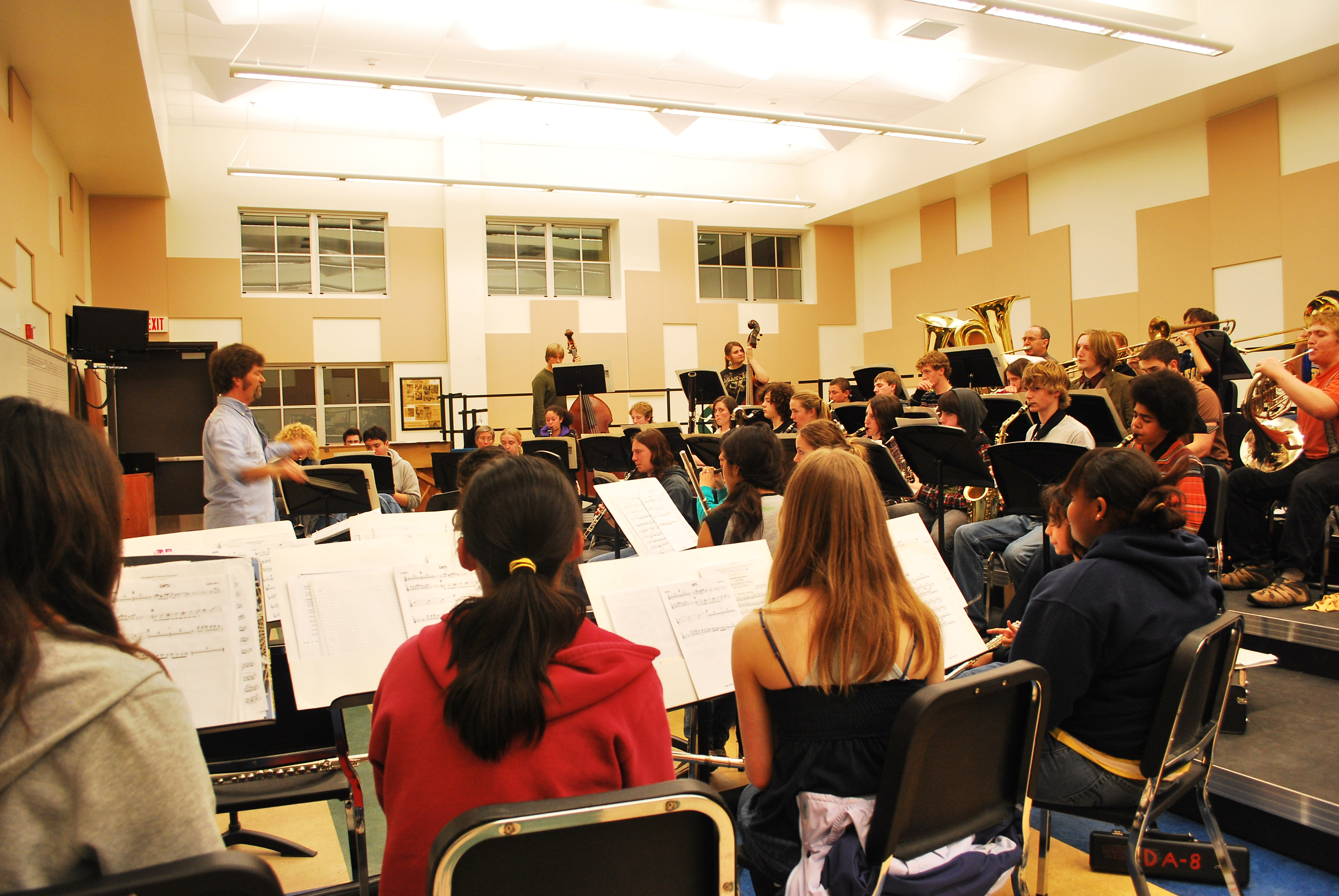
- (2010)
- Founded: 1993 (33 years ago)
- Disbanded: 2019 (7 years ago)
- Location: El Cerrito, California, U.S.
- Website: windsacrossthebay.org

Winds Across the Bay (Winds) was a non-profit youth orchestra founded in 1993 in the East Bay Area city of El Cerrito, California, United States.

== History and operations ==
The orchestra had the philosophy that "opportunities must be provided to support and encourage youth in the study and love of instrumental music". It was open to middle and high school students who displayed a high-intermediate to advanced musical proficiency in any wind, brass or percussion instrument, as well as a desire to enhance their ability in the instrumental performing arts.

Winds featured The Minors, a middle-school ensemble designed for entry-level and intermediate and The Majors, an ensemble for advanced and experienced musicians.

Winds offered Tuesday-evening rehearsals starting in September through May, with three concerts each year: winter and spring concerts, usually held at the Lesher Center for the Performing Arts in Walnut Creek, and summer-session concerts at various locations.

Winds worked with many local schools to augment the musical education which the schools were able to provide, and to afford youth musicians the opportunity to play high-profile performances in their own communities, such as the Lesher Center.

=== Member schools ===
Member organizations included:

- Albany High School
- Albany Middle School
- Berkeley High School
- Del Valle High School
- El Cerrito High School
- El Sobrante Christian School
- Hercules High School
- Holy Names High School
- Kensington Hilltop School
- Marin Academy
- Pacific Academy
- Piedmont High School
- Pinole Valley High School
- Portola Middle School
- St. Mary's High School
- School of the Madeleine

== See also ==
- Culture of El Cerrito, California
- List of youth orchestras in the United States
