= Eugene-Springfield Youth Orchestras =

Youth orchestra in Oregon

Eugene-Springfield Youth Orchestras are the major youth orchestras serving Eugene, Oregon, United States and surrounding areas.

A youth orchestra's influence can stretch far across a community:

- It instills a sense of accomplishment in young musicians.
- It provides inspiration and performance opportunities to aspiring young musicians.
- It helps young people discover a path toward personal growth.
- It offers an additional tier of activities for the developing musician.
- It creates cultural awareness and depth within a community.

— Jason Duckles, former
Youth Orchestras director

== History ==
The Eugene Junior Symphony Orchestra was founded in 1934, supported by the newly-formed Eugene Junior Symphony Association. Founders included Mrs. C.A. Horton and Genevieve Tugman. The first conductor was Rex Underwood, and Delbert Moore was assistant conductor. In 1946, Douglas Orme became conductor, and the association began providing scholarships to musicians for private lessons.

The orchestra was renamed the Eugene Junior Symphony Association (EJSA) in 1959. EJSA sponsored a second orchestra, Junior Strings, conducted by Nathan Cammack, as a feeder orchestra for the Junior Symphony. In 1987, EJSA became the Eugene Youth Symphony Association (EYSA), with Richard Long its first music director. The Junior Strings added woodwinds, brass and percussion and became the Eugene Junior Orchestra.

EYSA became the Arts Umbrella in 1994, broadening its scope to include dance and drama classes. In 1995, David Chinburg became conductor of the Junior Orchestra, and the organization also sponsored a Cadet Orchestra (now called the Little Symphony), led by Forrest Moyer. A fourth orchestra, Encore Strings, was added to the existing program, later becoming String Academy 2.

The Arts Umbrella received the Fentress Award in 2004, for "exceptional work and achievement in the arts".

Richard Long continued to serve as the director until the beginning of the 2009 season. The 2009 season was directed by Dave Chinburg, and orchestra conductors included University of Oregon music professors Robert Ponto and Fritz Gearhart for the first half of the season, and Lane Community College music instructor Ron Bertucci for the last half of the season. Jason Duckles was hired then as youth symphony conductor. Myra Tam became executive director. In 2011 Michele Pound was appointed executive director and Dana Demant became Junior Orchestra conductor.

The eightieth season, in 2013, saw the organization renamed yet again as the Eugene-Springfield Youth Orchestras (ESYO), celebrating its 80th anniversary in 2014 with a "concert extravaganza". Alumna Tracy Bonham Fine debuted her new song, "We Are the Future," at the concert.

Jason Duckles conducted the youth symphony from 2010 to 2016. He noted that the long tradition of nonprofit youth orchestras reflects the values of the community.

Karen Doerfert became conductor of the Little Symphony in 2013, and in 2014 Holly Spencer was hired as ESYO's executive director.

The orchestras are now partly funded by a Eugene-based non-profit organization that provides arts education opportunities for children in Lane County, Oregon. The Eugene Youth Symphony performs several concerts annually and has been conducted since 2016 by David Jacobs, director of orchestral studies at the University of Oregon. The Eugene Opera initiated a program in 2020 to introduce ESYO players to the challenges of playing in an opera orchestra.

== Programs ==
Modern programs of the Eugene-Springfield Youth Orchestras include two String Academies, the Little Symphony, the Junior Orchestra, and the Eugene-Springfield Youth Symphony. The String Academies, working in collaboration with the school districts, teach classes, provide instruments and offer scholarships for low-income families. Due to the pandemic the ESYO put on virtual concerts during 2019—2021. The Oregon Mozart Players offered ESYO musicians a chance to play in their orchestra during the 2023 The Fountain of Youth Concert, featuring the winners of the 2023 Oregon Young Soloists Competition.
