= Roberto Minczuk =

Brazilian conductor

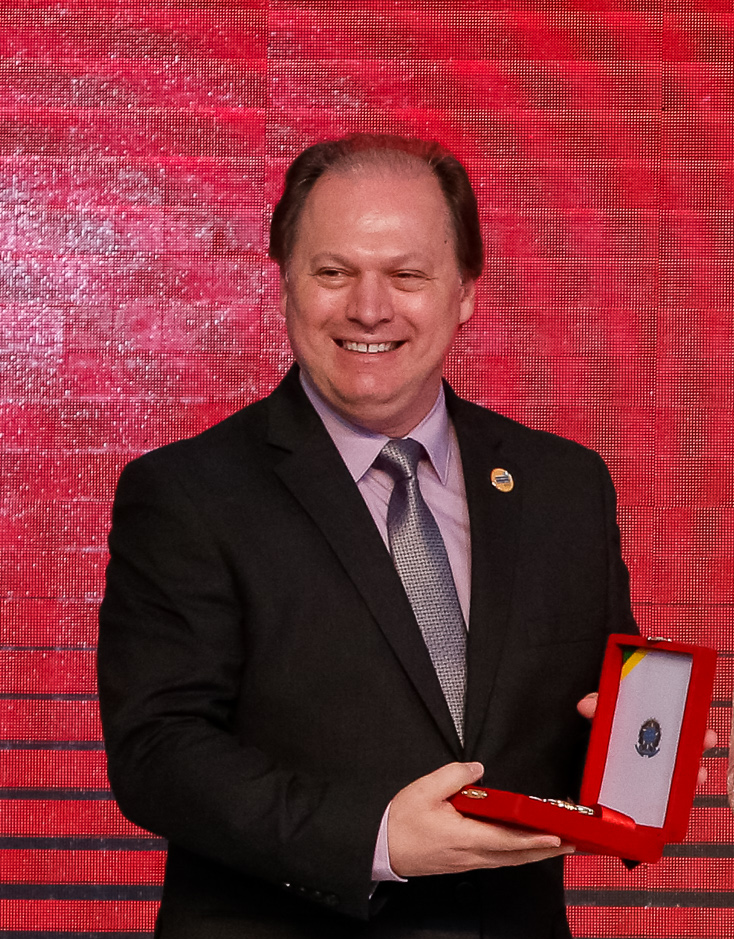
Roberto Minczuk receiving the Order of Cultural Merit in 2017

Roberto Minczuk (born April 23, 1967) is a Brazilian conductor, maestro of the São Paulo Municipal Symphony Orchestra, music director of the New Mexico Philharmonic, laureate of the Calgary Philharmonic Orchestra, artistic director of the Campos do Jordão Winter Festival, and conductor emeritus of the Brazilian Symphony Orchestra.

== Early life ==
Of Belarusian and Polish descent, Minczuk was born in São Paulo. His father worked as conductor of the São Paulo Military Police choir and music theory teacher who supported his son's music career. Minczuk studied at the Escola Municipal de Música. When Mincuk was 10, he joined the Municipal Symphony Orchestra playing the French horn, being the youngest musician to do so.

In 1981 he went to the United States to study at Juilliard School, graduating in 1987. After graduation, Minczuk joined the Leipzig Gewandhaus Orchestra, invited by Kurt Masur. In 1984 he debuted as a conductor of the São Paulo State Symphony Orchestra.

== Career ==
Minczuk held positions as associate artistic director and associate conductor of the São Paulo State Symphony Orchestra, of the Ribeirão Preto Symphony and titular conductor of the University of Brasília Symphony Orchestra. He is made music director of the New Mexico Philharmonic in 2017.

He has conducted philharmonic orchestras in New York, Los Angeles, Israel and orchestras in Philadelphia and Minnesota; symphonic musicians from St. Louis, Atlanta, Baltimore, Toronto, and Ottawa, among others. In Europe, he hosted the BBC Symphony Orchestra and the BBC National Orchestra of Wales; the London Philharmonic, Oslo, Hallé, Rotterdam; the national orchestras of France, Lyon and Royal Scottish National Orchestra. He has performed with the London Philharmonic on tour in the United States and the latest productions of The Seven Deadly Sins and The Flight Across the Ocean at Lyon Opera in France and the Edinburgh International Festival. In 2007, he debuted in front of the Cleveland Orchestra and the San Francisco Symphony Orchestra.

He premiered in the United States as the New York Philharmonic in 1998, and in 2002 he was invited to become Associate conductor, the last position held by Leonard Bernstein.

== Controversies ==
In 2008, when conducting the Brazilian Symphony Orchestra (OSB), 62 musicians asked for Minczuk to resign. According to them, the conductor's absence from the rehearsals, his simultaneous work on OSB, the Rio de Janeiro Municipal Theater and the Calgary Philharmonic, and his "harsh and authoritarian" temperament motivated the request. In 2011, changes in the audition system led to 35 musicians being fired from the orchestra for refusing to be auditioned; they organized a protest and a boycott campaign for new musicians who wished to join OSB. Minczuk justified the decisions affirming that they would bring a renewal to OSB and said "all the lies about the crisis wouldn't resist to time and hard work".

In 2015 Minczuk left the Brazilian Symphony Orchestra, as the budget of the orchestra deteriorated and they could not honor his contract. The dispute still in the local courts resulting in several legal battles against the board of the orchestra. It’s unclear if Mr Minczuk was ever compensated. Since his departure and these legal battles, the orchestra is still struggling to keep performing due to lack of funds.

== Honors ==
Minczuk was awarded the Lincoln Center's 2000 Martin E. Segal Award. In 2010 Minczuk was awarded the Order of Ipiranga, issued by the São Paulo state government, and the Brazilian Order of Cultural Merit in 2017.

In 2004, together with Mário Adnet and Paulo Jobim, Minczuk was awarded the 5th Annual Latin Grammy Award for Classical Music, for the album Jobim Sinfônico.
