= Robert Thompson (bassoonist) =

American bassoonist

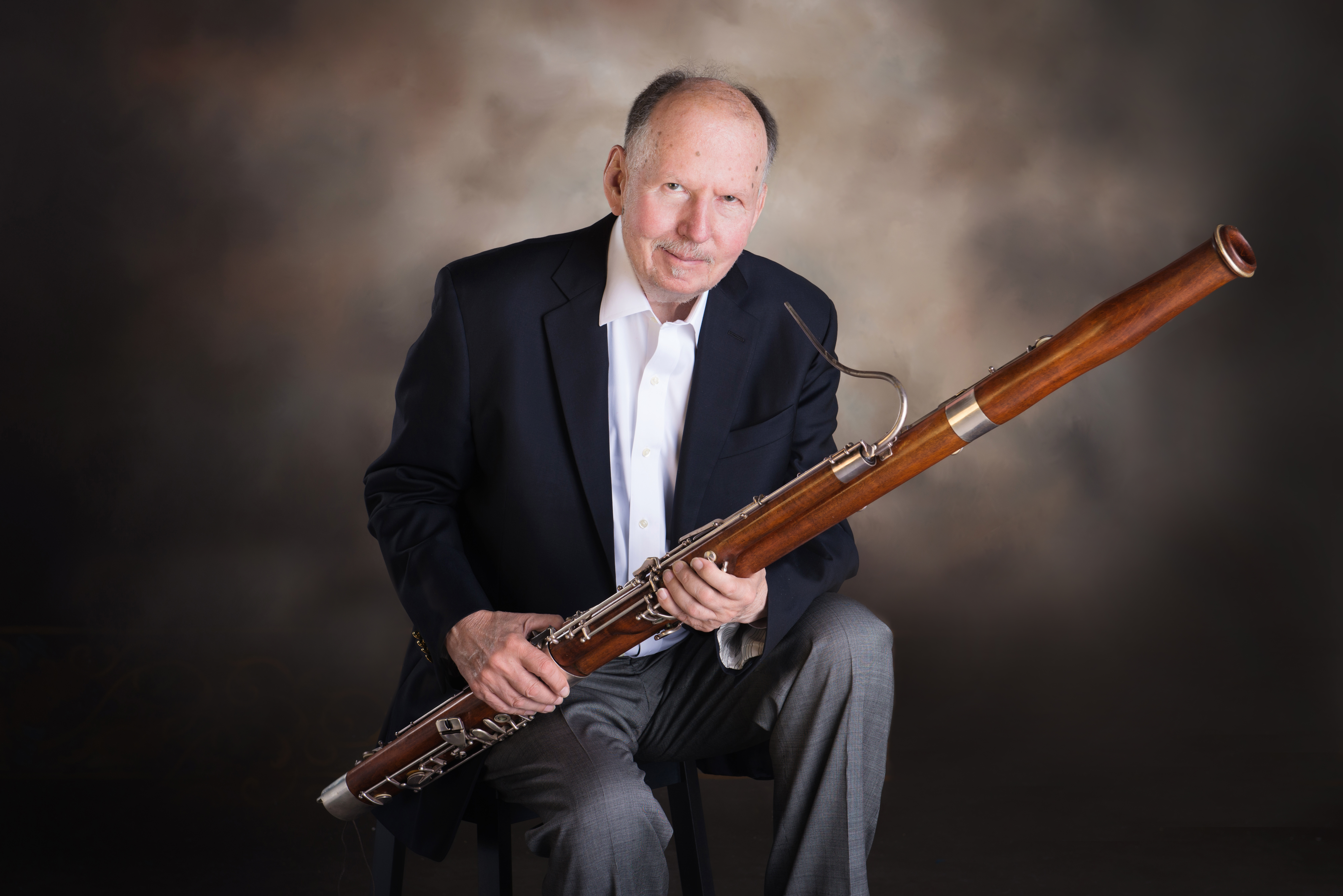
- Thompson in 2015

Background information
- Born: 16 August 1936 (age 89); Dallas, Texas
- Instrument: bassoon
- Website: robertthompson75.com/

Robert Thompson (born August 16, 1936) is an American bassoonist.

As well as performing with many of the world's leading orchestras and chamber groups, Robert Thompson has recorded neglected works by 19th-century composer Franz Danzi and an album of music for bassoon by Antonio Vivaldi. He has also commissioned and performed works by contemporary composers such as John W. Downey and Andrzej Panufnik.

== Early life ==
Thompson was born in Dallas and grew up in West Texas. He studied both at the Juilliard School and at the Yale School of Music and his teachers included Harold Goltzer, Bernard Garfield and Robert Bloom.

== Career ==
He first performed with the Midland-Odessa Symphony Orchestra while he was still a student. Later in his career he was Principal Bassoon of the Indianapolis Symphony Orchestra. He has appeared and recorded with many orchestras including the BBC Symphony Orchestra, the English Chamber Orchestra, the London Symphony Orchestra, the London Mozart Players, the Manchester Camerata, and the London Musici. As a chamber musician, he has performed with many groups including the Coull Quartet, the Fine Arts Quartet, and the Chicago Symphony String Quartet.

Thompson has recorded for Chandos Records, the Musical Heritage Society, Harmonia Mundi, and Heritage Records. His recordings include the neglected works for bassoon and string trio by Franz Danzi and four bassoon concertos by Antonio Vivaldi. He also recorded works by contemporary composers John Downey, Gordon Jacob and Jurriaan Andriessen amidst some local controversy in Wisconsin in 1981. He had premiered the Downey work in 1979 with the Milwaukee Symphony Orchestra, but that ensemble was not approached about making the Chandos recording, which was done in London by Thompson with English Chamber Orchestra and London Symphony Orchestra musicians. The University of Wisconsin System eventually approved the contracted recording & travel costs exceeding $30,000 (ca. $106,000 in 2024 dollars) budgeted by Thompson and Downey's home campus, The University of Wisconsin-Milwaukee.

He commissioned the Bassoon Concerto by Andrzej Panufnik, which premiered in Milwaukee in 1986. Thompson recorded the concerto in 1987, with Panufnik conducting the BBC Symphony Orchestra. In the same year, Thompson performed the concerto in the church of Jerzy Popiełuszko, the murdered Roman Catholic Priest to whom the piece is dedicated.

== Teaching ==
For many years, Robert Thompson was a member of faculty at the University of Wisconsin-Milwaukee as Professor of Bassoon and Director of the Institute for Chamber Music. Thompson has also taught at the Royal Academy of Music, the Royal Northern College of Music and the Chopin Academy of Music in Warsaw.

== See also ==
- Bassoon Concerto (Panufnik)
