= Porto Alegre Symphony Orchestra =

Brazilian orchestra

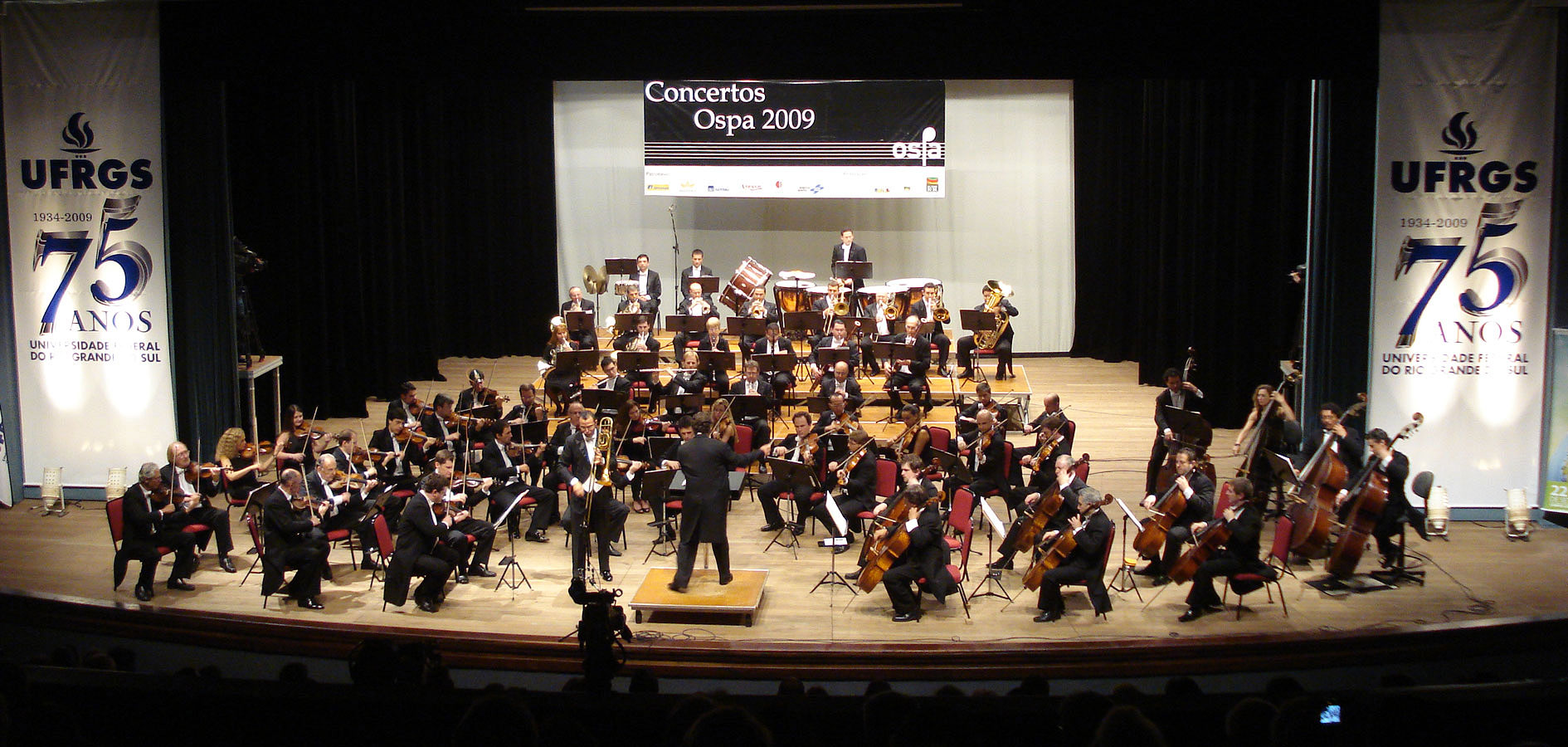
Concert, 2009

The Porto Alegre Symphony Orchestra (Portuguese: Orquestra Sinfônica de Porto Alegre, OSPA) is a Brazilian orchestra based in Porto Alegre, in the state of Rio Grande do Sul. It was founded in 1950 under the direction of the Hungarian conductor Pablo Komlós. Since January 22, 1965, the Porto Alegre Symphony Orchestra is a foundation funded by the state government of Rio Grande do Sul.

A Symphonic Chorus is integrated with the orchestra in some concerts.

The orchestra today comprises around 100 professional musicians.

== Artistic Directors ==
- 1950/1978 – Pablo Komlós
- 1978/1980 – David Machado
- 1981/1987 – Eleazar de Carvalho
- 1987/1989 – Flavio Chamis
- 1990/1991 – Tulio Belardi & Arlindo Teixeira
- 1991/1992 – Eleazar de Carvalho
- 1992/1993 – David Machado
- 1995/1998 – Claudio Ribeiro
- 1999/2001 – Tiago Flores
- 2001/2002 – Ion Bressan
- 2003/2010 – Isaac Karabtchevsky
- 2010/2014 – Tiago Flores
- 2015/2024 – Evandro Matté
- 2025/present – Manfredo Schmiedt
