= Jr. Philharmonic Orchestra of California =

Youth orchestra in Los Angeles, California

- Youth orchestra
- Conductor Ernst Katz
- Former name: Little Symphony
- Founded: 1937
- Location: Los Angeles, California
- Website: Official website

Jr. Philharmonic Orchestra of California is an American youth orchestra, founded in Los Angeles, California, on January 22, 1937, by Ernst Katz. The Jr. Philharmonic is a non-commercial venture. From its inception, it has been a family-run orchestra.

== History and background ==
The orchestra was originally called the Little Symphony and it started on January 22, 1937, with four boys out of Katz's home in East Los Angeles. As the orchestra grew in size, Katz had to move furniture out of his house to accommodate them. Neighbors of his would sit out on their lawns and listen. On May 15, 1938, they had their public debut at a community hall in East L.A. Those in attendance included Los Angeles mayor Frank Shaw, California entrepreneur Laura Scudder and singer Carrie Jacobs-Bond. After hearing about their performance, William Randolph Hearst Jr. invited the orchestra to play every Sunday on his radio station.

In the orchestra's second year, Katz said he needed a "gimmick", so he started 'The Battle of the Batons' competition, where five celebrities were invited to an anniversary performance to conduct the orchestra. They had no rehearsal, and the audience picked the winner. Notable winners include: Marjorie Main, Jimmy Durante, Jack Benny, George Segal, Danny Thomas, Ed Asner, Chevy Chase, Henry Fonda, Glenn Ford, Leslie Nielsen, Ben Vereen, Connie Stevens, Richard Pryor, Ryan O'Neal, June Lockhart, Helen Reddy and Weird Al Yankovic.

The orchestra also boasts a roster of notable guest musicians who have performed with them, including: Isaac Stern, Jerome Kern, Meredith Willson, Richard Sherman, Jose Iturbi, Pat Boone Dimitri Tiomkin, Rudolf Friml, Lauritz Melchior, Shirley Jones and Edgar Bergen.

After Katz's death in 2009, family members have taken over the orchestra.

== See also ==
- List of youth orchestras in the United States
