= New Jersey Youth Symphony =

American non-profit organization

The New Jersey Youth Symphony (NJYS) is a non-profit organization based in New Providence, New Jersey. Founded in 1979, it provides young instrumentalists from all around New Jersey with music performance and educational experiences. There are three string ensembles, three full symphony orchestras, three flute ensembles, chamber music programs, music theory classes presented in accordance with the Associated Board of the Royal Schools of Music (UK), a summer camp, and other various outreach activities. It operates under the auspices of the Wharton Institute of the Performing Arts. The symphony performs regularly in the United States and Europe. Helen Cha-Pyo has served as the artistic director of the Wharton Institute for the Performing Arts and conductor of the NJYS since July 2018.

== History ==
The New Jersey Youth Symphony was founded by interested central New Jersey parents and the administration of the New Jersey Symphony Orchestra (NJSO). At that time the NJSO provided its assistant conductor, George Marriner Maull, to serve as conductor of the NJYS. During the first year, Maull led a group of 65 high school-aged students, and in 1980 he was named the orchestra's music director.

In 1997, George Marriner Maull resigned in order to devote more time to his other conducting post, the Philharmonic Orchestra of New Jersey, now called The Discovery Orchestra (TDO).

The youth symphony has toured Europe six times and has performed at Carnegie Hall, Lincoln Center and the New Jersey Performing Arts Center on a number of occasions. The group has performed at the European Youth Music Festival in Belgium, Smetana Hall in Prague, and Musikverein in Vienna.

== Ensembles ==
The ensembles of the New Jersey Youth Symphony (youngest to oldest):

- Primo Strings : Beginning String Ensemble for students in grades 3–5
- Concertino Strings : Secondary String Ensemble for students in grades 5–7
- Sinfonia : Advanced String Ensemble for students in grades 5–8
- CWE : Concertino Wind Ensemble for students in grades 5–8
- Flute Choir, Flute Forum and Fortissimo Flutes
- Philharmonia : Beginning Full Orchestra for students in grades 6–9
- Youth Orchestra : Full orchestra for students in grades 7–12
- Youth Symphony : Advanced Full Orchestra for high school aged students 9–12

Conducted by Helen Cha-Pyo and regularly performs at Rutgers University, Bergen PAC, NJPAC and Carnegie Hall. Tours international destinations including Italy and Vienna every three years during the summer.

Other Ensembles/Programs

- Fall Chamber Music : For NJYS members

Performs at NJYS Music Center, Master Class Programs, Local chamber programs, nursing homes, schools, and other venues

- Music Theory/Musicianship Training
- Summer Camp : For Middle School aged students either currently in NJYS or not in the organization who are accepted by audition, includes 10½ days of intense study all day

Programs : Camp Orchestra, Chamber Orchestras, Chamber Ensembles, Private Lessons, Camp Choir, Tennis, and fun competitions and 2 Performances - Chamber Music and Full Concert

== Play-a-thon ==
Every year, the orchestra holds a fundraiser performance at the Jersey Gardens Mall in Elizabeth, New Jersey with all of the 550 members of the organization. The orchestra plays popular movie music from The Lord of the Rings, Star Wars, Pirates of the Caribbean, and more. Members of the audience have had the opportunity to participate in an auction to win the chance to conduct the orchestra through Stars and Stripes Forever by John Philip Sousa.
