= Reading Symphony Youth Orchestra =

Youth orchestra in Reading, Pennsylvania

The Reading Symphony Youth Orchestra (RSYO) is a youth orchestra that is located in Reading, Pennsylvania. It is known for its performances of classical orchestral music.

== History ==
Created in 1989, the orchestra was formed by the Education Committee of the Reading Symphony Orchestra (RSO) board of directors with the intention of providing experience to local teenagers in the field of classical music. Supported by the RSO and a parent association, the orchestra holds annual holiday, fall, and spring concerts, as well as occasional international tours. The orchestra has toured the United Kingdom; French Canada; and Germany, Austria, Switzerland, and the Czech Republic in 2001, 2003, and 2004 respectively. The most recent tours were both to Italy in 2007 and 2012.

Peter Brye was the founding conductor and music director of the RSYO from 1989 to 2016, and is the current assistant principal cellist of the RSO. Brye is a graduate of the University of Oregon and the Pennsylvania State University. He taught cello, instrumental conducting, and conducted the University Community Orchestra for 26 years at Millersville University, where he retired from in 2007.

Having served as the music director of the RSYO for 27 years, Brye announced his retirement at the end of the 2015–2016 season. After a competitive search process by the RSO board of directors and staff members, Christopher Cinquini was chosen as the new conductor beginning with the 2016–2017 season. Cinquini holds a Bachelor of Music Education degree from the Pennsylvania State University as well as a master's in music in orchestral conducting from West Chester University. In addition to the Reading Symphony Youth Orchestra, Cinquini also serves as the principal conductor for the Berks Opera Company and orchestra director for grades 7-12 in the Boyertown Area School District, in Boyertown, Pennsylvania.

== Reading Symphony Junior String Orchestra ==
The Reading Symphony Junior String Orchestra (RSJSO) was formed in 1999 for students in grades 4-8 to help prepare students for membership in the RSYO. The RSJSO, under the direction of Brian Mishler, performs both educational arrangements and appropriate standard repertoire. Each season the orchestra has a minimum of four performances, demonstrating a repertoire that includes a wide variety of styles and difficulty.
