= Mankato Area Youth Symphony Orchestra =

The Mankato Area Youth Symphony Orchestra (MAYSO) is a youth symphony from Mankato, Minnesota, directed by Dr. Joseph Rodgers. Dr. Rodgers, the director of orchestral studies at Minnesota State University, Mankato, is in his third year at the helm for the Mankato Area Youth Symphony Orchestra. In addition to its principal symphony, MAYSO also features the North Star Strings, a group for younger students. North Star Strings is directed by Mrs. Eleda Morneau.
