= Young People's Symphony Orchestra =

American youth orchestra (founded 1936)

- Youth orchestra
- Short name: YPSO
- Founded: 1936
- Location: Berkeley, California, U.S.
- Music director: David Ramadanoff
- Website: www.ypsomusic.org

The Young People's Symphony Orchestra (YPSO) is a youth orchestra in Berkeley, California. It is the oldest youth orchestra in California and the second oldest in the United States. The orchestra performs concerts throughout the San Francisco Bay Area.

== History ==
The Young People's Symphony Orchestra was founded in 1936. Since its existence, it has performed in many notable locations, such as Carnegie Hall, the Dean Lesher Regional Center for the Arts in Walnut Creek, California, and the International Kiwanis Convention.

== Location ==
The YPSO originally had rehearsals in the Crowden School at UC Berkeley. However, starting in 2015, it relocated to the First Congregational Church of Oakland, which resulted from an ended agreement.

== Tours ==
=== United Kingdom Tour 2016 ===
In the 2015–2016 season, the YPSO toured the UK, specifically in London and Coventry. In Coventry, the orchestra had a residency at the University of Warwick. They performed Carmina Burana at Coventry Cathedral with the Warwick Chorus and Symphonic Dances, Overture to Candide, and Crown Imperial with the Warwick Orchestra at Butterworth Hall at the Warwick Arts Centre. In London, the orchestra played Enigma Variations at St John's Smith Square.
