= Empire State Youth Orchestra =

Empire State Youth Orchestras
- Youth orchestra
- Short name: ESYO
- Founded: 1979
- Location: Capital District, New York, United States
- Principal conductor: Etienne Abelin
- Website: www.esyo.org

Empire State Youth Orchestras (ESYO) is an ensemble of classical music performing groups aimed at providing talented young musicians with an opportunity to participate in group ensembles with other similar musicians. Based in the Capital Region of upstate New York, ESYO ensembles are composed of a total of approximately 300 talented and musically advanced high- and middle-school students from New York and western New England. The most advanced group, the symphony orchestra, is considered one of the premier youth orchestras in the United States, and regularly performs concerts at the Troy Savings Bank Music Hall, Proctors Theatre, Saratoga Performing Arts Center, Ozawa Hall at the Tanglewood Music Center, and Carnegie Hall and in New York City.

== History ==
In 1979, Barry Richman founded ESYO, consisting of a single orchestra, known as the "Youth Orchestra." Along with two colleagues, Lois Lyman and Eleanor Barnes, Richman brought together a group of parents and music educators. Together they organized an orchestra for some of the talented young musicians throughout the Capital Region. The Empire State Junior Orchestra was added in 1981 for middle-school aged students, and over time, additional ensembles were added to allow even more young people to participate. Today's ESYO consists of fourteen performing ensembles including over 300 musicians: two full orchestras, a wind orchestra, a string ensemble, two jazz ensembles, three percussion ensembles, a choir, and four ensembles for very young children. Previous conductors of the orchestra have included Victoria Bond, Eiji Oue, Paavo Järvi, Francisco Noya, Jin Kim, Burton Kaplan, Helen Cha-Pyo, and Carlos Ágreda.

== Ensembles ==
ESYO is composed of fourteen ensembles:

- ESYO Symphony Orchestra - Etienne Abelin, conductor
- ESYO Repertory Orchestra - David Beck, conductor
- ESYO Wind Orchestra - Robert Hansbrough, conductor
- ESYO String Orchestra - Joseph Gumpper, conductor
- ESYO Youth Jazz Orchestra- Peter Bellino, conductor
- ESYO Repertory Jazz Orchestra - David Fisk, conductor
- ESYO Youth Percussion Ensemble - Mark Foster and Rob Sanderl, co-conductors
- ESYO Repertory Percussion Ensemble - Genoveffa Vitale, conductor
- ESYO Chamber Percussion Ensemble - Jim Iacketta, conductor
- ESYO Concertino Strings - Leo Milman, conductor
- ESYO Concertino Wind Choir, Julie Taylor, conductor
- ESYO Concertino Brass Choir, Scott Hopkins, conductor
- ESYO Concertino Percussion, Jim Iacketta, conductor
- ESYO Melodies of Christmas Chorale, Michael Lister, conductor

== Programming ==
The youth orchestra is well known for its 30+ year participation in CBS 6’s Melodies of Christmas (benefit concerts for the Melodies Center for Childhood Cancer and Blood Disorders at the Children’s Hospital at Albany Medical Center). ESYO’s ensembles also give approximately 30 public performances a year. ESYO reaches out to the community with an annual free concert for senior citizens, concerts for young people, recitals in nursing homes, and performances at public events. In addition, the ensembles perform an annual "Playathon" fundraiser at Crossgates Mall in which they play for the entire day.

In May 2010, the youth orchestra performed for the first time at EMPAC at Rensselaer Polytechnic Institute in the grand finale concert of the Albany Symphony Orchestra's American Music Festival. Other ESYO ensembles routinely performed at the Massry Center for the Arts, The College of Saint Rose, before the college closed, as well as at area high schools. The Repertory Orchestra routinely performs with Albany Pro Musica at its annual High School Choral Festival.

In June 2011, ESYO won 2nd prize for Adventurous Programming (Youth Division) from ASCAP (American Society of Composer, Authors, and Publishers). The award was presented to Music Director Helen Cha-Pyo at the League of American Orchestra's annual conference in Minneapolis, Minnesota. This was the 3rd ASCAP award for ESYO; in June 2008, ESYO received 1st prize for Adventurous Programming (Youth Division) and the rarely presented Award for American Programming on Foreign Tours.

During June 2020, ESYO live streamed a three-day digital music festival titled "#SoundingTogether" among the COVID-19 pandemic. The campaign took at-home video from students and musicians and broadcast them in a virtual concert format. During Day 3 of the festival, ESYO unveiled the first ever 360° video At-Home Orchestra, which featured 125 musicians performing "Ay Caray", an original composition by Carlos Ágreda in a 3d environment.

== Touring ==
The ESYO Symphony Orchestra toured Portugal in 2016 and went to Slovakia, Austria, and the Czech Republic in 2025.

The youth orchestra embarked on a fifth international tour in the summer of 2012 after accepting an invitation to perform at the 2012 World Expo in Yeosu, South Korea. The orchestra also gave concerts in Beijing, Shanghai, and Seoul. Previous tours included traveling to Austria and Hungary in 1989, to Spain in 1994, to Germany and the Czech Republic in 2000, and to Germany, the Czech Republic, and Austria in 2008. In the summer of 2018 the ESYO Wind Orchestra embarked on an international tour for the first time, including Hungary. The Wind Orchestra will attend a wind band festival in Romania in April 2026.

The 2008 tour was particularly distinguished as the youth orchestra premiered American composer Samuel Adler's piece "A Bridge to Understanding" with Dr. Adler accompanying the orchestra on tour. "A Bridge to Understanding" was commissioned by ESYO for its youth orchestra to perform in a festival of new music in March 2008. During that festival, ESYO ensembles premiered nine pieces - one commissioned for each of ESYO's performing ensembles. The festival was funded in part by a $100,000 grant from New York State Music Fund at Rockefeller Philanthropy Advisors. A future tour will occur in July 2020 to Argentina and Uruguay.

== Outreach ==
In addition to its performing groups, in 2015 ESYO launched CHIME, an "El Sistema" based program. Through free, daily music instruction and mentorship, ESYO CHIME provides young musicians from poor communities comprehensive support at both the elementary and middle school levels.

ESYO provided free private lessons to poor students in Schenectady for nearly two decades, and in 2015, in partnership with the Schenectady City School District (SCSD), it launched a new access program called, Creating Harmony Invigorating Music Education—CHIME.

Beginning with a cohort of 30 children at Schenectady's Yates Arts in Education Magnet School, CHIME now serves more than 100 children at three Schenectady program sites with plans to add a fourth by 2020. In 2018 ESYO opened a Troy site
