= New Jersey State Youth Orchestra =

The New Jersey State Youth Orchestra (NJSYO) is a youth orchestra based in New Jersey, United States. It was established as an independent non-profit organization in Red Bank, NJ in 1977 after being founded in 1972 as a program of the New Jersey State Orchestra. The NJSYO is the oldest independent youth orchestra in continuous operation in New Jersey.

The NJSYO operates a variety of orchestral and ensemble music programs for young people which include public performance opportunities. The performance and educational programs offered include a symphonic youth orchestra, an intermediate string orchestra, a preparatory string orchestra, a chamber ensemble, and summer "bootcamp" programs in strings and woodwinds/brass. The NJSYO is currently in residence at the Middletown Arts Center in Middletown, NJ.

The current music director is Dorothy Sobieski, who is the recipient of the Art Scholarship Award from the Polish Ministry of Culture as well as numerous other awards for her performance work. In 1990 Sobieski toured Europe while performing as a member of the European Youth Orchestra under Yehudi Menuhin. She was preceded in this role by Ben Ringer, who was selected as the 2019 Outstanding Educator in Performing Arts by the Monmouth Arts Council for his work with the NJSYO. Previous music directors include Alexander Yudkovsky, executive director of The School for Strings, Roy D. Gussman, music director of the Monmouth Symphony Orchestra, Daniel Spalding, music director of Capital Philharmonic of New Jersey, and William Berz, director of the department of music at Rutgers University.
