= European Youth Music Festival =

Annual music festival in Europe

The European Youth Music Festival is a music festival held annually in Europe. The 9th festival in 2007 was held in Budapest, Hungary, the 10th to take place in Linz, Austria in 2009.
