= Orchestra America =

Orchestra America (OA) is a nonprofit organization that promotes orchestral high school music education through events and workshops. As a division of Bands of America it merged in 2006 with the "Music for All Foundation," which also sought to provide performance opportunities and musical education opportunities for schools and communities.

== Summer symposium ==
Orchestra America's first event was the Orchestra Track at Bands of America Summer Symposium. A week-long, workshop for string students. Emphasis is placed on leadership skills and building elements for the student to take back to his or her orchestra.

== Honor Orchestra of America ==
In 2005, the Honor Orchestra of America debuted with the Honor Band of America at the National Concert Band Festival. The honors ensemble was composed of high school string, wind, and percussion students from across the country. The group has since performed under the batons of Scott O'Neill (2005), Benjamin Zander (2006), Larry Livingston (2007, 2008, 2009, 2010, 2011, 2012) and Anthony Maiello (2010). The group has also shared the stage with guest soloists including Christopher O'Reilly (2006), Pinchas Zukerman (2007), Barnabas Kelemen (2008), and Shelly Berg (2009).

== Orchestra America National Festival ==
The Orchestra America National Festival debuted in 2006? with six full and string orchestras. The Festival is a part of the Music for All National Festival. Ensembles perform in a non-competitive setting to an audience of peers. The Festival is free and open to the public with concerts held at the Hilbert Circle Theatre, home of the Indianapolis Symphony Orchestra.

Orchestra America is an operating division of Music for All, Inc., a 501(c)(3) organization headquartered in Indianapolis, Indiana.
