= Arthur Nestrovski =

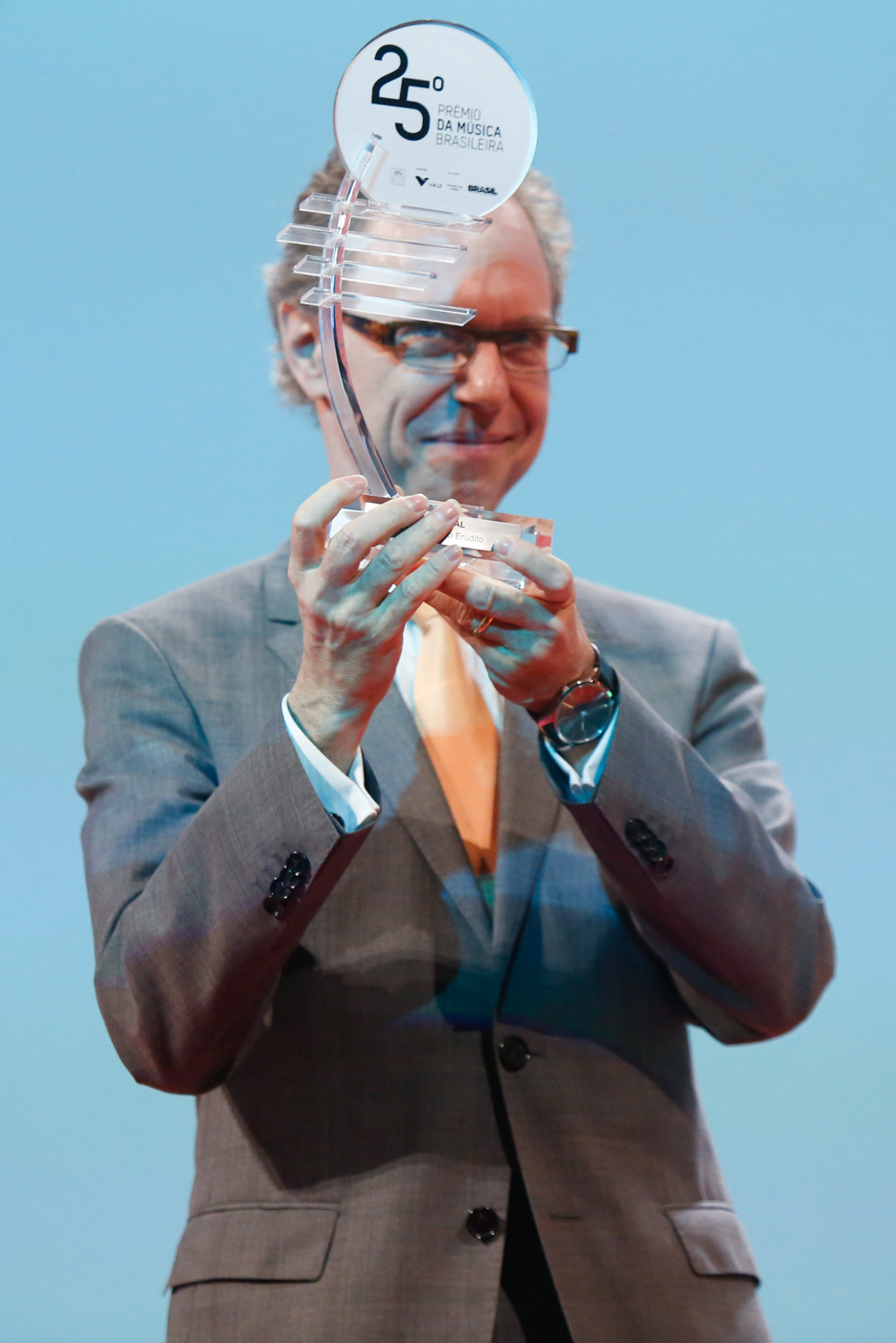
- Nestrovski during the 25th Prêmio da Música Brasileira, 2014
- Born: December 26, 1959 (age 66); Porto Alegre, Rio Grande do Sul, Brazil
- Education: University of York; University of Iowa
- Occupations: composer; guitarist; critic; writer; editor

Arthur Rosenblat Nestrovski (born December 26, 1959) is a Brazilian composer, guitarist, literary and musical critic, writer and editor. He was artistic director of the São Paulo State Symphony Orchestra (Osesp) from 2010 to 2022; and artistic director of the Campos do Jordão Festival from 2012 to 2022.

== Life and career ==
He graduated in Music from the University of York in 1983. He has a PhD in Literature and Music from the University of Iowa, USA, in 1990. From 1992 to 2009 he served as a classical music critic for the Folha de S.Paulo newspaper; and from 1999 to 2009 he was editor of PubliFolha. From 1991 to 2005 he was a professor in the postgraduate course in Communication and Semiotics at PUC / SP; he abandoned his university career to dedicate himself more intensively to music.

Since then he recorded the solo CDs Jobim Violão, Chico Violão, and "Violão Violão", the compositions album Tudo que Gira Parece a Felicidade and a compositions and arrangements album, Pra Que Chorar (with singer Celso Sim), among other projects, including the DVD O Fim da Canção- TatitWisnikNestrovski and in 2016 the CD Pós Você e Eu with his daughter, the singer Lívia Nestrovski, followed by the duo's "Sarabanda" (2020) and the solo guitar digital EP "Sarabandas" (2020). He performs regularly with artists such as Zé Miguel Wisnik, Zélia Duncan, Adriana Calcanhotto and Paula Morelenbaum, in Brazil and abroad (Germany, Portugal, Poland).

Renowned also as an author of children's books, he received the Jabuti Prize for Fiction Book of the Year, in 2003, for Bichos Que Existem e Bichos Que Não Existem.
