= Elgin Youth Symphony Orchestra =

U.S. musical group

Elgin Youth Symphony Orchestras
- Youth orchestra
- Short name: EYSO
- Founded: 1976
- Concert hall: Arts Center, Elgin Community College

Elgin Youth Symphony Orchestras (EYSO) is the oldest and largest youth orchestra program in northwest Illinois and is composed of three full orchestras, two string orchestras, a brass choir, two percussion ensembles, a flute choir, and a large Chamber Music Institute.

== Background ==
The EYSO is an in-residence ensemble in the Arts Center at Elgin Community College (ECC). In 2011, there were over 300 students in the EYSO programs, from 4th grade through college age, coming from more than 65 communities, from as far south as Aurora, Naperville, Orland Park, Oswego, and Yorkville, as far west as Rockford, as far east as Chicago and as far north as Belvidere.

The EYSO is a 501(c)(3) organization registered as a not-for-profit corporation with the State of Illinois.

=== Mission ===
The mission of the Elgin Youth Symphony Orchestra is to create a community of young musicians, enriching their lives and those of their families, schools, communities and beyond, through the study and performance of excellent music.

== Programs ==
=== Youth symphony ===
(Matthew Sheppard, conductor)

For very advanced high school and college-age students, plays standard symphonic repertoire. Studies major works such as Shostakovich Symphony No. 5, Mahler Symphony No. 1, Rachmaninoff Symphony No. 2, Revueltas’ Sensemayà, Gershwin's Rhapsody in Blue, the Debussy Nocturnes, Respighi Pines of Rome, Rimsky-Korsakov's Scheherazade, Bernstein's On the Waterfront, and many works by contemporary composers.

=== Philharmonia ===
(Aaron Kaplan, conductor)

Philharmonia is an advanced level full orchestra for middle and high school players, performing challenging repertoire, while refining orchestral technique. Recent repertoire includes William Walton's Hamlet, A London Symphony IV, and Dvorak's Slavonic Dance. 8 Op. 46

=== Sinfonia ===
(Greg Schwaegler, conductor)

An intermediate-level full orchestra for middle and high school players, introduced in 2010–11, to provide an introduction to the full symphony orchestra for younger or less experienced wind, brass, and string players.

=== Prelude Orchestra ===
(Amy Lestina Tonaki, conductor)

For early-intermediate string players grades 4–9, to refine basic orchestral playing skills and string techniques. Prelude Orchestra has commissioned several original works for young string orchestra, including Westward Journey and Jubilee by Carrie Lane Gruselle.

=== Primo Orchestra ===
(Tracy Dullea, conductor)

For entry-level string players, providing young musicians with their first orchestral experience, focusing on playing technique, sight-reading, scales, and auditioning skills. Primo members receive more individual attention and mentoring than is usually possible in a large orchestral setting.

=== Brass choir ===
(Dan Sartori, conductor)

A program for brass and percussion players from youth symphony and Philharmonia. The brass choir performs in all three EYSO season concerts, and also presents its own spring concert and masterclass, featuring prominent brass guest artists such as Fulcrum Point New Music Ensemble and the Wisconsin Brass Quintet.

=== Flute choir ===
(Ruth Cavanaugh, conductor)

A program for flute players in Sinfonia and Philharmonia, as well as players outside of the two programs. Flute choir takes part in all three EYSO concerts. The flute choir includes C flutes, piccolo, alto flute, bass flute, as well as on occasion contrabass flute.

=== Chamber Music Institute ===
(Matthew Sheppard, director)

Offers opportunities to perform in trios, quartets, or quintets or other combinations, studying the wealth of music written for chamber ensembles. Players learn independence as soloists within the supportive environment of a small group, under the guidance of professional artist musicians who serve as coaches. Typically about one-third of EYSO students also participate in the CMI.

=== Honors Chamber Groups ===
The Maud Powell String Quartet, Hanson String Quartet, Honors Flute Trio, and Sterling Brass Quintet are selected by competitive audition as honors groups within the Chamber Music Institute. They work with members of the Pacifica Quartet, the Wisconsin Brass Quintet, Rachel Barton Pine, the Pro Arte Quartet, and other world-class coaches, many drawn from the Chicago Symphony Orchestra.

== Performances ==
The EYSO regular season includes performances by all ensembles in the Blizzard Theatre at Elgin Community College. Chamber Music Institute members present concerts each semester as well as ongoing performances throughout the Chicago area. Through the Elgin Symphony Orchestra's Masterclass Series, many EYSO members work with guest artists like Alicia Weilerstein, Inon Barnatan, Jaimie Laredo and Jennifer Frautschi.

The EYSO Youth Symphony has appeared with Midori, Ted Atkatz and the Chicago band NYCO, the cast of The Jersey Boys, and on NPR’s radio show From the Top. It has also performed at the Ravinia Festival in Chicago and was featured at the 2006 Aberdeen International Festival in Scotland. Members of the EYSO have performed with a wide range of musical artists including Yo Yo Ma and the Silk Road Ensemble, violinist Isabella Lippi, and soprano Kitt Reuter Foss. The EYSO regularly commissions and premieres new works for orchestra by contemporary composers.

== Notable achievements ==
=== Awards ===
- 2022 Matthew Sheppard - Conductor of the Year (Illinois Council of Orchestras - ICO)
- 2022 Programming of the Year (ICO)
- 2021 Youth Orchestra of the Year (ICO)
- 2015 Programming of the Year Award (ICO)
- 2008 Randal Swiggum - Conductor of the Year (ICO)
- 2007 Youth Orchestra of the Year (ICO)
- 2005 Programming of the Year Award (ICO)
- 2001 City of Elgin Image Award
- 2000 Youth Orchestra of the Year (ICO)
- 2000 Marketing Program of the Year (ICO)

=== Accomplishments ===
- 2011 Daniel Boico, assistant conductor of the New York Philharmonic (and former EYSO conductor) conducted philharmonia and youth symphony in a weeklong residency and concert. Featured works included Chabrier's Espana and Rachmaninoff's Symphony No. 2.
- 2010 EYSO members accompanied Michael Ingersoll and cast members from Jersey Boys in four performances of "Under the Streetlight".
- 2010 Maud Powell String Quartet featured on Chicago classical music radio WFMT's "Introductions".
- 2009 Youth Symphony featured on WFMT's "Introductions".
- 2008 Performed with famed international violinist Midori in a 5-day residency program including concerts, master classes, workshops, arts advocacy visits, meals with Q & A sessions, and discussion groups.
- 2008 Played with independent Chicago rock band NYCO
- 2007 Youth Symphony members perform with Yo-Yo Ma and the Silk Road Ensemble in Symphony Center
- 2006 Youth Symphony was the featured orchestra at the Aberdeen International Youth Festival in Scotland.
- 2006 Youth Symphony featured on NPR's From The Top.
- 2004 Invited to perform at Ravinia Park - the first youth orchestra ever to perform at the Ravinia Festival.

== Affiliations ==
- Illinois Council of Orchestras Member
- League of American Orchestras Member
