= The Young Artists Orchestra of Las Vegas =

American youth orchestra

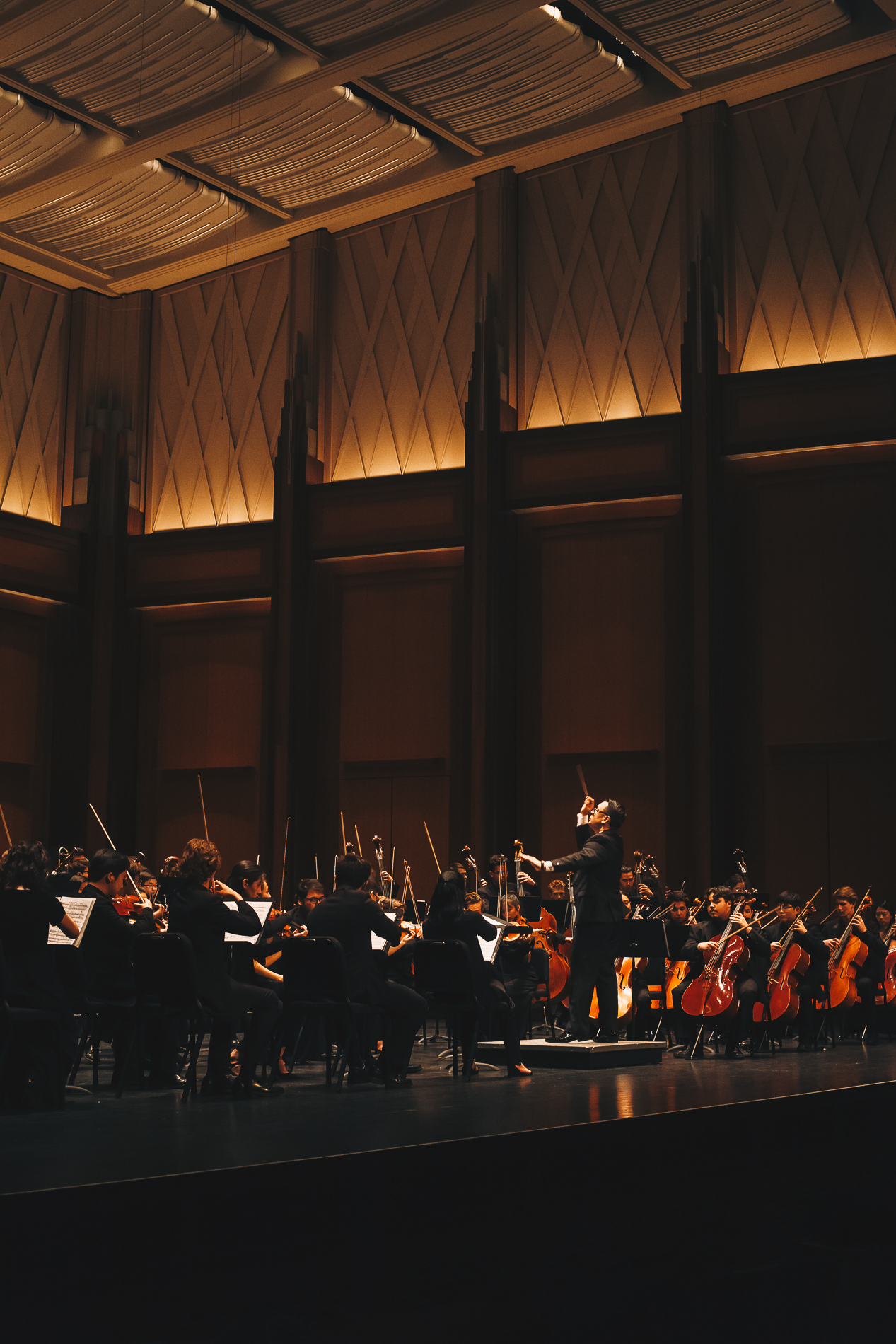
- A performance at the Smith Center for the Performing Arts in Las Vegas, Nevada

Background information
- Also known as: The Dr. Shirley Linzy Young Artists Orchestra, The Las Vegas Young Artists Orchestra
- Origin: Las Vegas, Nevada, United States
- Genres: Classical, world, contemporary classic
- Occupation: Youth Symphony Orchestra
- Years active: 2015–present
- Members: Executive Director; Yunior Lopez; Music Director; Yunior Lopez; Academy Conductor; Kerry Bennett
- Website: www.lvyao.org

The Young Artists Orchestra of Las Vegas, (YAO) also known as The Dr. Shirley Linzy Young Artists Orchestra of Las Vegas and The Las Vegas Young Artists Orchestra, is a tuition-free & professional training youth orchestra founded by violist and conductor Yunior Lopez in 2015 in Las Vegas, Nevada. The YAO consists of three primary ensembles with nearly 150 students and young professionals up to age 22.

== Activities ==
The members rehearse weekly at Maryland Square and are regularly coached by leading local professionals with backgrounds from The Juilliard School, The Royal Conservatory of Music, and Eastman School of Music, to name a few. In addition, members have the opportunity to work with many renowned musicians in the classical, hip-hop, and world music fields. The program is led by founding Executive & Music Director Yunior Lopez who previously served as conductor of the Academy Symphony Orchestra at Toronto's Royal Conservatory of Music. The YAO performs over fifteen concerts & events per season including "outreach concerts".

Both new and returning student members are required to audition annually. Acceptance and orchestra placement is a competitive, merit-based process in which students & young professionals must meet requirements for consideration.

== Past concerts ==
The YAO is one of the largest presenters of performing arts programming in the state of Nevada. It typically performs over fifteen concerts & events each season. Most concerts are usually held at the Windmill Library Performing Arts Center operated by Las Vegas–Clark County Library District and the Smith Center for the Performing Arts. The YAO also presents community outreach concerts, in which the group travels to a nearby venue to perform for local kids and community members. Many of these outreach concerts are held at the local libraries.

== Unique programs and commissions ==
The YAO presents many unique programs and collaborations to its members and general public. In 2017 and 2018 the YAO collaborated with local funky hip-hop/jazz band from Las Vegas, The Lique, by performing their albums backed by a full symphony orchestra. During the 2020/21 season music director, Yunior Lopez, created the One Night in Havana project with Cuban singer Noybel Gorgoy. The project orchestrated revived music by Buena Vista Social Club and pre-revolution Cuban music with arrangement and orchestras by famed Cuban pianist Hilario Durán, Roberto Occhipinti, Yunior Lopez, and Arturo Hernandez. The project premiered on September 21, 2019, and was performed at the Cox Performing Arts Center in St. George, Utah on November 2, 2019.

=== Premieres ===
The YAO led the United States premier of "Rebrith" for Viola and Orchestra by Juno Award-winning Greek-Canadian composer Christos Hatzis featuring world famous Canadian violist Steven Dann.

=== Repertoire ===
The YAO typically performs classical works. In the past, the group has performed pieces & full symphonic works by Mozart, Beethoven, Brahms, Tchaikovsky, Shostakovich, Mahler, and many others.

== Ensembles ==
- YAO Symphony Orchestra - A full orchestra for advanced students & young professionals (ages 13–22) of difficult orchestral literature.
- YAO Chamber Orchestra - A professional level chamber symphony for young and established professionals through side-by-side collaboration.
- YAO Academy Orchestra - A string orchestra and at times full orchestra for intermediate students (ages 11–18) of orchestral literature.
- YAO Percussion Ensemble - A percussion ensemble for students & young professionals (ages 11–22) of difficult percussive literature.

== Name changes ==
The YAO was founded in 2015 as the Las Vegas Young Artists Orchestra. In October 2017, the YAO was renamed to honor one of its early supporters Dr. Shirley Linzy who was the Director and Supervising Nurse at the Adelson Clinic in Las Vegas. The YAO was renamed to The Dr. Shirley Linzy Young Artists Orchestra of Las Vegas.
