= Denver Young Artists Orchestra =

American youth orchestra

The Denver Young Artists Orchestra Association (DYAO) is one of the leading youth orchestras in the United States today. It was founded in 1977 by Betty Naster and Carl Topilow in Denver, Colorado. The orchestra maintains a close relationship with the Colorado Symphony Orchestra. Membership is by audition and is limited to musicians aged 8 to 23. Concerts take place in several concert halls in the greater Denver Metro Area including Boettcher Concert Hall, Gates Hall at the University of Denver's Newman Center for the Performing Arts, and Macky Auditorium in Boulder.

The Denver Young Artists Orchestra includes three ensembles: the original orchestra, known simply as DYAO, and two training ensembles: one Conservatory Orchestra and one String Ensemble. Auditions take place every spring.

DYAO has performed with many prominent soloists over the years, including Wendy Warner, Antonio Pompa-Baldi, and Edgar Meyer. In addition, DYAO has toured internationally several times, to various regions around the world, including Europe and South America. In the summer of 2014, DYAO went on a tour to Italy, France, and Spain.

Many alumni of the DYAO go on to play as professional musicians in well-known orchestras.
