= Eleazar de Carvalho =

Brazilian conductor and composer (1912–1996)

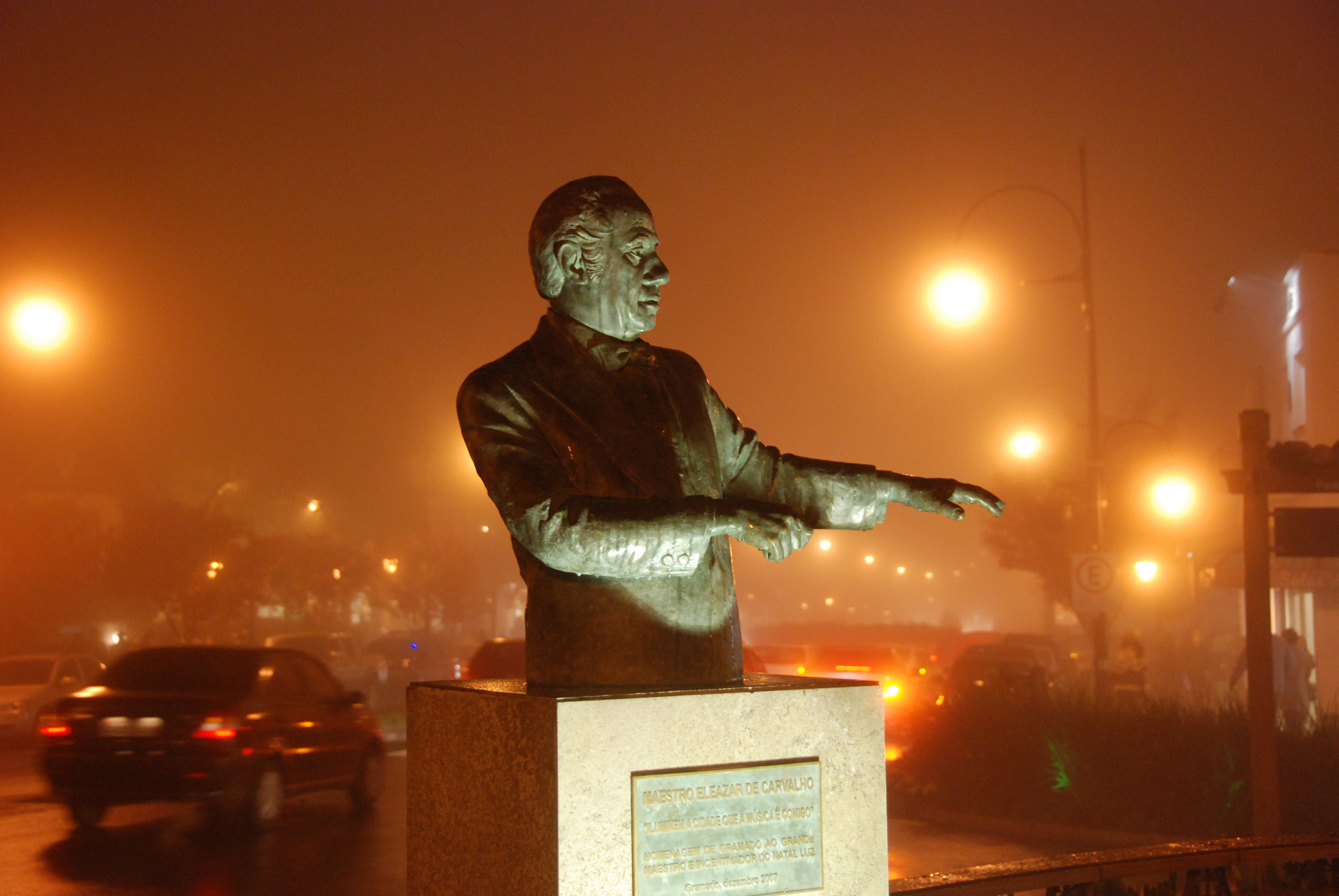
- Bust of de Carvalho in Gramado
- Born: 28 June 1912; Iguatu, Ceará, Brazil
- Died: 12 September 1996 (aged 84); São Paulo, Brazil
- Occupations: Conductor; pedagogue

Eleazar de Carvalho (28 June 1912 – 12 September 1996) was a Brazilian conductor and composer.

== Biography ==
De Carvalho's parents were Manuel Afonso de Carvalho and Dalila Mendonça. He studied in the United States with Serge Koussevitzky at the Berkshire Music Center, and later became a conducting assistant to Koussevitzky, at the same time as Leonard Bernstein. He received a Ph.D. in music from Washington State University in 1963.

In Brazil, de Carvalho held principal conducting positions with the Orquestra Sinfônica Brasileira of Rio de Janeiro, Orquestra Sinfônica do Estado de São Paulo, Orquestra Sinfônica do Recife, Orquestra Sinfônica da Paraiba and also with the Orquestra Sinfônica de Porto Alegre. In the United States, his major post was as music director of the St. Louis Symphony Orchestra (SLSO), from 1963 to 1968. During his St. Louis tenure, he was noted as a champion of contemporary music. He also conducted the first SLSO performances of Igor Stravinsky's The Rite of Spring, Ludwig van Beethoven's Missa solemnis, and the Grande messe des morts of Hector Berlioz.

De Carvalho taught at Hofstra University and the Juilliard School of Music. In 1987, he joined the music faculty of Yale University as a professor and as conductor-in-residence. He became emeritus at Yale in 1994. De Carvalho was a teacher to such conductors as Claudio Abbado, Charles Dutoit, Zubin Mehta, Gustav Meier, Seiji Ozawa, José Serebrier, and David Zinman.

De Carvalho was married to Jocy de Oliveira, and had a son, Eleazar de Carvalho Filho, now an economist. Later, he remarried, to Sonia Muniz de Carvalho. They had a son, Sergei and a daughter, Claudia.
