= São Paulo State Symphony Orchestra =

Brazilian symphony orchestra

- Orchestra
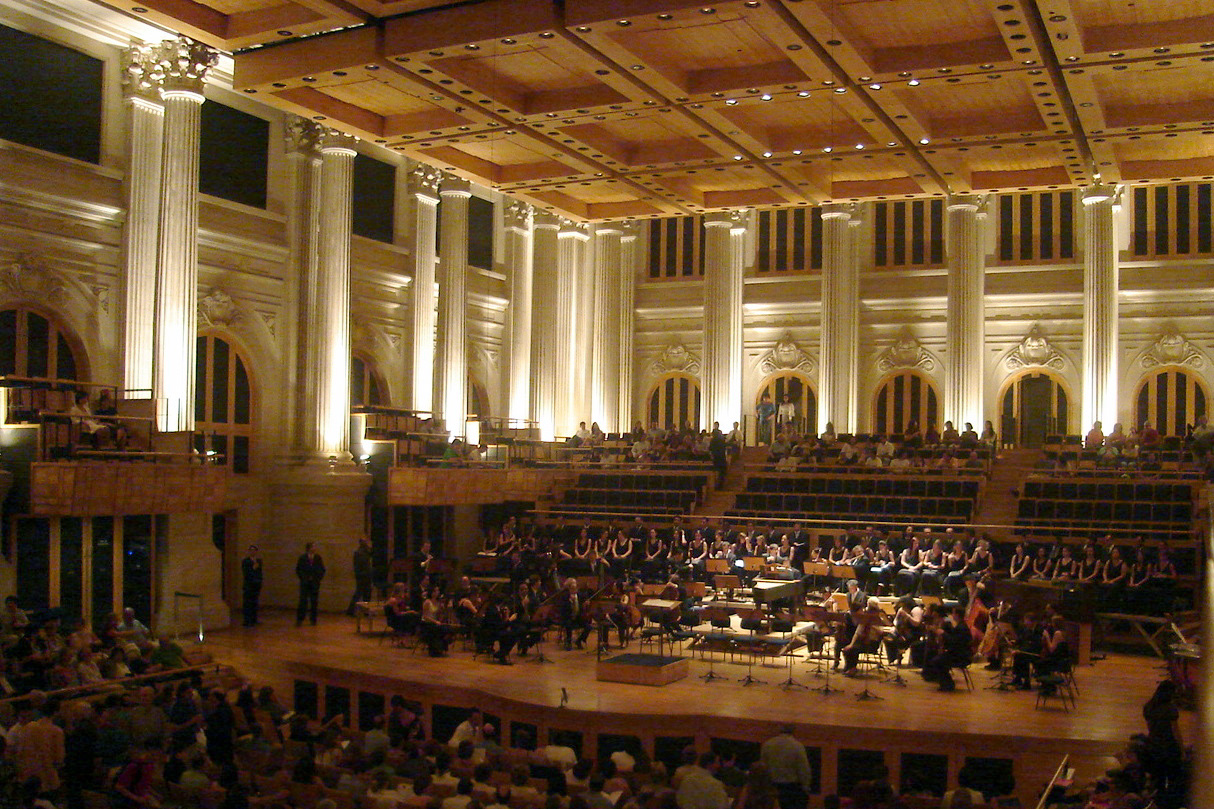
- Sala São Paulo
- Native name: Orquestra Sinfônica do Estado de São Paulo, OSESP
- Founded: 1954
- Location: São Paulo, Brazil
- Website: www.osesp.art.br

The São Paulo State Symphony Orchestra (Portuguese: Orquestra Sinfônica do Estado de São Paulo, OSESP) is a Brazilian orchestra based in São Paulo. The principal concert venue of OSESP is the Sala São Paulo.

== History ==
The orchestra, initially called the Orquestra Sinfônica Estadual (State Symphony Orchestra), gave its first concert on 18 July 1953 at the Municipal Theatre of São Paulo, conducted by João de Sousa Lima. The government of the State of São Paulo officially codified the establishment of the orchestra in a decree (Law No. 2733) dated 13 September 1954, signed by Governor Lucas Nogueira Garcez.

Sousa Lima served as the orchestra's first principal conductor and artistic director. OSESP alternated between periods of success and great difficulty, including a hiatus in its activities. In 1964, the Italian conductor Bruno Roccela became principal conductor. In 1972, Eleazar de Carvalho succeeded Roccela, and served as principal conductor until his death in 1996. In 1978, the orchestra formally took on its current name of the Orquestra Sinfônica do Estado de São Paulo. On March 14, 1988, while performing the Brazilian National Anthem, the choir collapsed while the orchestra is performing the anthem in Americana Lyric Theater.

John Neschling became principal conductor of OSESP in 1997. One condition that Neschling set for signing his contract was the establishment of a permanent home for OSESP. In 1999, the orchestra took up residence in a newly renovated venue located in the spaces of the abandoned Júlio Prestes Station, the Sala São Paulo. In 2005, the OSESP Foundation, a non-profit organization presided by former President of Brazil Fernando Henrique Cardoso, took over operations of OSESP. In January 2009, following reports of conflicts between Neschling and the OSESP governing board and musicians, OSESP rescinded Neschling's contract, with immediate effect.

Yan Pascal Tortelier served as principal conductor from 2009 to 2011, and subsequently as principal guest conductor from 2011 to 2013. From January 2010, music scholar and writer Arthur Nestrovski was named Artistic Director, in charge of programming, educational activities, publications and outreach programs. In February 2011, OSESP announced the appointment of Marin Alsop as principal conductor, the first female conductor named to the post, with an initial contract of five years, effective in 2012. In August 2012, under the direction of Alsop, OSESP made its first-ever appearance at the Proms, the first Proms appearance by any Brazilian orchestra. In July 2013, OSESP granted Alsop the title of music director. In April 2015, OSESP extended her contract to the end of 2019. In December 2017, OSESP announced that Alsop is to stand down as its chief conductor in December 2019, and subsequently to take the title of honorary conductor.

In October 2016, Thierry Fischer first guest-conducted OSESP. In June 2019, OSESP announced the appointment of Fischer as its next music director, effective in 2020, with an initial contract through 2024. In November 2022, OSESP announced the extension of Fischer's contract to 2027.

== Recordings ==
The orchestra has made commercial recordings for such labels as Biscoito Fino, BIS, and Naxos. These albums include symphonies of Camargo Guarnieri, Francisco Braga's opera Jupyra, works by Francisco Mignone and Cláudio Santoro, and Heitor Villa-Lobos's complete symphonies, Bachianas Brasileiras and Chôros. With Alsop, OSESP has recorded commercially music of Prokofiev.

== Principal conductors ==
- João de Sousa Lima (1954–1964)
- Bruno Roccela (1964–1972)
- Eleazar de Carvalho (1972–1996)
- John Neschling (1997–2009)
- Yan Pascal Tortelier (2009–2011)
- Marin Alsop (2012–2019)
- Thierry Fischer (2020–present)
