= Milwaukee Youth Symphony Orchestra =

The Milwaukee Youth Symphony Orchestra (MYSO) was founded in 1956 and has grown from one orchestra and 30 students to become the largest after-school youth orchestra in the country. The organization serves 1,000 young musicians who come from more than 200 schools, 60 communities, and as many as 14 counties throughout southeastern Wisconsin and northern Illinois. MYSO reaches an audience of 25,000 annually through more than 100 performances.

MYSO offers more than 40 ensemble and supplemental programs, ranging from symphony and string orchestras, and jazz and steel bands to music theory, composition, and international tours.

MYSO is a founding member of the United Performing Arts Fund and is a 501(c)(3) non-profit organization.
