= Young Euro Classic =

International youth orchestra festival

- Genre: Classical music
- Locations: Berlin, Germany
- Years active: 2000–present
- Website: young-euro-classic.de

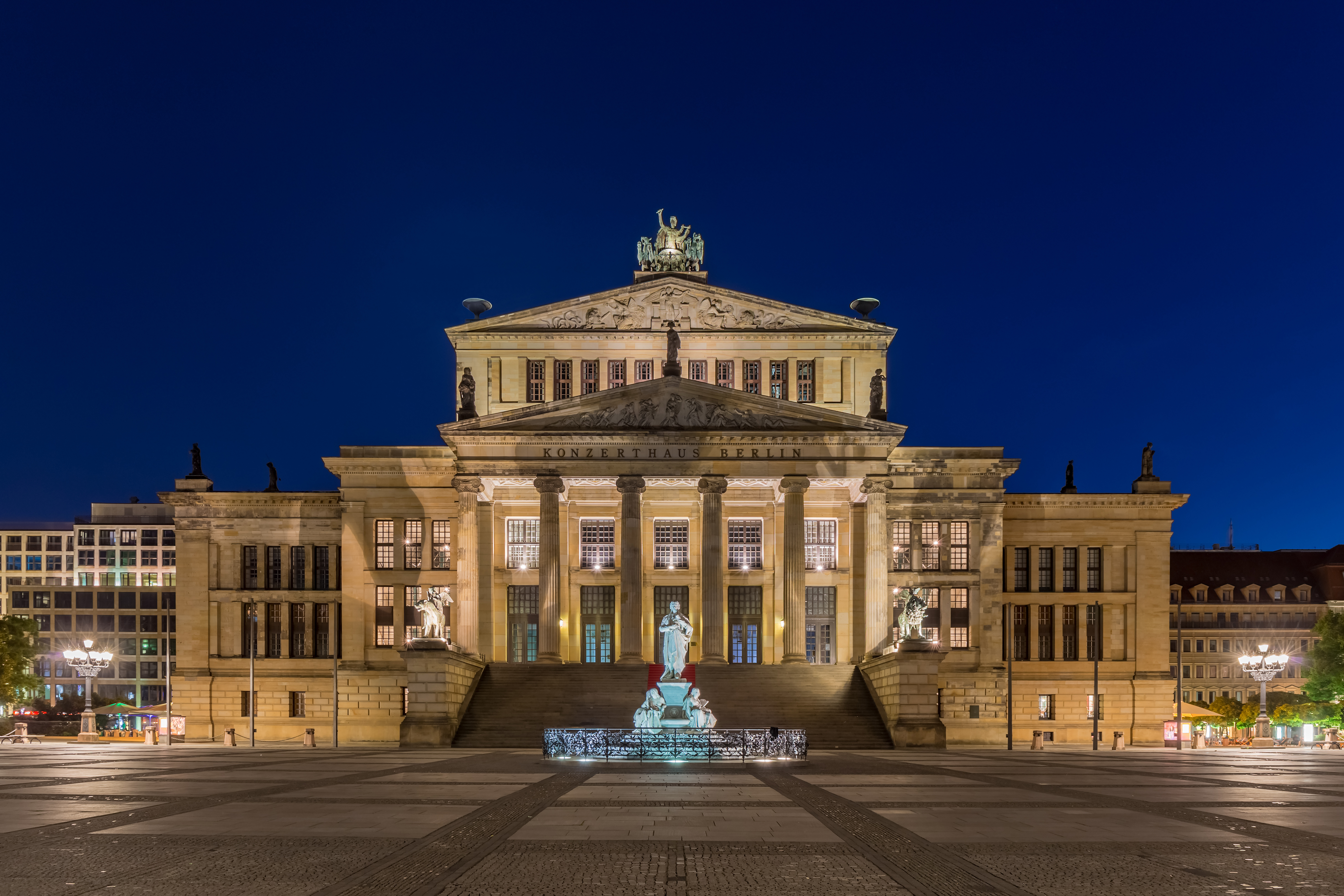
The Konzerthaus Berlin (2015)

Young Euro Classic is an international music festival for youth orchestras. Established in Berlin, Germany in 2000, it is one of the world's most important international platforms for young musicians in the Western classical music tradition. Every summer, orchestras from all over the world perform at the Konzerthaus Berlin.

The festival is an associated member organization of the European Federation of National Youth Orchestras.

== History ==
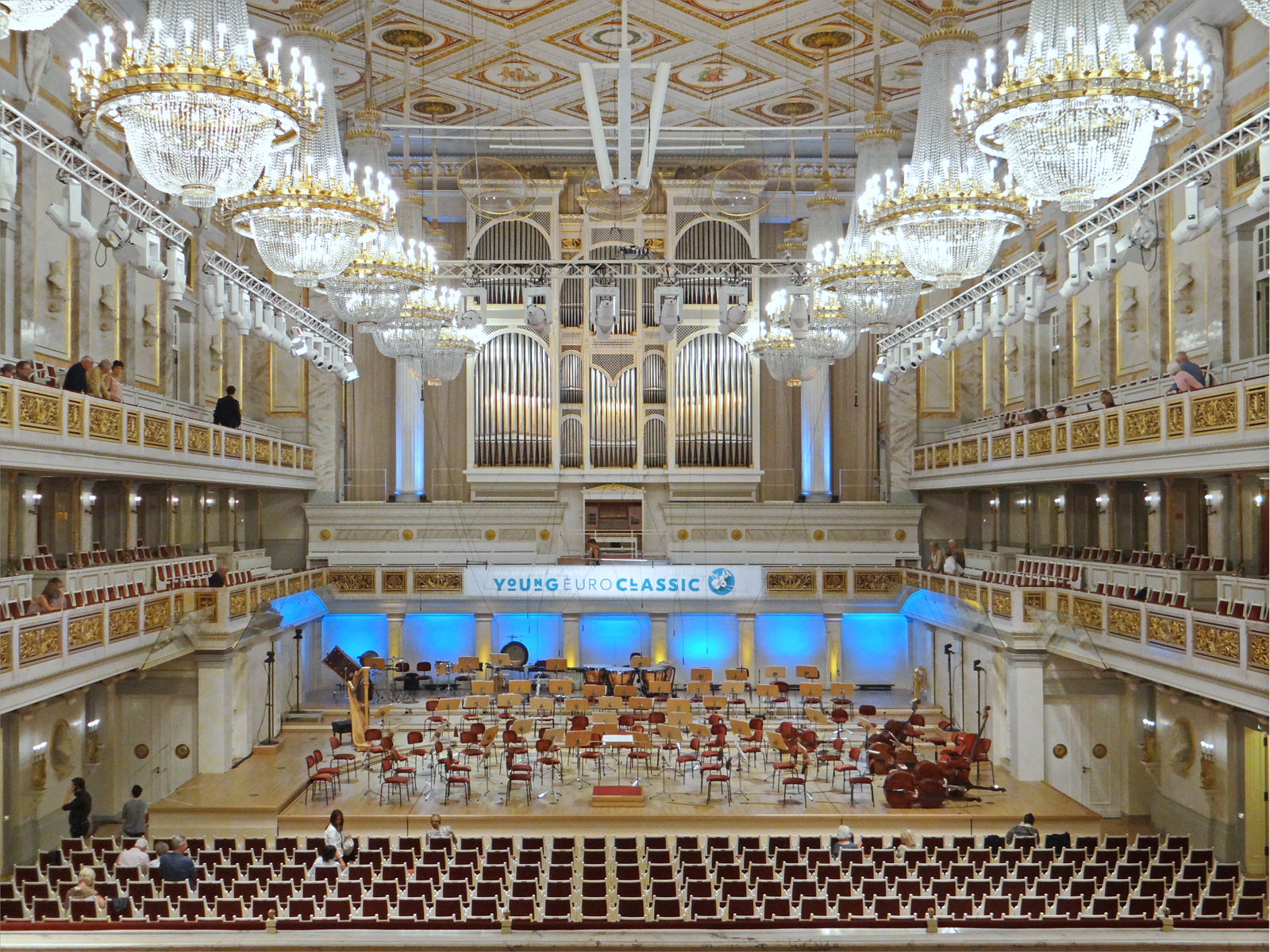
The interior of the Konzerthaus Berlin during Young Euro Classic 2017

=== 2021 ===
Young Euro Classic 2021 was held from July 30 to August 15.

- Young Euro Classic Orchestra Germany–France (in cooperation with the Bundesjugendorchester and the Orchestre Français des Jeunes)
- (Germany) Bundesjugendballett
- (Greece) Greek Youth Symphony Orchestra
- Ensemble Mini (replacing the Portuguese Youth Orchestra)
- c/o chamber orchestra (replacing the Spanish National Youth Orchestra)
- (Austria) Wiener Jeunesse Orchester
- (Germany) Bundesjugendorchester
- National Youth Orchestra of Romania
- (Sweden) O/Modernt New Generation Orchestra
- (Germany) (France) German-French Junior Academy
- Schleswig-Holstein Festival Orchestra
- LGT Young Soloists
- (Russia) (Germany) Russian German Music Academy (replacing the Chelyabinsk Symphony Orchestra)
- Moritzburg Festival Orchestra
- (Cuba) Orquesta del Lyceum de La Habana

=== 2020 ===
Due to the COVID-19 pandemic, Young Euro Classic 2020 was held from August 1 to August 10 in a reduced chamber music format. Concerts were broadcast online.

=== 2019 ===
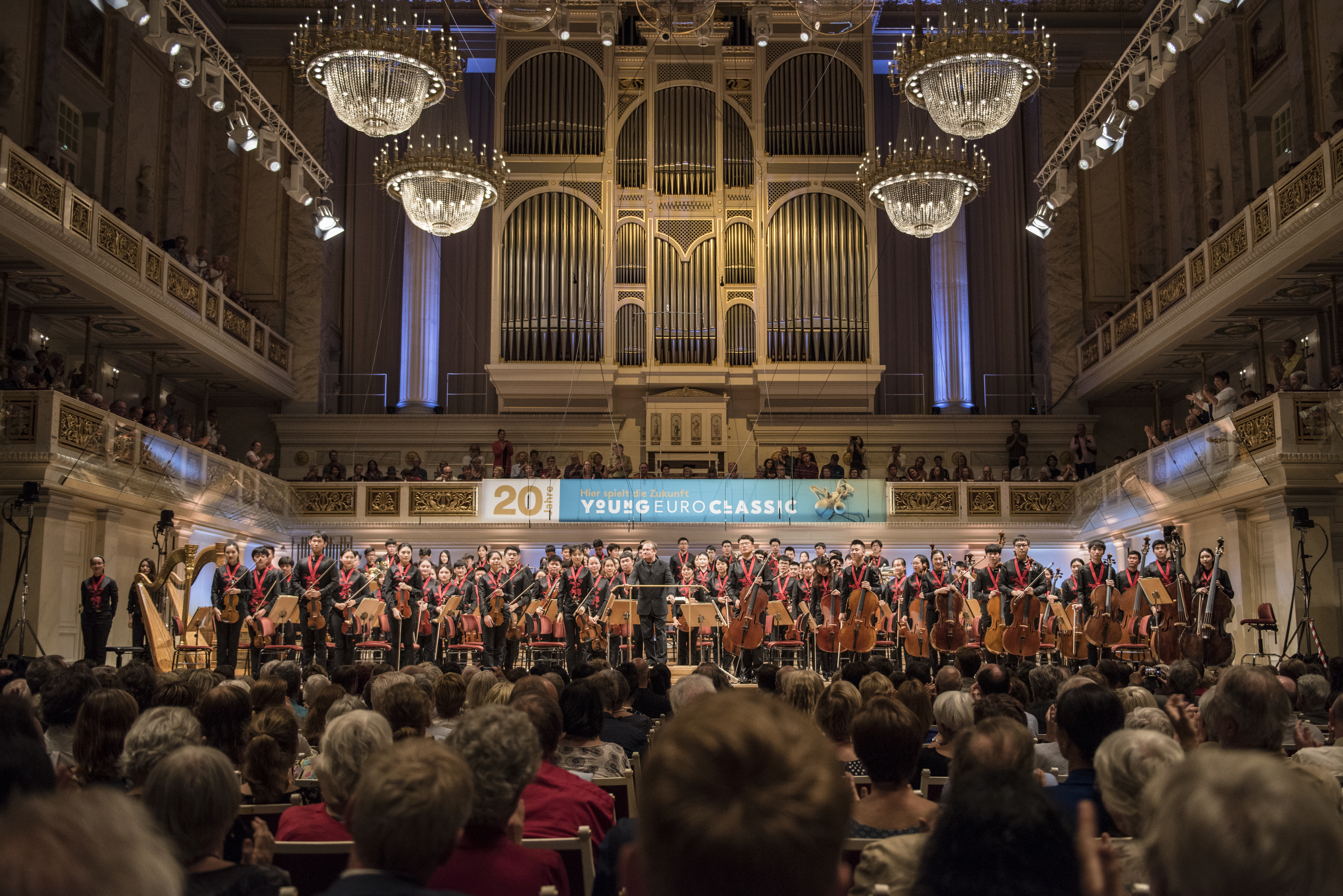
The National Youth Orchestra of China with Ludovic Morlot debuting at Young Euro Classic on August 5, 2019

Young Euro Classic 2019 was held from July 19 to August 6. It was the most high-profile festival to-date, with the national youth orchestras of China, the United Kingdom, Germany, the European Union, and the United States performing.

- (Poland) Polish Sinfonia Iuventus Orchestra
- (Russia) (Germany) International Tatarstan Youth Orchestra
- National Youth Symphony Orchestra of the Dominican Republic
- (Romania) Romanian Youth Orchestra
- (Sweden) O/Modernt Chamber Orchestra
- (Turkey) Turkish National Youth Philharmonic Orchestra
- (Portugal) Portuguese Youth Orchestra
- (Slovakia) Slovak Youth Orchestra
- National Youth Symphony Orchestra of Chile
- (Germany) Bundesjugendballett
- (Israel) (Palestine) Galilee Chamber Orchestra
- (United Kingdom) National Youth Orchestra of Great Britain
- European Union Youth Orchestra
- (Germany) Bundesjugendorchester
- National Youth Orchestra of China
- National Youth Orchestra of the United States of America

=== 2018 ===
Young Euro Classic 2018 was held from August 2 to August 20.

- (United States) Boston Philharmonic Youth Orchestra
- (South Africa) MIAGI Youth Orchestra
- (Germany) Bundesjugendorchester
- (Spain) Spanish National Youth Orchestra
- (Germany) Bundesjugendballett
- (Slovenia) Ljubljana Academy of Music Symphony Orchestra
- National Youth Orchestra of Canada
- (Romania) Romanian Youth Orchestra
- (United States) NYO Jazz
- National Youth Orchestra of the Netherlands
- (Russia) Youth Chamber Orchestra St. Petersburg
- (Norway) Ungdomssymfonikerne
- European Union Youth Orchestra
- Southbank Sinfonia
- Youth Symphony Orchestra of Ukraine
- (Georgia (country)) Georgian Sinfonietta
- (New Zealand) Auckland Youth Orchestra
- Schleswig-Holstein Musik Festival Orchestra

=== 2017 ===
Young Euro Classic 2017 was held from August 17 to September 3.

- (Colombia) Colombian Youth Philharmonic
- Schleswig-Holstein Musik Festival Orchestra
- (Germany) Bundesjugendballett
- (Germany) Bundesjugendorchester
- (Sweden) O/Modernt Chamber Orchestra
- (Russia) International Tchaikovsky Youth Orchestra Yekaterinburg
- (European Union) Baltic Sea Philharmonic
- (Japan) Elisabeth University of Music Choir and Orchestra
- (Moldova) Moldovan National Youth Orchestra
- (Turkey) Turkish National Youth Philharmonic Orchestra
- Asian Youth Orchestra
- (European Union) Gustav Mahler Jugendorchester
- (Portugal) Portuguese Youth Orchestra
- (France) Orchestre Français des Jeunes
- (Cuba) (European Union) Cuban-European Youth Orchestra

=== 2016 ===
Young Euro Classic 2016 was held from August 17 to September 3.

- European Union Youth Orchestra
- (Germany) Bundesjugendballett
- (Norway) Ungdomssymfonikerne
- (Latvia) Jāzeps Vītols Latvian Academy of Music Orchestra
- Schleswig-Holstein Musik Festival Orchestra
- (Germany) Bundesjugendorchester
- (Kazakhstan) Kazakh National Academy of Arts Orchestra
- National Youth Orchestra of the Netherlands
- Romania-Moldova Youth Orchestra
- (Bulgaria) Bulgarian National Youth Orchestra "Pioneer"
- (European Union) Gustav Mahler Jugendorchester
- (Russia) Urals Mussorgsky State Conservatoire Orchestra
- Arab Youth Philharmonic Orchestra
- (Estonia) Estonian Academy of Music and Theatre Orchestra
- (Germany) Deutsche Streicherphilharmonie
- (Mexico) Orquesta Sinfónica "Estanislao Mejía"
- (France) Orchestre Français des Jeunes

=== 2015 ===
Young Euro Classic 2015 was held from August 6 to August 23.

- (Israel) (Germany) Young Philharmonic Orchestra Jerusalem Weimar
- (Germany) Bundesjugendballett
- (Sweden) O/Modernt Chamber Orchestra
- (Germany) Bundesjugendorchester
- (United Kingdom) National Youth Orchestra of Great Britain
- (Portugal) Portuguese Youth Orchestra
- (Norway) Ungdomssymfonikerne
- (Ukraine) Kyiv Conservatory Symphony Orchestra
- (China) Guangzhou Symphony Youth Orchestra
- (Turkey) Turkish National Youth Philharmonic Orchestra
- National Youth Orchestra of the Netherlands
- I, Culture Orchestra
- (Georgia (country)) New Georgian Philharmonic
- Young Euro Classic Peace Orchestra

=== 2014 ===
Young Euro Classic 2014 was held from June 22 to June 29 and from August 8 to August 17.

- (France) Orchestre Français des Jeunes
- (Russia) All-Russian Youth Orchestra
- (Romania) Romanian Youth Orchestra
- (China) Orchestra of the Central Conservatory of Music
- (South Africa) MIAGI Youth Orchestra
- (Spain) Spanish National Youth Orchestra
- (Germany) Bundesjugendorchester
- (Germany) Junge Deutsche Philharmonie
- (Netherlands) NJO Sinfonietta and Dutch National Opera Academy
- Schleswig-Holstein Musik Festival Orchestra

== Awards ==
In 2008, Gabriele Minz, director of Young Euro Classic, was awarded the Order of Merit of Berlin.

In 2015, Young Euro Classic secured the title European Culture Brand of 2015.

In 2016, the Israeli Embassy in Berlin awarded Young Euro Classic with a medal for services to bilateral relations.
