= Vincent Accettola =

American producer and arts administrator (born 1994)

- Education: Yale University (BS); Harvard University (EdM)
- Occupation: Managing Director of the National Youth Orchestra of China

Vincent Accettola (born 1994) is an American producer and arts administrator who served as Managing Director of the National Youth Orchestra of China.

== Career ==
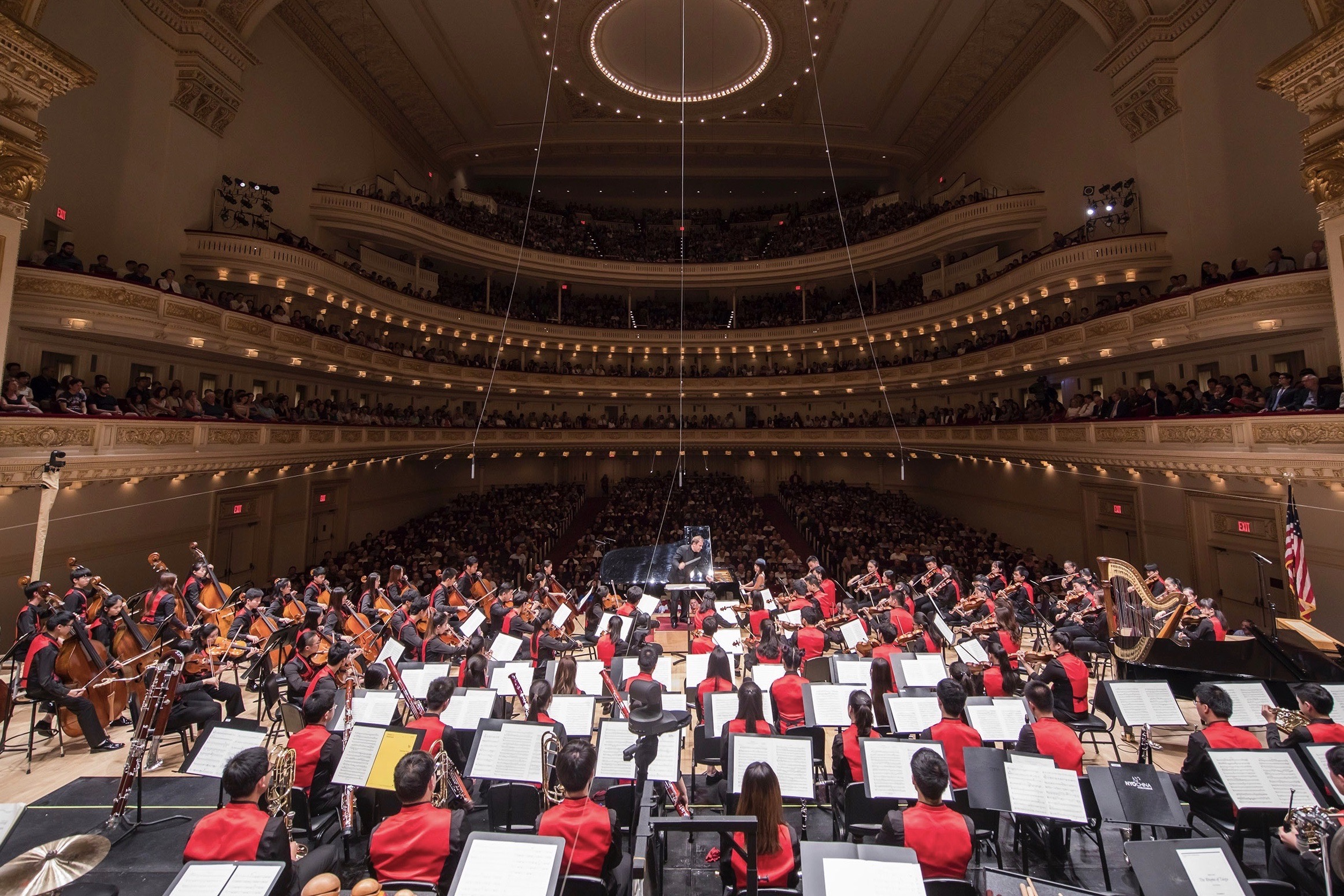
The National Youth Orchestra of China at Carnegie Hall with Yuja Wang.

As a senior at Yale University, Accettola collaborated with his roommate Owen Brown to create the National Youth Orchestra of China (NYO-China), a music festival modeled closely after the National Youth Orchestra of the United States of America (NYO-USA) with an annual residency and concert tour featuring over one hundred of the country's most outstanding young musicians.

With the support of Carnegie Hall and the Yale School of Music, Accettola and Brown launched the first season of NYO-China in 2017 with a sold-out concert at Carnegie Hall headlined by pianist Yuja Wang and conducted by Music Director of the Seattle Symphony Ludovic Morlot. The National Youth Orchestra of China since went on to become the premier youth ensemble in the country, having achieved critical acclaim in The New York Times, People’s Daily, and Der Tagesspiegel.

In his capacity as Managing Director of NYO-China, Accettola produced several live and recorded broadcasts of the orchestra for NPR, Medici.tv, ARTE, and CCTV. He also produced and co-directed the documentary 中国特色交响乐团: Orchestra with Chinese Characteristics alongside Academy Award-nominated filmmaker Christine Choy.
