= Pedro Carneiro =

Pedro Carneiro may refer to:

- Pedro Carneiro (musician) (born 1975), Portuguese musician
- Pedro Carneiro (footballer) (born 1997), Portuguese footballer who played as a midfielder
