= Orquesta Sinfónica Nacional Juvenil =

Orquesta Sinfónica Nacional Juvenil may refer to:

- National Youth Symphony Orchestra of Chile
- National Youth Symphony Orchestra of the Dominican Republic
