= Mehmet Erhan Tanman =

Turkish composer

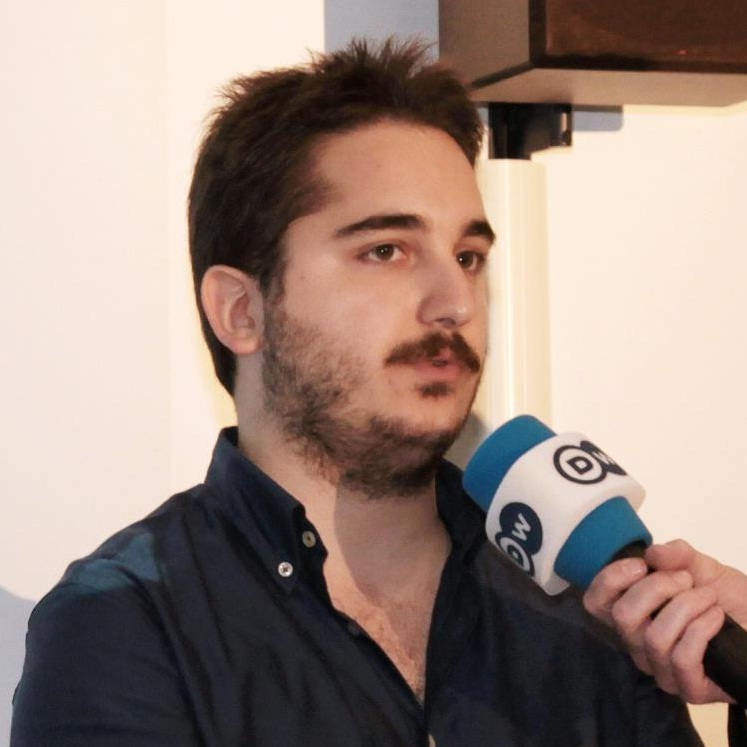
- Mehmet Erhan Tanman (during the press conference of Deutsche Welle, 2012)

Background information
- Born: 29 March 1989 (age 37); Istanbul, Turkey
- Genres: Contemporary classical
- Occupations: Composer, Lecturer and Writer
- Years active: 2004 – present
- Website: Official Website

Mehmet Erhan Tanman (born 29 March 1989) is a contemporary Turkish composer. One of the late-generation contemporary Turkish composers, he was honoured with the Deutsche Welle Composition Prize in 2012 and the Donizetti Classical Music Awards Young Musician of The Year award in 2013.

== Biography ==
Tanman was born in Istanbul on 29 March 1989. He began his musical training with piano lessons, which he studied with his father and as a chorist in TRT Child Chorus. He then completed his part-time education in piano at Mimar Sinan Fine Arts University State Conservatory, while he was at primary school. In later years, he studied composition and orchestration with Prof. Dr. Hasan Uçarsu, Prof. Dr. Özkan Manav and Doç. Mehmet Nemutlu, harmony and fugue with Volkan Barut, counterpoint with Babür Tongur, and piano with Prof. Selen Bucak at Mimar Sinan Fine Arts University State Conservatory, where he has received his bachelors degrees in composition and piano. His works have been performed in the United States, Germany, Austria, Switzerland, Belgium, and Turkey.

Tanman had his first orchestral concert experience as a composer in 2005 at the age of 16, with his work Symphonic Arrangements on R. Schumann's Album for the Young performed by MSFAU Symphony Orchestra, conducted by Erdem Çöloğlu. In coming years, his works and projects were commissioned and sponsored by Bludenz Kultur (Austria, 2008), Triage Modern Music Ensemble (Germany, 2010), La Mer String Quartet (Switzerland, 2011), Presidential Symphony Orchestra (Turkey, 2011), German broadcaster Deutsche Welle (Germany, 2012), and MeiningerMusik (Germany, 2013). Tanman's work for large orchestra, The Traffic, was commissioned by Deutsche Welle. The Traffic was premiered by the Turkish National Youth Philharmonic Orchestra (conducted by Cem Mansur) as part of Beethovenfest Bonn 2012.

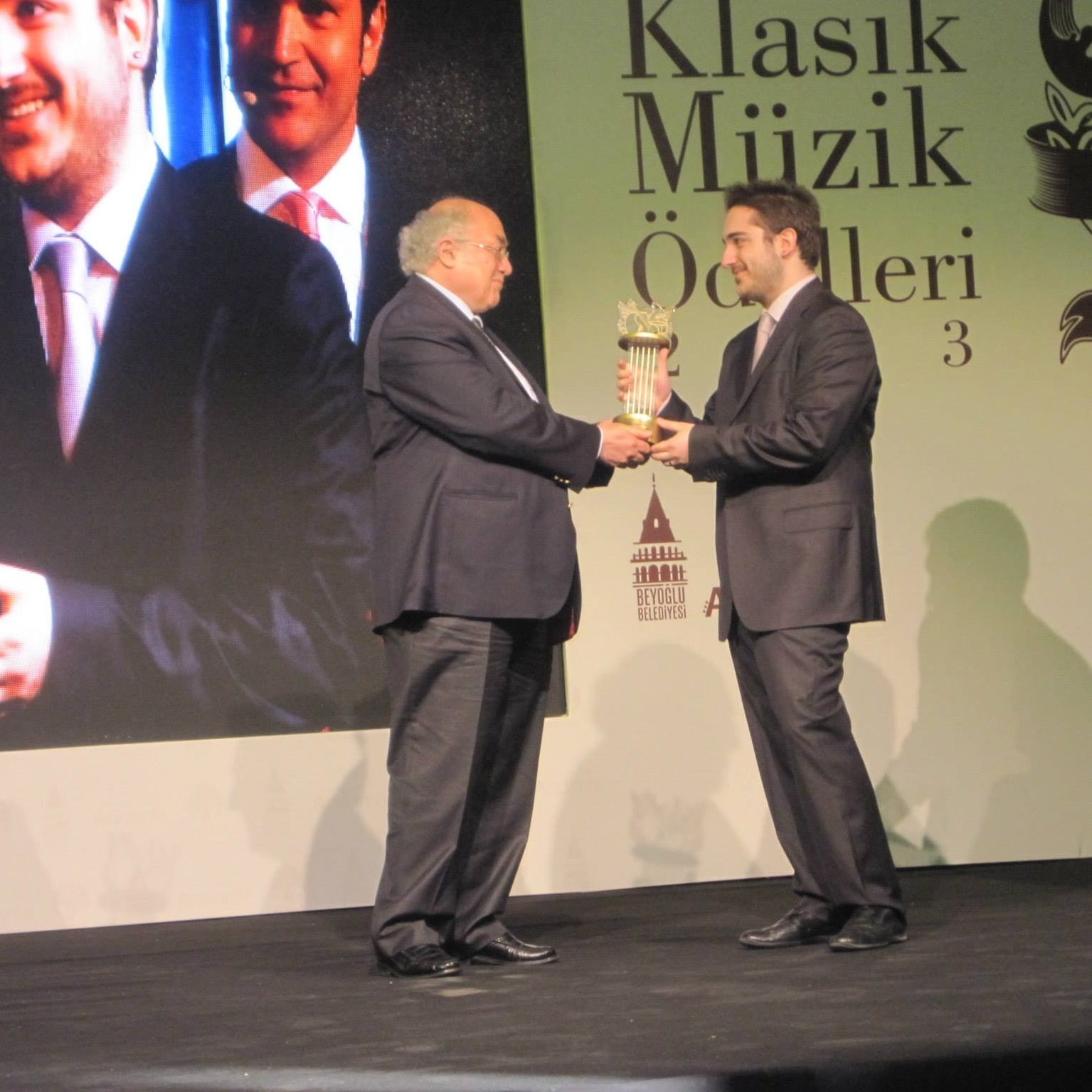
Mehmet Erhan Tanman, receiving "Young Musician of The Year" award from Şefik Kahramankaptan – Donizetti Classical Music Awards(2013)

His works have been honored with awards such as Donizetti Classical Music Awards "Young Musician of The Year" (2013), Deutsche Welle Composition Prize (2012), and Mersin International Music Festival Composition Competition – Third prize (2010). Beside these awards, a CD production of his work for large orchestra, The Traffic, was released by Deutsche Welle in 2013.

Beside these activities, Tanman has been a writer-member at the Turkish classical music magazine Andante, and he has been a lecturer of composition in the Kocaeli University State Conservatory's composition department.

== List of works ==
=== Orchestra ===
- The Traffic – for large orchestra (2011–12)
- Ocean Waves – for orchestra (2011)
- Ocean – for symphonic band and harp (2009)
- In Memoriam – for orchestra (2005)
- Symphonic Arrangements on R. Schumann's Album for the Young – for orchestra (2004)

=== Concertos ===
- Concerto for Marimba and Orchestra – for marimba and orchestra (2014)
- Concerto for Clarinet and Orchestra – for clarinet and orchestra (2014)

=== Chamber music ===
- Water-Waves – for flute, violoncello, contrabass, percussion and piano (2013)
- Surround'ed – for percussion trio (2012)
- Chilling Dreams – for mixed large ensemble (2012)
- The Cats – for string quartet (2010)
- A Phone Call – for clarinet, vibraphone and contrabass (2009)
- Misafir – for brass and percussion large ensemble (2008)

=== Solo ===
- Transcriptions 2 – for solo piano (2012)
- Transcriptions 1 – for solo piano (2011)
- Improvisations – for solo violoncello (2011)
- Sforzati – for solo timpani (2010)
- Rapshody – for solo piano (2005)
- Sonata – for solo piano (2004)

=== Electronic ===
- War – for electronics (2010)
- Psychosynthesis – for electronics (2011)

== Albums (CD) ==
- The Traffic (Turkish National Youth Philharmonic Orchestra / Cem Mansur, conductor) – Deutsche Welle (2012)
- Water-Waves (MeiningerMusik, Christiane Meininger) – Bayerische Rudfunk Nuremberg (2013*)
