= Andrei Ioniță =

Romanian cellist (born 1994)

- Born: 1 January 1994 (age 32); Bucharest, Romania
- Genres: Classical
- Occupation: Musician
- Instruments: cello, piano

Andrei Ionuț Ioniță (born 1 January 1994 in Bucharest) is a Romanian cellist. He won first prize in the cello division of the 2015 International Tchaikovsky Competition.

He grew up in Bucharest and Teleorman. Ioniță began studying piano when he was five years old and started cello lessons three years later. He studies at the Berlin University of the Arts under Jens Peter Maintz. In 2009, he won the David Popper International Cello Competition, and in 2013 won first prize in the Aram Khatchaturian International Competition. A year later, he took second place at the 63rd ARD International Music Competition and the Emanuel Feuermann Competition.

Ioniță has performed concertos with the Münchner Philharmoniker, Deutsches Symphonie-Orchester Berlin, Mariinsky Orchestra, St. Petersburg Philharmonic Orchestra, Czech Philharmonic, Radio-Symphonieorchester Wien, and Tokyo Philharmonic Orchestra; working with conductors such as Valeriy Gergiev, Mikhail Pletnev, and Nicholas Collon.

The 2017–18 season saw Ioniță debut with The Hallé and San Diego Symphony (both with Cristian Macelaru), BBC Philharmonic (with Yan Pascal Tortelier), Royal Scottish National Orchestra (with Karl-Heinz Steffens), Rochester Philharmonic, and Hamburger Symphoniker. He returned to the MDR Sinfonieorchester in Leipzig and toured Europe with the NFM Wrocław Philharmonic.

In recitals Ioniță has performed at Carnegie Hall, on tour in Japan, and at the Kissinger Sommer, Mecklenburg-Vorpommern, and Schleswig-Holstein festivals.

Other appearances include an artistic residence at the 2018 Alpenarte Festival in Austria, a tour with the BBC Philharmonic (the UK and Romania), concerts in Denmark (Yuri Temirkanov and the Danish National Symphony Orchestra), Russia (with the Russian National Orchestra and Mikhail Pletnev), and the United States (a tour with Cristian Măcelaru and the Romanian Youth Orchestra).

Ioniță is a scholarship recipient of the Deutsche Stiftung Musikleben and performs on a violoncello made by Giovanni Battista Rogeri from Brescia in 1671, on loan from the foundation.
