= National Youth Orchestra of the Netherlands =

- Youth orchestra
- Native name: Nationaal Jeugdorkest
- Short name: NJO
- Founded: 1957
- Location: Apeldoorn
- Website: www.njo.nl/english/orchestra/orchestra

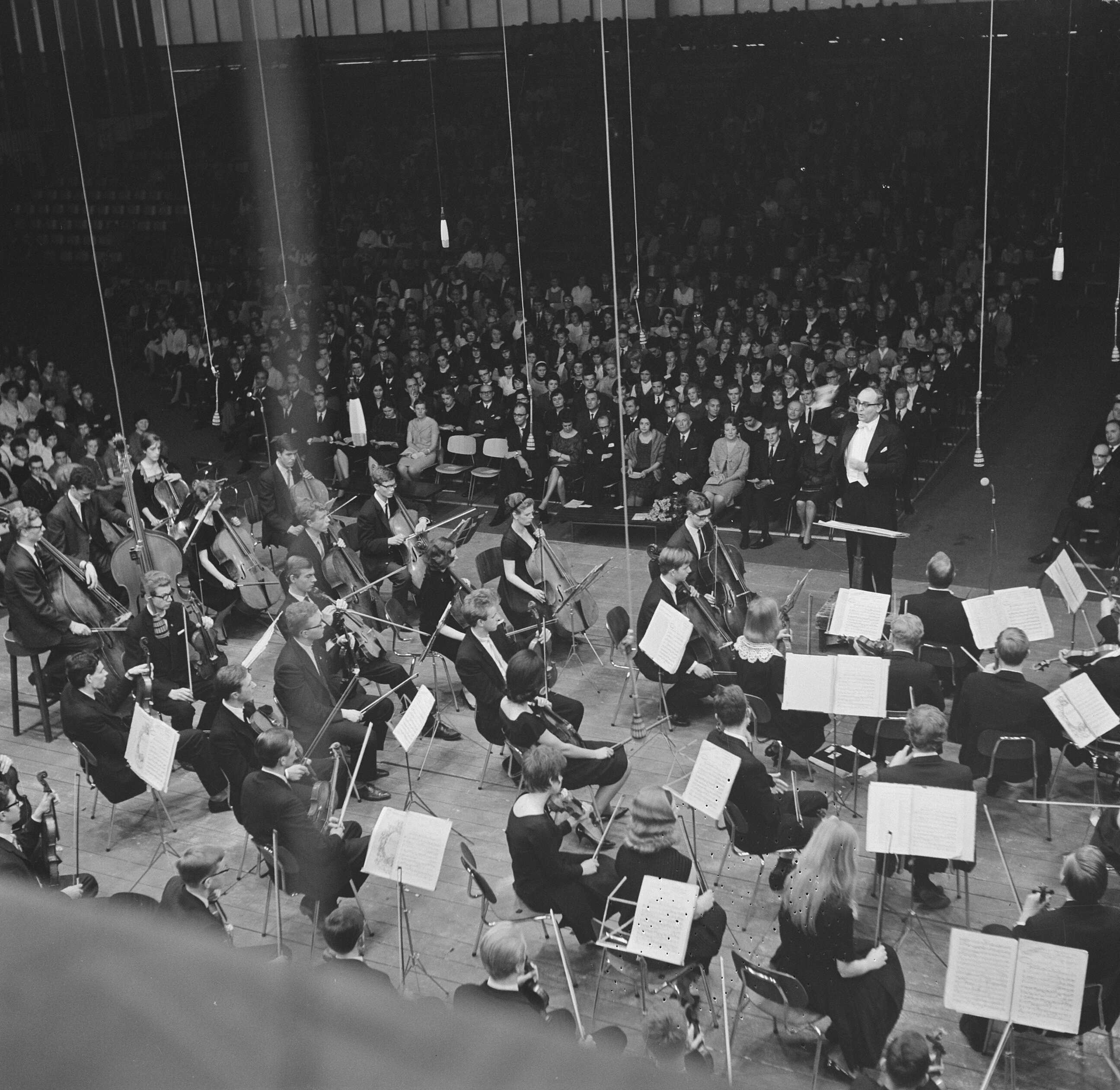
A concert of the NJO in the RAI Amsterdam, 1963

The National Youth Orchestra of the Netherlands (NJO, Dutch: Nationaal Jeugdorkest) is the national youth orchestra of the Netherlands, founded in 1957. It consists of young musicians between 18 and 26 years of age.

It has appeared with conductors including Philippe Herreweghe, Iván Fischer, Jaap van Zweden, Reinbert de Leeuw and Oliver Knussen and soloists Nino Gvetadze, Hannes Minnaar, Isabelle van Keulen, Lucas Jussen, Harriet Krijgh, Alexander Romanovsky, Alexander Sitkovetsky and Claron McFadden.

The orchestra made its debut at Young Euro Classic in 2015. It is a member of the European Federation of National Youth Orchestras.

== See also ==
- List of youth orchestras
