= National Youth Orchestra of China =

Chinese national youth orchestra

- Youth orchestra
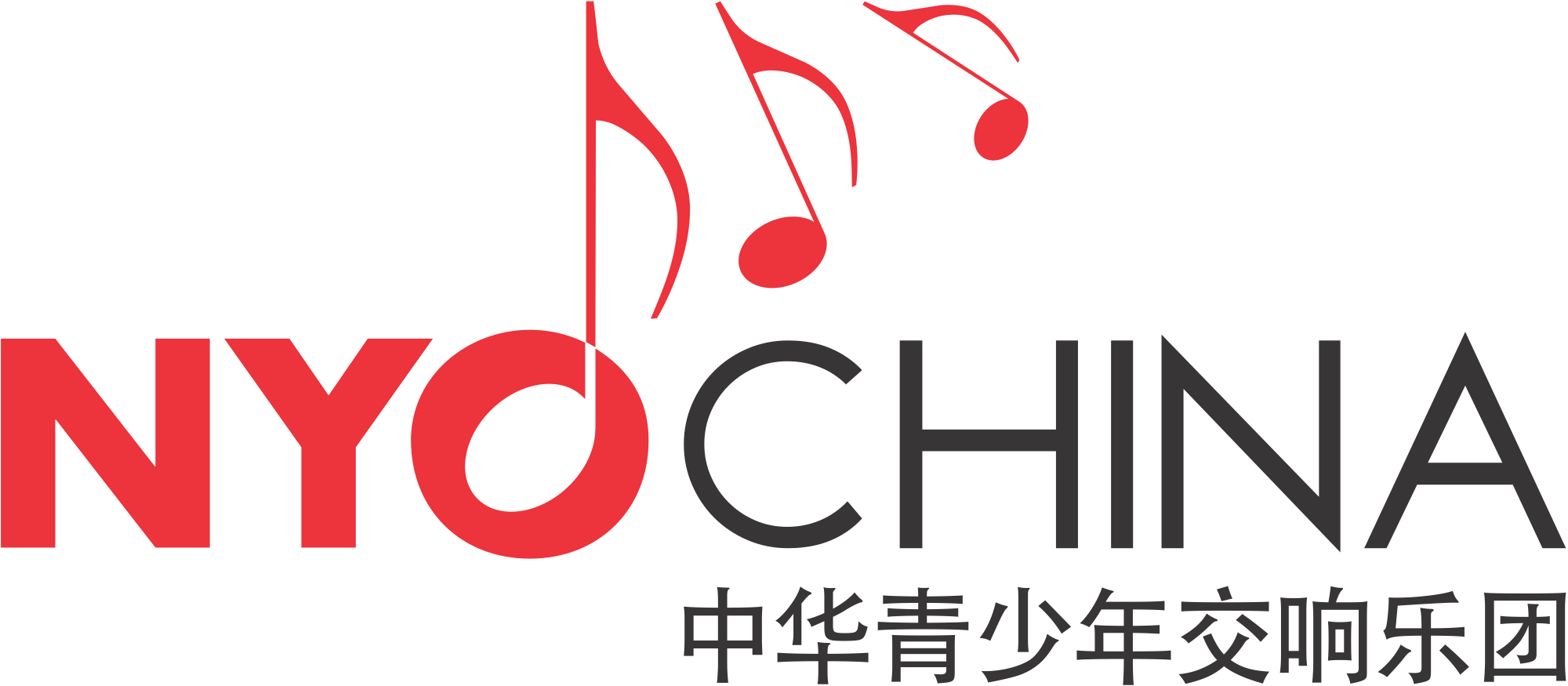
- Native name: 中华青少年交响乐团
- Short name: NYO-China
- Founded: 2015
- Music director: Ludovic Morlot
- Website: www.nyochina.org

The National Youth Orchestra of China (NYO-China, Chinese: 中华青少年交响乐团) is a full symphony youth orchestra composed of approximately 100 Chinese musicians aged 14 to 21 years old. Students from all over China audition to participate in a two-week training residency before performing alongside a renowned soloist and conductor in premier venues throughout the world.

The program is provided at no cost to students; all expenses, including travel, housing, and meals, are covered by the organization's supporters.

NYO-China was founded in late 2015 with its first residency and concert tour, featuring Yuja Wang and Olga Kern, taking place in July 2017. Its subsequent seasons included a reduced-scale Chamber Series in 2018 and a Europe Tour in 2019 with Garrick Ohlsson. Ludovic Morlot served as the orchestra's conductor for both its 2017 and 2019 seasons.

== Eligibility and auditions ==
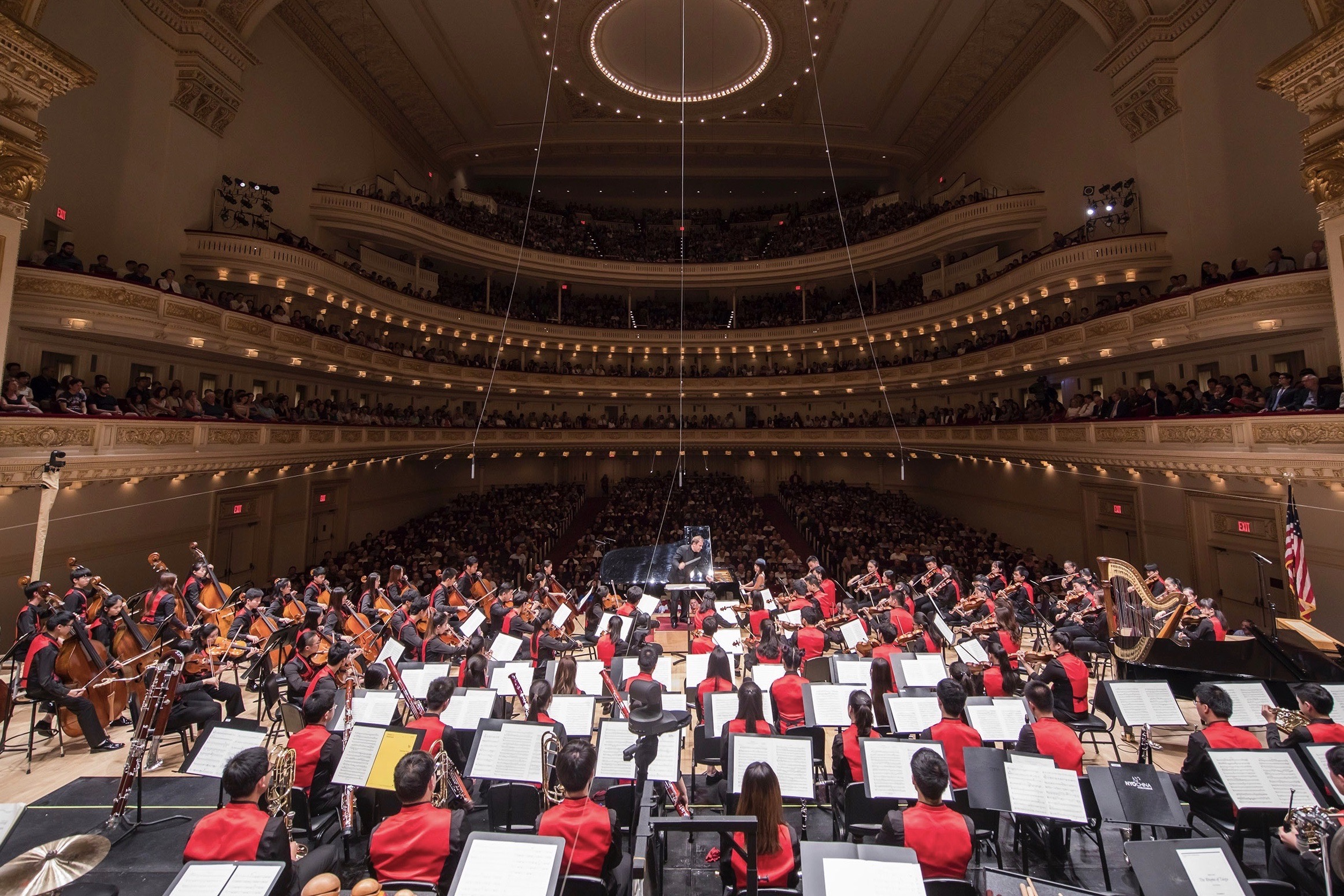
The National Youth Orchestra of China at Carnegie Hall with Yuja Wang.

To be eligible to join NYO-China, applicants must be between 14 and 21 years old when the residency and concert tour takes place. All applicants must also be citizens of the People's Republic of China, although they are permitted to be students and/or permanent residents in other countries.

Auditions are conducted online in the winter and spring preceding each residency. Requirements include a short biographical essay, a letter of recommendation from a music teacher, and videos of various selected excerpts and a piece of the applicant's choice. All alumni are required to submit a new application if they wish to join the ensemble for its forthcoming season, and no advantage is given to applicants for having previously performed in the orchestra.

In its first year, NYO-China received slightly over 1,000 applicants, of whom 110 were accepted and 105 matriculated. Subsequent seasons saw similarly competitive admissions.

Across its three seasons, the orchestra has represented musicians residing in over twenty provinces or administrative divisions of China, as well as Singapore, Germany, and the United States. The average age of participants is 18 years, with about half enrolled in secondary school and the other half enrolled in postsecondary school. Postsecondary institutions represented in this orchestra include the Central Conservatory of Music, the China Conservatory of Music, the Shanghai Conservatory of Music, the Paris Conservatory, the Juilliard School, the Colburn School, and the Curtis Institute of Music, among over a dozen others.

== Residency and concert tours ==
=== 2017 season ===
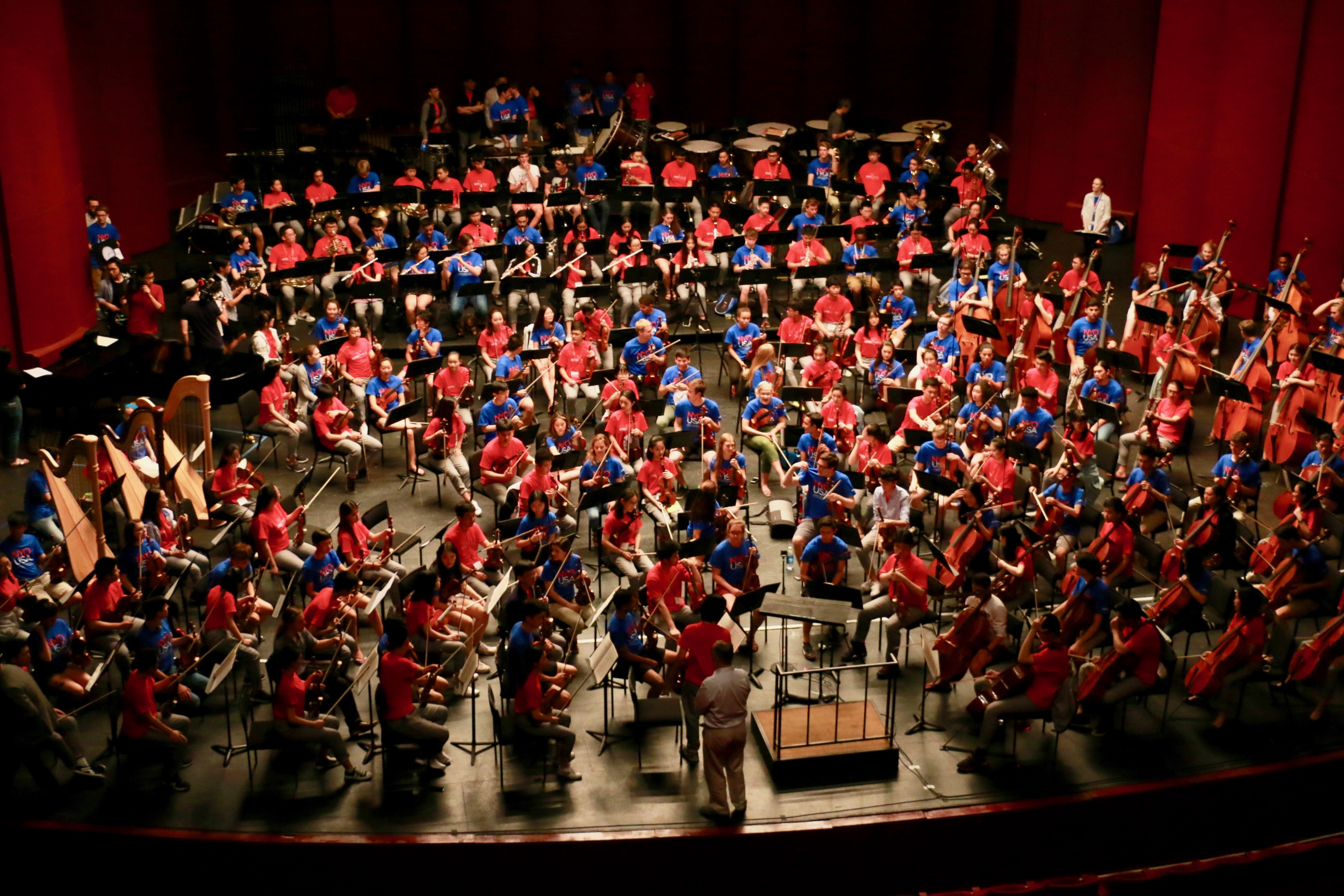
The National Youth Orchestra of China (in red) rehearsing alongside the National Youth Orchestra of the United States of America (in blue) at Purchase College on July 16, 2017.

The inaugural NYO-China, comprising 105 students, gathered in early July on East Stroudsburg University of Pennsylvania to begin their two-week residency under resident conductor Jindong Cai, professor of conducting at Stanford University, and a suite of bilingual teaching artists recruited from leading orchestras worldwide; concertmaster of the New York Philharmonic Frank Huang served as the teaching artist for the orchestra's violin section. Besides full orchestral and sectional rehearsals, students also attended seminars and workshops on Alexander Technique with Lori Schiff and improvisation with Eugene Friesen, as well as chamber music activities coordinated by the residency's staff. Students also recorded with WQXR-FM and From the Top on NPR, participated in excursions to Yale University and New York City, and rehearsed with Carnegie Hall's National Youth Orchestra of the United States of America (NYO-USA) at their residency at Purchase College in New York.

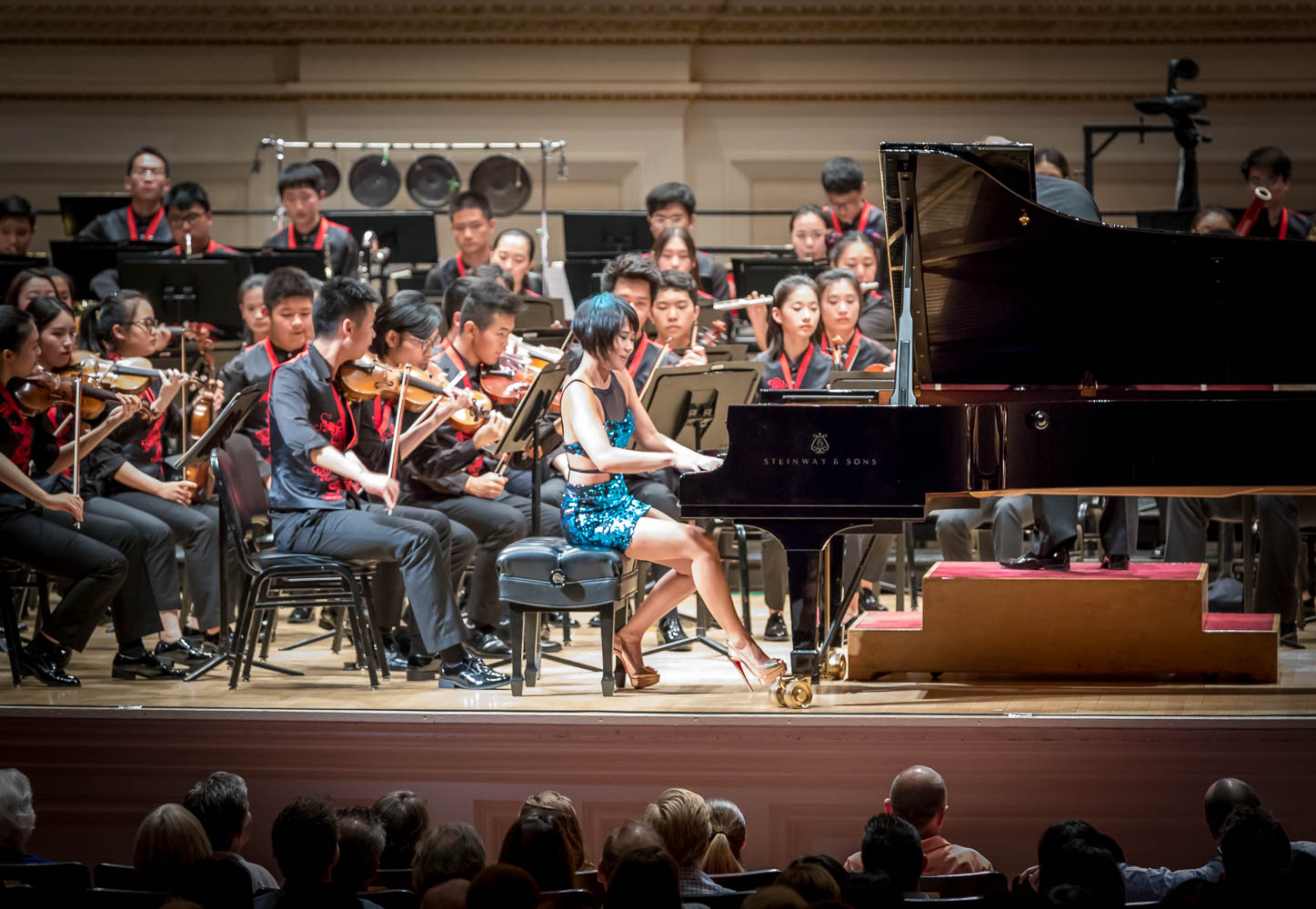
The National Youth Orchestra of China performing with Yuja Wang and Ludovic Morlot (hidden) at Carnegie Hall on July 22, 2017.

Music Director of the Seattle Symphony Ludovic Morlot joined the orchestra to lead rehearsals during the latter half of the residency. On July 22, the orchestra premiered at Carnegie Hall's 2804-seat Main Hall (Stern Auditorium/Perelman Stage) with Morlot conducting and Yuja Wang performing on piano in a sold-out concert simultaneously streamed to audiences worldwide via Medici.tv. In attendance was the National Youth Orchestra of the United States of America, which itself had performed one day prior on the same stage. The orchestra then embarked on a concert tour of China, performing at the Beijing Concert Hall, the Shanghai Oriental Art Center, and the Suzhou Culture and Arts Centre. Winner of the 11th Van Cliburn International Piano Competition Olga Kern joined the orchestra for its performances in China. As part of their official performance uniform, students adorned specially commissioned vests designed by Chinese couture designer Guo Pei.

The orchestra's concert program included “The Rhyme of Taigu” by Pulitzer Prize-winning composer Zhou Long; Piano Concerto No. 1 in B-flat Minor by Pyotr Ilyich Tchaikovsky; and Symphony No. 9 in E Minor “From the New World” (popularly known as the New World Symphony) by Antonín Leopold Dvořák. “Thunder in the Drought”, a Chinese folk song arranged for orchestra by Ye Xiaogang, served as the ensemble's encore piece.

=== 2018 season ===
NYO-China returned in 2018 as a smaller program for 21 students centered around the art and performance of chamber music. Following a residency at the Central Conservatory of Music in Beijing with musicians Qing Li, Yong Ma, and Guang Chen, students performed alongside faculty at multiple venues throughout mainland China; these included: the Yale Center Beijing, the Central Conservatory of Music Opera & Concert Hall, New York University Shanghai, the Chuansha Piano Festival, and the Qingdao Eurochestries Festival.

Select students were also invited to perform alongside members of the National Youth Orchestra of the United States of America at a private recital at the United States Embassy in Beijing with United States Ambassador to China Terry Branstad in attendance.

=== 2019 season ===
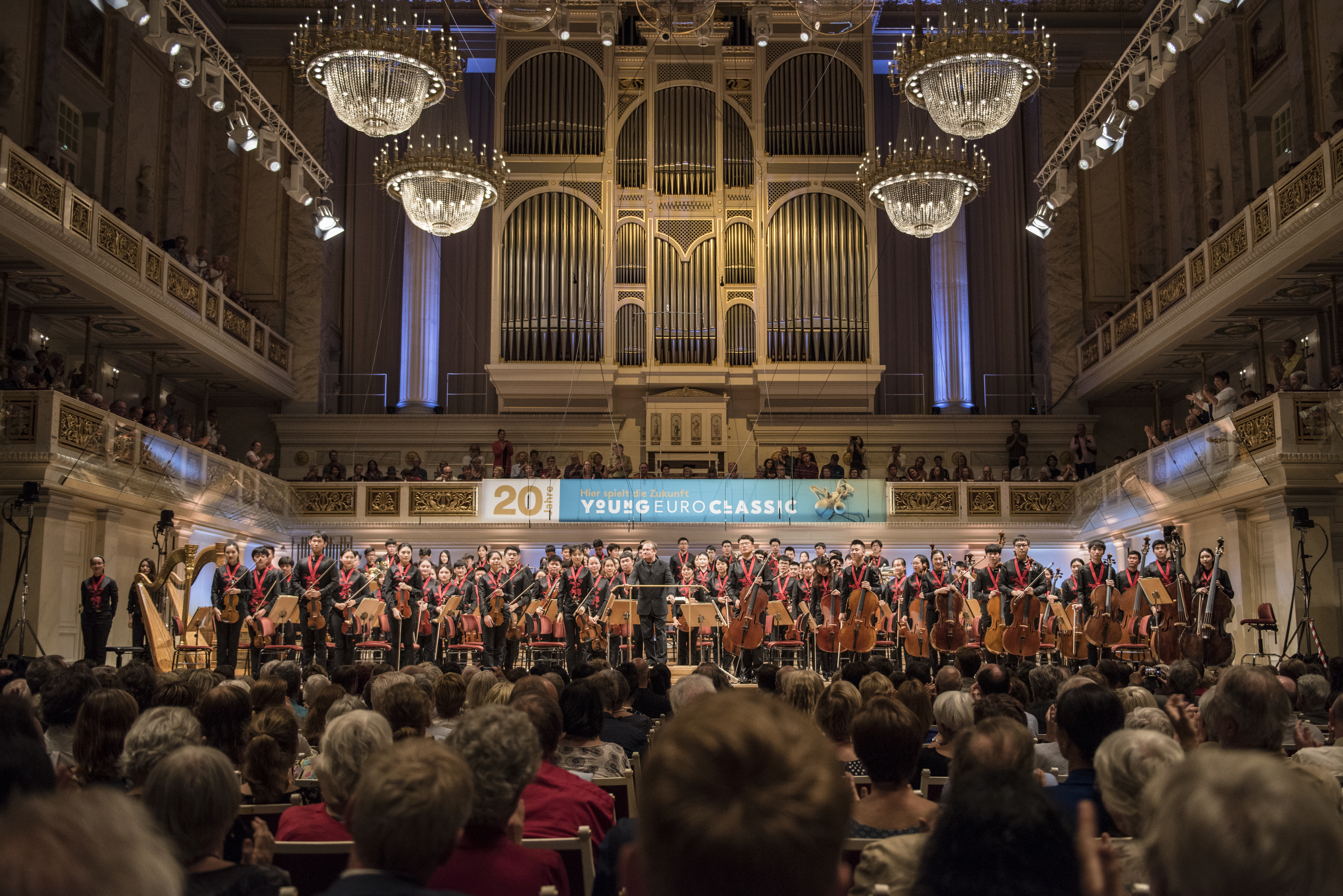
The National Youth Orchestra of China with Ludovic Morlot performing at Young Euro Classic on August 5, 2019.

The 2019 season saw the return of the full orchestra, with 101 students gathering for a residency at Shanghai University in July. As was the case in 2017, each section was taught by a dedicated faculty member recruited from among the principal players of preeminent international orchestras. The program's 2017 conductor Ludovic Morlot also returned to lead rehearsals throughout the entire duration of the residency.

On August 1, the orchestra premiered at the Shanghai Oriental Art Center with pianist Garrick Ohlsson, the first and only American to win the International Chopin Piano Competition. It then traveled to Berlin, Germany to make its European debut at Young Euro Classic, a festival of renowned youth orchestras including the European Union Youth Orchestra, the National Youth Orchestra of the United States of America, and the National Youth Orchestra of Great Britain held annually at the Konzerthaus Berlin; the sold-out concert was also broadcast live to audiences throughout Europe on ARTE and later featured on CCTV for viewers in China. The orchestra then continued to Snape, Suffolk in the United Kingdom to perform at the Snape Proms, and thereafter concluded its tour in Bolzano, Italy with a concert at the Bolzano Festival Bolzen.

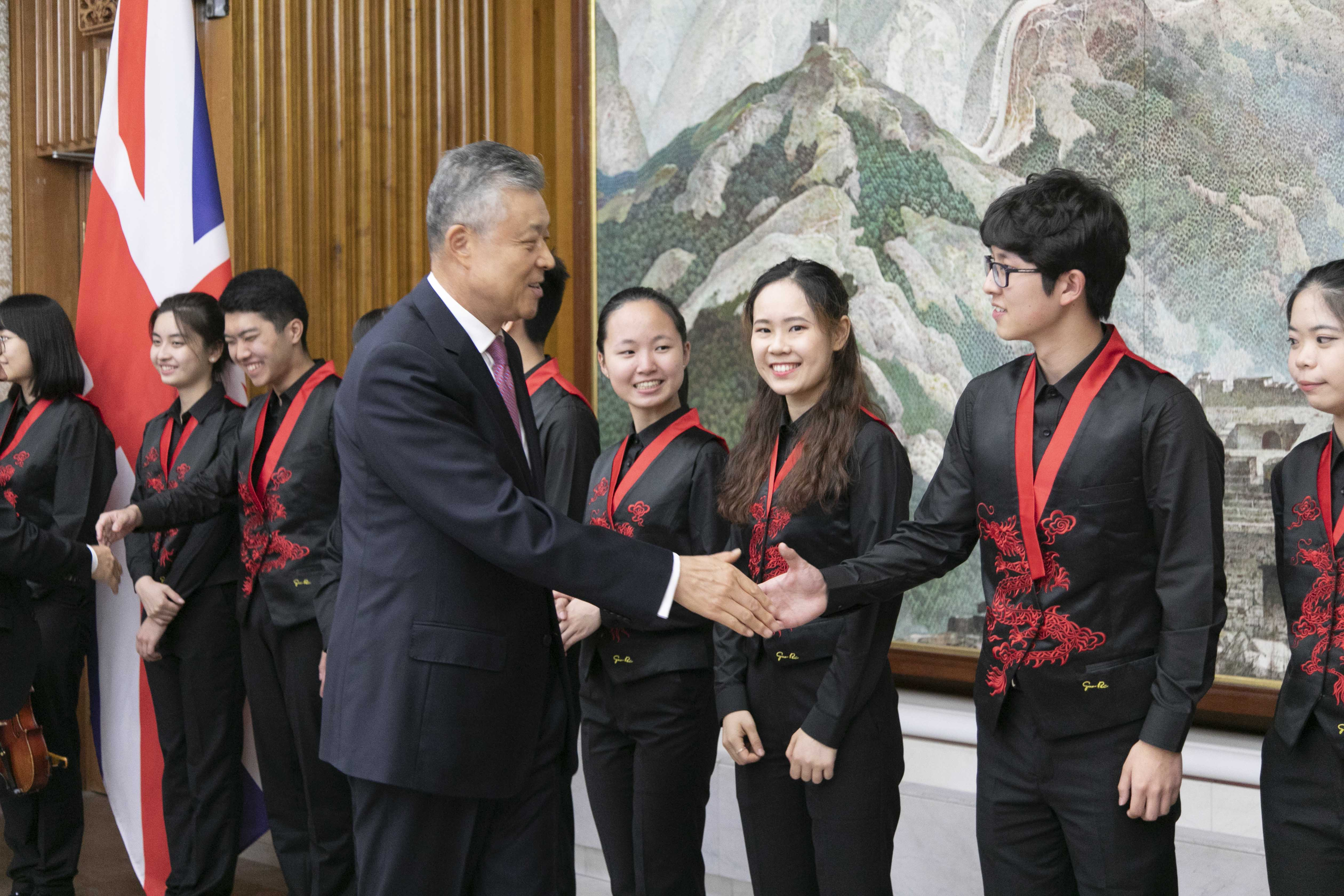
Ambassador Liu Xiaoming meeting students from the National Youth Orchestra of China following a performance at the Chinese Embassy in London on August 6, 2019.

While in the United Kingdom, select students were invited to perform at the Embassy of China in London in a chamber concert attended and hosted by Chinese Ambassador to the United Kingdom Liu Xiaoming. Chinese Ambassador to Germany Wu Ken was also in attendance at the orchestra's performance in Berlin and met with students following their concert.

The program featured the “Tianjin Suite” by Ye Xiaogang; Piano Concerto No. 5 in E-flat minor (commonly referred to as the Emperor Concerto) by Ludwig van Beethoven; and Symphony No. 5 in D minor by Dmitri Shostakovich. Encores for this season included “Dance of the Drayman” from Shostakovich's The Bolt and an orchestral arrangement of the popular Chinese folk song “Jasmine Flower”.

== Critical reception ==
NYO-China's 2017 debut at Carnegie Hall conducted by Ludovic Morlot and featuring pianist Yuja Wang received pronounced critical acclaim from various American music columns and publications. Anthony Tommasini, the chief classical music critic for The New York Times, remarked that “if [the performance at Carnegie Hall] was a test run for this new venture, these Chinese musicians scored big”; he furthermore commended Morlot for his “vibrant account of Dvořák's New World Symphony from the well-prepared players, with full-bodied string tone, folkloric charm and lots of brio.” The orchestra's subsequent performances in Beijing, Shanghai, and Suzhou with Olga Kern on piano were also applauded by numerous Chinese critics, including from China Daily, People's Daily, and the Xinhua News Agency.

NYO-China's 2018 and 2019 tours were also warmly received. The orchestra's performance in Berlin, Germany with pianist Garrick Ohlsson was especially praised, with Der Tagesspiegel celebrating the ensemble's power and artistic prowess.

== Management and funding ==
Composer Ye Xiaogang acts as the ceremonial Tuanzhang of the National Youth Orchestra of China, while Chinese philanthropist He Mei serves as the founding benefactor of the project. Vincent Accettola and Owen Brown – former roommates at Yale University – formed NYO-China's inaugural management team, serving as the program's Managing Director and Director of Development, respectively. Social entrepreneur Sabrina Xu also serves as a Project Director. American classical pianist and Dean of the Yale School of Music Robert Blocker assists the team as a senior advisor, as did Chinese American businesswoman and New York Philharmonic board member Shirley Young.

In January 2020, French conductor Ludovic Morlot, Music Director Emeritus of the Seattle Symphony and NYO-China's featured conductor during its 2017 and 2019 seasons, was announced as the organization's Artistic Director, a role through which he oversees selection of the residency's faculty and orchestra's programming.

Executive and Artistic Director of Carnegie Hall Sir Clive Gillinson and the staff of the Weill Music Institute were instrumental in assisting NYO-China during the first year of its organization. The motivating insight to create a national youth orchestra for China was provided by Gillinson during the National Youth Orchestra of the United States of America's 2015 China tour given the especially warm reception the ensemble received from young Chinese audiences.

Other corporations, organizations, and state institutions that were helpful in the development of NYO-China include Steinway & Sons, the Yale School of Music, the China Symphony Development Foundation, the Chinese Musicians Association, Bright Food, the China Institute, the Committee of 100, the US-China Youth Education Solutions Foundation, and the Consulate General of the People's Republic of China in New York.

== See also ==
- National Youth Orchestra of the United States of America
- European Union Youth Orchestra
- List of youth orchestras
