= Portuguese Chamber Orchestra =

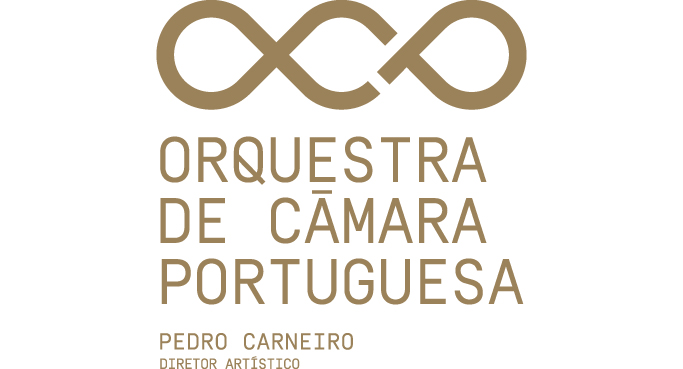
- Native name: Orquestra de Câmara Portuguesa
- Founded: 2007
- Concert hall: Belém Cultural Center
- Principal conductor: Pedro Carneiro
- Website: ocp.org.pt

The Portuguese Chamber Orchestra (OCP) was founded on July 5, 2007, and its debut took place on September 13, 2007, with the opening concert of the 2007/2008 season at the Grand Auditorium of Belém Cultural Center, in Lisbon. The programme included the overture to Der Schauspieldirektor by Mozart, the Symphony No. 6 by Schubert, and the ballet suite Pulcinella by Stravinsky. The head office of OCP is in Oeiras, Portugal.

== History ==
The artistic direction is assured by Pedro Carneiro. The Belém Cultural Center (CCB) hosted OCP, first as associate orchestra, and since 2008 as orchestra-in-residence. OCP performed the opening season concert at CCB in 2007/08 and 2010/11. Their presence at the annual music festival "Music Days in Belém" has been constant, making room for new soloists and conductors such as Pedro Amaral, Pedro Neves, Luís Carvalho, Alberto Roque and Jose Gomes. OCP has worked with composers Emmanuel Nunes and Sofia Gubaidulina and also played with renowned soloists Jorge Moyano, Cristina Ortiz, Sergio Tiempo, Gary Hoffman, Filipe Pinto-Ribeiro, Carlos Alves, Heinrich Schiff, Antonio Rosado, among others. The first international concert of OCP took place at the 2010 City of London Festival, and received four stars from The Times:

That was a highlight of the festival's first evening, but not the only one. Earlier we had heard undeconstructed Chopin: his Second Piano Concerto characterfully played by Cristina Ortiz with the Portuguese Chamber Orchestra. ... as well as a white-knuckle ride through Beethoven's First Symphony under Pedro Carneiro's flamboyant direction. – The Times, 23 June 2010

OCP opened the first arts festival of Coimbra in 2009, and since then has played concerts in the cities of Almada, Castelo Branco, Vila Viçosa, in the festivals of Alcobaça, Leiria and Paços de Brandão, at the Christmas concerts in Lisbon and at the Festival ao Largo from the Teatro Nacional de São Carlos. In 2013, OCP was the orchestra chosen by the DGPC to take part in the "Network of Concerts 2013 – Classical Music" tour, with presentations in Convent of Christ (Tomar), Jerónimos Monastery, Batalha Monastery and Alcobaça Monastery.

== Portuguese Youth Orchestra ==
The Portuguese Youth Orchestra (JOP, Portuguese: Jovem Orquestra Portuguesa) is the national youth orchestra of Portugal, launched as OCPzero in 2010.

The orchestra made its debut at Young Euro Classic in 2015.

It is a member of the European Federation of National Youth Orchestras.
