= Stefan Geiger =

German conductor and trombonist

Stefan Geiger (born 1967) is a German conductor and trombonist. In 2016 he became the conductor and music director of Orquestra Sinfônica do Paraná in Curitiba.

== Early life ==
He started to learn the piano, violin, drums and trombone at age 5.

Coming from a family of musicians, Geiger played his first trombone notes with his elder brother. He stated, "My brother, who is 14 years older than me, was my first trombone teacher. I was very lucky to be born in a family like that. My father didn't make me practice many hours per day, it wasn't like that. He gave me the opportunity to learn a lot about music".

He earned a scholarship from the Studienstiftung des deutschen Volkes. He graduated in musical direction.

== Career ==
He began his career as a solo trombone player at Bayerische Staatsoper, in Munich. Among his teachers were Branimir Slokar (trombone) and Peter Eötvös (conducting). Shortly after, he played for NDR Elbphilharmonie Orchester, in Hamburg. He worked as an assistant to Cristoph Eschenbach, Valery Gergiev and Christoph von Dohanyi. In 1996, he became artistic director at Landesjurgendorchester Bremen. From 2002 to 2007 he worked with the direction for the Bremen orchestra Hochschule für Künste.

=== Guest conductor ===
Geiger worked as guest conductor for the NDR Elbphilharmonie Orchester, Schleswig-Holstein Festival Orchester, Ensemble Resonanz, Würzburger Philharmoniker, Nürnberger Symphoniker, Deutsche Kammerphilharmonie Bremen, Transylvania State Philharmonic Orchestra, Orquestra de Câmara da Cidade de Curitiba, and the Romanian Youth Orchestra.

On 1 September 1991 he took a position as a trombonist at Elbphilharmonie Orchester, in Hamburg. He acts as guest conductor, working in concerts that range from classic symphonic repertoire to game music and film concerts.

=== Orquestra Sinfônica do Paraná ===
In 2016, Geiger became principal conductor and music director at Orquestra Sinfônica do Paraná, at Teatro Guaíra, Curitiba, Paraná, Brazil. He was chosen by the orchestra's musicians. At OSP he conducted classical music concerts, contemporary music concerts and film concerts with music from Metropolis (1927) and City Lights (1931). The reformulation of part of the orchestra happened in 2017, Geiger's second year as director.

== Recognition ==
Geiger is the co-founder and committee member of German Games Music Awards, competition for young videogame soundtrack composers.

Geiger has won prizes including Concour International du Festival de Musique de Toulon, in 1989 and the Prague Spring Festival in 1992
