= Turkish National Youth Philharmonic Orchestra =

National youth orchestra of Turkey

- Youth orchestra
- Native name: Türkiye Gençlik Filarmoni Orkestrası
- Founded: 2007
- Location: Istanbul, Turkey
- Principal conductor: Cem Mansur
- Website: genclikfilarmoni.org

The Turkish National Youth Philharmonic Orchestra (Turkish: Türkiye Gençlik Filarmoni Orkestrası) is the national youth orchestra of Turkey, consisting of young musicians aged 15 to 22. It was founded in 2007 in Istanbul.

The orchestra has appeared with conductors and soloists including Murray Perahia, Salvatore Accardo, Shlomo Mintz, Natalia Gutman, Alice Sara Ott, Stephen Kovacevich, Kristof Barati and Ivo Pogorelich. A performance at Young Euro Classic 2019 was described by the Tagesspiegel as "technically convincing and with a lot of romantic emphasis".

It is a member of the European Federation of National Youth Orchestras.

== See also ==
- List of youth orchestras
