= National Youth Symphony Orchestra of the Dominican Republic =

National youth orchestra of the Dominican Republic

- Youth orchestra
- Native name: Orquesta Sinfónica Nacional Juvenil República Dominicana
- Short name: OSNJ
- Founded: 1998

The National Youth Symphony Orchestra of the Dominican Republic (OSNJ) (Spanish: Orquesta Sinfónica Nacional Juvenil República Dominicana) is the national youth orchestra of the Dominican Republic, founded in 1998 with support of the Ministry of Culture.

It gave its debut at Young Euro Classic in 2019 with Alberto Rincón his conductor.

== See also ==
- List of youth orchestras
