= Romanian Youth Orchestra =

National youth orchestra of Romania

- Youth orchestra
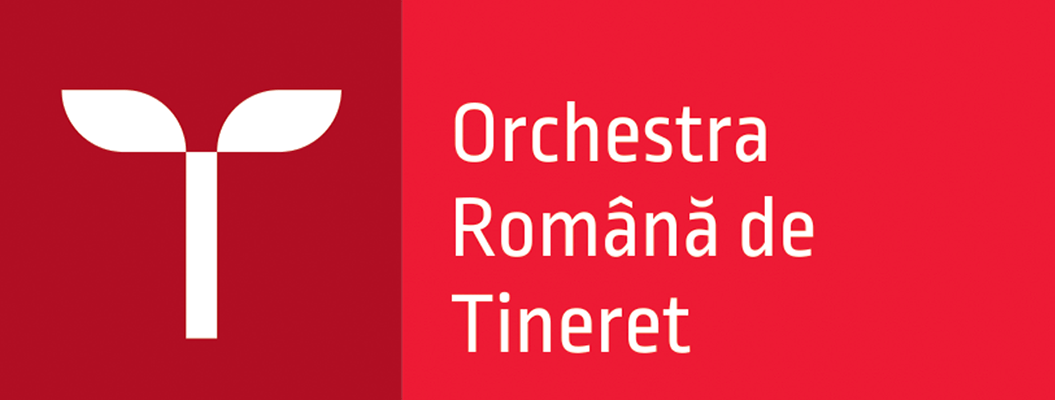
- Native name: Orchestra Română de Tineret
- Founded: 2008
- Music director: Cristian Mandeal
- Website: orchestratineret.ro

The Romanian Youth Orchestra (Romanian: Orchestra Română de Tineret) is the national youth orchestra of Romania.

Conductors and soloists that appeared with the orchestra include Bogdan Bacanu, Sarah Chang, Amanda Forsyth, David Garrett, Stefan Geiger, Andrei Ioniță, Kristjan Järvi, Roman Kim, Elizabeth Leonskaja, Plamena Mangova, Valentina Naforniță, Olga Pasichnyk, Olga Scheps, Emmanuel Séjourné and Pinchas Zukerman.

It is a member of the European Federation of National Youth Orchestras.

== See also ==
- List of youth orchestras
