= National Youth Orchestra of the United States of America =

American musical group

- Youth orchestra
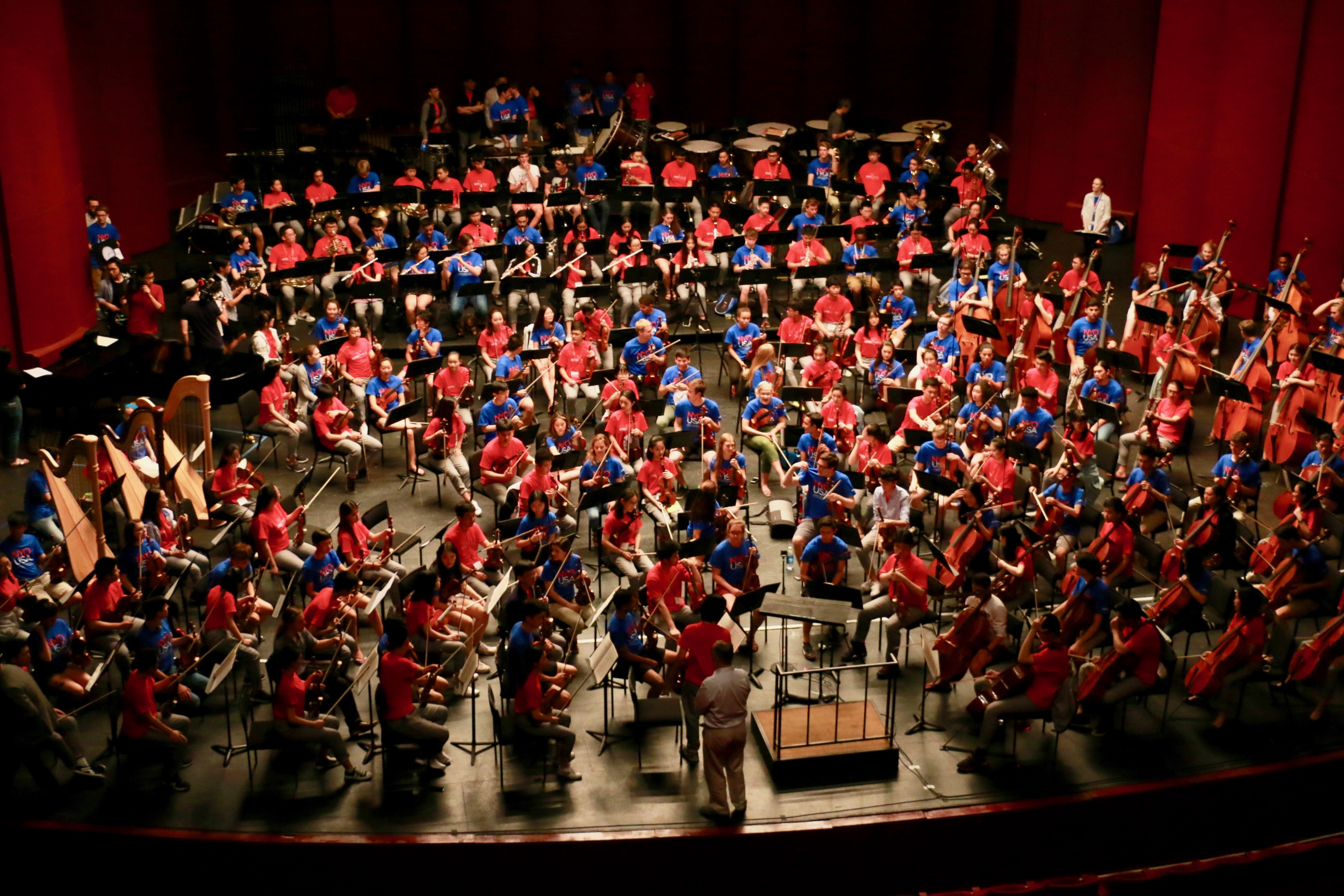
- The National Youth Orchestra of China (in red) rehearsing alongside the National Youth Orchestra of the United States of America (in blue)
- Short name: NYO-USA
- Founded: 2012
- Location: Purchase College, State University of New York
- Website: www.carnegiehall.org/Education/Young-Musicians/NYO-USA

The National Youth Orchestra of the United States of America (NYO-USA) is the national youth orchestra of the United States. Organized by Carnegie Hall's Weill Music Institute, it was established in 2012, and its first concert tour took place in the summer of 2013. Each summer, following an application and audition process, about 100 musicians ages 16 to 19 attend a two-week residency at Purchase College, New York, followed by a national or international tour.

== History ==
In January 2012, Carnegie Hall announced the launch of the National Youth Orchestra of the United States of America (NYO-USA). The orchestra was created by Weill Music Institute, the hall's music education and community outreach wing. The NYO-USA was set up along broadly similar lines to the National Youth Orchestra of Great Britain.

== Organization ==
Supported by a faculty of principal players from professional American orchestras, the musicians' preparation during NYO-USA's residency is overseen by the orchestra director. The current orchestra director is James E. Ross.

The NYO-USA has no permanent music director and is instead led by a different conductor each summer. The inaugural guest conductor was Russian conductor Valery Gergiev.

== Orchestra membership and activities ==
The NYO-USA is a full symphony orchestra consisting of around 110 young musicians. Depending on the repertoire for the season it may or may not include harpists and orchestral keyboardists. Four to five students are also selected each year in apprenticeship positions such as composers, librarians, and orchestra managers.

Membership to the orchestra changes each year with an annual application and audition process.

=== Eligibility ===
To apply to join the NYO-USA, applicants must be between the ages of 16 and 19 years old during the summer of participation (e.g. for the 2020 season, applicants' birthdays must fall between July 1, 2000, and June 30, 2004). Additionally, applicants must be United States citizens or permanent residents who did not graduate from high school earlier than their year of participation (no gap year students).

=== Applications and auditions ===
Applications to join the NYO-USA are made online between the August and November preceding the summer of participation, and include a brief biographical essay, two recommendations and an audition video including a piece of choice and several excerpts. The audition video must also include spoken (biographical, motivational) sequences.

Applicants may apply more than once in any one year by submitting applications for more than one instrument (excluding instrument sub-family combinations such as piccolo and flute), but respective full applications have to be made.

Former members of the NYO-USA may apply to rejoin as long as the eligibility criteria, above, are met.

== Seasons ==
Season	Guest conductor	Guest soloist	Tour venues	Repertoire
2013	Valery Gergiev	Joshua Bell, violin	Washington, D.C., US; Moscow, Russia; St Petersburg, Russia; London, UK	Sean Shepherd – Magiya; Tchaikovsky – Violin Concerto; Shostakovich – Symphony No. 10
2014	David Robertson	Gil Shaham, violin	New York City, US; Lenox, Massachusetts; Boone, North Carolina; Chicago, Illinois; Teton Village, Wyoming; Rohnert Park, California; Los Angeles, California	Bernstein - Symphonic Dances from West Side Story; Britten - Violin Concerto; Samuel Carl Adams - Radial Play (commissioned by Carnegie Hall); Mussorgsky - Pictures at an Exhibition
2015	Charles Dutoit	Yundi Li, piano	New York City, US; Beijing, China; Shanghai, China; Suzhou, China; Xi'an, China; Shenzhen, China; Guangzhou, China; Hong Kong	Tan Dun - Passacaglia: ''Secret of Winds and Birds''; Beethoven - Piano Concerto No. 5; Berlioz - Symphonie Fantastique
2016	Christoph Eschenbach; Valery Gergiev	Emanuel Ax, piano Denis Matsuev, piano	New York City, US; Amsterdam, Netherlands; Montpellier, France; Copenhagen, Denmark; Prague, Czech Republic	Bruckner - Symphony No. 6 (Bruckner); Mozart - Piano Concerto No. 22 (Mozart)
2017	Marin Alsop		New York City, US; Guadalajara, Mexico; Quito, Ecuador; Bogotá, Colombia	Mahler - Symphony No. 1; Adams - Short Ride in a Fast Machine; Frank - Apu
2018	Michael Tilson Thomas	Jean-Yves Thibaudet, piano	New York City, US; Taipei, Taiwan; Shanghai, China; Beijing, China; Seoul, South Korea; Daejeon, South Korea	Gershwin - Piano Concerto in F Major; Ted Hearne - Brass Tacks; Sibelius - Symphony No. 2
2019	Sir Antonio Pappano	Joyce DiDonato, mezzo-soprano Magdalena Kožená, mezzo-soprano Isabel Leonard, mezzo-soprano	Lenox, Massachusetts; New York City, US; Berlin, Germany (Young Euro Classic); Edinburgh, UK; London, UK; Amsterdam, Netherlands; Hamburg, Germany	R. Strauss - Eine Alpensinfonie, Op. 64; Prokofiev - Symphony No. 5, Op. 100; Berlioz - Les nuits d'été, Op. 7; Benjamin S. Beckman - Occidentalis (World Premiere); Tyson J. Davis - Delicate Tension (World Premiere)
2020	Carlos Miguel Prieto		Online, over Zoom	Valerie Coleman - Excerpt from Umoja; Igor Stravinsky - Excerpt from The Rite of Spring
2021	Carlos Miguel Prieto		No tour occurred due to the COVID-19 Pandemic.	Tchaikovsky - Symphony No. 6 in B minor, Op. 74, "Pathétique"; Revueltas - Sensemayá; Moncayo - Huapongo; Anna Clyne - Sound and Fury; Shostakovich - Excerpts from Lady Macbeth of Mtsensk Suite
2022	Daniel Harding	Alisa Weilerstein, cello	New York City, US; Amsterdam, Netherlands; Berlin, Germany (Young Euro Classic); Ravello, Italy; Lucerne, Switzerland	Elgar - Cello Concerto in E minor, Op. 85; G. Mahler - Symphony No. 5
2023	Sir Andrew Davis	Gil Shaham, violin (Barber) Hilary Hahn, violin (Tchaikovsky)	Groton, MA (with Gil Shaham); New York, NY (with Gil Shaham); Joliette, QC, Canada (with Gil Shaham); Nashville, TN (with Hilary Hahn); Dallas, TX (with Hilary Hahn); Teton Village, WY (with Gil Shaham); Stanford, CA (with Gil Shaham); San Diego, CA (with Gil Shaham)	Valerie Coleman - Giants of Light (commissioned by Carnegie Hall); Barber - Violin Concerto, Op. 14; Tchaikovsky - Violin Concerto in D major, Op. 35; Berlioz - Symphonie fantastique, Op. 14
2024	Marin Alsop	Jean-Yves Thibaudet, piano	New York City, US; Montevideo, Uruguay; Buenos Aires, Argentina; Rio de Janeiro, Brazil; São Paulo, Brazil	Barber Symphony No. 1; Rhapsody in Blue; Scheherazade (Rimsky-Korsakov)
2025	Gianandrea Noseda	Ray Chen, violin Clara-Jumi Kang (South Korea), violin	New York City, US; Osaka, Japan; Tokyo, Japan; Hong Kong; Beijing, China; Shanghai, China; Seoul, South Korea	Carlos Simon: Festival Fanfare and Overture; Mendelssohn Violin Concerto in E minor; Rachmaninoff Symphony no. 2
2026	Karina Canellakis	Kirill Gerstein, piano	New York City, US; Berlin, Germany (Young Euro Classic); Amsterdam, Netherlands; Aldeburgh, UK (Britten Pears Arts); Edinburgh, UK (Edinburgh International Festival)	Samuel Barber - Overture to The School for Scandal; George Gershwin - Piano Concerto in F Major; Béla Bartók - Concerto for Orchestra

== See also ==
- List of youth orchestras in the United States
- List of youth orchestras
