= Pedro Carneiro (footballer) =

Portuguese footballer

Personal information
- Full name: Pedro Zêzere Neves Carneiro
- Date of birth: 25 November 1997 (age 28)
- Place of birth: Lisbon, Portugal
- Height: 1.76 m (5 ft 9 in)
- Position: Midfielder

Team information
- Current team: Pinhalnovense

Youth career
- 2008–2010: Sporting CP
- 2010–2011: Foot 21
- 2011: Corroios
- 2012: Estoril
- 2013–2014: Manchester City
- 2014–2015: Barnsley

Senior career*
Years	Team	Apps	(Gls)
2014–2016	Casa Pia	2	(2)
2017–2018	Cova da Piedade	5	(0)
2019	1º Dezembro	2	(0)
2019–2020	San Fernando	9	(1)
2020–	Pinhalnovense	9	(0)
- * Club domestic league appearances and goals as of 14 March 2021

Pedro Zêzere Neves Carneiro (born 25 November 1997) is a Portuguese footballer who plays for C.D. Pinhalnovense as a midfielder.

== Football career ==
On 23 July 2017, Carneiro made his professional debut with Cova da Piedade in a 2017–18 Taça da Liga match against Nacional.
