= Pedro Carneiro (musician) =

Portuguese musician (born 1975)

Pedro Carneiro (born June 5 1975) is a Portuguese solo classical percussionist, marimba player, composer, and conductor. Carneiro is one of the very few percussion players to have made an international career as a soloist, and has established himself as one of the world's foremost solo percussionists, performing regularly throughout Europe, Asia and the United States.

Carneiro has won several international competitions and awards, while performing regularly in festivals and venues such as the BBC Proms, Rhythm Sticks Festival, Queen Elisabeth Hall and Purcell Room in London, Sonorities Festival in Belfast, Macau International Music Festival, Grant Park Music Festival in Chicago, New Zealand International Festival of the Arts, Capital Theatre in Beijing, La Biennale di Venezia, Folles Journées (Lisbon), Schumannfest in Düsseldorf, Festival Classique au Vert in Paris, amongst others. Carneiro has also performed recitals in cities such as London, Paris, Los Angeles, Hanover, Seville, Lisbon, Seoul and Hong Kong.

Carneiro is a frequent guest soloist with numerous orchestras: BBC National Orchestra of Wales, London Mozart Players, Tampere Philharmonic Orchestra, Orquestra Sinfônica do Estado de São Paulo, Helsingborgs Symfoniorkester, Estonian National Symphony Orchestra, Lithuanian National Symphony Orchestra, Orquesta de la Comunidad de Madrid, Bilbao Symphony Orchestra, Orchestre Régional de Basse-Normandie, Gävle Symfoniorkester and Portuguese Symphony Orchestra, to name but a few, working with conductors such as Petri Sakari, John Neschling, Ronald Zollman, Kaspar de Roo, Jurjen Hempel, Olari Elts, Andrew Parrott, Juanjo Mena, António Saiote, José Ramón Encinar, John Storgårds, Hamish McKeich, Max Rabinovitsj, Sarah Ioannides and Joseph Swensen, amongst others.

Pedro Carneiro has been heard and seen on radio and television stations throughout the world as well as releasing several solo recordings. As a guest teacher, Pedro has given masterclasses in many prestigious conservatoires and universities, such as the Royal College of Music, Guildhall School of Music & Drama and Trinity College of Music in London, Hong Kong Academy for Performing Arts, São Paulo State University in Brazil and the Royal College of Music in Stockholm, to name but a few. He is the visiting professor of solo percussion studies at the Academia Nacional Superior de Orquestra in Lisbon.

Pedro Carneiro is the principal conductor and artistic director of the Portuguese Chamber Orchestra.
