= Ludovic Morlot =

French conductor (born 1973)

Ludovic Morlot (French: [lydɔvik mɔʁlo]; born 11 December 1973) is a French conductor.

== Early years ==
Morlot was born in Lyon on 11 December 1973. As a youth, he trained as a violinist. He later attended the Royal Academy of Music, and began his studies in conducting in London in 1994, where his mentors included Sir Colin Davis, George Hurst and Colin Metters. At the Royal College of Music, he was a Norman Del Mar conducting fellow. In the US, he attended the Pierre Monteux school for conductors. He held the Seiji Ozawa Fellowship in conducting at the Tanglewood festival in 2001.

== Professional career ==
From 2002 to 2004, Morlot served as conductor-in-residence with the Orchestre National de Lyon (ONL) under David Robertson, where his responsibilities included conducting the ONL's two youth orchestras. From 2004 to 2007, he was an assistant conductor with the Boston Symphony Orchestra, which he conducted for the first time in subscription concerts in April 2005.

Morlot's work in contemporary music has included conducting the US premieres of Gondwana by Tristan Murail, in January 2009, and Helios Choros II (Sun God Dancers) by Augusta Read Thomas in October 2009, and the world premiere of Instances, the last orchestral work by Elliott Carter.

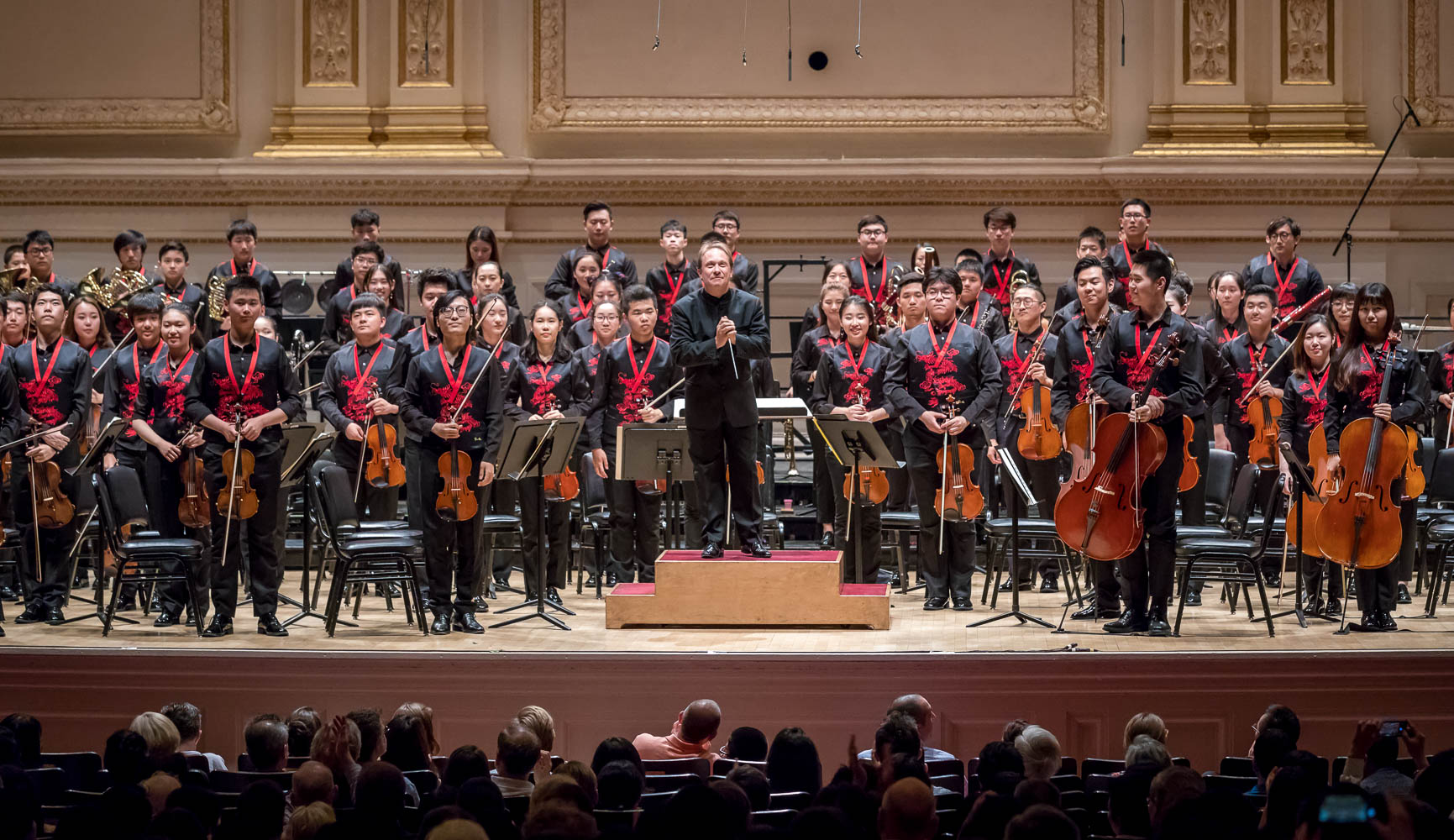
Ludovic Morlot with the National Youth Orchestra of China at Carnegie Hall on 22 July 2017.

Morlot first guest-conducted the Seattle Symphony in October 2009. His second guest appearance with the Seattle Symphony was in April 2010, as a substitute conductor following the 2010 Eyjafjallajökull eruptions, when he led a different program prepared with diminished rehearsal time. In June 2010, the Seattle Symphony announced the appointment of Morlot as its 15th music director, effective with the 2011–2012 season, with an initial contract of six years. He held the title of music director designate during the 2010–2011 season. In July 2015, the orchestra announced the extension of Morlot's contract through the 2018–2019 season. On 21 April 2017, the orchestra announced the conclusion of Morlot's music directorship at the end of the 2018–2019 season. Morlot now has the title of conductor emeritus with the Seattle Symphony.

Morlot made his first guest-conducting appearance at La Monnaie in 2011. In June 2011, La Monnaie announced Morlot's appointment as its next music director, as of the 2012–2013 season, with an initial contract of 5 years. The Seattle and Brussels positions represented Morlot's first music directorships of an orchestra and an opera company, respectively. In December 2014, citing artistic differences, Morlot resigned from the directorship at La Monnaie, effective 31 December 2014. He commented: "I feel that the orchestra and I have not managed to reach a consensus on an artistic vision, and therefore, for the sake of their development as well as my own, I have made this decision to stand down."

Morlot served as the conductor of the National Youth Orchestra of China during its inaugural concert tour in 2017, which included a performance with Yuja Wang at Carnegie Hall. He returned as conductor for its 2019 season with pianist Garrick Ohlsson. In January 2020, he was announced as the organization's Artistic Director. In November 2021, the Barcelona Symphony Orchestra and National Orchestra of Catalonia announced the appointment of Morlot as its next principal conductor, effective with the 2022–2023 season, with an initial contract of four seasons.

== Personal life ==
Morlot and his wife Ghizlane have two daughters, Nora and Iman. In March 2012, Morlot was named Affiliate Professor of Music at the University of Washington (UW). With the 2013–2014 academic year, Morlot became the chair of orchestral conducting studies at UW. In 2014, he was elected a Fellow of the Royal Academy of Music "in recognition of his significant contribution to music."

== Selected recordings ==
- Berlioz, Requiem, Seattle Simphony Choral, Seattle Pro Musica, conducted by Ludovic Morlot, Kenneth Tarver, tenor. 2 CD Seattle Symphony Media 2018

Cultural offices
Preceded by Kazushi Ono	Chief Conductor, La Monnaie; 2012–2014	Succeeded by Alain Altinoglu
Preceded by Kazushi Ono	Principal Conductor, Barcelona Symphony Orchestra and National Orchestra of Catalonia; 2015–present	Succeeded by incumbent
