= List of compositions by Leevi Madetoja =

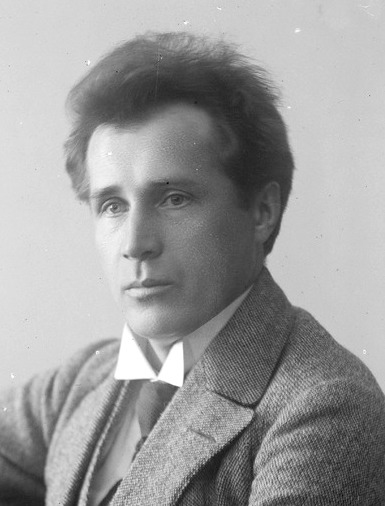
Madetoja (c. 1920)

The following is a list of compositions by Leevi Madetoja. In total, his oeuvre comprises 82 works with opus numbers and about 40 without. While Madetoja composed in all genres, he found his greatest success with the orchestra: symphonies, operas, cantatas, and orchestral miniatures all flowed from his pen. Curiously, he composed no concerti, although at various times in his career he hinted at plans for a violin concerto. Madetoja was also an accomplished composer for voice, as his numerous choral pieces and songs for voice and piano evidence; he found less success with—and composed sparingly for—solo piano. Finally, Madetoja wrote little for chamber ensemble after his student years, although it is unclear if this was due to insufficient skill or waning interest in the genre.

Today, Madetoja is primarily remembered for his set of three symphonies (1916, 1918, and 1926, respectively); two operas, The Ostrobothnians (1924) and Juha (1935); the ballet-pantomime, Okon Fuoko (1927); the Elegia from the Symphonic Suite (1909); the Kalevalic symphonic poem, Kullervo (1913); and, The Garden of Death (1918, r. 1919), a three-movement suite for solo piano. In the inventory that follows, the dates provided indicate the year of composition, unless otherwise preceded by an "r.", for revision; an "a.", for arrangement; or, an "fp.", for first performance. Where possible, names in the original Finnish are included, with English translations in parentheses.

At present, this list is incomplete, particularly in the songs and choral works subsections.

== Works for orchestra ==
=== Symphonies ===
- Op. 29: Symphony No. 1 in F major (1914–16); fp. 10 February 1916, Madetoja and Helsinki PO
  1. Allegro
  2. Lento misterioso
  3. Finale: Allegro vivace
- Op. 35: Symphony No. 2 in E♭ major (1916–18); fp. 17 December 1918, Robert Kajanus and Helsinki PO
  1. Allegro moderato —
  2. Andante
  3. Allegro non troppo —
  4. Epilogue: Andantino
- Op. 55: Symphony No. 3 in A major (1925–26); fp. 8 April 1926, Madetoja and Helsinki PO
  1. Andantino—Allegretto
  2. Adagio
  3. Allegro non troppo
  4. Pesante, tempo moderato—Allegretto
- (Lost): Symphony No. 4 (1930–38); reportedly lost in 1938 at a Paris railway station when Madetoja's suitcase was stolen

=== Stage ===
- Op. 5: Shakkipeli (Chess), incidental music to a play by Eino Leino (1910); fp. 15 February 1910, Madetoja & Apostol's Concert Orchestra
  1. Juhlamarssi (Festive March); see also composer's arrangements for solo piano and for seven horns
  2. Kansankarkelo (Revel)
  3. Miekkatanssi (Sword Dance)
  4. Menuetto
- Op. 45: Pohjalaisia (The Ostrobothnians), opera in 3 acts for soloists and orchestra; libretto by Madetoja, based on a play by Artturi Järviluoma (1918–23); fp. 25 October 1924, Finnish National Opera, Tauno Hannikainen & Helsinki PO
- Op. 58: Okon Fuoko, ballet-pantomime in 1 act for soprano, tenor, mixed chorus, and orchestra; libretto by Poul Knudsen (1925–27); fp. 12 February 1930, Finnish National Opera, Martti Similä & Helsinki PO
- Op. 74: Juha, opera in 3 acts (or 6 tableaux) for soloists and orchestra; libretto by Aino Ackté and Madetoja, based on a novel by Juhani Aho (1930–34); fp. 17 February 1935, Finnish National Opera, Armas Järnefelt & Helsinki PO

Also see:

- Incidental music for chamber ensemble

==== Excerpted suites ====
- Op. 52: Sarja oopperasta Pohjalaisia (The Ostrobothnians Suite), arranged from the opera by Madetoja (a. 1923); fp. 8 March 1923, Kajanus & Bergen SO
  1. Lakeus (Open Plain)
  2. Vangin laulu (Prisoner's Song); utilizes motifs from the Ostrobothnian folk song, Tuuli se taivutti koivun larvan (The Wind Bent the Birch)
  3. Häjyt (Thugs)
  4. Tulopeli (Arrival Reel)
  5. Hypyt (Dances)
- Op. 58: Sarja I musiikista balettiin Okon Fuoko (Okon Fuoko Suite No. 1), arranged from the ballet-pantomime by Madetoja (a. 1927); fp. 15 December 1927, Kajanus & Helsinki PO (Note: The Okon Fuoko Suite is played without pause; moreover, the score does not make the kind of clear divisions typical of a multi-movement suite and no titles are provided. Typically, however, conductors have recorded the suite across six tracks, although John Storgårds and the Helsinki PO take just four. For more, see Okon Fuoko discography.)
  1. Okon Fuoko, unitaikuri (The Dream Magician) —
  2. Vieraat saapuvat (Entrance of the Guests) —
  3. Nukkien tanssi (Dance of the Dolls) —
  4. Miehen tanssi (Man's Dance) —
  5. Naisen tanssi (Woman's Dance) —
  6. Irvokas tanssi (Danse grotesque)
- Op. 74: Sarja oopperasta Juha (Juha Suite), arranged from the opera by Madetoja (a. 1934); fp: ?
  1. Traagillinen episodi (Tragic Episode)
  2. Koskenlasku (Rapids Shooting)

Also see:

- Excerpted Okon Fuoko songs for soprano and orchestra and arrangement for soprano and piano

=== Other (without voice or chorus) ===
- Op. 4: Sinfoninen sarja (Symphonic Suite) (1909–10); fp. I: 10 January 1910, Kajanus & Helsinki PO; I–IV: 26 September 1910, Madetoja & Helsinki PO
  1. Elegia (Suru) jouisiorkesterille (for strings); often performed as a stand-alone piece
  2. Notturno (Nocturno)
  3. Pastorale (Salolla, Im Urwalde)
  4. Finale
- Op. 7: Konserttialkusoitto (Concert Overture) (1911); fp. 14 October 1913, Madetoja & Helsinki PO (Note: The catalogue of Madetoja's works compiled by Lauriala (2005) at madetoja.org incorrectly lists the premiere date for the Concert Overture, Op. 7, as 14 November 1913. Pulliainen (2000b), in the liner notes to Vol. 2 of Madetoja's complete orchestral works (Volmer & Oulu SO), also gets the date wrong, writing "Kajanus' Finnish Orchestra [Helsinki PO] gave the first performance ... on October 10, 1913 in Madetoja's second composition concert". This is clearly a typo, as Pulliainen gets the date of Madetoja's second composition concert, 14 October 1913, correct in the liner notes to Vol. 3. The catalogue by Salmenhaara (1987) is thus the only one to list the correct date of the Concert Overture's first performance, 14 October. Pesonen (1982) makes no mention of a premiere date.)
- Op. 11: Tanssinäky (Dance Vision), originally titled Öinen karkelokuva (Night Revels) (1911, r. 1919); fp. 24 October 1912, Madetoja & Helsinki PO
- Op. 12: Pieni sarja (Little Suite), composer's arrangement of Six Pieces for Piano (a. 1913–16); fp. I–III: 14 October 1913, Madetoja & Helsinki PO; IV–V: 5 March 1916, Madetoja & Viipuri Orchestra
  1. Valssi (Waltz)
  2. Laulelma
  3. Scherzino
  4. (Lost) Kehtolaulu (Cradle Song)
  5. (Lost) Menuetto (Minuet)
- Op. 15: Kullervo, symphonic poem (1913); fp. 14 October 1913, Madetoja & Helsinki PO
- Op. 17: Melodia ja Pieni romanssi (Melody and Little Romance), for strings, composer's arrangement of Piano Pieces (a. 1913); fp. 14 October 1913, Madetoja & Helsinki PO
  1. Olit minua lähinnä (You Were Closest to Me)
  2. Pieni romanssi (A Little Romance)
- Op. 34: Pastoraalisarja orkesterille (Pastorale Suite for Orchestra), composer's arrangement of Pastorale Suite for Piano (a. 1931?); fp. 29 December 1931, Toivo Haapanen & Finnish RSO
  1. Aamu (Morning)
  2. Caprice
  3. Legenda (Legend)
  4. Valssi (Waltz)
- Op. 53: Huvinäytelmäalkusoitto (Comedy Overture), overture to an abandoned opera, Nummisuutarit (1923); fp. 12 April 1923, Madetoja & Helsinki PO
- Op. 67b: Barcarola (Barcarole), composer's arrangement of Barcarole for brass ensemble (a. ?); fp.?
- Op. 77: Maalaiskuvia (Rural Pictures), suite from music to the film Taistelu Heikkilän talosta (Battle for the House of Heikkilä) (1936); fp. 4 March 1999, Arvo Volmer & Oulu SO
  1. Maisema (Landscape)
  2. Sunnuntaiaamu (Sunday Morning)
  3. Heinäväen polska (Dance of the Harvesters)
  4. (Unfinished) Markkinamarka (The Market Trip)

=== Cantatas ===
- Op. 10: Merikoski, cantata (for the 300th anniversary of Oulu City Schools) for mixed choir and orchestra, with text by V. A. Koskenniemi; composer's arrangement of Merikoski for mixed choir and piano (a. 1911); fp. ?
- Op. 22: Kantaatti Helsingin yliopiston promootioon 1914 (Promotion Cantata for the University of Helsinki 1914), cantata for soprano, mixed choir, and orchestra with text by Ernst Knape (Finnish trans. by Väinö Vesala) (1914); fp. 29 May 1914, Kajanus, Helsinki PO, & Suomen Laulu
  1. Maestoso non troppo lento
  2. L'istesso tempo
  3. Andantino
  4. Maestoso molto tranquillo —
  5. Ma tranquillo
  6. Maestoso
- Op. 47 (partially lost): Elämän päivät (The Days of Life), cantata for soprano, mixed choir, and orchestra with text by V. A. Koskenniemi (1920); fp. 15 February 1920, Madetoja, Helsinki PO, Suomen Laulu, & Aino Ackté (soprano)
  1. Leivosen aurinkolaulu
  2. Kyntäjäin laulu
  3. Heinäväen laulu
  4. Elomiehet
  5. Tähtilaulu
  6. Yö laulaa
- Op. 48 (partially lost): Napuen sankarien muistolle (To the Memory of the Heroes of Napue), cantata (in commemoration of the Battle of Isoviha) for unison choir and brass ensemble, with text by A. V. Koskimies (1920); fp. 10 July 1920
- Op. 59: Planeettain laulu (The Song of the Planets), cantata (for the promotion ceremony at the University of Turku) for soprano, mixed choir, and orchestra, with text by V. A. Koskenniemi (1927); fp. Turku, 12 May 1927, Madetoja & Helsinki PO
  1. Tähtien kuoro (Star Choir) – Allegro moderato
  2. Lasten kuoro (Children's Choir) – Allegretto
  3. Nuorukaisten ja neitojen kuoro (Young Men's and Maidens' Choir) – Largamente—Allegretto
  4. Vanhojen kuoro (Old Person's Choir) – Andante
  5. Tähtien kuoro (Star Choir) – Allegro moderato; same score as in I, but with different text
- Op. 63: Lux triumphans, cantata (for the centenary of the University of Helsinki) for soprano, mixed choir, and orchestra, with text by Otto Manninen (1928); fp. 1 October 1928, Madetoja, Helsinki PO, & Suomen Laulu (Note: Lauriala (2005) at madetoja.org lists the date of first performance as 1 November 1928, whereas Salmenhaara (1987) provides 1 October 1928.)
  1. Prologus (Lux triumphans)
  2. Ad manes et maiores (The Ghosts of Ancestors)
  3. Pro humanitate (For Humanity)
- Op. 64a: Suomi (Finland), cantata for mixed choir and orchestra, with text by Axel Juel; Finland's contribution to the Pohjoismaiden yhteisessä kantaatissa (Nordic Joint Cantata), Sangen i Norden (1929); fp. Copenhagen, 2 June 1929, Heikki Klemetti & Suomen Laulu; fp. in Finland, 6 March 1930, Madetoja, Helsinki PO, & Suomen Laulu (Note: As Salmenhaara (1987) makes clear in his biography of Madetoja, the Nordic Joint Cantata Sagen i Norden was first performed in Copenhagen on 2 June 1929; only later, in March 1930, did Madetoja himself conduct Finland's individual contribution in Finland. The catalogue of Madetoja's works edited by Pesonen (1982) thus is incorrect when it lists the date of first performance as 6 March 1929 in Helsinki, with Leevi Madetoja conducting the Helsinki PO and Suomen Laulu.)

Note: Additional national contributions by: Sigfús Einarsson (Iceland); Johan Halvorsen (Norway); Fini Henriques (Denmark); and, Kurt Atterberg (Sweden)

- Op. 70: Kantaatti Tampereen kaupungin 150-vuotisjuhlaan (Cantata for the 150th Anniversary of the City of Tampere), cantata for mixed choir, brass ensemble, and percussion, with text by Lauri Pohjanpää (1929); fp. 6 November 1929; S. B. Laundelin, Festival Choir, & Tampere Workers' Union brass band
  1. Näsijärven laineet
  2. Kosken laulu
  3. Tehtaanpiippujen kuoro
  4. Pyynikin laulu
  5. Pyhäjärven laineet
- Op. 73: Karitsan lippu, cantata (for the inauguration of the bishop of the Diocese of Tampere) for baritone, mixed choir, and organ, with text by L. Pohjanpää (1934); fp. Tampere, 10 June 1934, Choir of the Tampere Cathedral
  1. Hitaanpuoleinen tempo
  2. Andantino
  3. Poco allegro
- Op. 76: Väinämöisen soitto (Väinämöinen's Call), cantata (for the song and music festival in honor of the Kalevala centenary in Sortavala) for soprano, baritone, mixed choir, (Note: The catalogue of Madetoja's works compiled by Lauriala (2005) at madetoja.org incorrectly lists the choir accompaniment as "male", although the score available on the same website calls for mixed choir. Salmenhaara (1987) and Pesonen (1982) each correctly list the choir as mixed ("sekakuorolle").) and orchestra, with text from the Kalevala (1935); fp. I: Sortavala, 29 June 1935; I–II: 28 February 1936, Armas Järnefelt & Helsinki PO
  1. Kanteleen synty (Birth of the Kantele)
  2. Väinämöinen soittaa (Väinämöinen's Call)
- Op. 78: Lauluseppele (Wreath Song), cantata for baritone, male choir, and orchestra, with text by Lauri Pohjanpää; commissioned by YL Male Voice Choir for its 50th anniversary (1938); fp. 26 April 1947, YL Male Voice Choir
  1. Lauluseppele (Wreath Song)
  2. Serenadi (Serenade)
  3. Hymni isänmaalle (Hymn to the Fatherland)

=== Voice and orchestra ===
- Op. 9/5: Geisha, for soprano and orchestra, with text by L. Onerva; composer's arrangement of Geisha for soprano and piano (a. 1946); fp. ?
- Op. 24: Sammon ryöstö (The Abduction of The Sampo), symphonic poem for baritone, male choir, and orchestra, with text from the Kalevala (1915); fp. 16 April 1915, Heikki Klemetti, Helsinki PO, & YL Male Voice Choir
- Op. 27/2: Stabat Mater: Marian murhe (Mary's Sorrow), for female choir, strings and/or organ, with text by Jacopone da Todi (Finnish trans. by A. Ahlqvist-Oksanen) (1917); fp. 6 April 1917, Suomen Laulu
- Op. 37: Aslak Smaukka, symphonic poem for baritone, male choir, and orchestra, with text by Larin-Kyösti (1917); fp. 8 April 1926, Madetoja, Helsinki PO, & Laulu-Miehet
- Op. 40: Säestyksellisiä vokaaliteoksia (Vocal Works with Accompianment) (1917–18)
  1. Isänmaan virsi (Fatherland Hymn), for mixed choir, organ, and strings, with text by Niilo Mantere; fp. 13 November 1917, Suomen Laulu & Helsinki PO
  2. Tuhanten rantain partahilla (Morgonsång), for mixed choir and strings, with text by Zachris Topelius (Finnish trans. by Paavo Cajander); fp. 4 December 1918, Suomen Laulu
  3. Isänmaalle, for mixed choir and strings (or organ), with text by L. Onerva (1917); fp. ?
- Op. 42/1: Pellervon laulu, for mixed choir and orchestra ad lib., with text by Eino Leino (c. 1913); fp. ?; see also composer's arrangement for monophonic choir and brass septet
- Op. 42/2: Vapauden aamu, for male choir and orchestra, with text by L. Onerva (1917); fp. ?; see also composer's arrangement for male choir and piano
- Op. 42/5: Mies mieheltä, for male choir and orchestra, with text by Eino Leino; composer's arrangement of Mies mieheltä for male choir and brass ensemble (a. ?); fp. ?
- Op. 46: Väinämöisen kylvö (Väinämöinen Sows the Wilderness), symphonic poem for soprano (or tenor) and orchestra, with text from the Kalevala (1919–20); fp. 28 February 1920, Finnish National Theatre, Madetoja & Helsinki PO, Aino Ackté (soprano)
- Op. 50/4: Oma maa, for mixed choir and orchestra (ad lib.), with text by Samuel Berg ('Samuli Kustaa Kallio'); composer's arrangement of Oma maa for mixed choir (a. 1945); fp. ?
- Op. 58: Kaksi laulua Okon Fuokosta (Two Songs from Okon Fuoko), for soprano and orchestra, with text by Poul Knudsen; excerpted from the stage production's score by the composer (1927); fp. ?; see also composer's arrangement for soprano and piano
  1. Yiain laulu I (Yiai's First Song)
  2. Yiain laulu II (Yiai's Second Song)
- Op. 61: Pako Egyptiin (The Flight for Egypt), for soprano, mixed choir, organ, and strings, with text by L. Onerva (1924); fp. 7 February 1932, Madetoja & Sekakuoro Sirpaleet, Gösta Stråhle (soprano)
- Op. 68: Syksy (Autumn), song cycle for soprano and orchestra, with text by L. Onerva; composer's arrangement of Autumn for soprano and piano (a. 1940); fp. 27 December 1940, Toivo Haapanen, Helsinki PO, & Aune Antti (soprano)
  1. Syksy (Autumn)
  2. Lähtö (Leaving)
  3. Luulit, ma katselin sua (Why Do You Think That I Watched You)
  4. Hyvää yötä (Good Night)
  5. Lintu sininen (Blue Bird)
  6. Ijät hyrskyjä päin (Forever Against Storms)

Voice and orchestra (still to source)

- Op. 27/1 – Keväthymni (Spring Hymn), for mixed choir and organ (or harmonium; or piano) with text by L. Onerva (1912)
- Op. 42/4: Vapauden marssi, for voices and piano, with text by Eino Leino (1918); fp. ?
- Op. 72/1: Integer vitae, for mixed choir, woodwinds, and strings, with text by Horace (?); fp.
- Op. 72/2: Suomen itsenäisyyden kuusi (Finland's Independence), for baritone, mixed choir, and brass ensemble with text by Rudolf Ray (1931; 13 May 1931 Suomen Laulu & the White Guard brass band)

== Works for choir a cappella ==
=== Female choir ===
- Op. 28: Naiskuorolauluja (Songs for Female Choir) (1914–22); fp. ?
  1. Piika pikkarainen (1914), with text by Valter Juvelius (Valter Juva)
  2. Hakamaassa (1914), with text by L. Onerva
  3. Päivänlasku (1922), with text by L. Onerva

=== Mixed choir ===
- Op. 30a: Sekakuorolauluja (Songs for Mixed Choir), for mixed choir (1916–18); fp. various
  1. Hautalaulu (1916), with text by Viktor Rydberg (Finnish trans. L. Onerva); fp. 5 December 1916, Suomen Laulu
  2. Erkki-Paimen (1916), with text by Larin-Kyösti; fp. 5 December 1916, Suomen Laulu
  3. Etelä-Pohjanmaan laulu (1918), with text by Artturi Leinonen; fp. Lapua, 14 July 1918, Festival Choir
- Op. 30b: Sekakuorolauluja (Songs for Mixed Choir), for mixed choir (1911–20); fp. various
  1. Tuonen venho (1920), with text by L. Onerva; fp. Turku, 7 January 1921, Nuori Laulu
  2. Ei mitään multa puutu (Paimenpsalmi) (1911), with text form the Bible, Psalm 23; fp. ? (but Suomen Laulu holds the copyright)
  3. Tuolla taivaan asunnoissa (Tuolla ylhääll' asunnoissa) (1914), with text by Smo Korpela (Finnish Hymnal, No. 622); fp. 18 October 1914, Suomen Laulu
- Op. 50: Sekakuorolauluja (Songs for Mixed Choir), for mixed choir (1917–28); fp. various
  1. Kehtolaulu (1917), with text by Larin-Kyösti; fp. 15 March 1917, Helsingin Kansallismielisen nuorison sekakuoro
  2. Ihmisen henki (1921), with text by Arnold Kandolin ('Aarni Kouta'); fp. 18 November 1921, Suomen Laulu
  3. Kevätunta (1925), with text by L. Onerva; fp. Vaasa, Sekakuoro Sirpaleet 10th anniversary concert, 15 April 1926, Sekakuoro Sirpaleet
  4. Oma maa (1921), with text by Samuel Berg ('Samuli Kustaa Kallio'); fp. 18 November 1921, Suomen Laulu; see also composer's arrangement for mixed choir and orchestra
  5. Sypressiportilla (1928), with text by L. Onerva; fp. Vaasa, 7 April 1929, Sekakuoro Sirpaleet
- Op. 56: De profundis, for baritone and mixed choir, with text from the Bible, Psalm 130; composer's arrangement of De profundis for baritone and male choir (a. ?); fp. ?
  1. De profundis: Andante
  2. Si iniquitates: Lento (bartione solo)
  3. Speravit anima mea: Allegretto
  4. Quia apud Dominum: Andante sostenuto
- Op. 57: Kolme kansanlaulua sooloäänelle ja sekakuorolle (Three Folk Songs for Solo Voice and Mixed Choir), for mezzo-soprano and mixed choir (1924–27); fp. various
  1. Läksin minä kesäyönä käymään (1924), with text form the Kanteletar, 21 April 1924, Suomen Laulu
  2. Voi, jos ilta joutuisi (c. 1925), with text by ?; fp. 4 March 1927, Suomen Laulu
  3. Uni kysyy uunin päältä (1927), with text from the Kalevala; fp. 14 February 1928, Suomen Laulu
- Op. 82: Sekakuorolauluja (Songs for Mixed Choir), for mixed choir, with text by L. Onerva (1946); fp. various
  1. Keinutan kaikua; fp. ? (but Suomen Laulu holds the copyright)
  2. Vanha luostari (The Old Monastery), for soprano and mixed choir; fp. 30 November 1947, Suomen Laulu
- Op. 13: Sekakuorolauluja (Songs for Mixed Choir) (1910–14)
  1. En blomma (Kukka haudalla) (1910), with text by Viktor Rydberg (Finnish trans. by Heikki Klemetti); fp. Tampere, 10 December 1911, Suomen Laulu
  2. Onnelliset (1911), with text by Aleksis Kivi; fp. 26 April 1912, Suomen Laulu
  3. Katson virran kalvohon (1912), with text by V.A. Koskenniemi
  4. Kuu kalpea (1912–13), with text by Eino Leino; fp. 18 April 1914, Dagmar Klmetti & Helsingin Kansallismielisen nuorison sekakuoro (Helsinki National Youth Mixed Choir)
  5. Mitä tuosta, jos mä laulan (1912), with text from the Kanteletar; fp. Viipuri, 7 March 1915, Emil Sivori & Karjalan kaiku (Karelia Echo)
  6. Metsän kuninkaalle (1914), with text from the Kanteletar; fp. Viipuri, 7 March 1915, Emil Sivori & Karjalan kaiku (Karelia Echo)

=== Male choir ===
The complete songs for unaccompanied male choir have been recorded by the YL Male Voice Choir under the Finlandia Label, over three volumes. In the list that follows, '*' signifies a song on Vol. I, '†' a song on Vol. II, and '‡' a song on Vol. III.

- Op. 8: Mieskuorosävellyksiä (Songs for Male Voice Choir) (1908–14); fp. various
  1. Venelaulu (Purrelle tuulta, Speak, Wind, to My Sail) (1908), with text from the Kanteletar; fp. ? *
  2. Armas arkussa ajavi (In His Coffin Lies My Love) (1908), with text from the Kanteletar; fp. 26 April 1934, YL Male Voice Choir *
  3. Soitappas soria likka (Play, Pretty Maid) (1909), with text from the Kanteletar; fp. 4 December 1909, YL Male Voice Choir *
  4. Kehtolaulu (Lullaby) (1910), with text from the Kanteletar; fp. 22 April 1910, YL Male Voice Choir *
  5. Valkeat kaupungit (White Cities) (1909, r. 1932), with text by V. A. Koskenniemi; fp. 23 April 1909, YL Male Voice Choir *
  6. Rannalta (On the Shore) (1911), with text by V. A. Koskenniemi (1911); fp. 1 December 1911, YL Male Voice Choir *
  7. Kevät keralla päiväin kuulakkain (On a Clear Day In Spring) (1911), with text by V. A. Koskenniemi; 1 December 1911, YL Male Voice Choir *
  8. Kymmenen virran maa (The Land of the Ten Mighty Streams) (1913), with text by August Koskimies; fp. 27 November 1913, YL Male Voice Choir *
  9. Korvessa (In the Wilds) (1914), with text by Larin-Kyösti; fp. 1914, Muntra Musikanter) *
- Op. 23: Mieskuorolauluja (Songs for Male Voice Choir), for male choir (and baritone solo, VI, IX–X) (1912–16); fp. various
  1. Megairan laulu (Megaera's Song) (1912), with text by L. Onerva; fp. 29 November 1912, YL Male Voice Choir *
  2. Talvinen Tiber (The Tiber In Winter) (1915), with text by L. Onerva; fp. 27 April 1937, Yl Male Voice Choir *
  3. Suvi-illan vieno tuuli (The Gentle Summer Breeze) (1913), with text by Eino Leino; fp. 6 April 1913, YL Male Voice Choir *
  4. Hautalaulu (Lament) (1913), with text by Eino Leino; fp. 20 April 1914, YL Male Voice Choir *
  5. Mirjamin laulu (Mirjam's Song) (1912), with text by Eino Leino; fp. 20 April 1912, YL Male Voice Choir *
  6. Paimentyttö (The Shepherdess) (1915), with text by Rafael Hertzberg (Finnish trans. by Paavo Cajander); fp. 11 April 1916, YL Male Voice Choir *
  7. Limokujassa (In the Grove) (1916), with text by Larin-Kyösti; fp. 11 April 1916, YL Male Voice Choir *
  8. Mittumaaritulilla (By the Midsummer Fire) (1915), with text by Larin-Kyösti; fp. 3 March 1916, Laulu-Miehet *
  9. Hämärän ääniä (Dusk) (1916), with text by Larin-Kyösti; fp. 29 November 1916, YL Male Voice Choir *
- Op. 26/3: Majan ma tahtoisin rakentaa (I Would Build a Hut), for tenor and male choir, with text by Larin-Kyösti; composer's arrangement of Majan ma tahtoisin rakentaa for voice and piano (a. 1914); fp. ? *
- Op. 33: Mieskuorolauluja (Songs for Male Voice Choir), for male choir (1916–24); fp. various
  1. Iltatunnelma (Evening Mood) (1916), with text by Eino Leino; 2 April 1917, Laulu-Miehet †
  2. Det skönaste landet (Kaunehin maa, Most Beautiful of Lands) (1916, r. 1922), with text by Bertel Gripenberg (Finnish trans. by Eino Leino); fp. Viipuri, 29 March 1919 Viipurin Lauluveikot †
  3. Høstaften (Syysilta, Autumn Evening) (1916), with text by Holger Drachmann (Finnish trans. by Eino Leino); Viipuri, 29 March 1919, Viipurin Lauluveikot †
  4. Ikävyys (Melancholy) (1916), with text by Larin-Kyösti; fp. ? (but Viipurin Lauluveikot holds the copyright) †
  5. Soita somer, helkä hiekka (Play Gravel, Sing Sand) (1917), with text by Eino Leino; fp. 27 April 1917, YL Male Voice Choir †
  6. Unetar (1917), with text by Larin-Kyösti; fp. ? (but YL Male Voice Choir holds the copyright) †
  7. Turun Laulun Ystävien lippulaulu (Turku Friends Flag Anthem) (1919), with text by Enzio Borg; fp. ?
  8. Viipurin marssi (Viipuri March) (c. 1919), with text by Eero Eerola; fp. 25 April 1924, YL Male Voice Choir †
- Op. 39: Mieskuorolauluja (Songs for Male Voice Choir), for male choir (1919–21); fp. various
  1. Hän veitikka on pieno (She Is a Winsome Wee Thing) (1919), with text by Robert Burns (Finnish trans. by V. Juva); fp. 16 April 1920, YL Male Voice Choir †
  2. Elli Dunbar (1920), with text by Robert Burns (Finnish trans. by V. Juva); fp. 24 April 1925, YL Male Voice Choir †
  3. Tallinna Meestelauluseltsi lipulaul (Talliin Male Voice Choral Society Flag Anthem) (1919), with text by Peeter Grünfeldt; fp. ? (but YL Male Voice Choir holds the copyright) †
  4. Savon kyntäjän marssi (March of the Savo Ploughman) (1921), with text by A.E. Miettinen; fp. ? †
  5. Väinölän lapset (Väinölä's Children) (1921), with text by Arvid Genetz ('Arvi Jännes'); fp. 22 April 1921, YL Male Voice Choir †
- Op. 56: De profundis, for baritone and male choir, with text from the Bible, Psalm 130 (1925); fp. 23 March 1926, Väinö Rautavaara (baritone) & Laulu-Miehet; see also composer's arrangement for baritone and mixed choir †
  1. De profundis: Andante
  2. Si iniquitates: Lento (bartione solo)
  3. Speravit anima mea: Allegretto
  4. Quia apud Dominum: Andante sostenuto
- Op. 62: Mieskuorolauluja (Songs for Male Voice Choir), for male choir (1925–28); fp. various
  1. Elegia (Elegy) (c. 1928), with text by Eino Leino; fp. ? (but Muntra Musikanter holds the copyright) †
  2. Kodista erotessa (Im schönsten Wiesengrunde, In the Loveliest Meadow) (1928), with text from a German folk song; fp. 10 May 1928, Muntra Musikanter ‡
  3. Hiiren peiaat (The Mouse's Funeral Feast) (1925), with text from the Kanteletarl fp. 26 April 1929, YL Male Voice Choir ‡
- Op. 66: Mieskuorolauluja (Songs for Male Voice Choir), for male choir, with text by Sandor Petöfi (Finnish trans. Otto Manninen) (1924–29); fp. various
  1. Kuljen, soittoniekat myötä (I Join the Fiddlers) (1924); fp. 25 November 1924, YL Male Voice Choir ‡
  2. Puron heljät helmet (The Pearls of the Brook) (1924); fp. 14 April 1932, Laulu-Miehet ‡
  3. Etelkalle (To Etelka) (1929); fp. 26 April 1929, YL Male Voice Choir ‡
- Op. 81: Kuorolauluja (Choir Songs), for male choir (1945–46), fp. various
  1. Tupa tanssia kysyvi (The Room Awaits the Dancers) (1946), with text from an Estonian folk poem (Finnish trans. by A.O. Väisänen); fp. ? ‡
  2. Heläjä, heläjä ilma (Ring, Ring Air) (1946), with text from an Estonian folk poem (Finnish trans. by A.O. Väisänen); fp. ? ‡
  3. Hän kulkevi kuin yli kukkien (She Ran O'er the Flowers) (1945), with text by Eino Leino; fp. 5 April 1946, YL Male Voice Choir ‡
  4. Niin jos oisit lauluni (If You Were My Songs) (1945), with text by Eino Leino; fp. 26 April 1947, YL Male Voice Choir ‡
  5. Aamulaulu (Morning Song) (1946), with text by Eino Leino; fp. 17 April 1947, Laulu-Miehet ‡
  6. Kuka on hän? (Who Is She?) (1946), with text by Eino Leino; fp. 24 April 1954, Laulu-Miehet ‡
  7. Ilta (Evening) (1946), with text by L. Onerva; fp. Kuopio, 18 April 1947, Puijon Laulu ‡
- [WoO]: Land i vår sång (Laulumme maa or The Land In Our Song), for male choir, with text by J. Rundt (Finnish trans. by L. Onerva) (1939); fp. ? ‡
- [WoO]: Paimenen laulu (Shepherd's Song), for male choir, with text by J.H. Erkko (1914); fp. 25 April 1914, YL Male Voice Choir ‡

also on Vol. I: Op. 30b/3 – Tuolla ylhaal asunnoissa (Up There In the Mansions)

also on Vol. II: Op. 57/1 – Läksin minä kesäyönä käymään (One Night in Summer)

also on Vol. III: Lauluseppele (A Garland of Song): 1) Muistojen laulu (Song of Memories), 2) Serenadi (Serenade), and 3) Hymni Isänmaalle (Hymn to the Fatherland)

== Works for solo instrument ==
=== Piano ===
- Op. 5/1: Juhlamarssi (Festive March), for solo piano (a. ?); fp. ?; composer's arrangement of Juhlamarssi for orchestra
- Op. 12: Kuusi pianokappaletta (Six Pieces for Piano) (1911–12); fp. ?; see also composer's arrangement for orchestra of I–V
  1. Valssi (Waltz)
  2. Kansanlaulu (Folk Song)
  3. Scherzino
  4. Kehtolaulu (Cradle Song)
  5. Menuetto vanhaan tyyliin (Minuet in the Old Style)
  6. Romanssi (Romance)
- Op. 17: Pianosävellyksiä (Piano Pieces) (1912); fp. ?; see also composer's arrangement for strings of I–II
  1. Olit minua lähinnä (You Were Closest to Me)
  2. Pieni romanssi (A Little Romance)
  3. Tanssi (Dance)
- Op. 21: Pienoiskuvia pianolle (Miniatures for Piano) (1914); fp. ?
  1. Iltatähti (The Evening Star)
  2. Valsette
  3. Nocturne
  4. Leikki (The Game)
  5. Lasten marssi (Children's March)
- Op. 31: Pieniä kappaleita pianolle (Four Small Pieces for Piano) (1915); fp. ?
  1. Paimenen unelma (The Shepherd's Dream)
  2. Prélude
  3. Pieni satu (A Little Tale) *
  4. Vanha muisto (A Reminiscence)
- Op. 32: Kaksi melodraama pianon säestyksellä (Two Melodrama with Piano Accompaniment), for reciter and piano (1916); fp. Oulu, 8 October 1916, L. Onerva (reciter) & Madetoja (piano)
  1. (lost) Prometheus, to a poem by Johann Wolfgang von Goethe (Finnish trans. by Eino Leino)
  2. Pilvilinnat (Castle in the Clouds), with text by L. Onerva
- Op. 34: Pastoraalisarja pianolle (Pastorale Suite for Piano) (1916); fp. ?; see also composer's arrangement for orchestra of I–IV
  1. Aamu (Morning)
  2. Caprice
  3. Legenda (Legend)
  4. Valssi (Waltz)
- Op. 41: Kuoleman puutarha (The Garden of Death or Jardin de la mort), suite for piano (1918, r. 1919); fp. 19 March 1923, Elli Rängman-Björlin (piano)
  1. Andante; originally the only movement, published separately in Lumikukkia magazine in 1918
  2. Poco lento
  3. Berceuse (Sostenuto ma non troppo)
- Op. 65: Pianosävellyksiä (Pieces for Piano) (1928–41); fp. ?
  1. Andantino (1931); Madetoja's arrangement for orchestra unfinished
  2. Tempo di menuetto (1931); Madetoja's arrangement for orchestra unfinished
  3. Canzonetta (1928)
  4. Gavotte (1928)
  5. Allegro scherzando (1942)
- [WoO]: Kehtolaulu (Berceuse) (1915)

== Works for voice and piano ==
=== Solo voice ===
From 2001–02, Gabriel Suovanen (baritone) and Helena Juntunen (soprano) recorded the complete songs for solo voice and piano under the Ondine label (piano accompaniment: Gustav Djupsjöbacka). In the list that follows, '*' signifies a soprano recording and '†' a baritone recording. Note, however, that many of Madetoja's songs can be sung by either male or female voice.

- Op. 2: Yksinlauluja pianon säestyksellä (Solo Songs with Piano Accompaniment), for voice and piano (1908–15); I–II: fp. 14 December 1908, Elli Salminen (soprano) & Leevi Madetoja (piano); first public performance of Madetoja's works; III–IV: fp. ?
  1. Lähdettyäs (Since Thou Didst Leave) (1908), with text by V.A. Koskenniemi †
  2. Yksin (Alone) (1908), with text by V.A. Koskenniemi †
  3. Talviaamu (Winter Morning) (c. 1909), with text by V.A. Koskenniemi †
  4. Tähtitaivas (Starry Sky) (c. 1915), with text by Zachris Topelius (Finnish trans. by Pablo Cajander) †
- Op. 9: Yksinlauluja pianon säestyksellä (Solo Songs with Piano Accompaniment), for voice and piano, with text by L. Onerva (1909–11); I & III: fp. 31 October 1912, Alma Silventoinen (soprano); II: fp. 16 September 1913, Ida Edkam (soprano) & Karl Ekman (piano); IV–V: fp. ?
  1. Yrtit tummat (Dark-Hued Leaves) (1911) †
  2. Hymyi Hypnos (Hypnos Smiled) (1911) *
  3. Tule kanssani (Take My Hand) (1911) *
  4. (unfinished) Rukous (Prayer) (c. 1909–10) *
  5. Geisha (1911); see also composer's arrangement orchestra *
- Op. 16: Yksinlauluja pianon säestyksellä (Solo Songs with Piano Accompaniment), for voice and piano (1912); fp. I: 9 March 1914, Alma Silventoinen (soprano); II–III: fp. ?
  1. Serenaadi (Serenade), with text by Eino Leino †
  2. Kristallikukkia (Crystal Flowers), with text by Larin-Kyösti *
  3. Kehtolaulu (Lullaby), with text by Lauri Pohjanpää *
- Op. 18: Viisi pohjois-pohjalasia kansanlauluja (Five Folk Songs from Northern Ostrobothnia), for voice (or violin) and piano (1913); fp. ?
  1. Linnut ne laulaa (The Birds Sing) †
  2. Ajetaanpa poijat (Let's Ride in a Cart, Boys) †
  3. Mamma se luuli (My Mother Thought) †
  4. Mammanpoika se pulska (A Mother's Son So Plump) †
  5. Kapakasta kapakkaan (From Tavern to Tavern) †
- Op. 20b: Nuorison lauluja pianon säestyksellä (Songs of Youth with Piano Accompaniment), for voice and piano (1913); fp. ?
  1. Suksimiesten laulu (Song of the Skiers), with text by Julius Krohn ("Suonio") †
  2. Suomen soitto (The Music of Finland), with text by J.H. Erkko †
  3. Kosiovarsa (A Foal for Wooing), with text by Larin-Kyösti †
  4. Toisen oma (Someone Else's Own), with text by Ilmari Kianto †
  5. Joululaulu (Christmas Song), with text by Alpo Noponen †
  6. Ota se kaunis kannel taas (Take Up That Fair Kantele Again), with text by Larin-Kyösti †
- Op. 25: Yksinlauluja pianon säestyksellä (Solo Songs with Piano Accompaniment), for voice and piano (1914–15); fp. ?
  1. Taas kaukaa laulavat lauluaan (1915) (From Afar I Hear Them Singing), with text by L. Onerva †
  2. Talvinen tie (Wintry Road) (1915), with text by L. Onerva †
  3. Tuulinen sää (Windy Weather) (1915), with text by L. Onerva *
  4. Synnyinmaja (Birth Cottage) (1914), with text by Larin-Kyösti †
  5. Itkisit joskus illoin (Sometimes Weeping in the Evening) (1915), with text by Larin-Kyösti †
- Op. 26: Yksinlauluja pianon säestyksellä (Solo Songs with Piano Accompaniment), for voice and piano (1914–16); fp. ?
  1. Jää hyvästi (Farewell) (1915), with text by L. Onerva *
  2. Vieno siipi (Soft Wing) (1915), with text by L. Onerva *
  3. Majan mä tahtoisin rakentaa (I Would Build a Hut) (1914), with text by Larin-Kyösti; see also composer's arrangement for tenor and male choir †
  4. Merituuli (Sea Wind) (1916), with text by L. Onerva *
  5. Talvikuutamolla (By Winter Moonlight) (1916), with text by Larin-Kyösti *
- Op. 36: Sanaton romanssi (Romance Without Words or Romance sans paroles), for voice and piano, with text by Paul Verlaine (Finnish trans. L. Onerva) (1916); fp. 13 July 1916, Helsingin Uusi Musiikkikauppa *
- Op. 42/3: Kansanvalta, for voice and piano, with text by Eino Leino; composer's arrangement of Kansanvalta for male choir and brass septet (a. ?); fp. ?
- Op. 44: Fire Sange (Four Songs or Neljä laulua), for voice and piano (1919); II–IV: fp. 5 March 1920, Alma Kuula (soprano); I: fp. ?
  1. Sang bag Ploven (Song at the Plough; Auran takana), with text by Ludvig Holstein (Finnish trans. by L. Onerva) †
  2. Far, hvor flyer svanerne hen? (Father, Whither Fly the Swans?; Taatto, minne liitävät joutsenet nuo?), with text by Ludvig Holstein (Finnish trans. by L. Onerva) *
  3. Det gyldenhvide Himmellys (The Golden-white Light of Heaven; Iltataivas), with text by Ludvig Holstein (Finnish trans. by L. Onerva) *
  4. Vaarsang (Spring Song; Kevätlaulu), with text by Sophus Michaelis (Finnish trans. by L. Onerva) *
- Op. 49: Yksinlauluja pianon säestyksellä (Solo Songs with Piano Accompaniment), for voice and piano (1920); fp. Turku, 28 February 1920, Väinö Sola (baritone)
  1. Terve päivä Pohjolahan (Hail, O Daylight in the North), with text by Eino Leino †
  2. Suomen puu (Finland's Tree), with text by L. Onerva †
- Op. 58: Kaksi laulua Okon Fuokosta (Two Songs from Okon Fuoko), for soprano and piano, with text by Poul Knudsen (Finnish trans. by Jalmari Lahdensuo); composer's arrangement of the two songs for soprano and orchestra (a. 1945); fp. 10 March 1929, Olli Sikaniemi (soprano)
  1. Yiain laulu I (Yiai's First Song) *
  2. Yiain laulu II (Yiai's Second Song) *
- Op. 60: Yksinlauluja pianon säestyksellä (Solo Songs with Piano Accompaniment), for voice and piano, with text by L. Onerva (1921–34); II: fp. 29 October 1924, Alma Kuula (soprano); III: fp. 26 February 1934, Alma Kuula; I: fp. ?
  1. Heijaa, heijaa (Swing, Swing) (1921) *
  2. Kaihoni (My Longing) (c. 1921) †
  3. Ilta (Evening) (1934) †
- Op. 68: Syksy (Autumn), song cycle for soprano and piano, with text by L. Onerva (1919–34); I: fp. 6 May 1930, Alma Kuula; I–IV: fp. 29 January 1932, Aune Varmavuori-Poijärvi; see also composer's arrangement for soprano and orchestra
  1. Syksy (Autumn) (1919) *
  2. Lähtö (Leaving) (1930) *
  3. Luulit, ma katselin sua (Why Do You Think That I Watched You) (1930) *
  4. Hyvää yötä (Good Night) (1926) *
  5. Lintu sininen (Blue Bird) (1919) *
  6. Ijät hyrskyjä päin (Forever Against Storms) (1930) *
- Op. 71: Yksinlauluja pianon säestyksellä (Solo Songs with Piano Accompaniment), for voice and piano (1925–29); fp. ?
  1. Kotihin mielin (I Want to Go Home) (1929), with text by Karl von Gerok (Finnish trans. by H. Haahti) †
  2. Mestarin käsky (The Word of the Master) (1925), with text by Jiddu Krishnamurti ("Alcyone") (Finnish trans. by Armas Rankka); commissioned for the Finnish Theosophical Society's 50th anniversary †
- [WoO]: Kaksi laulua näytelmään Vuoksen varrella (Two Songs from the Play "On the Banks of the Vuoksi River"), for voice and piano, with text by M. Vuori (1910); fp. ?
  1. Uskottomalle (To an Unfaithful One) *
  2. Vihurin laulu (Song of the Winter Wind) †
- [WoO]: Land i vår sång (Land in Our Song), with text by J. Rundt (Finnish trans. by L. Onerva) (1939) †
- [WoO]: Puhjetessa kukka puhtain (A Flower Is Purest When Opening), for voice and piano, with text by J.H. Erkko (date: ?) †

=== Multiple voices ===
- Op. 10: Merikoski, cantata (for the 300th anniversary of Oulu City Schools) for mixed choir and piano, with text by V.A. Koskenniemi (1911); fp. Oulu, 29 September 1911, Madetoja conducting; see also composer's arrangement for mixed choir and orchestra
- Op. 42/2: Vapauden aamu, for male choir and piano, with text by L. Onerva; composer's arrangement of Vapauden aamu for male choir and orchestra (a. ?); fp. ?
- Op. 42/5: Mies mieheltä, for male voices (or solo voice) and piano, with text by Eino Leino; composer's arrangement of Mies mieheltä for male choir and brass ensemble (a. ?); fp. ?
- Op. 43: Duettoja pianon säestyksellä (Duets with Piano Accompaniment), for two voices and piano (1919); fp. ?
  1. Iltakuva, with text by L. Onerva
  2. Kevättalvella, with text by Juhani Siljo
  3. Syyshuokaus, with text by L. Onerva
  4. Toukokuussa, with text by Juhani Siljo

== Works for chamber ensemble ==
- Op. 1: Trio viululle, sellolle ja pianolle (Trio for Violin, Cello, and Piano) (1909); fp. I–II: 25 September 1909, Karl Ekman (piano), Viktor Novácek (violin), & Bror Persfelt (cello); I–III: 18 October 1909
  1. Allegro energico
  2. Andante, non troppo sostenuto
  3. Allegro vivace
- Op. 3: Kaksi kappaletta viululle ja pianolle (Two pieces for Violin and Piano) (1909); fp. I: 7 September 1909, Heikki Kansanen (violin) & Oskar Merikanto (piano); II: 26 September 1910, Viktor Novácek (violin) & Oskar Merikanto (piano)
  1. Ballaadi (Ballad)
  2. Scherzo
- Op. 5/1: Juhlamarssi (Festive March), for seven horns (a. ?); fp. ?; composer's arrangement of Juhlamarssi for orchestra
- Op. 14: Sävellyksiä viululle ja pianolle (Works for Violin and Piano) (1909–12); fp. 11 December 1909, Viktor Novácek (violin) & Karl Ekman (piano)
  1. Kansanlaulu (Surullinen laulu) (1912)
  2. Suru (Elegia) (c. 1910)
  3. Menuetti (Minuet) (1912)
  4. Unikuva (1912)
  5. Karkelo (Tanssi) (1909)
- Op. 19: Sonatiini viululle ja pianolle (Sonatina for Violin and Piano) in B♭ major (1913); fp. 5 July 1913, Eelis Jurva (violin) & Leevi Madetoja (piano)
  1. Allegro molto moderato
  2. Lento moderato
  3. Finale: Allegro vivace (Perpetuum mobile)
- Op. 38: Romances intimes, for violin and piano (1917); fp. ?
  1. Rêverie (Unelma)
  2. Canzone (Canzonetta)
  3. Tempo di minuetto
  4. Ballade (Ballad)
- Op. 42/1: Pellervon laulu, for monophonic choir and brass septet, with text by Eino Leino; composer's arrangement of Pellervon laulu for mixed choir and orchestra (a. ?); fp. ?
- Op. 42/3: Kansanvalta, for male choir and brass septet, with text by Eino Leino (1913); fp. ?; see also composer's arrangement for voice and piano
- Op. 42/5: Mies mieheltä, for male choir and brass ensemble, with text by Eino Leino (1919); fp. ?; see also composer's arrangements for male choir and orchestra and for male voices (or solo voice) and piano
- Op. 51: Lyyrillinen sarja (Lyric Suite), for cello and piano (1922); fp. Kalevala Society Day celebrations, 28 February 1922, Yrjö Selin (cello) & Margaret Kilpinen (piano)
  1. Maisema (Landscape)
  2. Aamu (Morning)
  3. Kaihomieli (Nostalgic Singing)
  4. Karkelo (Caprice)
- Op. 64b: Vanhoja kansantansseja (Old Folk Dances), for clarinet and string quintet (1929); also arranged for clarinet, violin, and piano
  1. Polska (Polka) I
  2. Polska (Polka) II
- Op. 67: Sävellyksiä torviseitsikolle (Compositions for Seven Horns) (1912–29)
  1. Intermezzo, for brass ensemble (1912); fp: Savonlinna, 5 July 1913
  2. Barcarola (Barcarole), for brass ensemble and percussion (1929); fp: Helsinki Song and Play Festival, 1931; see also composer's arrangement for orchestra
  3. Tanssilaulu (Dance Song), for brass ensemble and percussion (1929)
- Op. 69: Alkusoitto-fantasia, for brass ensemble and percussion (1930); fp: Helsinki Song and Play Festival, 1931
- [WoO]: Melodia intima, for violin and piano (1923); fp: Oulu, 22 April 1945, Urpo Pesonen (violin) & Olavi Pesonen (piano)

=== Stage ===
- Op. 6: Alkibiades, incidental music to a play by Eino Leino, for reciter, flute, oboe, cello, and harp (1910); fp. Finnish National Theatre, 27 April 1910
  1. Timandran laulu (Timandra's Song) — Andante sostenuto; for reciter, flute, and harp (or violin and piano)
  2. Alkibiadeen näky; for reciter, flute, oboe, and harp (or violin and piano)
  3. Juhlaleikki (Party Games) — Allegro; for reciter and harp
  4. Theanon laulu (Theano's Song) — Allegro agitato; for reciter, flute, oboe, cello, and harp
  5. Rukous (Prayer); for reciter, flute, oboe, and harp (or two violins and piano)
- Op. 75a: Elämä on unta (Life Is a Dream), incidental music to a play by Pedro Calderon, for chamber ensemble (1939); fp. Finnish National Theatre, 8 February 1939
- Op. 75b: Kuningas Oidipus (Oedipus Rex), incidental music to a play by Sophocles, for chamber ensemble and choir (1936); fp. Finnish National Theatre, 30 December 1936
- Op. 80: Antonius ja Kleopatra (Antony and Cleopatra), incidental music to a play by William Shakespeare, for chamber ensemble and unison choir (1944); fp. Finnish National Theatre, 28 January 1944

Also see:

- Incidental music for orchestra (includes opera)

== Notes, references, and sources ==
=== Sources ===
- Finnish National Opera (1924). "Pohjalaisia Oct 25, 1924: Information on performance". encore.opera.fi (in Finnish).
- Finnish National Opera (1930). "Okon Fuoko Feb 12, 1930: Information on performance". encore.opera.fi (in Finnish).
- Finnish National Opera (1935). "Juha Feb 17, 1935: Information on performance". encore.opera.fi (in Finnish).
- Karjalainen, Kauko. "Leevi Madetoja". In Pesonen (1982).
- Korhonen, Kimmo (2007). Inventing Finnish Music: Contemporary Composers from Medieval to Modern. Finnish Music Information Center (FIMIC). ISBN 978-952-5076-61-5.
- Lauriala, Miika (2005). "The Works of Leevi Madetoja". madetoja.org (Music Finland).
- Pesonen, Olavi [in Finnish], ed. (1982). "Teosluettelo" [Catalogue of Works]. Leevi Madetoja: Teokset [Leevi Madetoja: Works] (in Finnish). Helsinki: Suomen Säveltäjät [Society of Finnish Composers]. ISBN 951-99388-4-2.
- Pulliainen, Riitta (2000b). Madetoja Orchestral Works 2: The Spirit Home of My Soul (booklet). Arvo Volmer & Oulu Symphony Orchestra. Tampere, Finland: Alba. p. 4–6. ABCD 144.
- Pulliainen, Riitta (2000c). Madetoja Orchestral Works 3: The Infinity of Fantasy (booklet). Arvo Volmer & Oulu Symphony Orchestra. Tampere, Finland: Alba. p. 4–6. ABCD 156.
- Rännäli, Mika (2000). Intimate Garden: Leevi Madetoja Complete Piano Works (booklet). Mika Rännäli. Tampere, Finland: Alba. p. 4–8. ABCD 206.
- Salmenhaara, Erkki (1987). Leevi Madetoja (in Finnish). Helsinki: Tammi. ISBN 951-30-6725-4.
