= Kuula =

Surname list

Kuula is a surname. Notable people with the surname include:

- Alma Kuula (1884–1941), Finnish singer
- Heikki Kuula (born 1983), Finnish rapper, record producer, and graphic designer
- Toivo Kuula (1883–1918), Finnish composer and conductor

== See also ==
- Kuula (song) by Ott Lepland
- Kuula (software)
