= Symphony No. 3 (Madetoja) =

Symphony in four movements by Leevi Madetoja

- by Leevi Madetoja
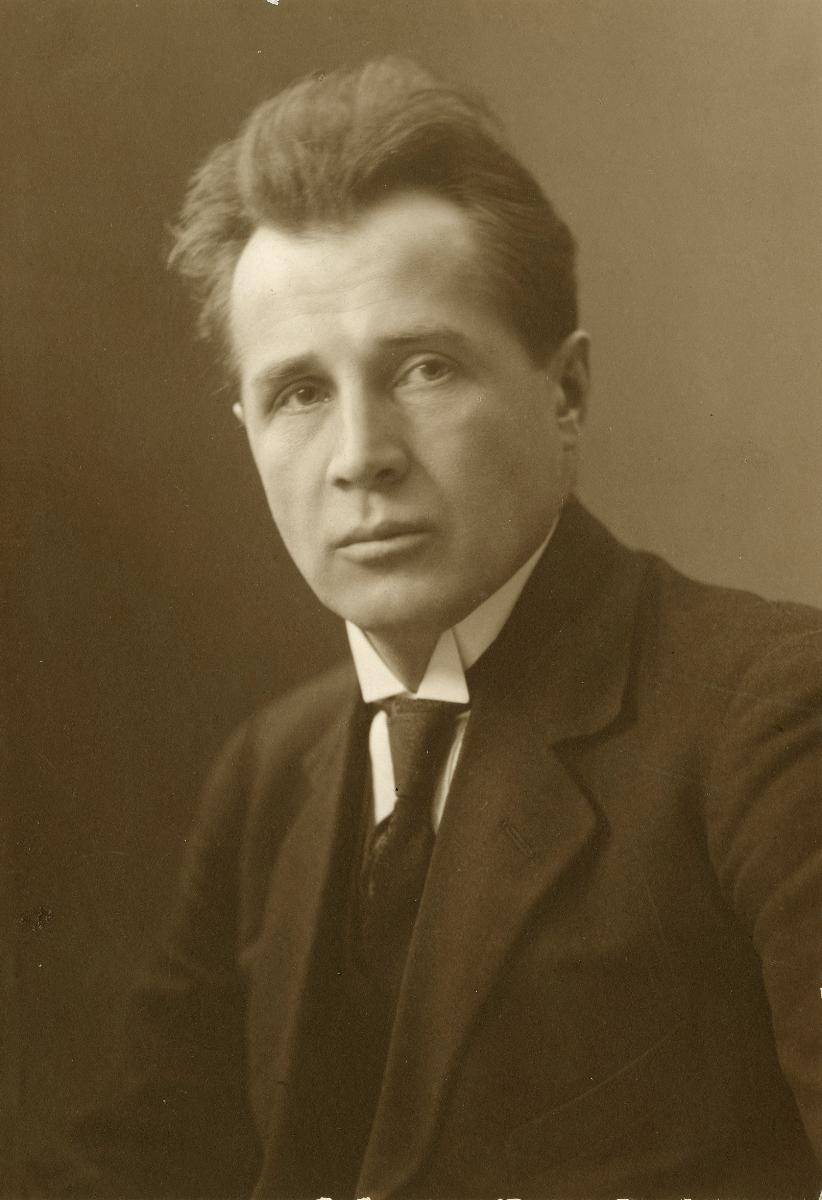
- The composer (c. 1925)
- Key: A major
- Opus: 55
- Composed: 1925–1926
- Duration: Approx. 31 minutes
- Movements: 4

Premiere
- Date: 8 April 1926
- Location: Helsinki, Finland
- Conductor: Leevi Madetoja
- Performers: Helsinki Philharmonic Orchestra

The Symphony No. 3 in A major, Op. 55, is a four-movement orchestral composition by the Finnish composer Leevi Madetoja, who wrote the piece from 1925–26 while vacationing in Paris, before returning to Helsinki, Finland to complete the work. Optimistic and pastorale in character, the symphony is today considered one of the finest symphonies in the post-Sibelian, Finnish orchestral canon; indeed, a "masterpiece ... equal in stature" to Sibelius's seven essays in the form. Although technically his penultimate symphonic composition (a fourth symphony was lost and thus never completed), the Third is nonetheless—due to its successor's fate—Madetoja's final addition to the repertoire.

The Helsinki Philharmonic Orchestra premiered the new symphony in Helsinki on 8 April 1926 under the composer's baton. Although Madetoja received the usual praise, the new piece admittedly perplexed its audience, which had expected a dramatic, patriotic statement similar to those its two monumental predecessors, the Second Symphony (1918) and The Ostrobothnians (1924), had made; the Third Symphony's (subsequent) significance thus eluded nearly everyone.

== History ==
After the success of The Ostrobothnians, Madetoja departed for France, staying for six months in Houilles, a small town just outside of Paris. Here, in the quiet of the Parisian suburbs, Madetoja began to compose his Third Symphony, Op. 55, and upon returning to Finland in October (due to financial worries), his work on the project continued.

The new symphony received its premiere in Helsinki on 8 April 1926, and although Madetoja received the usual praise, the audience and critics found the new work somewhat perplexing: with the monumental, elegiac Second Symphony having set expectations, the optimism and restraint of the Third came as a surprise, its (subsequent) significance eluding nearly everyone.

Some years later, the French music writer, Henri-Claude Fantapié, described the cheerful, pastorale Third Symphony as a "sinfonia Gallica" in spirit and explained the premiere as thus: "The listeners expected the opera [The Ostrobothnians] to be followed by a nationalistic anthem and were disappointed to hear something that seemed to them to be hermetic and that, to crown it all, was lacking in pomposity and solemnity … the properties the majority of Finnish music-lovers always expect in a new work." Nevertheless, today the Third Symphony is widely regarded as Madetoja's "masterpiece", the rare Finnish symphony equal in stature to Sibelius's seven essays in the form.

== Structure ==
The symphony is in four-movements:

1. Andantino – Allegretto
2. Adagio
3. Allegro non troppo
4. Pesante, tempo moderato – Allegretto

== Discography ==
Thus far, Madetoja's Third Symphony has been recorded only by Nordic orchestras, usually as a component piece of a larger recording project of Madetoja's major orchestral works, such as those by Petri Sakari and the Iceland Symphony Orchestra (1991–92), Arvo Volmer and the Oulu Symphony Orchestra (1998–2006), and John Storgårds and the Helsinki Philharmonic Orchestra (2012–13).

Conductor	Orchestra	Recorded	Duration	Label
Jorma Panula	Helsinki Philharmonic Orchestra	1973	30:43	Finlandia (FACD 011)
Petri Sakari	Iceland Symphony Orchestra	1991	32:11	Chandos (CHAN 9036)
Jukka-Pekka Saraste	Finnish Radio Symphony Orchestra	1993	29:24	Finlandia (FACD 4509-96867-2)
Arvo Volmer	Oulu Symphony Orchestra	1998	29:55	Alba Records (ABCD 162)
John Storgårds	Helsinki Philharmonic Orchestra	2013	31:24	Ondine (ODE 1211-2)
