= Ronald Barnes (carillonist) =

American carillonist (1927–1997)

- Born: Ronald Montague Barnes; June 11, 1927; Lincoln, Nebraska, US
- Died: November 3, 1997 (aged 70); San Francisco, California, US
- Education: University of Nebraska–Lincoln (BMus); Stanford University (MA)
- Occupations: Carillonist; musicologist
- Years active: 1946–1995

Ronald Montague Barnes (June 11, 1927 – November 3, 1997) was an American carillonist, composer, and musicologist. He first began playing the carillon as a teenager at his hometown's church. In 1952, at 24 years old, he was appointed to play the carillon at the University of Kansas, where he developed as a musician. He was later the carillonist for the Washington National Cathedral from 1963 to 1975 and the University of California, Berkeley, from 1982 until his retirement in 1995. He was an involved member of The Guild of Carillonneurs in North America, having served as its president, vice president, and several other roles.

Barnes produced 56 original compositions and hundreds of arrangements. He was a major force in establishing an American approach to writing music. He also influenced how people play the carillon. Much of his music is considered the standard repertoire for carillon students and professionals. He published editions of early carillon manuscripts and sought to develop standards for carillon performance, repertoire, and design and construction.

The Guild of Carillonneurs in North America maintains a memorial scholarship fund in his name to advance research of the carillon in North America.

== Biography ==
=== Early life, military career, and education ===
Ronald Montague Barnes was born on June 11, 1927, and raised in Lincoln, Nebraska. In 1931, at about the age of four, Barnes and his parents attended the dedication of the new carillon at First Plymouth Congregational Church in his hometown. As a teenager, Barnes took organ lessons at the church. When the current carillonneur was moving away, his teacher recommended he learn to play the carillon as well. The church's carillon was in a bad condition and about half of the bells were unable to be rung. He and his older brother cleaned the instrument and lubricated the moving parts to the best of their ability. Having no carillon music to use, Barnes began playing scales on the instrument. The local churchgoers were surprised that their church's carillon had twice as many bells as they originally thought. Barnes studied at the University of Nebraska and earned a Bachelor of Music degree in 1950.

During the occupation of Japan after World War II, Barnes served in the United States Navy as a specialist working with navigational instruments and as a helmsman of a destroyer. After his service as a sailor, he used the G.I. Bill to earn a Master of Arts in musicology from Stanford University in 1961. While studying there, he played the university's carillon in Hoover Tower. For his thesis, he studied the carillon preludes of Matthias Vanden Gheyn.

In 1948, Barnes attended the annual congress of The Guild of Carillonneurs in North America (GCNA) at the University of Michigan. There, he joined the organization, played an advancement recital to become recognized as a professional carillonneur, and met other professional players for the first time. Following the congress, Barnes traveled to Ottawa, Canada, to study the carillon at the Peace Tower with Robert Donnell for one summer; this was his only formal education on the carillon.

=== Career ===
In 1951, Barnes accepted an appointment at the University of Kansas to play its carillon, teach harpsichord, and care for the university's instrument collection. The administration expected brief daily concerts at noon and longer evening recitals twice per week. Barnes's music library was small and consisted of pieces of "questionable artistic significance", but fortunately the university was largely ignorant with respect to performance standards. Through this carillon, Barnes was first exposed to the sound of heavy, English-made bells, which influenced his ideas regarding the carillon's timbre. Barnes encouraged both Kansas faculty and students to compose for carillon. For example, John Pozdro, a teacher of music theory and composition, produced his first work for carillon in 1953 called Landscape. Roy Hamlin Johnson, a piano teacher, produced his first work, Summer Fanfares, in 1956. Gary White, a student and later graduate assistant, produced his first work, Toccata and Fugue, in 1962.

Barnes moved to Washington, D.C., in 1963 to become the first carillonneur for the Washington National Cathedral. Workplace politics made it difficult for him to focus on writing new music. In 1975, a financial emergency at the cathedral led to his full-time job being abolished the following year. He began a self-supporting career of drawing, publishing, and selling whimsical sketches featuring fictional carillons and organs interspersed with animals and people. These images were highly coveted by his peers.

In 1982, the University of California, Berkeley, contacted Barnes to solicit an opinion on who should be appointed to play their Class of 1928 Carillon and hired him when they discovered that he was available for the position. Barnes oversaw the carillon's enlargement and several repairs, and composed prolifically for the carillon. In 1982, he founded the Berkeley Carillon Institute, a music library and publishing house.

Within the GCNA, Barnes was the editor of music publications, the organization's archivist, and an adjudicator for its annual membership examinations. As editor of its scholarly journal, The Bulletin, he published nine issues between 1957 and 1961. He was vice president for four terms (1958–1962) and was president for three terms (1962–1965). He hosted the GCNA's annual congress three times: at the University of Kansas in 1956, at the Washington National Cathedral in 1964, and at the University of California, Berkeley, in 1988.

=== Later life and death ===
Barnes's failing eyesight forced him to stop performing and composing in 1994, and by 1995, he had retired from his position at Berkeley. In early 1997, Barnes had begun feeling very sick and in the late summer of 1997, he had been diagnosed with leukemia. Barnes died of the disease in San Francisco on November 3, 1997.

In 1998, the GCNA established a memorial scholarship fund in his name to support the future of the carillon art in North America. In 2007, after the fund had received enough donations and purchased enough investments, the first grant was awarded. It is now awarded annually. While, in the past, North Americans have taken advantage of scholarships to study the carillon in Europe, Barnes's memorial fund is the first grant program to exist in North America. According to the GCNA, Barnes was a gay man.

== Legacy ==
As president of the GCNA and editor of its journal The Bulletin, Barnes worked to set new standards for performance quality, selection of music, and sophistication in the design and construction of carillons. He was a proponent of the word carillonist rather than carillonneur to refer to players of the carillon. He argued that it is gender inclusive, easier to pronounce and spell, and in line with the naming conventions of other types of instrumentalists. He was responsible for introducing the carillon to several important composers, including Johan Franco, John Pozdro, Roy Hamlin Johnson, and Gary White. He also taught many prominent figures to play the carillon.

Barnes conducted scholarly research on several early carillon music manuscripts, including the re-pinning book of Théodore de Sany, the notebook of André Dupont, and the carillon preludes of Matthias Vanden Gheyn. Barnes edited and published new editions of their music.

Through his 56 compositions, Barnes established an American approach to writing music for the instrument. During his lifetime he received two awards: the Berkeley Medal for Distinguished Service to the Carillon (1982) and the GCNA Certificate of Extraordinary Service to the Carillon (1988). On June 24, 1995, Barnes was elected to the GCNA honor roll and granted lifetime membership.

== Musical style ==
Barnes's style of writing for the carillon was often of a mild, romantic character. He was especially influenced by the carillon at the University of Kansas, manufactured by John Taylor & Co. Barnes wrote music that took the strong overtones of bells into account and depended on this characteristic. His style focused on the carillon as a concert instrument. Many of his compositions feature an eminently singable melody.

== Musical compositions ==
Barnes composed 56 original works for the carillon, all of which are published either by American Carillon Music Editions or the GCNA. He composed more than three-quarters of his body of works during his tenure at the University of California, Berkeley. Barnes composed several variations and preludes on English-language folk songs and carols.

1. Sarabande (1952)
2. Prelude (1952)
3. Promenade (1964)
4. (Three Hymn Preludes)
  1. Picardie (1963)
  2. Land of Rest (1966)
  3. More Love (1970)
5. Fantasy: Western Wind (1966)
6. Serenade I (1978)
7. Nativity Triptych (1978)
8. Introit for Christmas Eve (1979)
9. Serenade II (1979)
10. Noël Suite I (1981)
11. Concerto for Two to Play (1981)
12. Introduction and Sicilienne (1981)
13. Noël Suite II (1982)
14. Signals (1982)
15. Prelude on Veni Creator (1982)
16. Six Classical Country Dances (1983)
17. Waltz (1983)
18. Variations on Wilson's Wilde (1984)
19. Three Dream Dances (1984)
20. A Somber Pavan (1984)
21. Corelliana Suite (1984)
22. Paraphrase on a Siciliana of Pasquale Ricci (1984)
23. A Suite of English Folksongs (1985)
  1. The Lark in the Morn
  2. The Keys of Canterbury
  3. O Sally My Dear
  4. What If a Day
  5. Hares on the Mountain
  6. Driving Away at the Smoothing Iron
24. Prelude, Intermezzo and Finale (1986)
25. 14 Carillon Preludes on Appalachian White Spirituals (1986–87)
  1. Rise and Shine, Brothers
  2. Land Beyond the Clouds
  3. It's the Good Old Work (Pennsylvania German: Siss des gudi aldi Warrick)
  4. Pardoning Love
  5. Jesus Christ the Apple Tree
  6. Come Think of Death and Judgement
  7. O Brethren, Take Courage (Pennsylvania German: Brieder, habt noch Mut)
  8. Daniel in the Lion's Den
  9. Tranquility
  10. Clear the Way, the World Is Waking
  11. Heavenly Welcome
  12. Harvest Field
  13. Happy in Eternity (Passacaglia)
  14. Our Meeting Is Over
26. Mrs. Nordan's Alborada (1987)
27. Dances for After Dark (1987)
28. Andante Cantabile (1987)
29. Homage to J. S. Bach: Hymn Prelude & Fugue on "Old 104th" (1988)
30. Song Prelude on "Past Three O'Clock" (1989)
31. Capriccio I (1989)
32. Musick for a While, Shall All Your Cares Beguile (1989)
33. Menuet Champêtre Refondu (1990)
34. Sonatine (1990)
35. Six Preludes on Australian Christmas Carols (1990)
  1. Noel Time
  2. Christmas Bush for His Adoring
  3. The Silver Stars Are in the Sky
  4. The Three Drovers
  5. The Christmas Tree
  6. Christmas Night (Cradle Song)
36. Canzone (1990)
37. Song (1991)
38. Capriccio II (1991)
39. Three Anglo-American Folksongs (Which Caution Against Some of the Perils of Falling in Love) (1991)
  1. One Morning in May
  2. Barb'ra Allen
  3. Billy Boy
40. Scottish Folk Song Preludes (1991)
  1. Go to Berwick, Johnny and Guidwife Count the Lawin
  2. A Rusebud by My Early Walk
  3. Leezie Lindsay
  4. We'll Meet a Beside the Dusky Glen
  5. Highland Laddie
  6. When I Think on This Warld's Pelf
  7. Ewie with the Crookit Horn
41. Concerto Grosso I (1991)
42. Paraphrase on "The Irish Carol" (1992)
43. Three Sketches (1992)
44. A Simple Suite (1992)
45. Capriccio III (1992)
46. Fantasy-Variations on "Dr. Bull's Juell" (1992)
47. Fantasy-Pastorale (1993)
48. Folksong Prelude on "Sweet Nightingale" (1993)
49. Fantasy-Variations on "Jenny Jones" (1993)
50. Prelude on "My Lord of Carnarvon's Jig" (1993)
51. Fandango (1993)
52. Concerto Grosso II (1994)
53. Eulogy for Ira Schroeder (1994)
54. Dialogues (1994)
55. Giulianiana: Variations on a Theme by Mauro Giuliani (1994)
56. A Little Suite (1994)

== See also ==
- John Courter – American organist and carillonneur (1941–2010)
- Émilien Allard – Canadian carillonneur (1915–1976)
