= Sigfús =

Sigfús is a masculine given name. Notable people with the name include:

- Sigfús Blöndal (1874–1950), Icelandic linguist and librarian
- Sigfús Daðason, Icelandic poet
- Sigfús Einarsson, Icelandic composer
- Sigfús Eymundsson, Icelandic photographer and bookseller
- Sigfús Sigurðsson (athlete) (1922–1999), Icelandic Olympic athlete

- Sigfús Sigurðsson (handballer) (born 1975), Icelandic handball player, grandson of the above
