= Symphony No. 4 (Martins) =

Symphony No. 4, titled Buddha Dharma or rarely Buddha Dhamma was a symphony made by Vasco Martins in 2001.The symphony was inspired by reading a book by Buddha. He composed it slowly (metronome figure circa 45), the one-piece work took two weeks and was made in and around the island of São Vicente.

The first performance was premiered on September 3, 2001 in São Paulo, Brazil by Lutero Rodrigues and the local cultural symphony (Sinfonia Cultura), its length is 19-20 minutes. It was performed in France in 2007 and was done by Henri-Claude Fantapié.

== Orchestra ==
- 1 piccolo, flutes, 2 oboes, 2 clarinets, 2 bassoon, contrabassoon (or tuba);
- 3 horns, 2 C-trumpets, 2 trombones, 1 tuba (of contrabassoon);
- 1 set of timpani, percussions of symbols from Tibet and Nepal, crotales, glockenspiel, a large drum and a large gong;
- violin, violas, celli, double basses

== Discography ==
- North Czech Symphony Orchestra of Teplice, as performed by Charles Olivieri-Munroe
