= The Ostrobothnians =

Opera in three acts by Leevi Madetoja

- Opera by Leevi Madetoja
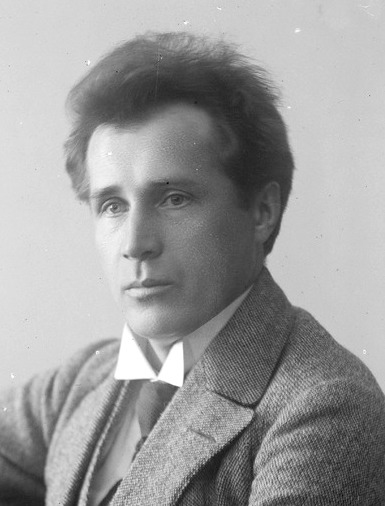
- The composer (c. 1920s)
- Native title: Pohjalaisia
- Librettist: Leevi Madetoja
- Language: Finnish
- Based on: Pohjalaisia by Artturi Järviluoma
- Premiere: 25 October 1924; Finnish National Opera, Helsinki

The Ostrobothnians (in Finnish: Pohjalaisia; occasionally translated to English as The Bothnians), Op. 45, is a verismo opera in three acts written from 1917 to 1924 by the Finnish composer Leevi Madetoja. The story, variously comedic and tragic, takes place around 1850 in the historical Finnish province of Ostrobothnia and features as its central conflict the deteriorating relationship between the farm community and its oppressive sheriff.

On 25 October 1924, the Helsinki Philharmonic Orchestra premiered the opera at the Finnish National Opera under the baton of Tauno Hannikainen. The enthusiasm of critics and the public quickly elevated the work to the (informal) status of the country's "national opera". Working in its favor was Madetoja's use of well-known folk melodies and the libretto's focus on freedom from oppression and self-determination, the allegorical qualities of which were particularly salient to a country that had won recently its independence from Russia. This inaugural production ran until November 1940, for a total of 90 performances, making it the greatest success of Madetoja's career. Today, the opera is recognized as Finland's first significant contribution to the operatic repertoire and has been revived numerous times.

The work is also well known in its abridged form, a five-movement suite for orchestra that Madetoja excerpted from Acts 1 and 2 of the (then-unfinished) stage production's score and which Robert Kajanus premiered to acclaim in Bergen, Norway on 8 March 1923. The most famous number is Song of the Prisoner (Vangin laulu), for which Madetoja set the popular Ostrobothnian folk song The Wind Bent the Birch (Tuuli se taivutti koivun larvan); in addition to being the prelude to Act 1 of the opera, the melody also serves as its key leitmotif.

== History ==
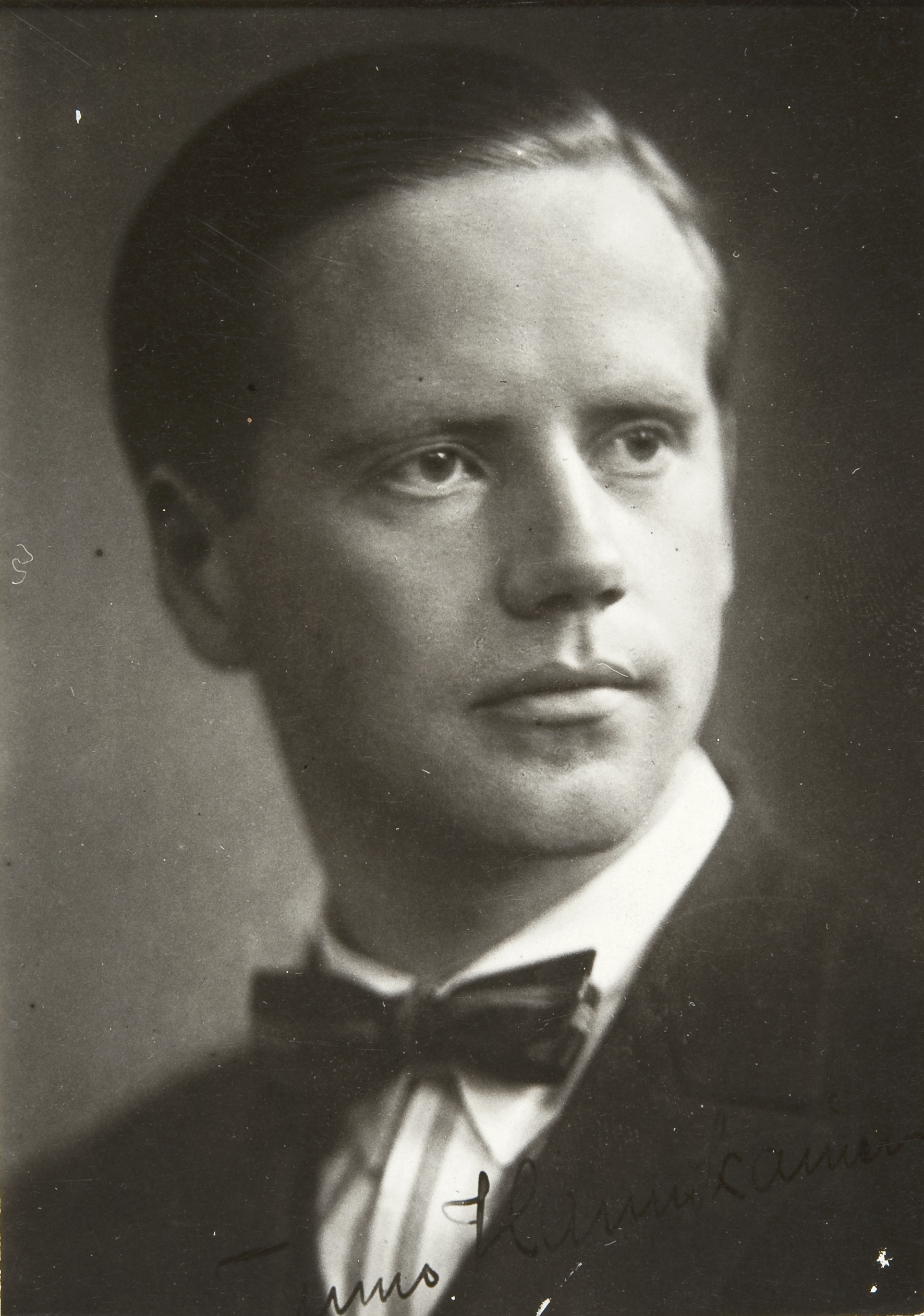
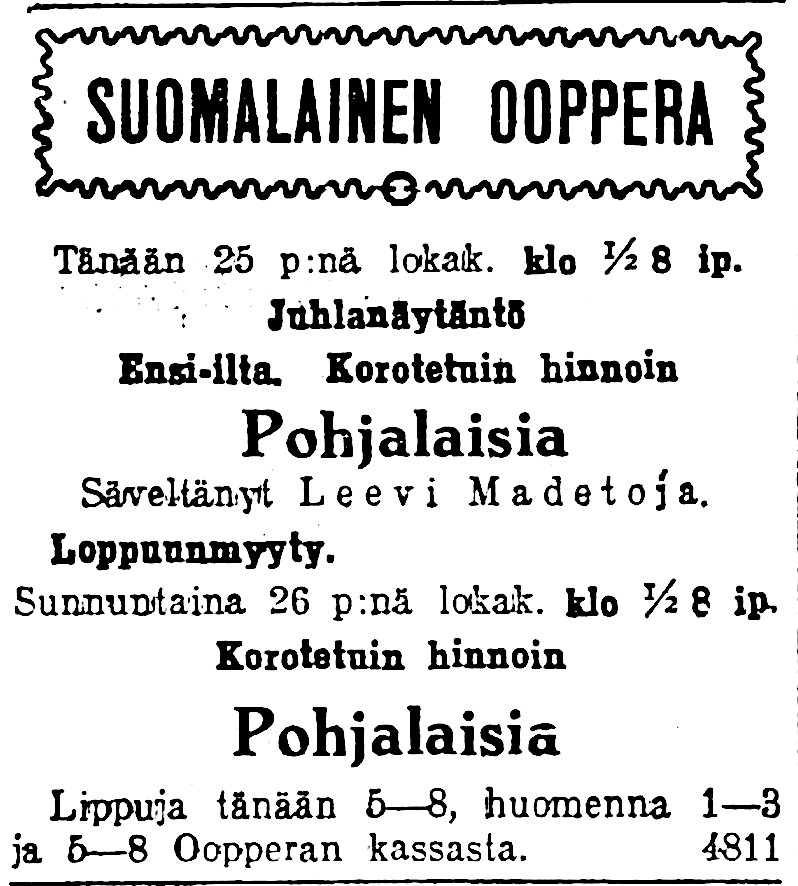
Madetoja's The Ostrobothnians premiered in on 25 October 1924 under the baton of Tauno Hannikainen.

The commission was first offered to Toivo Kuula in November 1917. Although Kuula viewed the play as a strong candidate for a libretto, its realism conflicted with his personal preference for fairy tale or legend-based subject matter, in keeping with the Wagnerian operatic tradition. When Kuula refused the opportunity, the commission fell to Madetoja, who had also expressed interest in the project. The composition process, begun in late December 1917, took Madetoja much longer than expected; letters to his mother indicate that he had entertained hopes of completing the opera by the end of 1920 and, when this deadline passed, 1921 and, eventually, 1922. In the end, the opera was not completed until September 1923, although it would be another full year until the opera premiered. Nevertheless, some of the music (from Acts 1 and 2) did see the light of day sooner, as Madetoja had pieced together a five-number orchestral suite at the behest of Kajanus, who premiered the suite on 8 March 1923 in Bergen, Norway during his orchestra tour; the reviews were positive, describing the music as "interesting and strange".

The first performance of the complete opera on 25 October 1924 at the Finnish National Opera (which, incidentally, was also the one-thousandth performance in the history of the Opera House). The director was Jalmari Lahdensuo and the set design was by Martti Tuukka, based drawings by Ilmari Mattson.

It was, perhaps, the greatest triumph of Madetoja's entire career. Indeed, with The Ostrobothnians, Madetoja succeeded where his teacher, Jean Sibelius, famously had failed: in the creation of a Finnish national opera, a watershed moment for a country lacking an operatic tradition of its own. (Note: The first notable Finnish opera was Fredrik Pacius's King Carl's Hunt (Kung Karls jakt) in 1852, after which followed a "long hiatus" until the rise of the national Romantic movement and "the desire to find an opera to reflect the burgeoning national values". Certainly, the country did not lack for attempts at forging a "national opera": for example, Oskar Merikanto in 1898 with Pohjan neiti (The Maiden of the North); Erkki Melartin in 1909 with the Wagnerian Aino; Selim Palmgren in 1910 with Daniel Hjort; Armas Launis in 1913 and 1917, respectively, with Seitsemän veljestä (Seven Brothers) and Kullervo; and, Aarre Merikanto in 1922 with Juha. Nevertheless, each failed to capture the public's (lasting) attention.) In Helsingin sanomat, Katila wrote on behalf of many Finns, calling The Ostrobothnians "the most substantial work in the whole of Finnish opera". The Ostrobothnians immediately became a fixture of the Finnish operatic repertoire (where it remains today), and was even produced abroad during Madetoja's lifetime, in Kiel, Germany in 1926; Stockholm in 1927; Gothenburg in 1930; and, Copenhagen in 1938.

The success of The Ostrobothnians was due to a confluence of factors: the appeal of the music, tonal but darkly colored; the use of folk melodies (blended with Madetoja's own idiom) familiar to the audience; a libretto (also by Madetoja) based upon a well-known and beloved play; a story about freedom from oppression and self-determination, the allegorical qualities of which were particularly salient in a country that had recently emerged from a war for independence; and, the skillful combination of comedic and tragic elements. The introduction to Act 1 (No. 2: Song of the Prisoner in the suite), for example, is based upon a famous Ostrobothnian folk song, The Wind Bent the Birch (Tuuli se taivutti koivun larvan), which was one of the 262 folk songs Kuula had collected during his travels and which made its way into Madetoja's nationalistic opera, becoming its signature leitmotif.

== Roles ==
The Ostrobothnians has a cast of thirteen roles, of which ten are for male and three are for female voice types; the opera also includes mixed choir. The principal characters are Jussi (baritone), his sister Maija (soprano), her fiancee Antti (tenor), and Jussi's love Liisa (mezzo-soprano).

Roles, character descriptions, voice types, premiere performers
Roles	Character description	Voice type	Premiere cast 25 October 1924
Maija Harri	The daughter of Erkki and the fiancée of Antti	soprano	Jennie Costiander
Kaisa	A dependent tenant on the Harri farm	contralto	Elbe Nissinen
Antti Hanka	A young freehold farmer who is now a prisoner	tenor	Alexis af Enehjelm
Erkki Harri	A freehold farmer in charge of the transport of prisoners	bass	Bruno Jorma
Jussi Harri	The son of Erkki and the young master of Harri farm	baritone	Toivo Louko
Salttu	A dependent tenant on the Harri farm	tenor	Paavo Costiander
Kaappo	A hired farmhand on the Harri farm	tenor	Emil Mantila
The Sheriff (Vallesmanni)	An imperious lawman	bass	Thorild Bröderman
Liisa	A servant girl in the Harri household who is in love with Jussi	mezzo-soprano	Lahja Linko
Köysti	The leader of a group of ruffians in Act 2	bass-baritone	Yrjö Somersalmi
The Scribe (Kriivari)	The Sheriff's assistant at the trial in Act 3	tenor	Eric Wilkman
The Lay Judge (Herastuomari)	The Sheriff's assistant at the trial in Act 3	baritone	Sulo Räikkönen
The Bailiff (Siltavouti)	The Sheriff's assistant at the trial in Act 3	bass	Sulo Halinen
Two herd girls		girls' voices	?
Three village boys		boys' voices	?
Chorus	Villagers, ruffians, and players	SATB	?

== Synopsis ==
The historical Finnish province of Ostrobothnia (in blue), from which Madetoja hailed and about which he wrote his most important work, The Ostrobothnians.

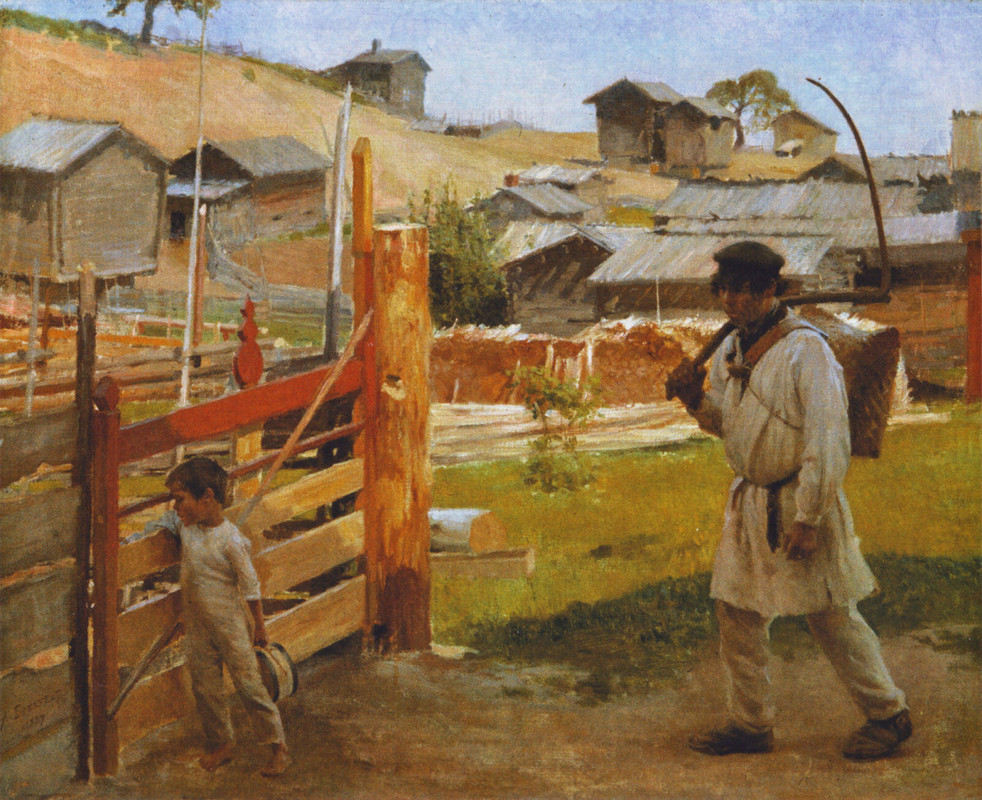
The Ostrobothnians is a verismo opera that details the hardships of Finnish peasants living under Russian dominance.

=== Act 1 ===
The main cabin on the Harri farm

Antti Hanka, a young freehold farmer, awaits trial for having stabbed a cobbler who insulted his fiancée, Maija Harri. Returning from the remand prison in Vaasa and transported to the Harri farm by Maija's father, Antti—shackled and dressed in prisoner's garb—sings the folk song Tuuli se taivutti koivun larvan (The Wind Bent the Birch). Maija, who is nervous to meet Antti and has gone into the woods, overhears her beloved's sorrowful song. Her brother Jussi, the young master of the Harri farm, retrieves her and arranges for the two lovers to meet alone. Maija struggles with her emotions: having recently converted to Pietism, she has renounced everything material but nonetheless still feels love for Antti and concern for his well-being. She begs him to repent his sins; he refuses, saying that it was incumbent upon him to defend her honor.

As an interlude, the focus shifts to two farmhands, Kaappo and Salttu, who have been drinking on the job and, thoroughly inebriated, are wallowing in self-pity. The arrival of the Sheriff interrupts the revelry. Although the Ostrobothnian farmers despise him for his brutal and oppressive tactics, they all nonetheless remove their hats out of deference to the law. The Sheriff demands to see Antti's travel paperwork, which Jussi comes forward to provide, but without removing his hat. Offended, the Sheriff strikes his whip, knocking Jussi's hat to the ground. Jussi, however, manages to grab the whip and defiantly breaks it in half. The sheriff departs, threatening reprisals for any future insolence.

=== Act 2 ===
The yard of the Harri farm

Liisa, a young servant girl at the Harri farm, pines for the brave Jussi; gradually she makes her feelings known to him. Jussi, with growing awareness of Liisa's beauty and innocence, begins to spend more time with her and soon their relationship deepens into love. Antti, who has been at court for sentencing, returns to the farm and announces that he has been convicted and ordered to prison. Maija, devastated, decides God's will cannot be for Antti to spend his life behind bars, and she persuades him to go on the lam. The village people have assembled on the Harri farm for dancing, but the arrival of a gang of ruffians interrupts the merrymaking. The men seek to plunder the farm, but withdraw when their leader, Köysti, loses in a wrestling match with Jussi. The victory is short-lived, when Jussi and the others discover that, during the fighting, Antti has disappeared. The act ends with the villagers searching for the escaped convict.

=== Act 3 ===
The main cabin on the Harri farm

Jussi and Liisa's love continues to blossom, and they begin to plan their wedding. Word of Antti's escape has reached the Sheriff, who returns to the Harri farm to interrogate the Ostrobothnians and sniff out the fugitive's confederates; accompanying the Sheriff is the Scribe, Lay Judge, and Bailiff. Kaappo is the first to be brought before the Sheriff; intimidated and confused, the farmhand provides false testimony that he last saw Antti drinking with Jussi. Kaisa, a motherly tenant of the Harri farm, provides far more resistance when she is questioned; her strategy of circumlocution enrages the Sheriff and he orders her out. After Kaisa departs, the Sheriff orders the Scribe to retrieve Jussi; he draws his whip from the side of his boot, itching for a fight.

The accused is brought before the Sheriff and after a brief sham trial, Jussi is handcuffed—his protestations of innocence notwithstanding—and taken into a backroom. The Lay Judge warns the Sheriff not to abuse his power and flout the law, but the Sheriff pushes past him and enters the room. Inside the Sheriff whips Jussi, seeking a confession. Their confrontation eventually spills into the main hall, where Jussi laments that he has been "beaten like a dog, like an old horse". He warns the Sheriff to stay away from him, but when he nonetheless advances, Jussi breaks his shackles and brandishes his knife. The Sheriff draws his revolver and fires two shots at Jussi, who nevertheless manages to stab the Sheriff to death. Although mortally wounded, Jussi's death is not immediate. Erkki, Maija (who confesses to being Antti's actual abettor), and Liisa each take a turn lamenting Jussi's fate. He drops to his knees and describes his vision: the oppressors are vanquished and the Ostrobothnians are slaves no longer. He asks Liisa to close his eyes, and her grief-stricken face is the last he ever sees.

== Recordings ==
Full opera

Conductor	Orchestra	Maija	Liisa	Antti	Jussi	Choir	Rec. (Note: Refers to the year in which the performers recorded the work; this may not be the same as the year in which the recording was first released to the general public.)	Time	Recording venue	Label	Ref.
Jorma Panula	Finnish National Opera Orchestra	Maija Lokka	Raita Karpo	Eero Erkkilä	Jorma Hynninen (1)	Finnish National Opera Chorus	1975	121:28	Kulttuuritalo	Finlandia	(Note: J. Panula–Finlandia (511002) 1992)
Jukka-Pekka Saraste	Finnish Radio Symphony Orchestra	Monica Groop	Ritva-Liisa Korhonen	Raimo Sirkiä	Jorma Hynninen (2)	Finnish Radio Chamber Choir, La Stelle di Domani	1997	127:22	Kulttuuritalo	Finlandia	(Note: J. Saraste–Finlandia (825646312757) 1998)

Derivative works

Some of the music (from Acts 1 and 2) did see the light of day before the premiere of the completed opera, as Madetoja had pieced together a five-number orchestral suite at the behest of Robert Kajanus, who premiered the suite on 8 March 1923 in Bergen, Norway during his orchestra tour; the reviews were positive, describing the music as "interesting and strange". The two most famous numbers of the suite are No. 1 Open Plain (arranged from Act 2 of the opera, "Hoi Mansikki") and No. 2 Song of the Prisoner (arranged from the prelude to Act 1 of the opera). The numbers of the complete suite are as follows:

1. Open Plain (Lakeus). Andantino – Pùi lento
2. Song of the Prisoner (Vangin laulu). Lento maestoso
3. Ruffians (Häjyt). Allegro moderato, rubato – Allegro vivace
4. Entrance Music (Tulopeli). Tempo di Marcia
5. Leaps and Jumps (Hypyt). Moderato mosso (Note: The individual movements to The Ostrobothnians Suite have also been translated to English as: No. 2 Prisoner's Song, No. 3 Thugs, No. 4 Arrival Reel, and No. 5 Dances.)

Conductor	Orchestra	Rec.	Time	Recording venue	Label	Ref.
Nils-Eric Fougstedt	Finnish Radio Symphony Orchestra (1)	?	?	?	Fennica	(Note: N. Fougstedt–Fennica (SS 12) 1965)
Petri Sakari	Iceland Symphony Orchestra	1991	16:45	Háskólabíó	Chandos	(Note: P. Sakari–Chandos (CHAN 6626) 2000)
Jukka-Pekka Saraste	Finnish Radio Symphony Orchestra (2)	1993	16:40	Kulttuuritalo	Finlandia	
Arvo Volmer	Oulu Symphony Orchestra	1998	16:15	Oulu Music Center	Alba	(Note: A. Volmer–Alba (ABCD 132) 2000)

== Notes, references, and sources ==
Notes

Sources

- Anon. (23 October 1924). "Pohjalaisia: 3-näytöksinen oopera, säveltäjä Leevi Madetoja" [The Ostrobothnians: 3-act opera, composer Leevi Madetoja]. Uusi Suomi (in Finnish). No. 246. p. 7.
- Korhonen, Kimmo (2007). Inventing Finnish Music: Contemporary Composers from Medieval to Modern. Finnish Music Information Center (FIMIC). ISBN 978-952-5076-61-5.
- Pulliainen, Riitta (2000a). Madetoja Orchestral Works 1: I Have Fought My Battle (booklet). Arvo Volmer & Oulu Symphony Orchestra. Tampere, Finland: Alba. p. 4–6. ABCD 132.
- Salmenhaara, Erkki (1992). Madetoja, L.: Symphony No. 3, The Ostrobothnians Suite, Okon Fuoko Suite (booklet). Petri Sakari & Iceland Symphony Orchestra. Colchester, England: Chandos. p. 4–7. CHAN 9036.
- Salmenhaara, Erkki (1987). Leevi Madetoja (in Finnish). Helsinki: Tammi. ISBN 951-30-6725-4.
