= Vasco Martins =

Cape Verdean musician (1956–2025)

- Born: 1956; Queluz, Portugal
- Origin: Cape Verde
- Died: 27 November 2025 (aged 68–69) Mindelo, Cape Verde
- Genres: Classical; New Age; Ambient
- Occupation: Musician
- Instruments: Guitar; piano; synthesizer
- Years active: 1976–2025
- Website: http://www.vascomartins.com

Vasco Martins (1956 – 27 November 2025) was a Cape Verdean musician and composer. He lived in Calhau, Cape Verde.

== Life and career ==
Martins was born in Queluz, Portugal in 1956.

Self-taught, he began his studies in 1974. He was a member of the band Colá in 1976 but then went to Portugal where he studied with Fernando Lopes Graça and later to France to pursue his musical education with Henri-Claude Fantapié. In 1979, he recorded his first LP. He returned to Cape Verde, and it was there that he created most of his work as a composer and instrumentalist, but also as musicologist and producer. He organized and founded the Baía das Gatas Music Festival along with his friends in 1984, the first music festival in the nation. He released more albums, including Quinto Mundo (1989), Eternal Cycle (1995), Memórias Atlânticas (Memories from the Atlantic) (1998) and Lunário Perpétio (2001). He released 4 Sinfonias in August 2007 which is related to his first four symphonies he made. His album Lua água clara (Clear Moon Water), a CD, was recorded in Paris in 2008. He later made Li Sin which was released in June 2010, one of his singles was first heard on Praia FM. Nearly two years later in January 2012, he released Azuris, titled after the Latin word for blue. His last album was Twelve Moons, released in Spring 2014.

Martins died on 27 November 2025, at the age of 69.

=== Other works ===
Vasco Martins was the first Cape Verdean to ever compose symphonies. His first one was related to the Spring Equinox. His second symphony was started in 1998 and completed in 2002 and titled Erupção (Eruption), after the last eruption at the time which was on Fogo, it was revised in 2004. His third one was titled Arquipélaco magnético, the Magnetic Archipelago, and his fourth one was titled Buda Dharma (Buddha Dharma) made in 2001. The fifth one was set in the Eastern parts and divided into six parts: the first four were the directions, the other two were in space and titled nadir and zenith. The sixth one was set in his family's island's tallest summit, Monte Verde, which was also Pandion halieatus. The seventh one was Alba, the eighth was titled A Procura da Luz (The Search for Light) and the ninth one was for orchestra and was performed with the Moravian Philharmonic Orchestra.

Martins also made works related to instrumentals, including 4 Notes on the City of Mindelo using a solo clarinet. He also performed chamber music, piano works including Piano Azul (Blue Piano) in 1998, guitar works including the Subtle Desert and electro music.

In 2008, he performed the opera play titled Crioulo (Creole). It premiered at Centro Cultural de Belém (CCB) in Lisbon on 27 March 2009, he was composer and performed the cantata "Lágrimas na Paraise".

He also wrote three poems, Universo da Ilha (Island Universe) in 1986, Navegam os olhares com o voo do pássaro, in 1989 and Run Shan in 2008.

=== Interviews ===
Martins was interviewed on 10 October 1997 with FM Stéreo and later with the major newspaper A Semana on 23 April 2005.

== Musical styles ==
In the Cape Verdean musical panorama, Vasco Martins may be considered unique. A composer who refused to be labeled, he may be considered a classical musician because of his incursions into symphonic orchestra music, but he may also be considered a new age musician because of his instrumental compositions, mostly using synthesizers, but in both cases, he was always inspired by traditional Cape Verdean music.

== Compositions ==
=== Symphonies ===
- Symphony No. 1: "Celebração do equinócio de Março" (Celebration of the Spring Equinox)
- 1998–2002 rev. 2004: Symphony No. 2:: "Erupção" ("Eruption"), for orchestra
- Symphony No. 3 "Arquipélago magnético" (Magnetic Archipelago), for orchestra
  1. Assim
  2. melodicamente em três partes
  3. Final generoso (expressão jubilosa)
- 2001: Symphony No. 4: "Buda Dharma", ("Buddha Dharma"), for orchestra
- Symphony No. 5: "Oriente" ("Eastern"), for orchestra
  1. norte (North)
  2. este (East)
  3. oeste (West)
  4. sul (South)
  5. nadir (Nadir)
  6. zenite (Zenith)
- Symphony No. 6: "Monte Verde" (Pandion halieatus), for orchestra
- Symphony No. 7: "Alba", for orchestra
- Symphony No. 8: "A procura da Luz" (The search for light), for orchestra
- Symphony No. 9, for orchestra

=== Instrumental music ===
- 4 Notas na cidade do Mindelo (4 Notes on the City of Mindelo), solo clarinet
- Anámnesis, guitar
- Concert, guitar
- Dôs temp p'um valsa, clarinet, in São Vicente Crioulo
- Musique pour adoucir le Coeur, in French
- Sub-Acqua pièce pédagogique pour basson et piano (Subaquatic or Underwater), bassoon and piano 1986

=== Other works ===
- 1989 Danças de Câncer, symphonic suite
  1. Abertura (Overture)
  2. Pulsações (Pulsations)
  3. Noites mágicas (Magic Nights)
  4. Terra vulcânica (Volcanic Land)
- A garça por cima das ondas
- Clara Luz, (Clear Light)
- Golfinhos no horizonte
- Oceano no coração (Ocean With a Heart)
- Calmas tardes no Monte Verde (Calm Winds in Monte Verde)
- Tardes caminhando (Afternoons on a Lane)

== Discography ==
=== Albums ===
- 1979: Vibrações (Vibrations)
- 1985: Para além da noite
- 1987: Oceano imenso (Immense Ocean)
- 1989: Quinto mundo
- 1995: Quiet moments
- 1995: Ritual periférico (Peripheral Ritual)
- 1995: Eternal cycle
- 1996: Island of the secret sounds
- 1997: Sublime delight
- 1997: Memórias atlânticas (Atlantic Memories)
- 1998: Danças de Câncer
- 2000: Apeiron
- 2001: Dôs
- 2001: Lunário perpétuo
- 2007: 4 sinfonias (4 Symphonies)
- 2009: Lua água clara (Clear Water Moon)
- 2010: Li Sin
- 2012: Azuris
- 2014: Twelve Moons (CD-r)

=== Chamber music ===
- Primeiras Meditações (First Meditations), with a flute, cello piano, violin and a guitar
- Azul Ibérico (Iberic Blue), string quartet
- Azul Caboverdiano (Cape Verdean Blue), string quartet

=== Piano works ===
- Piano Azul (Blue Piano) (1998)
- Amendoeira celeste
- Amornando
- Lua de Abril (April Moon)
- Lua de Dezembro (December Moon)
- Luz e sombra no deserto (Light and Sleep in the Desert)
- Memória da água (Memories of Water)
- Orion
- Peregrinações
- Ventos oceânicos (Ocean Winds)

=== Guitar works ===
- Deserto subtil (Subtle Desert)
- Estudo (Studies)
- Gesto flutuante
- Molto continuum
- Num varanda
- Prelúdio
- Sattva
- Situações triangulares (Triangular Situations)

=== Electronic music ===
- Apeiron
- Divinas of S. Nicolau
- Lunario Perpetuo (Lunar Perpetuary)
- Ocean-Light
- Ocean and Moon
- Sarva Mangalam
- Sublime Delight

== Musicals ==
=== Operas ===
Date	Title	Acts	Premiere	Libretto
2008	Crioulo		27 March 2009, Lisbon, Centro Cultural de Belém (CCB)	as componist, with cantata "Lágrimas na Paraise"

== Literary works ==
- Música Tradicional Cabo-verdiana (Cape Verdean Traditional Music)
  - Vol. I − A morna (Vol. I − Morna)

=== Poems ===
- Universo da Ilha (Island Universe), 1986
- Navegam os olhares com o voo do pássaro, 1989
- Run Shan, 2008
