= John Courter =

American organist and carillonneur (1941–2010)

- Born: John Edward Courter; June 25, 1941
- Died: June 21, 2010 (aged 68): Michigan State University (BS); University of Michigan (MM); North German Organ Academy; Netherlands Carillon School
- Occupations: Composer; organist; carillonneur

John Edward Courter (June 25, 1941 – June 21, 2010) was an American composer, organist, and carillonneur who served as a professor of music at Berea College in Berea, Kentucky, from 1971 until his death on June 21, 2010.

== Early life and education ==
A native of Lansing, Michigan, Courter earned a bachelor's degree in choral music education from Michigan State University in 1962 and a Master's of Music degree in organ in 1966 from the University of Michigan. He also studied at the North German Organ Academy and held diplomas from the Netherlands Carillon School.

== Career ==
Courter was active both as a performer and composer and was considered one of the leading contemporary composers for the carillon, having won several international prizes with his original carillon compositions. Courter also served on the World Carillon Federation Keyboard Committee, an international keyboard committee, which drafted a recommendation for the technical norms for a world standard carillon keyboard that was accepted by the World Carillon Federation in 2006.

Courter's carillon works have been published in Germany, the Netherlands and the United States as well as performed on carillons throughout the world, and he has composed more than 20 pieces for the carillon, including In Memoriam (2001) which is dedicated to those who died in the September 11 attacks. Both the associate carillonneur exam as well as the more advanced carillonneur exam administered by The Guild of Carillonneurs in North America have included Courter's compositions.

== Honors and awards ==
Courter's carillon performances and compositions have received numerous honors. In 1993, Courter was awarded the prestigious Berkeley Medal for Distinguished Service to the Carillon as a performer and composer. Courter has also been awarded the permanent title of honorary member by The Guild of Carillonneurs in North America.

== Legacy ==
In 2010, the largest carillon in the state of Kentucky, Berea College's 56-bell carillon, was renamed to honor John Courter. Courter's carillon compositions continue to be played after his death.

== See also ==
- Émilien Allard – Canadian carillonneur (1915–1976)
- Ronald Barnes – American carillonist (1927–1997)
- Wendell J. Westcott – American carillonneur (1911–2010)
