= Eugène Bigot =

French composer and conductor (1888–1965)

- Born: February 28, 1888; Rennes, France
- Died: July 17, 1965 (aged 77); Paris, France
- Occupations: Composer, conductor

Eugène Bigot (French: [øʒɛn biɡo]; 28 February 1888 – 17 July 1965) was a French composer and conductor.

== Life ==
Bigot was born in Rennes, Brittany. Initially trained as a violinist and later as a violist, he entered the Conservatoire de Paris in 1905 to continue his musical studies, which he had begun at the conservatory in his hometown. He studied harmony with Xavier Leroux, counterpoint with André Gedalge, and fugue and composition with Paul Vidal. At the same time, he was actively working as a substitute instrumentalist in various Parisian theatres, including Opéra and the Opéra-Comique, even during his military service. His notable pupils included Émilien Allard, Louis de Froment, Henri-Claude Fantapié, António Fortunato de Figueiredo, Karel Husa, Paul Kuentz, Jean-Bernard Pommier, Pierre Rolland, and Mikis Theodorakis.

He died in Paris.

Cultural offices
| Preceded by Albert Wolff | Principal Conductors, Lamoureux Orchestra; 1935–1950 | Succeeded by Jean Martinon |
| Preceded by none | Music Directors, Orchestre Philharmonique de Radio France; 1949–1965 | Succeeded by Charles Bruck |
