= Émilien Allard =

Canadian carillonneur (1915–1976)

- Born: 12 June 1915; Montreal, Quebec, Canada
- Died: 18 November 1976 (aged 61); Ottawa, Ontario, Canada
- Education: Université Laval; Conservatoire national de musique; Royal Carillon School "Jef Denyn"; Conservatoire de Paris
- Occupation: Carillonneur
- Years active: 1955–1976

Émilien Allard (12 June 1915 – 18 November 1976) was a Canadian carillonneur and composer. He composed more than 50 works for carillon and made more than 700 transcriptions of carillon music; many of which are still performed in Europe and North America. In 1958, he won the International Carillonneurs' Prize at the Brussels World's Fair. For RCA Victor he released the LP album Carols at the Carillon of Saint Joseph's Oratory for which he wrote the arrangements. His Marche du maréchal and his Marche H.I.C. were recorded by Howard Cable and his Notule No. 1 and Profil canadien no 2. were included on Gordon Slater's LP Bells and Brass. Many of his original manuscripts and papers are a part of the collection at the Bibliothèque et Archives nationales du Québec.

== Life and career ==
Born in Montreal, Quebec, Allard's initial musical training was with Antonio Thompson and Father Joseph-Gers Turcotte at the Trois-Rivières seminary where he studied piano and music theory. He was a clarinetist in the city concert band of Grand-Mère, Quebec during his youth and later served as that ensemble's conductor. He also worked as an organist at a few churches in that town. He earned a lauréat diploma from the Université Laval and then entered the Conservatoire national de musique in Montreal where he earned a licentiate diploma. At the conservatoire, he was a pupil of Eugène Lapierre in organ and harmony.

After graduating from the conservatoire, Allard was a clarinetist in the Central Band of the Royal Canadian Air Force in Rockcliffe, Ontario from 1942 to 1945. He then entered the Royal Carillon School "Jef Denyn" in Mechelen, Belgium in 1946 where he earned a carillonneur diploma in 1948. At the school, he studied composition with Jef van Hoof and bell ringing with Staf Nees. He pursued further studies at the Conservatoire de Paris in 1948-1949 where his teachers included Eugène Bigot (conducting), Maurice Duruflé (orchestration), and Olivier Messiaen (aesthetics).

In 1949, Allard returned to Canada where he initially struggled to find a suitable appointment in his chosen career as a carillonneur. He finally attained a position as the carillonneur at Saint Joseph's Oratory in Montreal in 1955, a post he remained in for two decades. He gave annual concert tours throughout North America between 1959 and 1976. In 1975, he left Saint Joseph's to become the Dominion Carillonneur of Canada at the Peace Tower in Ottawa. He remained there until his death one year later at the age of 61.

== See also ==
- Ronald Barnes – American carillonist (1927–1997)
- John Courter – American organist and carillonneur (1941–2010)
