= Erkki Salmenhaara =

Finnish composer

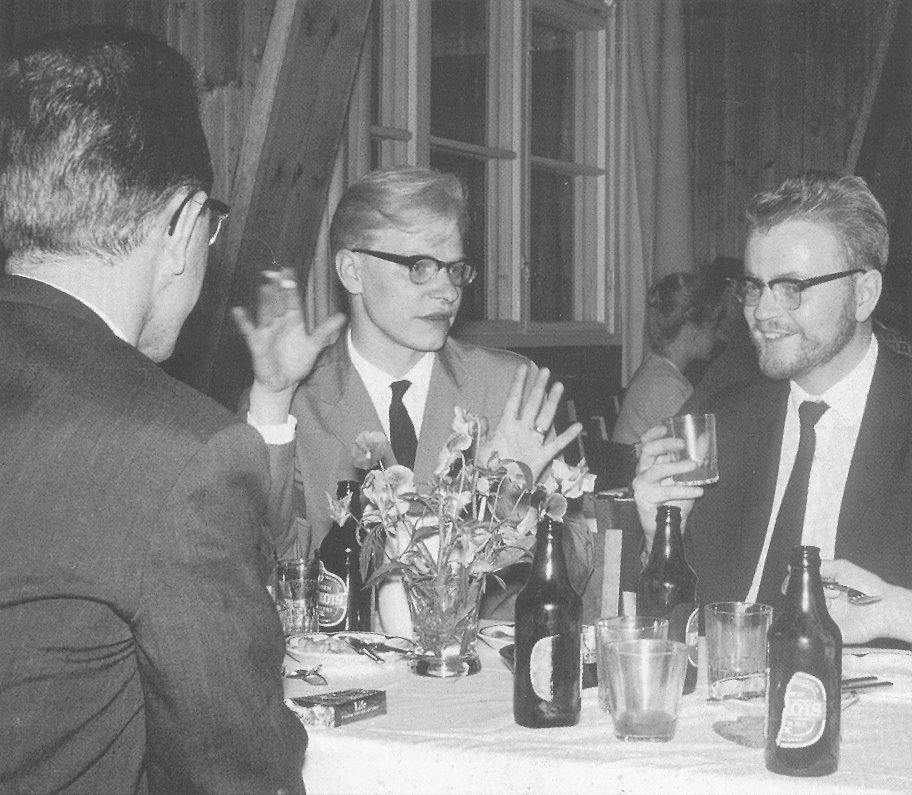
- Salmenhaara (center) talking with Swedish composer Jan Bark (right), circa 1963
- Born: March 12, 1941; Helsinki, Finland
- Died: March 19, 2002 (aged 61); Helsinki, Finland
- Spouse: Anja Kosonen (m. 1961; div. 1978)
- Children: 2

Signature
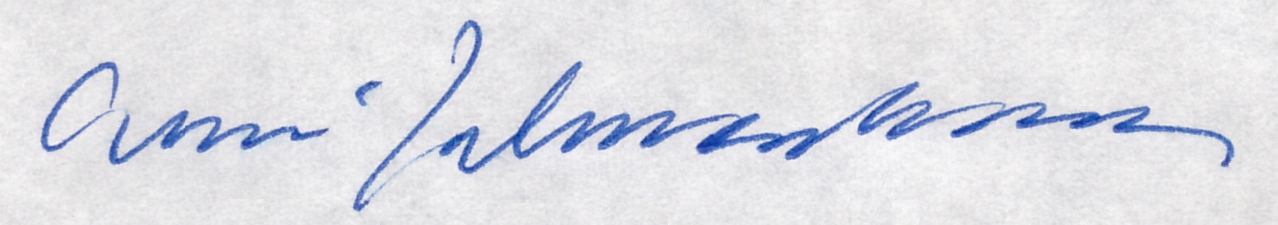

Erkki Olavi Salmenhaara (March 12, 1941 – March 19, 2002) was a Finnish composer and musicologist.

== Personal life ==
Salmenhaara was born in Helsinki, Finland, and married Anja Kosonen in 1961. They had two sons, but divorced in 1978. Salmenhaara died in Helsinki on March 19, 2002.

== Career ==
Salmenhaara studied composition with Joonas Kokkonen at the Sibelius Academy until 1963, and then continued his studies with György Ligeti in Vienna. Salmenhaara then studied musicology, aesthetics and theoretical philosophy at the University of Helsinki, and earned his PhD in 1970 with a doctoral thesis about the works of the composer Ligeti. He served as lecturer (1966–1975) and associate professor (1975–2002) of musicology at the University of Helsinki and was also the leading writer on classical music in Finland. In addition, he served as chairman of the Society of Finnish Composers (1974–1976) and of the Association of Finnish Symphony Orchestras (1974–1978).

== Works ==
Prior to studying with Kokkonen, Salmenhaara had already written several tonal pieces, including the 17 Small Pieces for Piano (1957–1960). In the early 1960s, he was associated with the modernist Finnish Musical Youth.

Beginning in the 1970s, Salmenhaara's works began to be characterized by frequent repetition of triadic motives with gradual changes in harmony. Although this led to his being linked to the movement in music known as minimalism, Salmenhaara nonetheless denied this connection. Like the works of the Dutch minimalist composer Simeon ten Holt, Salmenhaara's works from this period utilize a musical language closely related to that of the Romantic period of classical music, giving his music a decidedly European aesthetic. Salmenhaara's compositions include several symphonic works, chamber music pieces, choral works, songs for solo instrument, and vocal arts songs. He also wrote one opera, Portugalin nainen (The Portuguese Woman) which premiered at the Suomen Kansallisooppera in February 1976.

Salmenhaara's published writings include a textbook on music theory, a history of 20th-century music, monographs on Ligeti, Jean Sibelius's Tapiola and the Brahms symphonies, biographies of Jean Sibelius and Leevi Madetoja, and a history of the Society of Finnish Composers. He also contributed to Erik W. Tawaststjerna's comprehensive biography of Sibelius. His most significant literary work was his contribution to a four-volume history of Finnish music (published in 1995–1996), writing about the period from the Romantic era to the Second World War. In addition, from 1963 to 1973, he served as a critic for the leading Finnish newspaper Helsingin Sanomat.

== Discography ==
(selection)

- Suomi-Finland, La Fille en mini-jupe, Adagietto, Le bateau ivre. Tampere Philharmonic Orchestra, Eri Klas. Ondine ODE 1031–2.
- Chamber works with piano. Jouni Somero, piano – Raymond Cox, violin – Laura Bucht, cello. FC Records FCRCD-9727.
- Complete solo piano music. Jouni Somero, piano. (2CD) FC Records FCRCD-9707
- Symphonies nos. 2, 3 & 4. Finnish Radio Symphony Orchestra, Paavo Berglund, Petri Komulainen, Ulf Söderblom. Finlandia Classics FINCLA 27.
- Symphony no. 5 "Lintukoto". Finnish Radio Symphony Orchestra, Akateeminen laulu, Riikka Hakola (soprano), Jorma Hynninen (baritone), Jorma Panula. UHCD350.

== Selected writings ==
- Sointuanalyysi, 1968.
- Das musikalische Material und seine Behandlung in den Werken Apparitions, Atmosphères, Aventures und Requiem von György Ligeti (Dissertation), 1970.
- Tapiola: Sinfoninen runo Tapiola Sibeliuksen myöhäistyylin edustajana, 1970.
- Soinnutus: Harmoninen ajattelu tonaalisessa musiikissa, 1970.
- Tutkielmia Brahmsin sinfonioista, 1979.
- Jean Sibelius, 1984.
- Leevi Madetoja, 1987.
- Löytöretkiä musiikkiin: Valittuja kirjoituksia 1960–1990, 1991.
- Suomen musiikin historia 1–3, 1995–1996.

== Literature ==
- Henri-Claude Fantapié: Illuminations, il est grand temps in Muualla, täällä: Kirjoituksia elämästä, kulttuurista, musiikista, pp. 110–118. Ateena Kustannus, Jyväskylä. 2001. ISBN 951-796-265-7
- Henri-Claude Fantapié: Quelques réflexions personnelles, suppositions et supputations, à propos du naïf dans l'art ou pour servir à une interprétation de l'œuvre d'Erkki Salmenhaara. Boréales n°9/10. 1978. pp. 244–258
- Henri-Claude Fantapié: Le sacré, le rituel et le profane dans deux œuvres d'Erkki Salmenhaara Études finno-ougriennes, Tome 41, 2009. ADÉFO L'Harmattan.
- Guy Rickards: Erkki Salmenhaara: Finnish music from the avant-garde to the euphonious. The Guardian, Thursday 23 May 2002.
