= Pohjalaisia (play) =

Finnish play

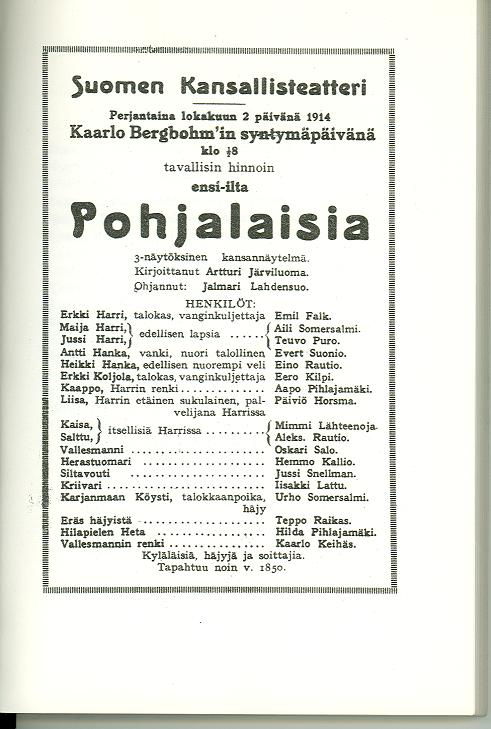
The playbill for the first performance of the play

Pohjalaisia (The Ostrobothnians) is a 1914 Finnish play written by Artturi Järviluoma, and was used as the story for the 1924 opera by Leevi Madetoja. It was later adapted into films in 1925 and 1936.

Its story takes place around 1850 in South Ostrobothnia, depicting local folklife and rebellion of the peasants against the Swedish-speaking arbitrary lensmann. While the lensmann character can be seen as being based on not only oppressive officers but also Klaus Fleming, a Swedish nobleman who was rebelled against by South Ostrobothnian pesants in the late 16th century, the character is also seen as a metaphor for 'the years of oppression' that Finns were facing under Russian rule when the play was written.

== 1914 play ==
The play was published by Artturi Järviluoma and produced in 1914. It was first performed at the Finnish National Theatre and directed by Jalmari Lahdensuo, who was also the overall theatre director.

However there exists concrete doubt over whether Järviluoma actually fully wrote the play. Järviluoma's other literary works are modest in comparison. Anton Kangas (1867–1904) worked as Järviluoma's teacher and wrote the unfinished play Härmäläisiä. Although the original script has been destroyed, Järviluoma's notes on it have survived and Pohjalaisia may have largely been derived from it.

== 1924 opera ==
Leevi Madetoja made a popular opera in 1924 based on the play with the same name, commonly known by its English name as The Ostrobothnians.

== 1925 filmatization ==
The 1925 film version also titled Pohjalaisia is a silent film. It was also directed by Jalmari Lahdensuo. It was aided by the popularity of the opera from only the year before. The film was restored in 2012.

== 1936 filmatization ==
The 1936 film version again titled Pohjalaisia came with sound and was directed by Toivo Särkkä.
