= John Pozdro =

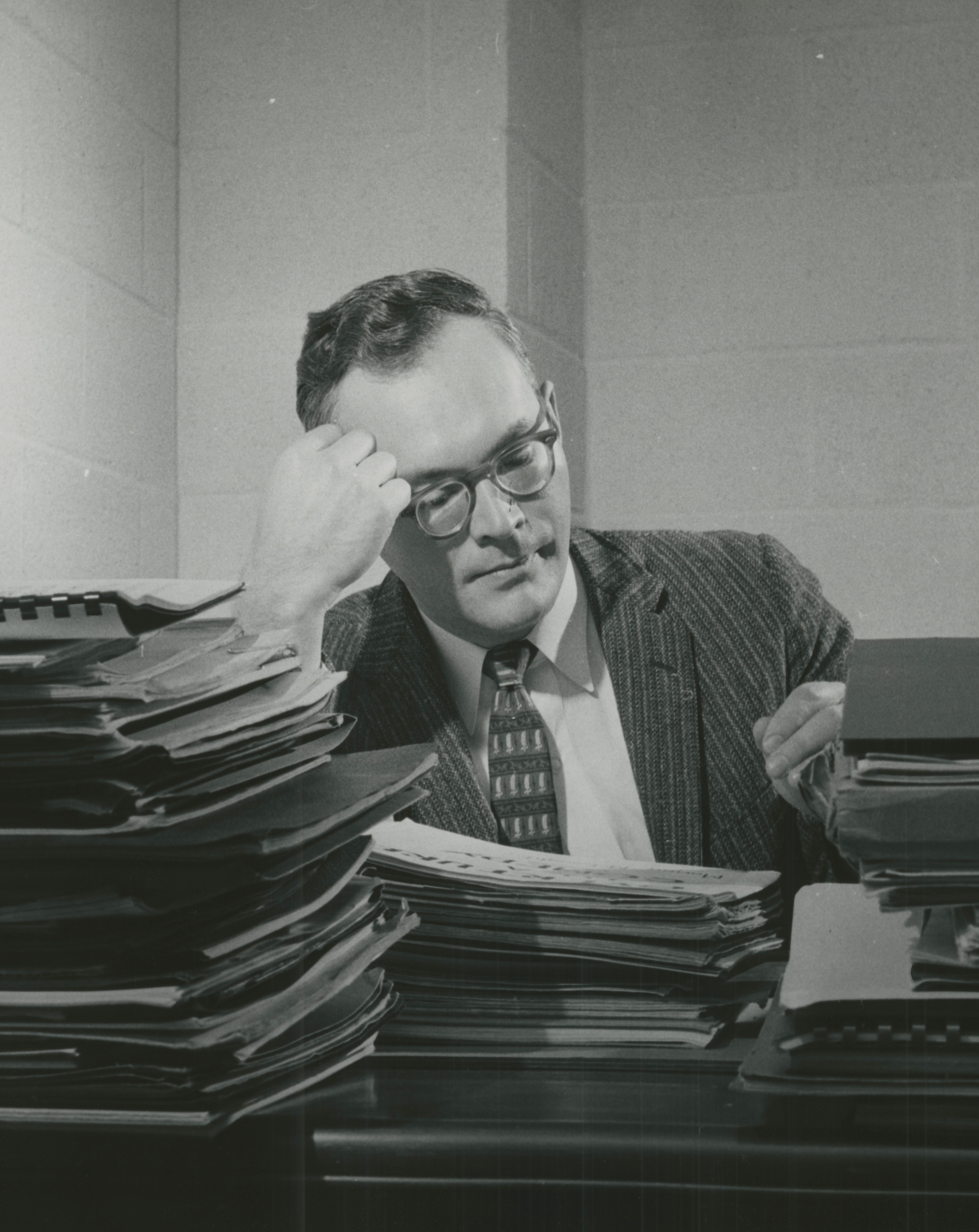
- Photo from 1960's
- Born: John Walter Pozdro; August 14, 1923; Chicago, Illinois, U.S.
- Died: January 1, 2009 (aged 85); Lawrence, Kansas, U.S.

John Walter Pozdro (August 14, 1923 – January 1, 2009) was an American composer and pedagogue. Baker's Biographical Dictionary of Musicians describes his music as “inherently pragmatic, with tertian torsion resulting in the formation of tastefully enriched triadic harmony, and with asymmetric rhythms enhancing the throbbing pulse of musical continuity.”

== Biography ==
Pozdro was born in Chicago, Illinois on August 14, 1923 of Polish and German descent. He began taking piano and music theory lessons at an early age with Nina Shafran. He then studied piano and music theory with Edward Joseph Collins at the American Conservatory of Music. After service in the Military Intelligence Division of the U.S. Army, he entered Northwestern University. There, he studied with Robert Mills Delaney and received his Bachelor of Music in 1948 and Master of Music in 1949. He later studied at the Eastman School of Music with Howard Hanson, Bernard Rogers, and Wayne Barlow earning his Ph.D. in Composition in 1958.

Pozdro had his first teaching position at the University of Northern Iowa in Cedar Falls from 1949 to 1950. He was also a visiting professor at Northwestern University and a teaching fellow at the Eastman School of Music. From 1950 to December 1992, he was a faculty member of the University of Kansas. He served as their Department Chairman of Theory and Composition from 1961 to 1988. He also served as the chairman of the annual Symposium of Contemporary American Music from 1958 to 1967.

He was commissioned by the Ford Foundation, the Oklahoma City Symphony, the Music Teachers National Association, Concerts for Young Audiences, the Washington Performing Arts Society, the Stanton Memorial Foundation, and The Guild of Carillonneurs in North America. He has had articles published in American Music Teacher, The Composer, and College Music Symposium, among others. His article in American Music Teacher on the nature of nonfunctional tertian harmonic progression was the first such on the subject.

== Awards and honors ==
Pozdro received the Bernard Fink Award for Outstanding Classroom Teaching in 1961, and he was selected as one of Kansas University’s outstanding teachers in 1970. He was the recipient of a grant from the National Endowment of the Arts in 1976, a citation from the American Council of Polish Cultural Arts in 1978, and awards from the American Society of Composers, Authors and Publishers for achievement in the field of serious music annually from 1965 until 2003. His Third Symphony was nominated for the Pulitzer Prize for Music. In 1993 he served as the guest composer at the University of California at Berkeley where he was presented with the University of California-Berkeley Medal. He was a National Patron of Delta Omicron, an international professional music fraternity.

== Works ==
- Elegy, trumpet and piano
- Hello Kansas, musical
- Impression for Handbells
- Impressions for Woodwinds and Piano
- Interlude, flute, B-flat clarinet, French Horn, and bassoon
- Malooley and the Fear Monster, opera
- Piece for Cello and Piano
- Quintet for Piano and Woodwinds
- Rip City, marching band, arr. James Barnes
- Sextet (Rhapsody for Flute and Strings)
- Sonata for Brass Choir and Percussion
- Sonatine for Violin and Piano
- Transmogrifications, percussion, arr. Steve Riley
- Two Pieces for Cello and Piano

=== Choral works ===
- All Pleasant Things
- All Pleasant Things (Solo)
- Alleluia
- How Many and Varied are Your Works
- Spirit of Mount Oread
- The Carol of the Shepherds
- The Creation (All Things Bright and Beautiful)
- The King of Glory
- The Light
- The Night
- The Rain
- They That Go Down To The Sea In Ships

=== Works for carillon ===
- Landscape for Carillon
- Landscape II: Ostinato for Carillon
- Rustic Landscape
- The Winds of Autumn
- Triptych for Carillon
- Variations on a Slavonic Theme

=== Works for orchestra ===
- Cynical Overture
- Lament of Judas
- March (Unfinished assignment)
- Miniature Suite
- Rondo Gioioso
- Waterlow Park

==== Symphonies ====
- Symphonic Piece
- First Symphony (In One Movement)
- Second Symphony
- Third Symphony

=== Works for piano ===
- A Little March
- Ballade-fantasy
- For Nancy
- March
- Piano Sonata No. 1 (Sonata for Piano)
- Piano Sonata No. 2
- Piano Sonata No. 3
- Piano Sonata No. 4
- Piano Sonata No. 5
- Piano Sonata No. 6
- Prelude
- Preludes I-IV
- Preludes V-VII
- Rondo
- Three Short Pieces (Prelude, Waltz, March)
- Waltz Sentimento
