= Toivo Kuula =

Finnish composer (1883–1918)

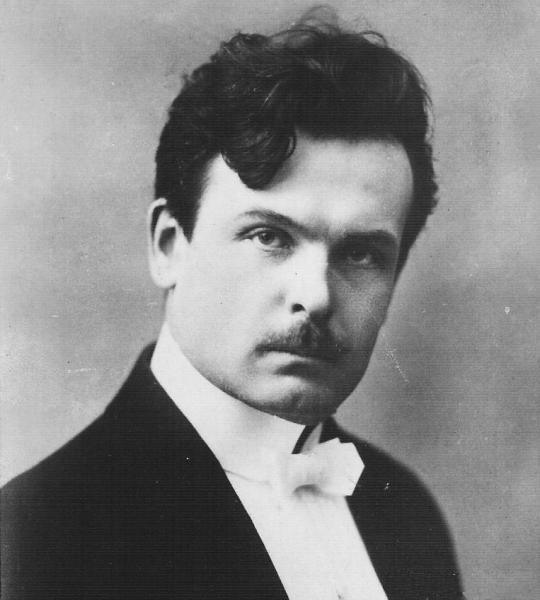
- Kuula (c. 1910s)
- Born: 7 July 1883; Alavus, Finland
- Died: 18 May 1918 (aged 34); Viipuri, Russia
- Spouse: Alma Silventoinen (m. 1914)

Toivo Timoteus Kuula (7 July 1883 – 18 May 1918) was a Finnish composer and conductor of the late-Romantic and early-modern periods, who emerged in the wake of Jean Sibelius, under whom he studied privately from 1906 to 1908. The core of Kuula's oeuvre are his many works for voice and orchestra, in particular the Stabat mater (1914–18; completed by Madetoja), The Sea-Bathing Maidens (1910), Son of a Slave (1910), and The Maiden and the Boyar's Son (1912). In addition he also composed two Ostrobothnian Suites for orchestra and left an unfinished symphony at the time of his murder in 1918 in a drunken quarrel.

== Life and career ==
He was born in the Vehkakoski village of the Alavus town and registered as a native in the city of Vaasa (then Nikolainkaupunki), when Finland still was a Grand Duchy under Russian rule. He is known for his depictions of Finnish nature and people.

Kuula became Jean Sibelius's first composition student. He is best remembered for his large output of melodic choir and vocal works. His instrumental works include two Ostrobothnian Suites for orchestra, a violin sonata, a piano trio, and an unfinished Symphony. Kuula's major choral work is often considered the cantata Stabat Mater, which was completed in spring 1915 (original version, later lost) but revised, beginning 1917 and unfinished at the time of his death. He also wrote a few dozen highly artistic piano works, and 24 songs, many of them first performed by his wife, the singer Alma Kuula.

Kuula has been considered an even more talented composer than his teacher Sibelius.

A Swedish critic once said that Kuula's music reaches parts of the human spirit where one is forced to deep examination of one's self.

Kuula was known to be a fierce Fennoman. He died in the provincial hospital in Viipuri in 1918 after being mortally wounded 18 days earlier on Walpurgis Night by a bullet fired by a Jäger. The bullet was fired as a result of a quarrel that happened at the Hotel Seurahuone in conjunction with the first victory celebration of the White victory in the Civil War of Finland. Ironically, "Kuula" means "bullet" in Finnish. Kuula is buried in Hietaniemi cemetery, Helsinki.

Toivo Kuula married Alma Silventoinen in 1914; the couple had one daughter, Sinikka, who later became a professional pianist.

== Compositions ==
A simplified works list (by Joel Valkila) on the basis of Tero Tommila's Catalogue of Works:

- Op. 1 Violin Sonata
- Op. 2 Five Songs for Voice and Piano (also arranged as chamber works)
- Op. 3a Five Pieces for Violin and Piano: I. Cradle Song, II. Nocturne, III. Folk Song (I), IV. Folk Song (II), V. Scherzino
- Op. 3b Three Piano Works: I. Elegy, II. Wedding March, III. Little Gavotte
- Op. 3c Incidental Music to "Isä ja Tytär"
- Op. 4 Seven Songs for Male Choir
- Op. 5 Festive March for Chorus and Orchestra (or Brass)
- Op. 6 Two Songs for Voice and Piano
- Op. 7 Piano Trio
- Op. 8 Two Songs for Voice and Piano
- Op. 9 Ostrobothnian Suite No.1 for Orchestra: I. Pastorale, II. Folk Song, III. Ostrobothnian Dance, IV. Devil's Dance, V. Song of the Dusk (II. & III. also as arranged for Violin and Piano)
- Op. 10 Prelude and Fugue for Orchestra
- Op.11 Seven Songs for Chorus
- Op.12 'Merenkylpijäneidot' ("Sea-Bathing Maids") for Voice and Orchestra/Piano
- Op.13 Festive March for Orchestra/Piano
- Op.14 'Orjan poika' ("Son of a Slave") – Symphonic Legend for Soprano, Baritone, Chorus and Orchestra (also 3-movement Suite for Orchestra)
- Op.15 Cantata 'Kuolemattomuuden toivo' ("Hope for Immortality")
- Op.16a Two Songs for Voice and Piano
- Op.16b Two Pieces for Organ: I. Prelude, II. Intermezzo
- Op.17a South Ostrobothnian Dance Suites I & II for Violin and Piano
- Op.17b Twelve South Ostrobothnian Folk Dances for Voice/Violin and Piano
- Op.17c Two Pieces for Violin and Piano: I. Scherzo, II. Melodia lugubre
- Op.18 'Impi ja pajarin poika' ("The Maiden and the Son of a Blacksmith") for Voice and Orchestra/Piano
- Op.19 Three Fairy-Tale Pictures for Piano
- Op.20 Ostrobothnian Suite No.2 for Orchestra: I. Tulopeli, II. Rain in the Forest, III. Menuet, IV. Dance of the Orphans, V. The Devils Making Magic Flames
- Op.21 Three Songs for Chorus
- Op.22/1-2 Two Pieces for Cello and Orchestra: I. Chanson sans paroles, II. Elegy (Suru)
- Op.22/1-2 Two Pieces for Violin/Cello and Piano: I. Chanson sans paroles, II. Elegy (Suru)
- Op.22/3 Song for Voice and Piano
- Op.23 Four Songs for Voice and Piano
- Op.24 Four Songs for Voice and Piano
- Op.25 Stabat Mater for Chorus and Orchestra (Note: Not left unfinished as has been stated)
- Op.26 Six Piano Pieces: I. Round Dance, II. Pastorale Atmosphere, III. Dance Improvisation, IV. Nocturne, V. Rauha (Adagio), VI. Funeral March
- Op.27a Eight Songs for Male Choir
- Op.27b Nine Songs for Male Choir
- Op.28/1-2 Two Pieces for Brass Orchestra: I. At the Mountain, II. A Tune
- Op.28/4 March of the Cudgelmen for Choir and Orchestra (or a capella)
- Op.29a Three Songs for Voice and Piano
- Op.29b Four Songs for Choir
- Op.29c Two Songs for Male Choir
- Op.30a Incidental Music to 'Kandaules'
- Op.30b Incidental Music to 'Medicit'
- Op.30c Incidental Music to 'Taikapeili' ("The Magic Mirror")
- Op.31a Two Songs for Voice and Orchestra/Piano
- Op.31b Four Songs for Choir
- Op.32 Incidental Music to 'Meripoikia' ("The Sea Boys")
- Op.33 March of the Carburetors for Piano [unfinished]
- Op.34a Seven Songs for Male Choir
- Op.34b Three Songs for Chorus
- Op.35 Three Songs Arrangements for Voice and Orchestra
- Op.36 Symphony [unfinished]: Introduction
- Op.37 Two Song Transcriptions for Piano
- Six Posthumous Piano Pieces (Two unfinished)
- Six Posthumous Orchestral Pieces (Two unfinished)
- Twenty-Two Posthumous Chamber Pieces (Five unfinished)
- Fourteen Songs (Three unfinished)
- One Posthumous Cantata

== Selected recordings ==
- Complete Works for Solo Piano. Adam Johnson. Grand Piano GP780 (2018)
- Finnish Songs. Kirsi Tiihonen, Satu Salminen. Marco Polo 8.225177 (2004)
- Orchestral Suites. Turku Philharmonic Orchestra, Leif Segerstam. Ondine ODE1270-2 (2015)
- Orjan poika. Suomen Laula Choir, Finnish Radio Symphony Orchestra. Jussi Jalas. Broadcast on BBC Radio 3, 23 August 2018
- Piano Trio in A Major. Kreeta-Julia Heikkilä, Tuomas Lehto, Roope Gröndahl. YouTube.
- Songs and Orchestral Music. Susan Gritton, BBC Concert Orchestra, Martyn Brabbins. Dutton Epoch CDLX 7272 (2011)
- Violin Sonatas. Nina Karmon, Oliver Triendl. CPO 555 148-2 (2018)
