= Sigfús Einarsson =

Icelandic composer (1877–1939)

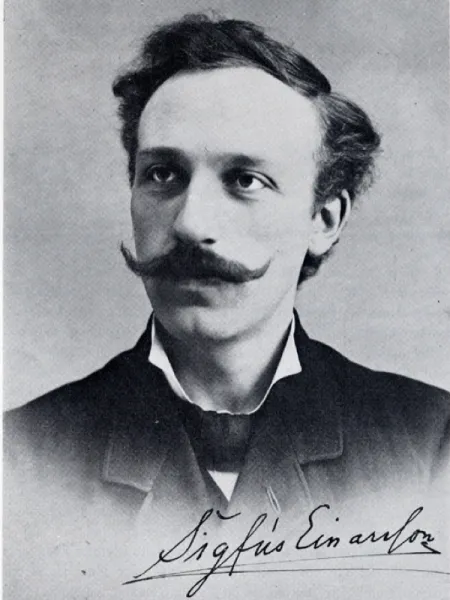
- Born: 30 January 1877; Skúmsstaðir, Eyrarbakki
- Died: 10 May 1939 (aged 62); Reykjavík, Iceland
- Occupations: Composer; organist; conductor; music critic
- Spouse: Valborg Hellemann (m. 1906)

Sigfús Einarsson (30 January 1877 – 10 May 1939) was an Icelandic composer, organist, and music critic. He was a pioneer in Icelandic music in the early twentieth century and is particularly well known for his songs, many of which remain highly popular.

== Career ==
Sigfús Einarsson was born at Skúmsstaðir in Eyrarbakki in Southern Iceland. The son of a merchant, he was raised in a musical household and at age 12 was already a member of the Báran choir, one of Iceland's earliest mixed choirs. At age 15, he went to Reykjavík to study at the local Latin School (Menntaskólinn í Reykjavík), where he also founded and established a student choir. He went to Copenhagen to study law, but quit his studies to focus on music, which would be his main profession in life. In Copenhagen, he studied composition and music theory with August Enna, and met his future wife, the Danish singer and pianist Valborg Hellemann (later Valborg Einarsson).

Sigfús and his wife moved back to Iceland in 1906 and would become instrumental in Reykjavík's growing musical life for the next decades. He taught singing in several schools, and in 1911 he established the choral society Söngfélagið 17. júní, which he conducted for nearly a decade. In 1913 he became organist at Reykjavík Cathedral and conductor of the cathedral choir. In 1921, he was involved in establishing the Reykjavík Orchestra, which he conducted until 1928 and which eventually grew to become the Iceland Symphony Orchestra. He was the music director (söngmálastjóri) of the 1930 Alþingi Festival, where he was responsible for creating a festival choir, the largest mixed choir that had ever performed in Iceland.

Sigfús Einarsson was also active as a music critic and publisher. He published the 2-volume Íslenzkt söngvasafn (1915–1916) which contains 300 songs in simple accompaniments for piano or harmonium, and became the most popular publication of its kind in Iceland. He was also an influential music critic for the Morgunblaðið newspaper.

Sigfús wrote several songs for voice and accompaniment that have become highly popular in Iceland, including Draumalandið (Dreamland), Gígjan (The Violin), Sofnar lóa (The Golden Plover Falls Asleep), and Augun bláu (The Blue Eyes), all of which were published by Wilhelm Hansen in Copenhagen in 1904. The earliest recording of Draumalandið, by tenor Pétur Á. Jónsson, dates from 1912 and is one of the first recordings of an Icelandic song. Sigfús also wrote a set of mass responses that were sung in Icelandic churches for decades (Messusöngvar, 1934), as well as several other original works and arrangements for choirs. In 1937, he was awarded the Knight's Cross of the Order of the Falcon for his work on behalf of Icelandic music.

Sigfús and Valborg Einarsson had two children, both of whom became well-known musicians: the singer Elsa Sigfúss and the violinist Einar Sigfússon. Sigfús Einarsson died in 1939, only 62 years old; after his death, Valborg moved back to Denmark. A biography of Sigfús Einarsson was published in Reykjavík in 1972.

== Selected compositions ==
- Icelandic songs for male chorus. Wilhelm Hansen, 1903.
- Four songs (Draumalandið, Augun bláu, Sofnar lóa, Gígjan). Wilhelm Hansen. 1904.
- Pjetur Guðjohnsen, cantata for soprano, male chorus and organ. Sigfús Eymundsson, 1912.
- Móðir mín í kví, kví (arranged). 1913.
- Four Icelandic Folk Songs (Fjögur íslenzk þjóðlög), arranged for mixed chorus. Hljóðfærahús Reykjavíkur, 1929.
