= Artturi Järviluoma =

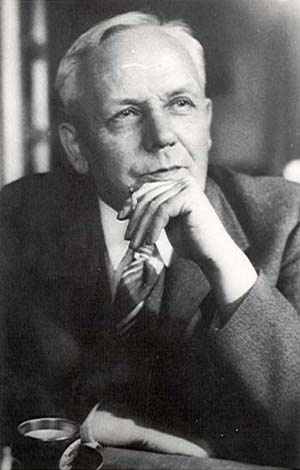
Artturi Järviluoma

Kustaa Artturi Järviluoma (9 August 1879 – 31 January 1942) was a Finnish journalist, screenwriter and author. Until 1902, he went by the name Jernström. He is best known for his play Pohjalaisia (The Ostrobothnians), which later formed the basis for a popular opera by Leevi Madetoja.

== Biography ==
Järviluoma was born in Alavus and attended the Lyceum at Vaasa but dropped out of school. He passed his matriculation examination as a private student of the Helsinki Real Lyceum in 1901. He then attended the University of Helsinki, studying mathematics from 1902 to 1903 and then law from 1904 to 1909, but he did not complete a degree.

He was a founding member of the Finnish Dramatists' Union in the 1920s and served as both secretary and chairman during the 1930s. He was also a founding member of the Finnish Journalists' Association and the South Ostrobothnians Association (1941).

In 1910, Järviluoma married Lyyli Ahde. They had two children: Maire and Juha.

The Finnish Literature Society has maintained an archive of Järviluoma's work since 1998. It contains his original manuscripts, photos, scrapbooks and other material. Streets have been named after him in Helsinki, Alavus, Nurmo, Teuva and Lapua. His birthplace is now a memorial.
