= Alma Kuula =

Finnish singer (1884–1941)

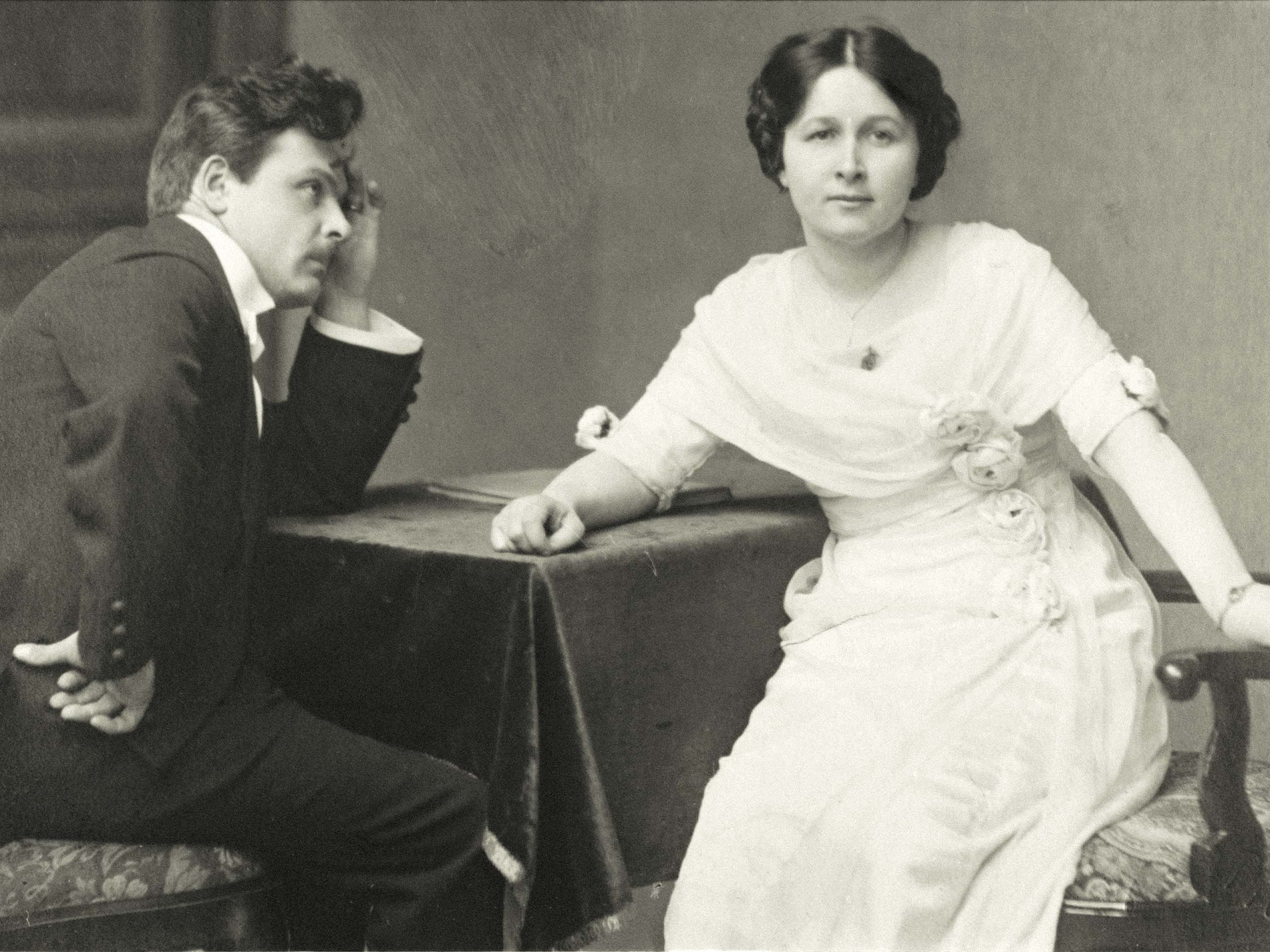
- Alma Kuula, with her husband Toivo, in 1916
- Born: Alma Johanna Silventoinen; 5 February 1884; St Petersburg, Russia
- Died: 8 October 1941 (aged 57); Lappeenranta, Finland
- Spouse: Toivo Kuula (m. 1914; died 1918)

Alma Kuula (née Silventoinen; 1884–1941) was a Finnish operatic soprano and pianist, and the wife of composer Toivo Kuula.

Born in Saint Petersburg to Finnish industrialist Pekka Silventoinen and Johanna ('Hanna') née Häggson, and raised mostly in Lappeenranta, Alma Silventoinen graduated from a girls' school in Helsinki in 1901.

In 1903, she began studying first the piano, and subsequently voice, at the Helsinki Music Institute (later Sibelius Academy), completing her studies there in 1908.

She went on to further her voice training in Milan and Paris from 1908 until her marriage in 1914. She toured extensively throughout the 1910s and 1920s, in Finland and around Europe.

Alma Silventoinen met Toivo Kuula in 1906, and they fell in love, but as he was already married and could not obtain a divorce until 1912, they were only able to get married in 1914. The couple had one daughter, Sinikka Kuula, born in 1917; she later became a professional pianist, and accompanied her mother at concerts.

Most of Toivo Kuula's lied production was written for her, and his 1907 song Tuijotin tulehen kauan (lit. 'Long I Stared Into the Fire'; op. 2 no. 2) is dedicated to her. She is also considered his muse and inspiration for many of his other works.

In 1918, Toivo Kuula was murdered by an unknown assailant at the victory celebrations of the Finnish Civil War in Vyborg. She never got over her loss, and dedicated the rest of her life to performing her late husband's music in his memory. In the 1930s she recorded some of his works, including Tuijotin tulehen kauan (His Master's Voice, 1937).

In later years, Alma Kuula resided in Helsinki. However, in 1941, she was scheduled to give a concert in Lappeenranta, but on her way there she suffered a heart attack, and died, very close to her childhood home.
