= Henri-Claude Fantapié =

French conductor and composer

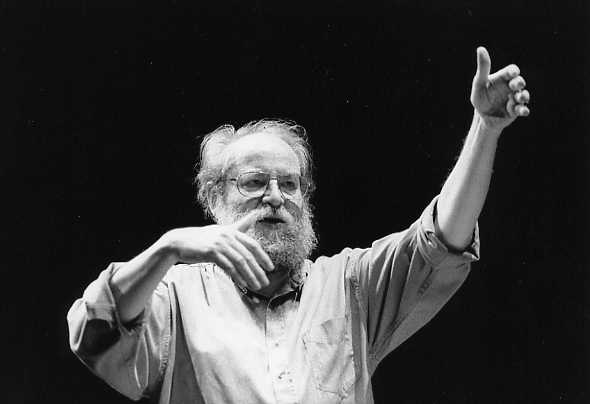
JPSSD

Henri-Claude Fantapié (born 1938 in Nice, France) is a French conductor and composer. He was a pupil of Marc-Cesar Scotto, Eugène Bigot, Igor Markevitch for conducting, and Henri Dutilleux for composition.

== Early life ==
Fantapié studied clarinet, harmony and counterpoint at the Conservatoire de Nice with Eugène Gosselin and René Saorgin, and conducting (for which he won first prize in 1958), chamber music and song at the Académie de musique Rainier III of Monaco (with Marc-César Scotto, Marcel Gonzalès and Lucien Marzo). He is the grand-nephew of the composer and conductor César Fantapié and nephew of the pianist Blanche Fantapié. In Paris, he studied conducting with Eugène Bigot, composition with Henri Dutilleux and musicology with Jacques Chailley. He won the 1960 Concours International des Jeunes chefs d'orchestre de Besançon, for both conducting and composition.

== Career ==
From 1959 to 1963 he was director of Orchestre de chambre de la Fondation de Monaco. From 1964 to 1982 he was director of Les Solistes de Paris, and from 1972 was director of La Jeune Philharmonie de Seine-Saint-Denis. In 1982 he was made director of the Dionysos Chamber Orchestra.

He has been invited to conduct in England, Sweden, Finland, Germany, Netherlands, Italy, Columbia.

In 1965 he was made director of the Conservatoire Municipal Agréé de Musique et de Danse de Noisy le Sec, and was Manager of the Association des Conservatoires de Seine-Saint-Denis from 1970 to 2000, as well as of the Fédération des Unions de Conservatoires, which is a member of the European Union of Music Schools.

From 1964 to 1972, he was Manager of the Union of French conductors and from 1975 was professor of conducting at the Centre Polyphonique de Paris, and then in Seine-Saint-Denis from 1980.

He was made a Knight of the Order of the Lion of Finland in 1999.

== Bibliography ==
- Le chef d'orchestre art et technique (L'Harmattan 2005)
- Histoire de la musique finlandaise (Boréales)
- Larousse dictionary of Music (Nordic music)
- Restituer une œuvre musicale, de l'œuvre imaginée à l'œuvre partagée (L’Harmattan-2009)
