= Symphony No. 2 (Madetoja) =

Symphony in four movements by Leevi Madetoja

- by Leevi Madetoja
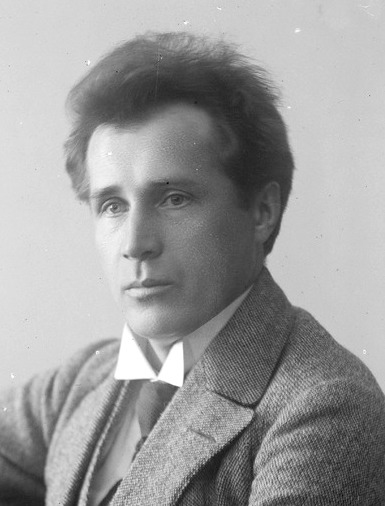
- The composer (c. 1920)
- Key: E♭ major
- Opus: 35
- Composed: 1916–1918
- Dedication: Anna Madetoja (Leevi's mother)
- Duration: Approx. 42 minutes
- Movements: 4

Premiere
- Date: 17 December 1918
- Location: Helsinki, Finland
- Conductor: Robert Kajanus
- Performers: Helsinki Philharmonic Orchestra

The Symphony No. 2 in E♭ major, Op. 35, is a four-movement orchestral composition by the Finnish composer Leevi Madetoja, who wrote the piece from 1916–18 immediately following the success of his First Symphony (1916). Composed during the Finnish Civil War, the Second stands as "the most significant musical document" of the conflict and finds its composer, "deeply scarred by the experience", reflecting upon national tragedy and personal loss (his brother, Yrjö, and close friend, Toivo Kuula, both perished during the hostilities). Accordingly, Madetoja's Second is the longest and most dramatic of his three essays in the form and, perhaps for this reason, is the most popular of the set.

Robert Kajanus and the Helsinki Philharmonic Orchestra premiered the work in Helsinki, Finland on 17 December 1918. The critics received the premiere enthusiastically and, thus, the new piece firmly established Madetoja as the vanguard of Finnish music. In 1934, Madetoja (retroactively) dedicated the symphony to his late mother.

== History ==
As the year 1918 arrived, the embers of the First World War ignited into civil war (27 January – 15 May 1918) between Tsarist Russia and the Grand Duchy of Finland, which sought independence. Madetoja was still at work on his new symphony—a composition in which he had decided to contemplate Finland's fate in the wake of world war and a revolution in Russia—when the Finnish Civil War brought personal tragedy. On 9 April, Red Guards captured Yrjö Madetoja, Leevi's only surviving sibling, in Viipuri, where he was executed along with other officials. It fell to Leevi to break the news to the family:

I received a telegram from Viipuri yesterday that made my blood run cold: "Yrjö fell on the 13th day of April" was the message in all its terrible brevity. This unforeseen, shocking news fills us with unutterable grief. Death, that cruel companion of war and persecution, has not therefore spared us either; it has come to visit us, to snatch one of us as its victim. Oh when will we see the day when the forces of hatred vanish from the world and the good spirits of peace can return to heal the wounds inflicted by suffering and misery?

— Leevi Madetoja, in a 5 May 1916 letter to his mother, Anna

A month later during May Day celebrations, Kuula got into an altercation with a group of White Army officers and, in the heat of the moment, was shot to death, dying on 18 May. These two losses deeply upset Madetoja and likely found expression in the symphony; the epilogue Madetoja affixed to the work is one of pain and resignation, "I have fought my battle and now withdraw".

The 17 December 1918 premiere of the Second Symphony under Kajanus's baton was extraordinarily well received. Writing in Uusi Suometar, Katila, for example, proclaimed Madetoja's latest work to be "The most remarkable achievement in our music since the monumental series of Sibelius", and certainly the Second Symphony remains Madetoja's most popular. (At the time, Sibelius had written five symphonies, although the Fifth Symphony had not yet reached its definitive form, which arrived in 1919.) The 17 December 1918 premiere of Madetoja's Second Symphony similarly impressed Sibelius, who was again in attendance. (Upon his mother's death in 1934, Madetoja retroactively dedicated the Second Symphony to her.) At this time, Madetoja also composed a piece for solo piano in memory of his brother, originally titled Improvisation in Memory of my Brother Yrjö and published in Lumikukkia magazine in 1918. In 1919, Madetoja expanded the piece into a three-movement suite, The Garden of Death, Op. 41. The suite, which shares melodic motifs with the Second Symphony, does not mention Yrjö by name.

== Structure ==
The symphony is in four-movements, with I and II linked and III and IV linked:

1. Allegro moderato –
2. Andante
3. Allegro non troppo –
4. Epilogue: Andantino

== Discography ==
Thus far, Madetoja's Second Symphony has been recorded only by Nordic orchestras, usually as a component piece of a larger recording project of Madetoja's major orchestral works, such as those by Petri Sakari and the Iceland Symphony Orchestra (1991–92), Arvo Volmer and the Oulu Symphony Orchestra (1998–2006), and John Storgårds and the Helsinki Philharmonic Orchestra (2012–13).

Conductor	Orchestra	Recorded	Duration	Label
Paavo Rautio	Tampere Philharmonic Orchestra	1981	42:30	Finlandia (FACD 011)
Petri Sakari	Iceland Symphony Orchestra	1992	43:26	Chandos (CHAN 9115)
Arvo Volmer	Oulu Symphony Orchestra	1998	40:44	Alba Records (ABCD 132)
John Storgårds	Helsinki Philharmonic Orchestra	2012	41:33	Ondine (ODE 1212-2)

In his review of the Sakari and Volmer efforts, the American Record Guide's Tom Godell singles out the Second as the composer's "greatest symphony", describing the first movement as "richly melodic", the second movement as a "barbaric Andante" modeled on the second movement of Sibelius's First Symphony, and—in a less positive note—the third movement as a "monotonous scherzo ... [that] fails to hold the listener's interest. The battle scene from Ein Heldenleben this ain't". As for the performers, Godell gives the advantage to Volmer and the Oulu Symphony Orchestra, the "gorgeous playing" of which "transform[s] this little-known work into a deeply affecting musical experience"; Sakari and the Iceland Symphony Orchestra, on the other hand, at times make Madetoja's "exciting" symphony feel "dull and repetitious".

== Notes, references, and sources ==
=== Sources ===
Books

- Salmenhaara, Erkki (2011). "Leevi Madetoja". Biografiskt lexikon för Finland (Biographical Dictionary of the Republic of Finland) (in Swedish). Vol. M to Z (4 ed.).
- Tawaststjerna, Erik (1997). Sibelius: Volume 3, 1914–1957. (Robert Layton, English translation). London: Faber and Faber.

CD liner notes

- Korhonen, Kimmo (2013b). Leevi Madetoja: Symphony No. 2, Kullervo, Elegy (booklet). John Storgårds & Helsinki Philharmonic. Helsinki, Finland: Ondine. p. 4–6. ODE1212-2.
- Pulliainen, Riitta (2000a). Madetoja Orchestral Works 1: I Have Fought My Battle (booklet). Arvo Volmer & Oulu Symphony Orchestra. Tampere, Finland: Alba. p. 4–6. ABCD 132.
- Rännäli, Mika (2000). Intimate Garden: Leevi Madetoja Complete Piano Works (booklet). Mika Rännäli. Tampere, Finland: Alba. p. 4–8. ABCD 206.
- Salmenhaara, Erkki (1992b). Madetoja, L.: Symphonies Nos. 1 and 2 (booklet). Petri Sakari & Iceland Symphony Orchestra. Colchester, England: Chandos. p. 4–6. CHAN 9115.

Journal articles

- Godell, Tom (2001). "Madetoja: Symphony 1; Concert Overture; Pastoral Suite; Rustic Scenes". American Record Guide. 64 (2): 126–27. (subscription required)
