= L. Onerva =

Finnish poet (1882–1972)

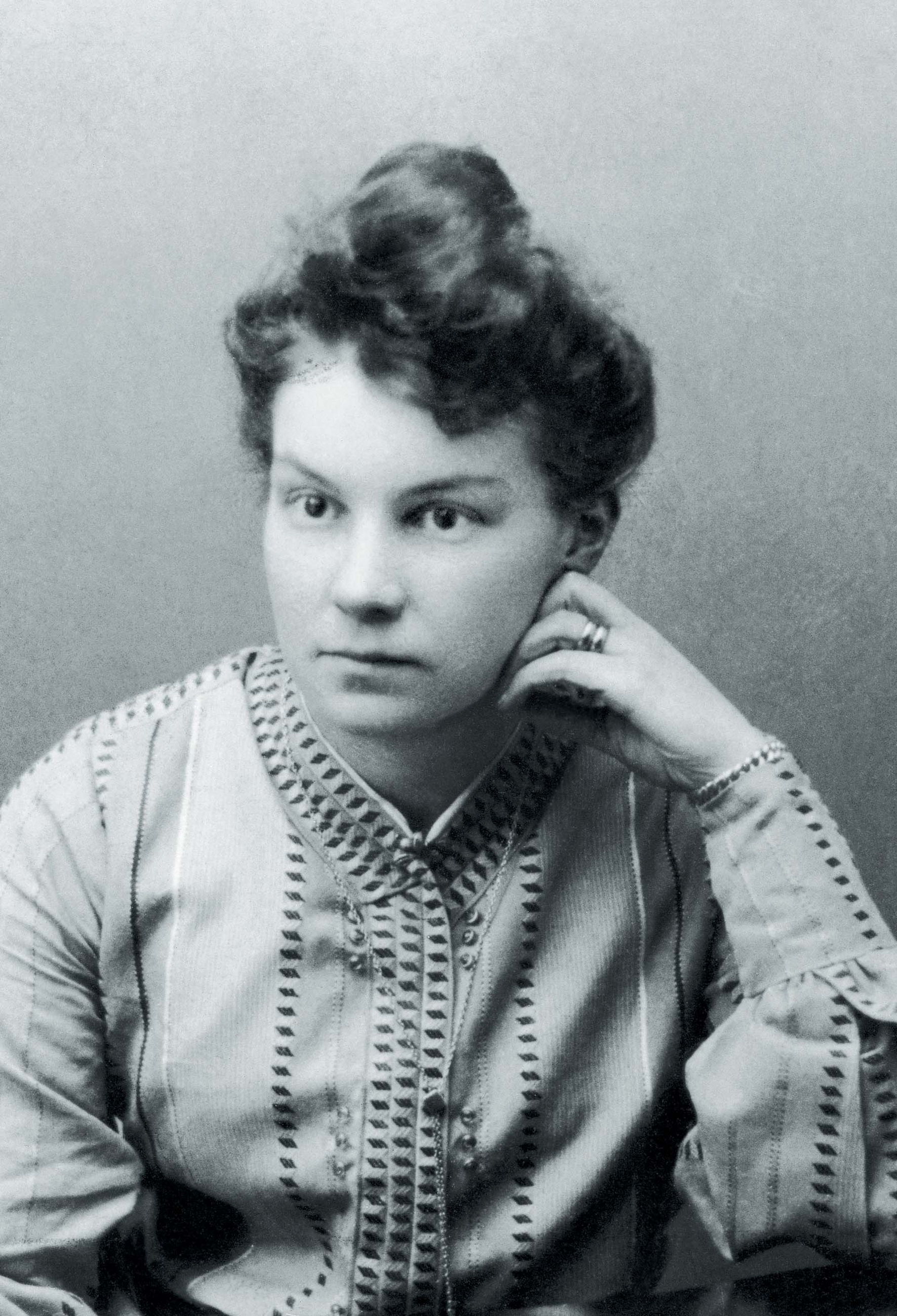
- Born: Hilja Onerva Lehtinen; 28 April 1882; Helsinki, Finland
- Died: 1 March 1972 (aged 89); Helsinki, Finland
- Occupations: Poet, critic, translator
- Spouses: Väinö Streng; Leevi Madetoja (1918–1947)
- Partner: Eino Leino
- Writing career
- Pen name: L. Onerva
- Language: Finnish
- Period: 1904–1952
- Notable awards: State literature prizes, Aleksis Kivi Prize, Pro Finlandia Medal

L. Onerva (real name Hilja Onerva Lehtinen, 28 April 1882 – 1 March 1972) was a Finnish poet. Onerva also wrote short stories and novels and worked as a translator and critic. In her works, she often dealt with tension in women's lives concerning freedom and commitment. She is also remembered for her complicated relationship with Eino Leino, as well as her marriage to the composer Leevi Madetoja.

== Biography ==
=== Childhood ===
L. Onerva was the only child of Johan and Serafina Lehtinen. Onerva had only a handful of memories of her mother, because her mother was interned at a mental institution when Onerva was seven years old. After that, Onerva was cared for by her paternal grandmother, who – along with her father – became very close to her. Her father moved to Kotka in 1893 to become the building manager of a sawmill, but Onvera stayed behind in Helsinki to attend school. She went to a school for little children and then, at the age of nine, enrolled at the Helsingin Suomalainen Tyttökoulu (Helsinki Finnish Girls' School) to attend its prep class. In 1893 she began a five-year school for girls.

Onerva enjoyed her studies, teachers, and peers and performed well at the girls' school. After the girls' school, she continued into secondary school (jatko-opisto), where she engaged in various extracurricular activities. Onerva was talented: she sang, wrote, painted, and recital. In continuing her studies, she studied French and acquired a preliminary teacher's degree in 1902. After two years of secondary education, Onerva began to prepare for her matriculation examination as a private student of Helsingin Suomalainen Yhteiskoulu since her secondary institution did not offer the possibility to take the examination. She graduated in 1909 with grades just a few points below excellent. On her final year of schooling, she pondered her career and future. She had a tough choice ahead of her, since she was interested in various different disciplines. At secondary school, Onerva had been inspired by theater and she seriously entertained the possibility to become a professional actor. In autumn 1902 Onerva enrolled in the department of history and philology at the University of Helsinki, but she never graduated.

=== Adult life ===
In 1905, Onerva became engaged to Väinö Streng, whom she had met in a university nation. They got married in October that year. The young lovers moved to Räisälä on the Karelian Isthmus, to the family estate of the Strengs. However, Onerva missed her childhood home and longed after her father, whom she visited often during early into the marriage. Later on the couple moved back to Helsinki. Onerva and Streng were constantly struggling financially. Onerva would get some income by working as an interim teacher and by opening a cinema with her husband in Lahti. The business did not succeed, and Onerva had to ask her father for money. In the spring of 1908, Streng and Onerva separated, but they continued to write to one another. Later, the couple divorced for good.

Onerva met Eino Leino for the first time in the beginning of the 1900s while still studying before her matriculation exam. She requested Leino to compose a festive poem to the convention of the school. Onerva asked Leino what career she should pursue. Leino then replied jokingly: "You should get married." Onerva and Leino met again later and fell in love passionately. They never married, though, and only lived together when abroad. Onerva and Leino lived abroad together for five months staying all over Europe. Onerva and Leino were constrained by financial woe and the trip was not particularly successful. Onerva meant much for Leino: she was his lover but also a companion and like a mother. Leino affected Onerva's work, too. Gradually, their relationship transformed into friendship, and they remained in good terms despite Onerva's marriage with Leevi Madetoja and Leino's many marriages. Onerva was supportive of Leino until his death and helped him with for instance his finances. When Leino died in 1926, Onerva began writing his biography. The biography was originally intended to be released the next year, but it wasn't until 1932 that it was published. Onerva has been shadowed by Leino, even though Leino himself never downplayed Onerva's significance. However, Onerva's work and person have always been paid less attention to than those of Eino Leino.

Onerva's second marriage was to Leevi Madetoja. Onerva and Madetoja met through Leino at a time when Madetoja was composing music for Leino's plays. Madetoja was five years her junior and a talented young composer. Their acquaintance gradually deepened into love. Their engagement was thrice announced in 1913, and they told everyone that they had been married. In truth, Onerva and Madetoja were not married until 1918. The marriage was childless, even though they wished to have children. They stayed together until Madetoja's death, but the marriage was affected by quarrels and alcoholism, which both of them suffered from.

The 1920s were prolific for Onerva, but by the end of the decade her health had started to decline. She was intermittently hospitalized for her heart, arthritis, and nerves. Despite her illnesses, in the 1930s Onerva finished her poem collections Yö ja päivä (Night and Day) and Rajalla (On the Border) and a collection of short stories Häistä hautajaisiin (From Wedding to Funeral). In the end of the 1930s, Onerva was transferred to Kivelä Hospital and from there to Veikkola's sanitarium because of her severe alcoholism. In 1942, Onerva was admitted to Nikkilä Mental Hospital. Madetoja's health was in decline at the same time, and he was unable to support his interned wife like before. In hospital, Onerva was lonely and focused on writing poems and started sketching again. During this time, she produced thousands of poems and sketches. Some of these poems were published in a 1945 collection Pursi (Yacht) and four years later in a collection titled Kuilu ja tähdet (Gorge and the Stars). Leevi Madetoja died in 1947, and the next year Onerva was released from the mental hospital with assistance from her friends. The collection of poems Iltarusko (Dusk) from 1952 was her last publication, but she continued to write poems prolifically until her death. Onerva died on 1 March 1972 at the age of 89.

== Literature and significance ==
Onerva was a very contested and radical author of her time who had the courage to write against conventional morality. In her works, Onerva emphasized the individual's right to act freely and make choices independently. Her works were contentious among her contemporaries, but they were also successful: for her works, Onerva received seven State literature prizes in 1908–1910, 1921, 1923, 1927, and 1933. In 1944, she was awarded the Aleksis Kivi Prize and in 1967, the Pro Finlandia Medal. The influence of Eino Leino's poetry can be seen in the poems of her early career, and later her works were influenced by the literary movement Tulenkantajat, of whom she was a member.

Onerva's literary career began when she sent some of her poems to be evaluated by Maila Talvio in 1899. Talvio did not see herself as apt to review them and introduced Onerva to J. H. Erkko to ask for his comments on her poetry. Erkko mentored her, gave her writing tips and tried to find a publisher for her. She also gave her her future pen name "L. Onerva". Although they could not find a publisher for her, they managed to publish some of her poems in a winter album entitled Nuori Suomi ("Yong Finland"). Onerva's first poetry collection, Sekasointuja, was published in 1904 with the help of Albert Gebhard. The poems in the collection were written by Onerva mainly between 1900 and 1903. The collection was well received by both critics and readers. Young readers were particularly attracted by its boldness and unconventional nature.

In 1905, Onerva began to write short stories that eventually became parts of a novel. The novel was named Mirdja, after its protagonist. Onerva was interested in symbolism and decadence and those influences can be seen in Mirdja. The novel embodies decadent narcissism: Mirdja admires her own beauty and longs for a man to admire her as well. Mirdja encounters problems trying to reconcile the individuality of an independent woman with love. Mirdja experiments with several female roles and ways to love. Her experimentation and relationships, however, turn out unsuccessful. Mirdja parallels many aspects of Onerva's life: Mirdja marries Runar and Onerva marries Väinö Streng, and both Mirdja and Onerva notice that married life does not meet their expectations. Furthermore, Mirdja features the character Rolf Tanne, who has been speculated to be based on Eino Leino. Mirdja was published in 1908 and, initially, caused a lot of reprehension for its content advocating erotic freedom and its contempt for traditional family values and attracted frown from, for instance, some women. The novel was positively received by young intellectuals, who liked its depiction of the thoughts and emotions of an independent-minded woman. Mirdja earned Onerva the 1908 State Literature Prize with 1,000 Finnish marks worth of prize money. Conferring the prize on Onerva incited opposition, and the Kotimaa magazine published a women's objection in response to the nomination. Onerva utilized her own life experiences also in a novel published in 1913 called Inari. In it, Inari is a woman whose love wavers between two men, the artist Porkka and the pianist Alvia. The men are based on Eino Leino and Leevi Madetoja. Onerva made the admission that Inari's love life and fate were based on hers.

=== Journalism ===
During her career, Onerva often wrote for newspapers. The paper Sunnuntai started printing in 1915 with Eino Leino as its editor-in-chief. The paper was sustained for two years and Onerva acted as its copy editor (toimitussihteeri). In addition to these duties, Onerva actively wrote for Sunnuntai. She published her poems from the collection Liesilauluja and, for instance, the first chapter of her novel Yksinäisiä. Onerva also contributed literary criticism to the paper and translated foreign text for it. In addition to Sunnuntai, Onerva wrote theater reviews for the right wing socialist Työn Valta founded in 1917. before Sunnuntai and Työn valta, Onerva had assisted the cultural liberal Päivä paper (1907–1911). Onerva also wrote literature reviews for Helsingin Sanomat in 1910–1911 and 1925–1926.

== Works ==
=== Poetry ===
- Sekasointuja (1904). Helsinki: Lilius & Hertzberg
- Runoja (1908)
- Särjetyt jumalat. Runoja (1910). Helsinki: Otava
- Iltakellot. Runoja (1912). Helsinki: Kustannusosakeyhtiö Kirja
- Kaukainen kevät (1914). Helsinki: Otava
- Liesilauluja (1916). Helsinki: Otava
- Murattiköynnös. Helsinki: Ahjo. 1918.
- Lyhtylasien laulu (1919)
- Elämän muukalainen. Sikermä unikuvia (1921). Helsinki: Kustannusosakeyhtiö Kirja
- Jerusalemin suutari (1921)
- Sielujen sota (1923)
- Maan tomu-uurna. Runoja (1925). Helsinki: Otava
- Liekki. Runoja (1927). Helsinki: Otava
- Yö ja päivä (1933)
- Pursi. Kohtalovirsiä (1945). Helsinki: Otava
- Kuilu ja tähdet (1949)
- Iltarusko (1952)
- Valittuja runoja (1919)
- Valittuja runoja 1–2 (1927)
- Anhava, Helena, ed. (1984). Etsin suurta tulta: valitut runot 1904–1952. Helsinki: Otava. ISBN 951-1-07819-4.
- Toisillemme. L. Onerva–Eino Leino, Valikoima runoja (1986)
- Mäkelä, Hannu, ed. (2010). Liekkisydän: valitut runot. Helsinki: Tammi. ISBN 978-951-31-5248-2.

=== Short story collections ===
- Murtoviivoja (1909)
- Nousukkaita (1911)
- Mies ja nainen (1912)
- Vangittuja sieluja (1915)
- Neitsyt Maarian lahja (1918)
- Salainen syy (1923)
- Uponnut maailma ynnä muita satukuvia unen ja toden mailta (1925)
- Häistä hautajaisiin (1934)
- Pursi (1945)
- Iltarusko (1952)

=== Novels ===
- Mirdja (1908)
- Inari (1913)
- Yksinäisiä (1917)

=== Poetry, as translator ===
- Ranskalaista laulurunoutta. Musset/Verlaine/Baudelaire (1912). Helsinki: Otava

=== Other ===
- Runoilija ja ihminen I–II (1932; yksiosaisena 1979). (Eino Leino -elämäkerta)
- Valitut teokset (1956)
- Yölauluja, L. Onervan ja Leevi Madetojan kirjeitä 1910–1946, SKS 2006, toim. Anna Makkonen ja Marja-Leena Tuurna.

== See also ==
- Finnish poetry
- Hannu Mäkelä
- Poet and Muse
