= Symphony No. 1 (Madetoja) =

Symphony in three movements by Leevi Madetoja

- by Leevi Madetoja
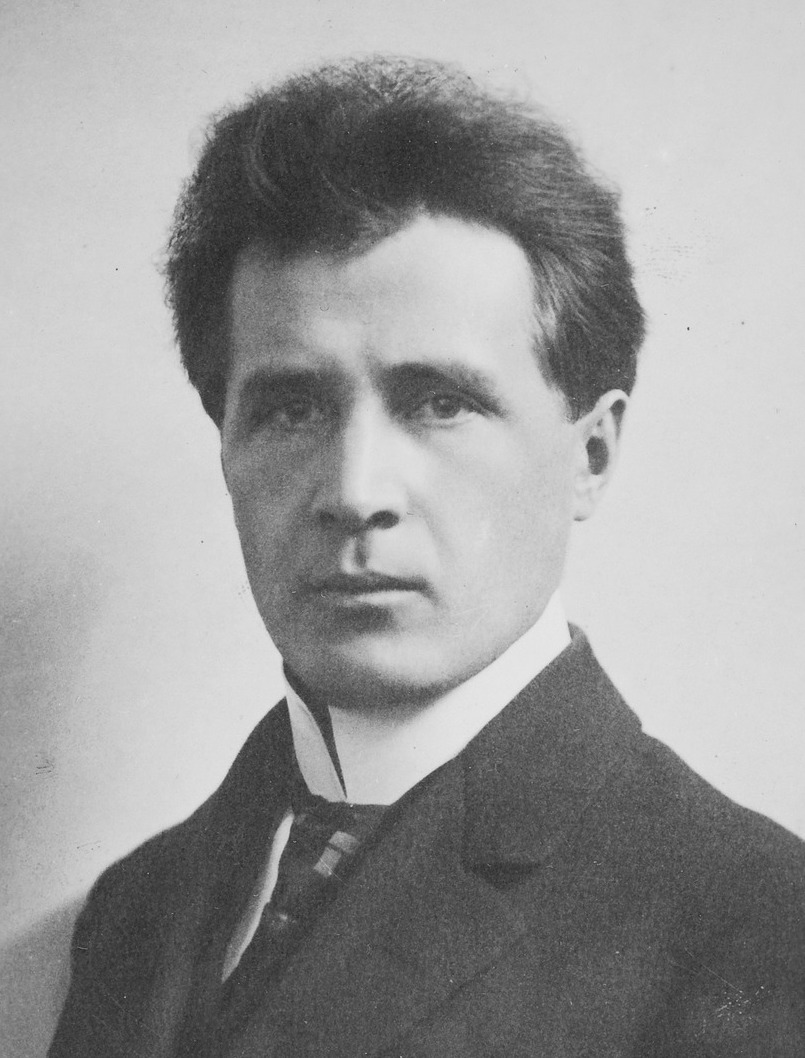
- The composer (c. 1915–1918)
- Key: F major
- Opus: 29
- Composed: 1914–1916
- Dedication: Robert Kajanus
- Duration: Approx. 22 minutes
- Movements: 3

Premiere
- Date: 10 February 1916
- Location: Helsinki, Finland
- Conductor: Leevi Madetoja
- Performers: Helsinki Philharmonic Orchestra

The Symphony No. 1 in F major, Op. 29, is a three-movement orchestral composition by the Finnish composer Leevi Madetoja, who wrote the piece from 1914–16 at the dawn of his professional career. Although late-Romantic in style, the symphony carefully eschews the extravagance and overindulgence typical of debut efforts, placing it among the most "mature" and restrained of first symphonies. Accordingly, the First is the shortest and most concentrated of Madetoja's three essays in the form and is the only one of his symphonies not to adhere to the traditional four-movement symphonic template.

The Helsinki Philharmonic Orchestra premiered the work in Helsinki, Finland on 10 February 1916 under the composer's baton. The critics received the premiere warmly, concluding that an important symphonic talent had arrived on the Finnish music scene, the new work's echoes of Sibelius and Tchaikovsky notwithstanding.

== History ==
Despite the ongoing hostilities of World War I, Madetoja traveled to Russia in September 1914 to take up the conductorship of the Viipuri Orchestra (1914–16). Madetoja found the orchestra in a state of relative devastation: he was able to piece together 19 musicians, a reality that forced him to spend much of his time finding and arranging material for such an undersized ensemble. And yet, he somehow found the time to begin the biggest project of his young career: a symphony. During the composition process, which Madetoja's conducting duties repeatedly disturbed (for example, he completed the finale just before the scheduled premiere), Madetoja received a letter of encouragement from Jean Sibelius, Finland's greatest symphonist (as well as Madetoja's former teacher):

What you wrote about your symphonic business delights me exceedingly. I feel that you will achieve your greatest triumphs in that genre, for I consider that you have precisely the properties that make a symphonic composer. This is my firm belief.

— Jean Sibelius, in an October 1914 letter to his former pupil

Madetoja officially joined the ranks of symphonic composers on 10 February 1916; the Helsinki Philharmonic Orchestra premiered the new work under the composer's own baton (Robert Kajanus, the founder and chief conductor of the orchestra, was the dedicatee). Sibelius's "firm belief" indeed proved prescient, as the critics received the new work warmly; the general impression was that an important new symphonic talent had arrived. For example, the Finnish critic Evert Katila praised Madetoja's symphony in Uusi Suometar, writing, "The symphony appeals through the logic of its construction and the translucent brightness of its orchestration."

Sibelius, who was in attendance, also remarked upon the symphony's beauty. Nevertheless, the teacher eyed his former student's maturation somewhat warily. For example, when some reviews of the First Symphony discerned within Madetoja's music the influence of Sibelius (for example, Karl Wasenius in Hufvudstadsbladet), he worried his former pupil might take offence at the comparison and mistook Madetoja's characteristic "melancholia" for "sulkiness". Suddenly, Sibelius found Madetoja arrogant and watched with concern as he drew closer to Kajanus, with whom Sibelius had an on-again-off-again friendship/rivalry. "Met Madetoja, who—I'm sorry to say—has become pretty bumptious after his latest success," Sibelius fretted to his diary. "Kajanus smothers him with flattery and he hasn't the breeding to see it for what it is".

== Orchestration ==
- Woodwind: piccolo, 3 flutes, 2 oboes, cor anglais, 2 clarinets, bass clarinet, 2 bassoons
- Brass: 4 horns, 3 trumpets, 3 trombones, tuba
- Percussion: timpani, triangle, cymbals, bass drum, snare drum, tambourine
- Strings: violins, violas, cellos, double basses, harp

== Structure ==
The First Symphony is in three movements and, as such, is the only one of Madetoja's three symphonies to eschew the traditional four-movement symphonic format. The movements are as follows:

1. Allegro
2. Lento misterioso
3. Finale: Allegro vivace

=== I. Allegro ===
The first movement is in traditional sonata form; the first subject—Allegro—is in F major and 3/4 time.

The "dreamy" second subject (Meno allegro), in D♭ major, is reminiscent of Tchaikovsky; relative to the first movement, it is, according to the Finnish musicologist Erkki Salmenhaara, "from a different world, an oasis of calm which brings the symphonic process to a standstill".

=== II. Lento misterioso ===
The second movement, the slowest in tempo and the longest in duration of the three, is "redolent with a deep Finnish melancholy". The first subject—Lento misterioso—consists of a dissonant, siren-like motif on flutes juxtaposed against a lugubrious solo cello, their interplay periodically interrupted by ominous interjections from the brass. Half-way through the movement, the second subject—Poco tranquillo—appears: a delicate woodwind dialogue in F♯ minor between oboe, clarinet, and flute, supported by string bass pizzicati, strings, and horns. Although this passage recalls the third movement of Sibelius's Third Symphony, it is by no means derivative; the subject is, according to Finnish musicologist Erkki Salmenhaara, "all Madetoja's own". The movement ends with the return of the first subject, but modified such that solo cor anglais takes up the original cello line.

== Discography ==
Thus far, Madetoja's First Symphony has been recorded only by Nordic orchestras, usually as a component piece of a larger recording project of Madetoja's major orchestral works, such as those by Petri Sakari and the Iceland Symphony Orchestra (1991–92), Arvo Volmer and the Oulu Symphony Orchestra (1998–2006), and John Storgårds and the Helsinki Philharmonic Orchestra (2012–13).

| Conductor | Orchestra | Recorded | Duration | Label |
|---|---|---|---|---|
| Petri Sakari | Iceland Symphony Orchestra | 1992 | 23:20 | Chandos (CHAN 9115) |
| Leif Segerstam | Finnish Radio Symphony Orchestra | 1996 | 25:21 | Finlandia (FACD 015) |
| Arvo Volmer | Oulu Symphony Orchestra | 1999 | 20:07 | Alba Records (ABCD 144) |
| John Storgårds | Helsinki Philharmonic Orchestra | 2013 | 21:13 | Ondine (ODE 1211-2) |

In his review of the Sakari and Volmer efforts, the American Record Guide's Tom Godell applauds Madetoja for his ability to "craft beautiful, swirling rainbows of vivid color in every one of his scores," but nevertheless faults the First Symphony for is "lack of memorable themes or smooth transitions," asserting that "all too often Madetoja simply drops one idea, then abruptly moves on to the next. The result sounds more like a rough sketch than a polished final draft". Fanfare's Phillip Scott, writing about Storgårds's recordings of the First and Third symphonies, describes the former as "the most Sibelian music on this disc" and praises Madetoja for having composed "three of the 20th century's loveliest symphonies". The general impression of both reviewers seems to be that the Volmer and Storgårds recordings, "irrepressib[ly] vigor[ous]" and "passionate", respectively, are superior to the slower, "more laid-back" interpretation of Sakari.

== References and sources ==
=== Sources ===
Books

- Tawaststjerna, Erik (1997). Sibelius: Volume 3, 1914–1957. (Robert Layton, English translation). London: Faber and Faber.

CD liner notes

- Korhonen, Kimmo (2013a). Leevi Madetoja: Symphony No. 1 and 3, Okon Fuoko Suite (booklet). John Storgårds & Helsinki Philharmonic. Helsinki, Finland: Ondine. p. 4–7. ODE1211-2.
- Pulliainen, Riitta (2000b). Madetoja Orchestral Works 2: The Spirit Home of My Soul (booklet). Arvo Volmer & Oulu Symphony Orchestra. Tampere, Finland: Alba. p. 4–6. ABCD 144.
- Pulliainen, Riitta (2000c). Madetoja Orchestral Works 3: The Infinity of Fantasy (booklet). Arvo Volmer & Oulu Symphony Orchestra. Tampere, Finland: Alba. p. 4–6. ABCD 156.
- Salmenhaara, Erkki (1992b). Madetoja, L.: Symphonies Nos. 1 and 2 (booklet). Petri Sakari & Iceland Symphony Orchestra. Colchester, England: Chandos. p. 4–6. CHAN 9115.

Websites

- Korhonen, Kimmo. "Leevi Madetoja in Profile". madetoja.org/en.

Journal articles

- Godell, Tom (2001). "Madetoja: Symphony 1; Concert Overture; Pastoral Suite; Rustic Scenes". American Record Guide. 64 (2): 126–27. (subscription required)
- Scott, Phillip (2014). "Classical Recordings: Helsinki Philharmonic Orchestra - Leevi Madetoja: Symphonies Nos. 1 and 3; 'Okon Fuoko' Suite". Fanfare Magazine. 37 (6): 347–48. (subscription required)
