= Dancla Stradivarius =

Dancla Stradivarius may refer to:

- Dancla Stradivarius (1703)
- Dancla Stradivarius (1708)
- Dancla Stradivarius (1710)
