= Before we fall =

Composition by Anna S. Þorvaldsdóttir

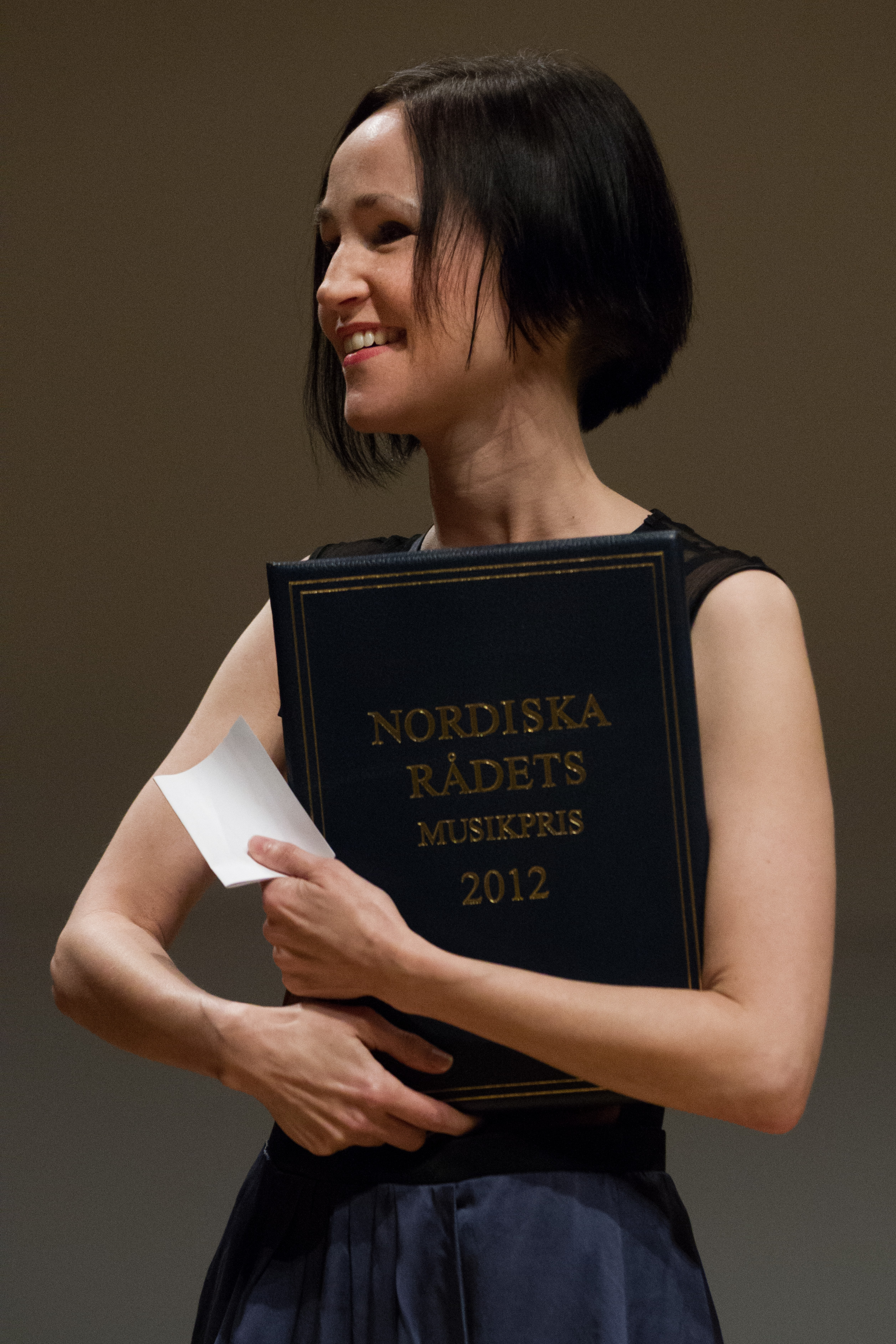
Anna S. Þorvaldsdóttir in 2012

Before we fall is a cello concerto written in 2024 by the Icelandic composer Anna S. Þorvaldsdóttir. The work was commissioned by the San Francisco Symphony, the BBC Proms, the Iceland Symphony Orchestra, the Helsinki Philharmonic Orchestra, and the Odense Symphony Orchestra. Its world premiere was performed by the cellist Johannes Moser and the San Francisco Symphony conducted by Dalia Stasevska at the Louise M. Davies Symphony Hall on May 15, 2025. The European premiere took place at the BBC Proms and was performed by Moser and the BBC Symphony Orchestra conducted by Eva Ollikainen at the Royal Albert Hall on August 13, 2025.

== Composition ==
Before we fall is cast in one continuous movement and lasts approximately 26 minutes.

=== Background ===
Before we fall is Þorvaldsdóttir's first concerto. A cellist herself, the composer grew up playing the instrument, but found her attention shifting to composition while studying at the Iceland University of the Arts. She wrote the piece with the German-Canadian cellist Johannes Moser in mind, but the two did not meet until March 2025 after the score had been completed.

=== Instrumentation ===
The work is scored for solo cello and a large orchestra comprising two flutes, alto flute, cor anglais, two clarinets, bass clarinet, two bassoons, contrabassoon, four horns, two trombones, tuba, two percussionists, and strings.

== Reception ==
Reviewing the world premiere, Lisa Hirsch of the San Francisco Chronicle praised Before we fall as "a banger, sonically and intellectually, dense with ideas and meriting repeat hearings." She added, "Yes, the cello has its virtuosic flights during the four parts and epilogue of the concerto. And German Canadian cellist Johannes Moser played throughout with both thrilling splendor and fierce intimacy. Yet these dazzling passages seem to arise from, or float over, the depths of the orchestra, negotiating with the ensemble rather than opposing it."

Reviewing the European premiere, Flora Willson of The Guardian also lauded the concerto, writing, "As with so many of Thorvaldsdottir's scores, the concerto has an elemental, immersive quality, its symphonic textures seeming at times to breath as if a living organism. Elsewhere, the orchestra was in danger of swallowing Moser's detailed passagework whole. Occasionally, the entire ensemble clicked briefly into tonal harmony – a remarkable, luminous effect."
