= Violin Concerto (Britten) =

Britten's only violin concerto

- by Benjamin Britten
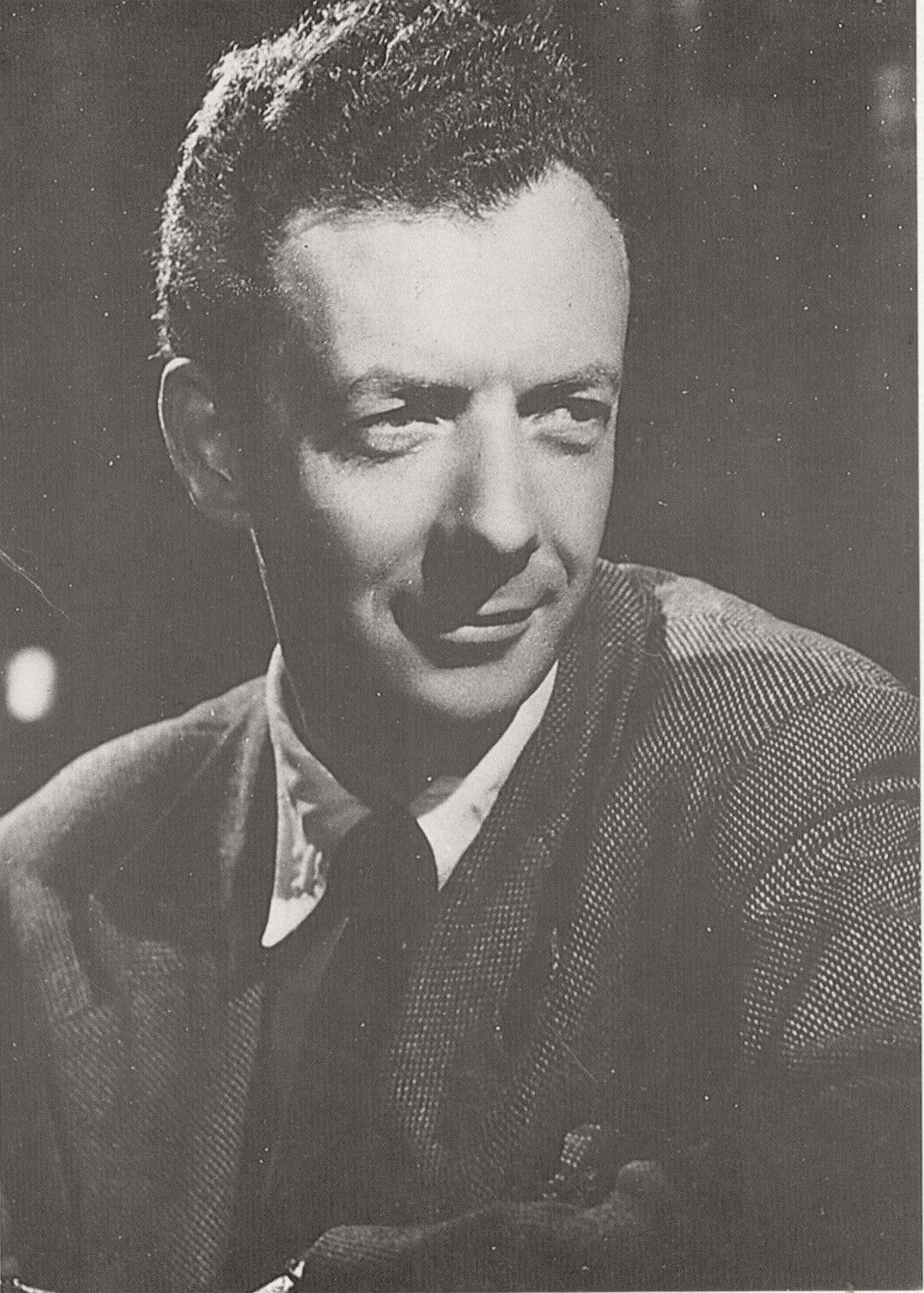
- Benjamin Britten in the 1940s
- Opus: 15
- Time: 33 min
- Composed: 1938–39, revised three times
- Dedication: Henry Boys
- Performed: 29 March 1940: New York City
- Movements: Three

Benjamin Britten's Violin Concerto, Op. 15, was written from 1938 to 1939 and dedicated to Henry Boys, his fellow pupil and close friend at the Royal College of Music. Britten worked on it while staying with Aaron Copland and completed it in Quebec.

It was premiered in New York on 29 March 1940 by the Spanish violinist Antonio Brosa with the New York Philharmonic conducted by John Barbirolli. A year after its first performance in New York, the concerto was performed for the first time in England at Queen's Hall on 6 April 1941. It was conducted by Basil Cameron, and the soloist was Thomas Matthews, leader of the London Philharmonic Orchestra. It received its first broadcast performance with the BBC Orchestra, conducted by Clarence Raybould and Thomas Matthews as soloist, on 28 April 1941.

A typical performance lasts around 33 minutes.

== Revisions ==
Britten revised the concerto in 1950, 1954, and 1965. The first revision, including alterations of the solo violin part prepared with the assistance of Manoug Parikian, was performed by Bronislav Gimpel and the Royal Philharmonic Orchestra under Thomas Beecham in 1951.

Britten wrote to Albert Goldberg in October 1950, saying:

It was written in 1939, & although it has been played quite a lot here & abroad I have never been happy about the form of it... The fact that Heifetz was going to play the work spurred me on to looking [at] it again from this point of view, & that I have just done. There is no structural change in the work – a shortening here & a rewriting there is all I've done. There is no new material at all, although a complete rewriting of a violin passage in the last movement is a new development of existing stuff. The cadenza is shortened, & a rather embarrassing chord for orchestra in the middle of it is removed. I hope what I have done is to leave the work as it would have been had I been able to write it in 1939 with my present experience. I think I bit off then a bit more than I could chew! – especially in the last movement.

== Music ==
The concerto is scored for solo violin and an orchestra of 3 flutes (2nd and 3rd doubling piccolo), 2 oboes (2nd doubling cor anglais), 2 clarinets, 2 bassoons, 4 horns, 3 trumpets, 3 trombones, tuba, percussion (timpani, glockenspiel, cymbals, triangle, bass drum, side drum, and tenor drum), harp, and strings.

The concerto is written in three movements:

1. Moderato con moto – Agitato – Tempo primo
2. Vivace – Animando – Largamente – Cadenza
3. Passacaglia: Andante lento (Un poco meno mosso)

This form, although in three movements, is highly unlike that of concertos from the Classical and Romantic eras. First used in the First Violin Concerto of Sergei Prokofiev, this design is also evident in the concertos of William Walton and later in Shostakovich's first violin concerto, that has a structure that clearly recalls Britten's concerto.

=== I. Moderato con moto – Agitato – Tempo primo ===
The work opens with a series of timpani strokes, a reminder perhaps of Beethoven's 1806 Violin Concerto. The rhythm is taken up by the bassoon and other instruments, persisting as an ostinato throughout the entire work. The violin enters with a song-like lament, soaring above the orchestra. The music is soon interrupted by a more militaristic and percussive secondary theme.

=== II. Vivace – Animando – Largamente – Cadenza ===
The ensuing second movement, cast as a wild, moto perpetuo scherzo, unmistakably recalls Prokofiev. The movement culminates in an impressive cadenza which, while recalling musical material from both the first and second movements, acts as an organic link straight into the finale.

=== III. Passacaglia: Andante lento (Un poco meno mosso) ===
As the finale, Britten uses a passacaglia: a set of variations on a ground bass, in the tradition of the Baroque chaconnes by Purcell and Bach. The ground bass, tonally unstable, is initially introduced by the trombone, as the violin recalls its lyrical theme from the first movement. Individual variations unfold, taking up characters of song, dance, capriccio and march. By the end, the ground bass is reduced to chant-like reminiscences; the orchestra leaves hints of an unmistakable D major chord, while the soloist is left undecided in a trill between the notes F-natural and G-flat.

== Discography ==
Year	Soloist	Conductor Orchestra	Format: Record label Catalogue number
1948	Theo Olof	John Barbirolli, Hallé Orchestra (World Premiere Recording 1948, Original Version)	CD: EMI (7243 5 66053 2 9); Publication date: 1997
1952	Antonio Brosa	Ian Whyte, BBC Scottish Orchestra (9 April 1952)	LP: Stereo Records & Tapes; Cat: SRT/Custom 009 (private release)
1964	Nora Grumlíková	Peter Maag, Prague Symphony Orchestra (1964)	CD: Supraphon; Cat: 1106532 (1991)
1970s	Ruggiero Ricci	G.Brott, SWF Sinfonie Orchester (live – doubtful venue, conductor and orchestra)	CD: One-Eleven; Cat: EPR-96020 (1996)
1970	Mark Lubotsky	Benjamin Britten, English Chamber Orchestra	CD: Decca; Cat: 417 308-2
1974	Rodney Friend	John Pritchard, London Philharmonic Orchestra	LP: EMI; Cat: CFP 40250
1977	Ida Haendel	Paavo Berglund, Bournemouth Symphony Orchestra	LP: EMI; Cat: ASD 3483
1981	Boris Gutnikov	Aleksandr Dmitriyev, Leningrad Academic Philharmonic Symphony Orchestra	LP: Melodiya; Cat: С10-16521-2
1990	Lorraine McAslan	Steuart Bedford, English Chamber Orchestra (Recorded Oct. 1989)	CD: Collins Classics; Cat: B0000264EZ
1996	Serguei Azizian	Osmo Vänskä, Copenhagen Philharmonic Orchestra	CD: Alto; Cat: BAX3661 (2013)
1997	Rebecca Hirsch	Takuo Yuasa, BBC Scottish Symphony Orchestra	CD: Naxos; Cat: 8.553882
2001	Lydia Mordkovitch	Richard Hickox, BBC Symphony Orchestra	CD: Chandos; Cat: CHAN 9910
2003	Maxim Vengerov	Mstislav Rostropovich, London Symphony Orchestra	CD: EMI Classics; Cat: 0724355751027
2004	Frank Peter Zimmermann	Manfred Honeck, Swedish Radio Symphony Orchestra	CD: Sony; Cat: S70316C 88697439992
2005	Daniel Hope	Paul Watkins, BBC Symphony Orchestra	CD: Warner Classics; Cat: 2564-60291-2
2009	Janine Jansen	Paavo Järvi, London Symphony Orchestra	CD: Decca; Cat: 000289 478 1530 3
2011	Wanda Wiłkomirska	Witold Rowicki, Warsaw Philharmonic Orchestra	CD: Orchestral Concert CDs; Cat: CD12/2011
2012	Anthony Marwood	Ilan Volkov, BBC Scottish Symphony Orchestra	CD: Hyperion; Cat: CDA67801
2013	James Ehnes	Kirill Karabits, Bournemouth Symphony Orchestra	CD: Onyx; Cat: BBX2835 (2012)
2013	Tasmin Little	Edward Gardner, BBC Philharmonic	CD: Chandos; Cat: CHAN10764
2014	Gil Shaham	Juanjo Mena, Boston Symphony Orchestra	CD: Canary Classics; Cat: CC12
2014	Linus Roth	Mihkel Kütson, Deutsches Symphonie-Orchester Berlin	CD/SACD: Challenge Classics; Cat: CC 72627
2016	Vilde Frang	James Gaffigan, hr-Sinfonieorchester	CD: Warner Classics; Cat: 0825646009213
2017	Arabella Steinbacher	Vladimir Jurowski, Berlin Radio Symphony Orchestra	CD/SACD: Pentatone; Cat: PTC 5186625
2022	Augustin Hadelich	Cristian Măcelaru, WDR Symphony Orchestra Cologne	CD: Warner Classics; Cat: 9029631076
2023	Kerson Leong	Patrick Hahn, Philharmonia Orchestra	CD: Alpha Classics; Cat: ALPHA946
2024	Baiba Skride	Marin Alsop, Vienna Radio Symphony Orchestra	CD: Orfeo; Cat: C220021
2024	Isabelle Faust	Jakub Hrůša, Symphonieorchester des Bayerischen Rundfunks	CD: harmonia mundi Cat: HMM 902668
