= Archora =

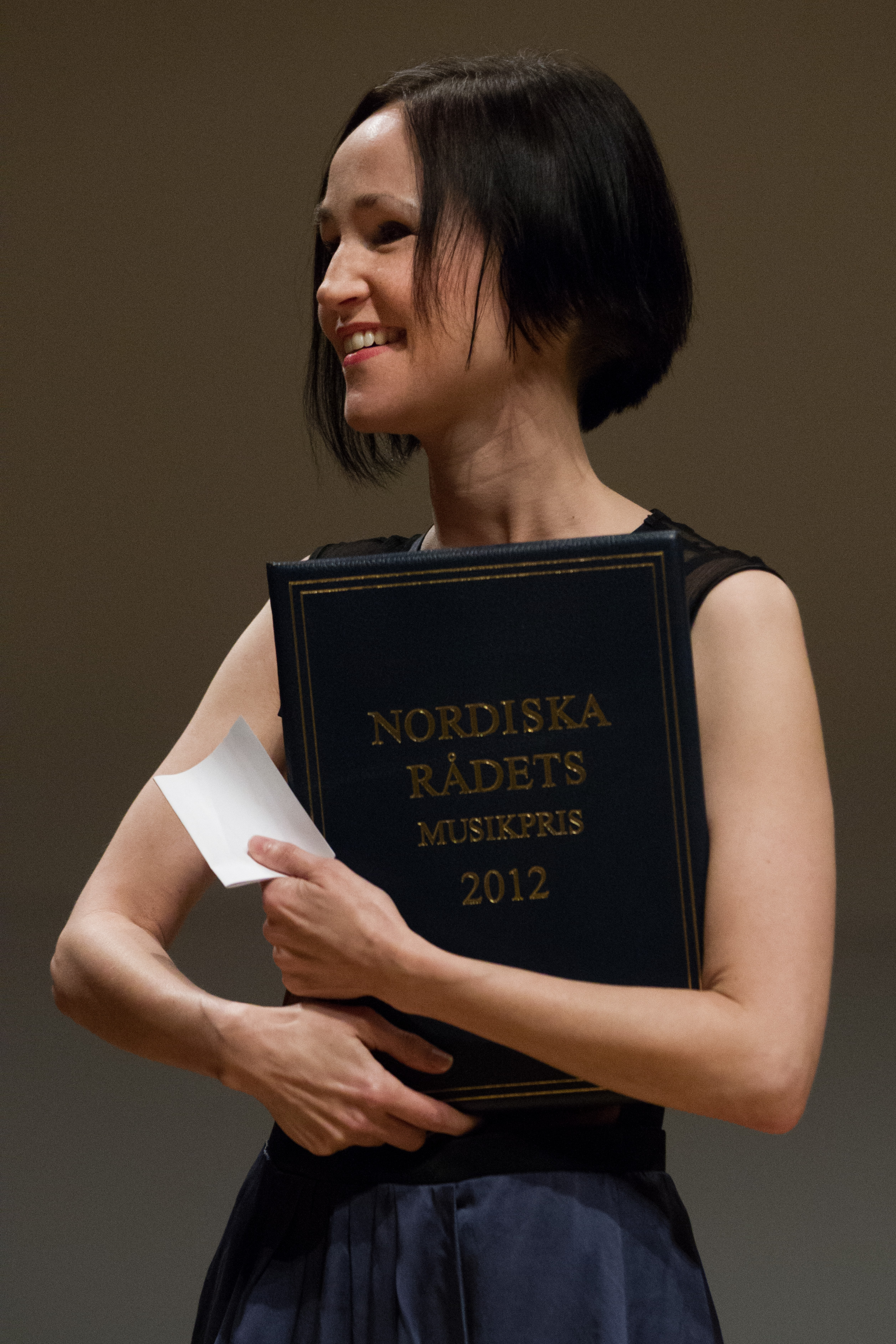
Anna S. Þorvaldsdóttir in 2012

Archora (stylized as ARCHORA) is a 2022 orchestral composition written by the Icelandic composer Anna S. Þorvaldsdóttir. It is in one movement with a duration of about 19 minutes. The work was jointly commissioned by BBC Radio 3, the Los Angeles Philharmonic, the Munich Philharmonic, the Orchestre de Paris, the Iceland Symphony Orchestra, and Klangspuren Schwaz. Its world premiere was given during the BBC Proms by the BBC Philharmonic conducted by Eva Ollikainen at Royal Albert Hall on 11 August 2022.

== Composition ==
Archora is cast in one continuous movement and has a duration of roughly 19 minutes.

=== Instrumentation ===
The work is scored for two flutes, alto flute, two clarinets, bass clarinet, two bassoons, contrabassoon, four horns, trombone, bass trombone, tuba, bass tuba, three percussionists, organ (optional) and strings.

== Reception ==
Reviewing the world premiere, Boyd Tonkin of The Arts Desk described Archora as a "primeval sonic landscape" and declared it "well worth another visit." Andrew Clements of The Guardian favorably compared the piece to the music of Jean Sibelius and described it as "another immensely impressive study in sonority" from the composer; Clements later included the piece as one of the classical music highlights of 2022. John Allison of The Daily Telegraph also praised the piece, writing:

Exploring the notion of primordial energy, ARCHORA (Thorvaldsdottir's titles frequently reflect a fondness for capital letters) opens slowly and with a low growl in the orchestra, building towards a dark mass of sound from which flecks of detail escape momentarily. Full of surprises yet satisfyingly logical, Thorvaldsdottir's brand of Nordic spectralism is summed up in this work scored for large orchestra including organ (but no trumpets), and in which melodic contours emerge as the piece lulls itself towards resolution.

Archora was nominated for an Ivor Novello Award for Best Orchestral Composition at The Ivors Classical Awards 2023.
