= Violin Concerto (Weinberg) =

Violin concerto by Mieczyslaw Weinberg

- by Mieczysław Weinberg
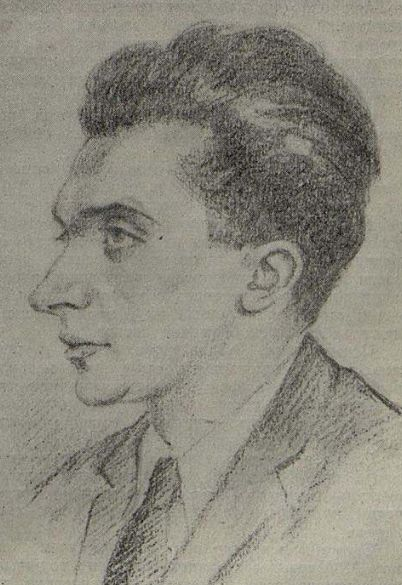
- Pencil portrait of Mieczysław Weinberg, January 1949
- Key: G minor
- Opus: 67
- Composed: 1959
- Dedication: Leonid Kogan
- Performed: 12 February 1961
- Publisher: Sikorski
- Duration: 26 min.
- Movements: 4

Mieczysław Weinberg composed his Violin Concerto in G minor, Op. 67, in 1959. The violin concerto was premiered and subsequently recorded in Moscow by soloist Leonid Kogan in 1961, but it was not until the 21st century that it was first performed in Germany, the U.S. and other countries.

== History ==
Mieczysław Weinberg composed his Violin Concerto in 1959. The concerto was premiered in Moscow on 12 February 1961, played by Leonid Kogan and the Moscow Philharmonic Orchestra, conducted by Gennady Rozhdestvensky. It was published by Sikorski in Hamburg, and dedicated to Kogan.

The German premiere was performed by Linus Roth and the Badische Staatskapelle, conducted by Mei-Ann Chen at the Badisches Staatstheater Karlsruhe on 2 November 2014. The American premiere was played by Gidon Kremer and the Naples Philharmonic conducted by Andrey Boreyko at Hayes Hall in Naples, Florida, on 9 January 2015.

== Structure and music ==
The violin concerto is structured in four movements:

1. Allegro molto
2. Allegretto
3. Adagio
4. Allegro risoluto

The duration is given as 26 minutes. The opening movement has been described as "unrelenting", reminiscent of Khachaturian’s Violin Concerto, followed by two more "exploratory" movements that use the same ideas in a calmer tone. The finale returns to a "driving momentum" but ends pianissimo.

== Recordings ==
The violin concerto was recorded by Kogan in 1961, again with the Moscow Philharmonic Orchestra, now conducted by Kirill Kondrashin. A reviewer of a 2015 reissue noted Kogan's "biting intensity allied to his immaculate technique", especially in the cadenza. In 2014 it was recorded, along with Britten's Violin Concerto, by Linus Roth and the Berlin German Symphony Orchestra, conducted by Mihkel Kütson. This recording is part of the violinist's aim to record all works by Weinberg that feature solo violin. A reviewer from Gramophone credits Roth's reading with "more subtlety and range of colour" than Kogan's. It was recorded a year later by Ilya Gringolts with the Warsaw National Philharmonic Orchestra conducted by Jacek Kaspszyk. A recording with Gidon Kremer and the Gewandhaus Orchestra conducted by Daniele Gatti was released in 2021 combined with the sonata for two violins.
