= Frøydis Ree Wekre =

Norwegian musician (born 1941)

Frøydis Ree Wekre (born 31 July 1941) is a Norwegian musician.

Born in Oslo, she studied in Oslo, Sweden, Russia, and the United States. Originally a piano and violin player, Wekre did not take up the horn until age 17, having become fascinated with its sound. Her choice for the horn was also partly inspired by her having heard that it was a particularly difficult instrument to play. After only two years of studying horn with Wilhelm Lanzky-Otto and Vitaly Bujanovsky, she was invited to join the Norwegian Opera Orchestra. She obtained a post with the Oslo Philharmonic Orchestra in 1961, where she became co-principal horn in 1965. Wekre stayed with the orchestra until her retirement in 1991.

Wekre was hired at the Norwegian Academy of Music in 1973, reached the associate professor rank in 1984 and was a professor of horn and wind chamber music from 1991. Wekre has given masterclasses and workshops throughout Europe and North America. She is an active lecturer and participates in juries at international competitions. Her book Thoughts on Playing the Horn Well has been translated into several languages. Frøydis Ree Wekre has been an honorary member of the International Horn Society since 1994, where she served as president for two years.

She is a strong advocate for free buzzing and mouthpiece buzzing, even saying you should be doing it while waiting for the bus. Though this may seem eccentric, her justification is, "If people don't know you, it doesn't matter what they think of you, and if they do know you, well, then it's not a surprise". In 2020, her Collected Writings were published.

In 2023 she was decorated as a Knight, First Class of the Order of St. Olav. She resides at Stabekk.

== Books ==
- Frøydis Ree Wekre (2005). Thoughts on Playing the Horn Well. Reistad Offset. ISBN 978-82-993244-0-3.
