= Nathanaël Iselin =

French conductor (born 1993)

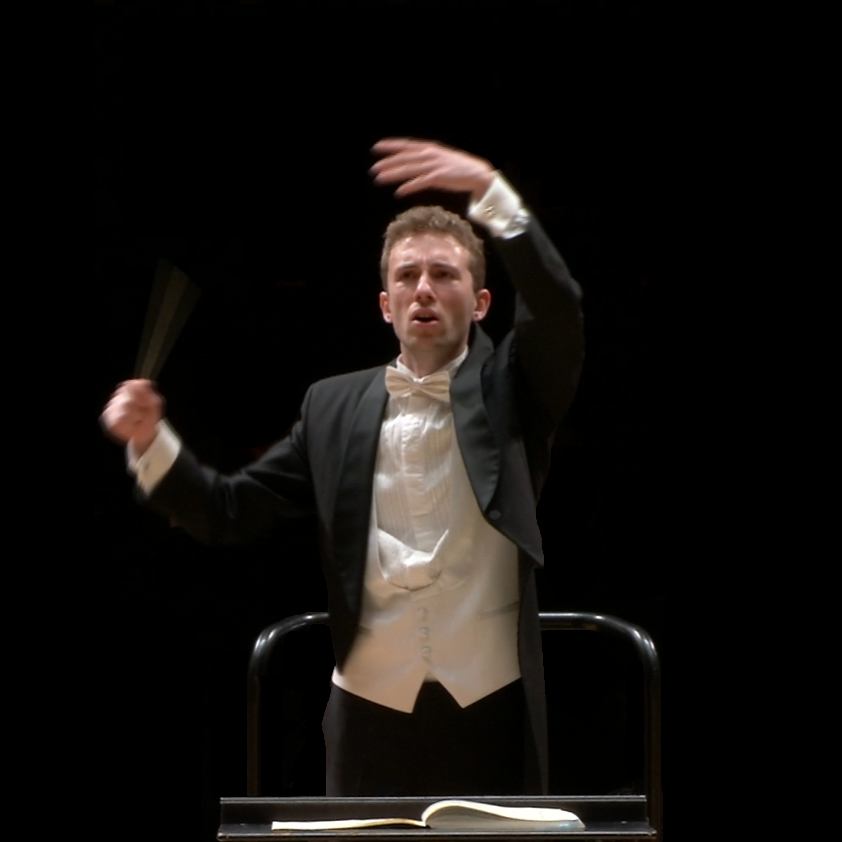
- Born: 1993 (age 32–33); Châteauroux, France
- Education: Sibelius Academy; Zurich University of the Arts; Royal Danish Academy of Music; Paris Conservatory
- Occupation: Orchestra conductor
- Organizations: Singapore Symphony Orchestra; Kymi Sinfonietta; Iceland Symphony Orchestra; Aarhus Symphony Orchestra
- Relatives: Ivan Milhiet (half-brother)
- Website: nathanael-iselin.com

Nathanaël Iselin (born 1993) is a French conductor. He is Artistic Partner of the Kymi Sinfonietta in Finland, and Associate Conductor of the Singapore Symphony Orchestra.

== Biography and career ==
=== Education ===
Nathanaël Iselin began his musical studies at the age of 6, learning piano, percussions, music theory, and later orchestra conducting, at the Limoges Conservatory. In 2014, he joined the Orchestre Français des Jeunes as a percussionist. In the following years, he studied orchestra conducting at the Conservatoire de Paris, the Royal Danish Academy of Music, the Zurich University of the Arts, and the Sibelius Academy.

Among his regular teachers were Sakari Oramo, Giordano Bellincampi, Michael Schønwandt and Johannes Schlaefli. He also followed masterclasses with Iván Fischer, Mariss Jansons, Fabio Luisi, Thomas Søndergård, Alexander Vedernikov, Simone Young and Jaap van Zweden. He served as assistant conductor to Michael Tilson Thomas, Sir Antonio Pappano, Susanna Mälkki, Vasily Petrenko, and Eva Ollikainen, among others.

=== Conducting Career ===
In 2021, Nathanaël Iselin won the First Prize and the Orchestra Prize at the 8th Jorma Panula Conducting Competition. He served for one season as assistant conductor of the Aarhus Symphony Orchestra, being the first person to hold that position in Denmark. He was later named conductor in residence of the Iceland Symphony Orchestra.

In 2023, Iselin won the Second Prize at the German Conducting Awards, and has since then conducted a number of orchestras in Europe, such as the Finnish Radio Symphony Orchestra with Thierry Escaich as a soloist, the Norwegian Radio Orchestra, with Tora Augestad as a soloist, the Copenhagen Philharmonic, the Opéra Orchestre national Montpellier, the Odense Symphony Orchestra, the Oulu Symphony Orchestra.

In 2026, Iselin was appointed Artistic Partner of the Kymi Sinfonietta, a role in which he will help shape the orchestra's artistic direction and programming while conducting several concerts each season.

Later in 2026, Iselin was also appointed Associate Conductor of the Singapore Symphony Orchestra. He will serve during the 2026/27 and 2027/28 seasons, during which he will regularly conduct performances with the SSO, as well as work with the Singapore Symphony Choruses.

Iselin also works in the field of opera, being a regular guest at Opera Hedeland, where he led productions of Mozart's Le Nozze di Figaro and Rossini's La Cenerentola. He also conducted Die Zauberflöte in Stockholm's Folkoperan, and participated in productions such as Die Soldaten with the Gürzenich Orchestra Cologne in the Elbphilharmonie Hamburg and the Philharmonie de Paris, and Smetana's Prodaná nevěsta with the Bern Theatre.

== Awards ==
- Jorma Panula Conducting Competition: 1st Prize
- Jorma Panula Conducting Competition: Orchestra Prize
- German Conducting Awards: 2nd Prize
