= Anna S. Þorvaldsdóttir =

Icelandic composer

Anna Thorvaldsdottir Anna Sigríður Þorvaldsdóttir
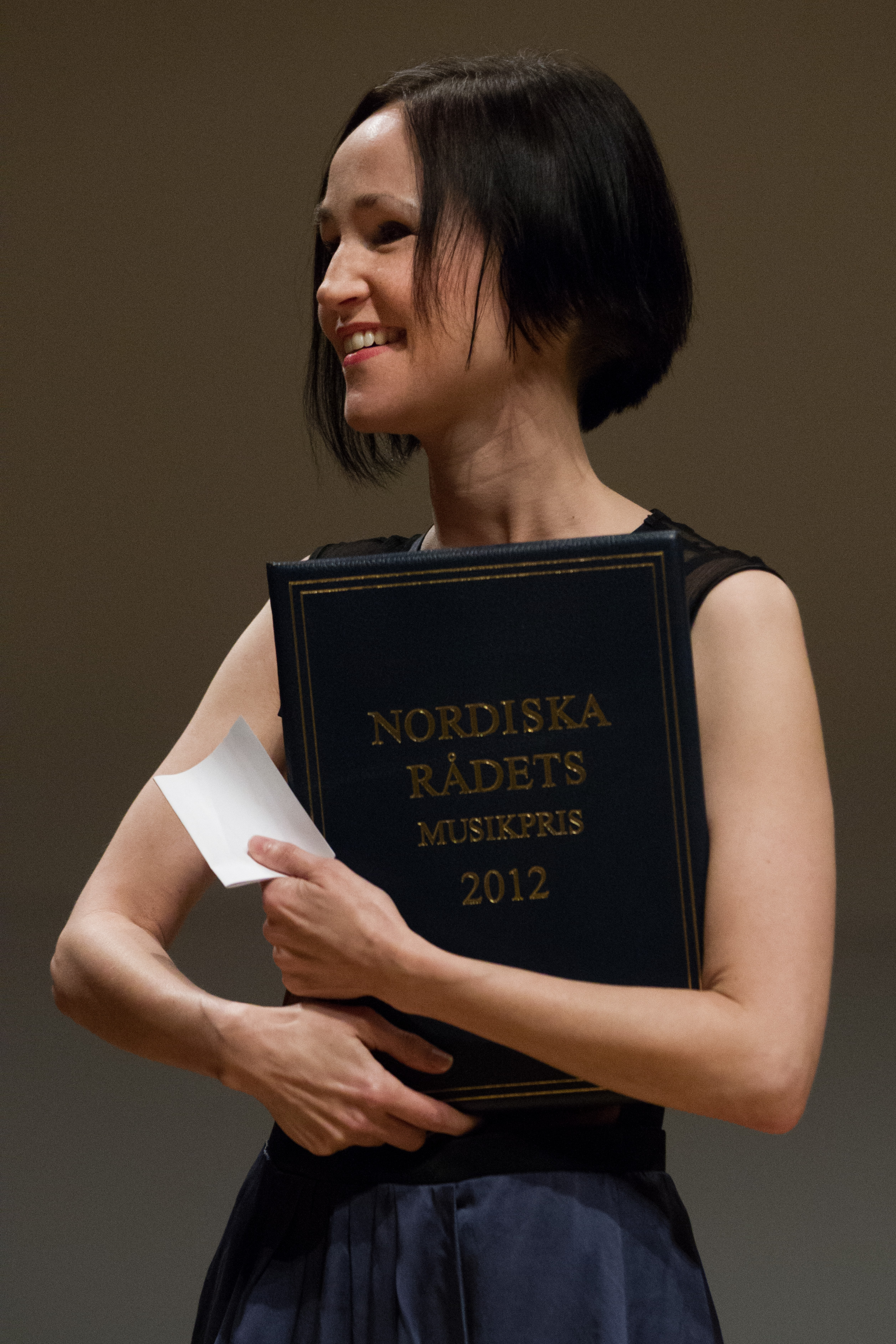
- Nordic Council Music Prize 2012

Background information
- Born: July 11, 1977 (age 49); Iceland
- Occupation: Composer

Anna Sigríður Þorvaldsdóttir (Anna Thorvaldsdottir) (born 11 July 1977) is an Icelandic composer. She has been called "one of Iceland's most celebrated composers", and has won the Nordic Council Music Prize, Ivor Novello Award, Chanel Next Prize, and other honors. Her music is frequently performed in Europe and in the United States, and is often influenced by landscapes and nature.

== Early life and education ==
Anna Thorvaldsdottir trained as a cellist in her youth, and began composing at a young age. She studied composition at the Iceland University of the Arts (BA in Composition), and later attended the University of California, San Diego, gaining her MA and PhD.

== Career ==
Anna Thorvaldsdottir has been commissioned by Berliner Philharmoniker, New York Philharmonic, Los Angeles Philharmonic, Orchestre de Paris, City of Birmingham Symphony Orchestra, Gothenburg Symphony Orchestra, Munich Philharmonic, International Contemporary Ensemble, Ensemble Intercontemporain, BBC Proms, and Carnegie Hall.

Portrait concerts of Anna's work have been presented at many major venues and music festivals, including: Chicago’s Museum of Contemporary Art, Knoxville’s Big Ears Festival, Lincoln Center’s Mostly Mozart Festival in NYC, Münchener Kammerorchester’s Nachtmusic der Moderne series, National Sawdust, the Composer Portraits Series at NYC’s Miller Theatre, the Leading International Composers series at the Phillips Collection in Washington DC, Gothenburg Symphony Orchestra’s Point Festival, and Wigmore Hall.

As an educator, she has given lectures and presentations at Stanford, Columbia, Cornell, NYU, Northwestern, University of Chicago, Sibelius Academy, and the Royal Academy of Music in London.

Anna was composer-in-residence with the Iceland Symphony Orchestra from 2018 to 2023. In 2023 she was a featured composer at the Aldeburgh Festival and at the Tanglewood Festival of Contemporary Music. In 2024-2025, she was Creative Chair at Tonhalle-Orchester Zürich, and in 2025-2026, composer-in-residence with the Helsinki Philharmonic Orchestra. For the 2026–27 season she is composer-in-residence at BOZAR (the Centre for Fine Arts, Brussels) in Belgium and with the Stavanger Symphony Orchestra in Norway.

She is based in Surrey, UK, near London.

=== Major orchestral works ===
Anna is known for her "innovative" approach to orchestral writing.

Dreaming (2008), for which Anna received the 2012 Nordic Council Music Prize, was premiered by the Iceland Symphony Orchestra and Bernharður Wilkinson on 14 January 2010. The UK premiere was given by the BBC Symphony Orchestra and Rumon Gamba on 11 January 2019.

AERIALITY (2011) was an important work for catapulting Anna's orchestral writing into the interest of American orchestras. It was commissioned by the Iceland Symphony Orchestra and premiered in November 2011. It was selected as a top 10 recording in 2014 by The New Yorker's Alex Ross, and by John Schaefer for WNYC's New Sounds Year in Review.

The New York Philharmonic's Kravis Emerging Composer Award, and the associated commission of METACOSMOS (2017), premiered on 4 April 2018 under the baton of Esa-Pekka Salonen at Lincoln Center's David Geffen Hall, cemented Anna's status as “one of the most unique and expressive voices in the compositional scene today.” The European premiere was given by the Berliner Philharmoniker under Alan Gilbert.

AIŌN (2018), co-commissioned by the Iceland Symphony Orchestra and the Gothenburg Symphony Orchestra, was given its world premiere on 24 May 2019, at the Point Music Festival in the Gothenburg Concert Hall, Gothenburg, by the Gothenburg Symphony Orchestra conducted by Anna-Maria Helsing. It received its US premiere at Spoleto Festival USA in 2022, conducted by John Kennedy.

CATAMORPHOSIS (2020) was premiered by the Berlin Philharmonic and Kirill Petrenko on 29 January 2021. The work was a Berlin Philharmonic commission (co-commissioned by New York Philharmonic, City of Birmingham Symphony Orchestra, and Iceland Symphony Orchestra). CATAMORPHOSIS also received the UK's Ivors Composer Award for Large Scale Composition in 2021. The UK premiere was given by the CBSO and Ludovic Morlot.

ARCHORA (2022) was commissioned by the BBC Proms (co-commissioned by the Los Angeles Philharmonic, Munich Philharmonic, Orchestre de Paris, Klangspuren Schwaz, and Iceland Symphony Orchestra). The work was premiered by the BBC Philharmonic under Eva Ollikainen on 11 August 2022 at Royal Albert Hall.

METAXIS (2024), her seventh orchestral score, had its world premiere at the Reykjavík Arts Festival on June 1, 2024 with the Icelandic Symphony Orchestra conducted by Eva Ollikainen.

The cello concerto Before we fall (2024), Þorvaldsdóttir's first concerto, was commissioned by San Francisco Symphony, Iceland Symphony Orchestra, Helsinki Philharmonic Orchestra, Odense Symphony Orchestra and BBC Radio 3 and written for cellist Johannes Moser. Moser and the San Francisco Symphony conducted by Dalia Stasevska gave the world premiere on May 15, 2025. Anna won the Ivor Novello Award for Best Large-Scale Composition for this work in 2026.

== Awards and honours ==
- In 2026, her cello concerto Before we fall was awarded the Ivor Novello Award for Best Large-Scale Composition.
- In 2024, Anna was awarded the Chanel Next Prize.
- CATAMORPHOSIS received the UK's Ivors Composer Award for Large Scale Composition in 2021.
- Anna received the Lincoln Center’s Emerging Artist Award and Martin E. Segal Award, 2018.
- In 2015, she was chosen as the New York Philharmonic's Kravis Emerging Composer, an honor that includes a $50,000 cash prize and a commission to write a composition for the orchestra; she is the second recipient. The orchestra later performed the premiere of her symphonic poem Metacosmos under the conductor Esa-Pekka Salonen in April 2018.
- Anna Thorvaldsdottir was awarded the 2012 Nordic Council Music Prize for her orchestral work Dreaming, one of the pieces on her album Rhízōma which was released on 25 October 2011 on Innova Recordings.

In the movie Tár (2022), Cate Blanchett as Lydia Tár advises a student who is conducting Ró.

== Selected works ==
=== Orchestral ===
- Before we fall (2024), cello concerto
- METAXIS (2023)
- ARCHORA (2022)
- CATAMORPHOSIS (2020)
- AIŌN (2018)
- METACOSMOS (2017)
- AERIALITY (2011)
- Dreaming (2008)

=== Chamber ===
- Enigma (2019), for string quartet
- Spectra (2017), for violin, viola, and cello
- Illumine (2016), for string octet
- Aequilibria (2014), for large ensemble
- In the Light of Air (2014), for percussion, harp, piano, viola, cello, harp, and electronics
- Ró (2013), for bass flute, bass clarinet, percussion, piano, two violins, viola, cello
- aura (2011), for percussion trio
- Hrím (2010), for large ensemble

=== Choral ===
- Ad Genua (2016), for choir and string quintet
- Heyr þú oss himnum á (2005, arrangement of 16th-century Icelandic song)
- Heyr mig mín sál (2003)

== Selected recordings ==
- Aerial (Sono Luminus, 2022) [Originally released on Deutsche Grammophon in 2014]
- ENIGMA (Sono Luminus, 2021)
- Rhizoma (Sono Luminus, 2020) [Originally released on Innova in 2011]
- AEQUA (Sono Luminus, 2018)
- In the Light of Air (Sono Luminus, 2015)
