= Aiōn =

- by Anna S. Þorvaldsdóttir
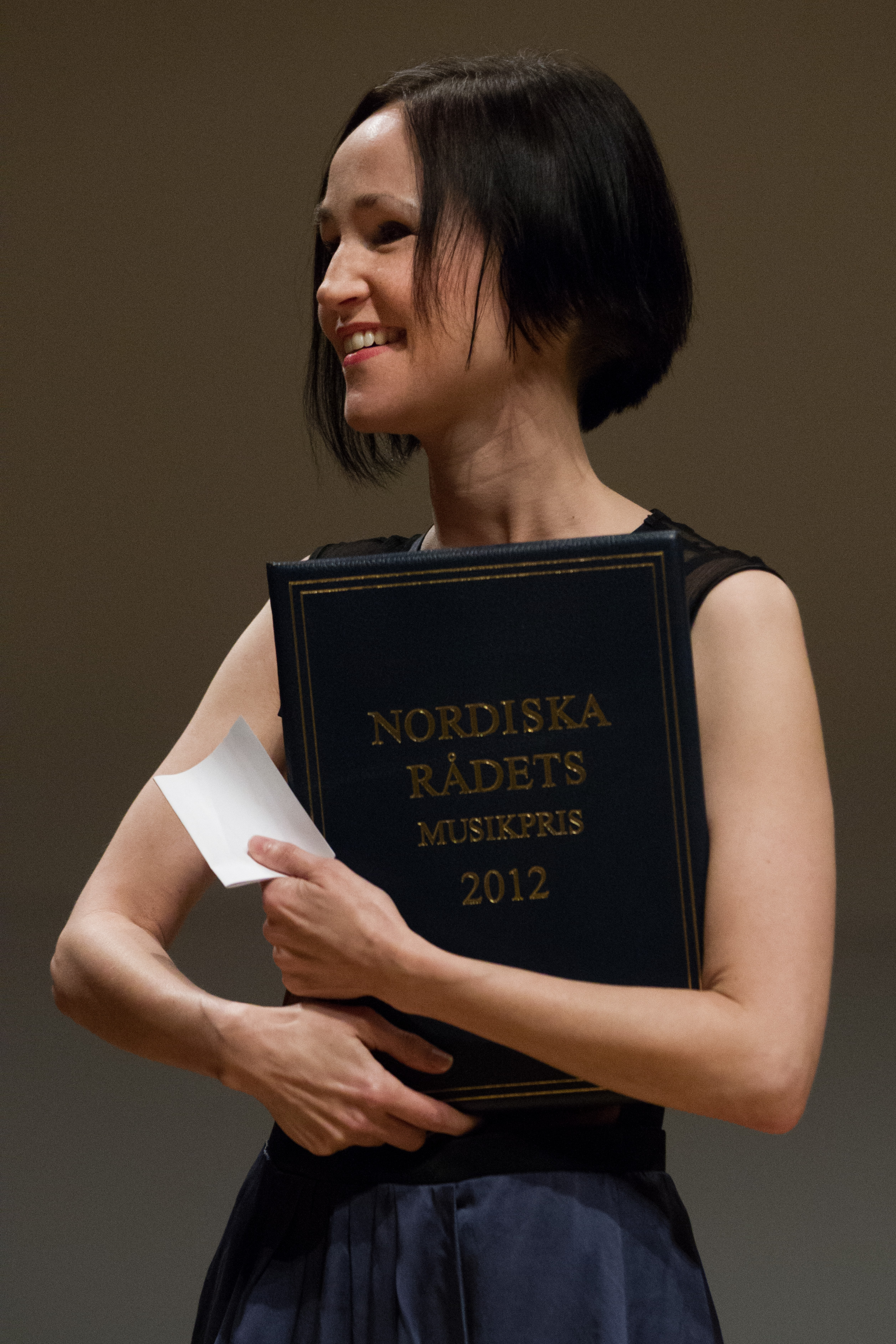
- Þorvaldsdóttir in 2012
- Genre: Orchestral
- Composed: Gothenburg Symphony Orchestra and Iceland Symphony Orchestra
- Performed: May 24, 2019 at Gothenburg Concert Hall, Gothenburg
- Movements: 3

Aiōn (stylized as AIŌN) is a composition for orchestra by the Icelandic composer Anna S. Þorvaldsdóttir. The work was commissioned by the Gothenburg Symphony Orchestra and Iceland Symphony Orchestra. It was first performed on May 24, 2019, at the Point Music Festival in the Gothenburg Concert Hall, Gothenburg, by the Gothenburg Symphony Orchestra conducted by Anna-Maria Helsing. The world premiere also featured dance accompaniment performed by the Iceland Dance Company with choreography by Erna Ómarsdóttir and video projections created by Pierre-Alain Giraud and Valdimar Jóhannsson.

== Composition ==
Aiōn is a large orchestral work which the composer conceived with optional choreographic accompaniment. In the score program note, she wrote, "Aiōn is inspired by the abstract metaphor of being able to move freely in time, of being able to explore time as a place/space that you inhabit rather than experiencing it as a one-directional journey through a single dimension. Disorienting at first, you realize that time extends in all directions simultaneously and that whenever you feel like it, you can access any moment, even simultaneously. As you learn to control the journey, you find that the experience becomes different by taking different perspectives - you can see every moment at once, focus on just some of them, or go there to experience them. You are constantly zooming in and out, both in dimension and perspective. Some moments you want to visit more than others, noticing as you revisit the same moment, how your perception of it changes."

The piece has duration of approximately 37 minutes and is cast in three movements:

1. Morphosis
2. Transcension
3. Entropia

=== Instrumentation ===
The work is scored for an orchestra consisting of two flutes, alto flute, two clarinets, bass clarinet, two bassoons, contrabassoon, four horns, two trombones, tuba, three percussionists, and strings.

== Reception ==
Reviewing the world premiere, David Nice of The Arts Desk described Aiōn as "electrifying" and wrote, "Erna Ómarsdóttir's choreography for this mythological meditation on time and space – if there was a narrative, we weren't made aware of it – contained the wildest of physical gestures, screaming and shouting within rigorous limits and astonishing symmetrical groupings, dancers going to the edge of the physically possible. As Thorvaldsdóttir's trademark becomings and spacious soundscapes are more about atmosphere than Rite of Spring-like rhythmic intensity, there was a disjunct between the dancing and playing; if anything the stunning video work projected on the birchwood walls of the concert hall, all rocks and water, related more obviously to the music. But the components all stunned."
