= Jorma Panula Conducting Competition =

The Jorma Panula Conducting Competition, is a music competition for young European conductors held in Vaasa, Finland.

== History ==
The first competition, named after the conductor and conducting professor Jorma Panula, was organized in 1999 with the idea of being a platform for young conductors starting their professional careers. The president of the Jury is Jorma Panula and the jury includes several musicians such as Olari Elts, Karsten Witt and Atso Almila. During the competition the contestants conduct the Sinfonia Finlandia and the Vaasa City Orchestra.

== Winners ==
	1st Prize	2nd Prize	3rd Prize
2024	/	Félix Benati	Eric Staiger; Kasmir Uusitupa
2021	Nathanaël Iselin; Jascha Von der Goltz; Henri Christofer Aavik	/	/
2018	/	Angus Webster; Johannes Zahn	Ross Jamie Collins; Kaapo Ijas
2015	Dylan Corlay	Elena Schwarz	Harish Shankar
2012	/	Risto Joost; Tobias Volkmann	/
2009	Yordan Kamdzhalov	Martins Ozolins	Adriel Donghyuk Kim
2006	Vytautas Lukočius	Sylvain Gasançon	Petri Komulainen
2003	Eva Ollikainen	Lilyan Kaiv	Jukka Iisakkila
1999	Olari Elts	Tibor Bogányi	Dima Slobodeniouk
