= Catamorphosis =

Orchestral composition by Anna S. Þorvaldsdóttir

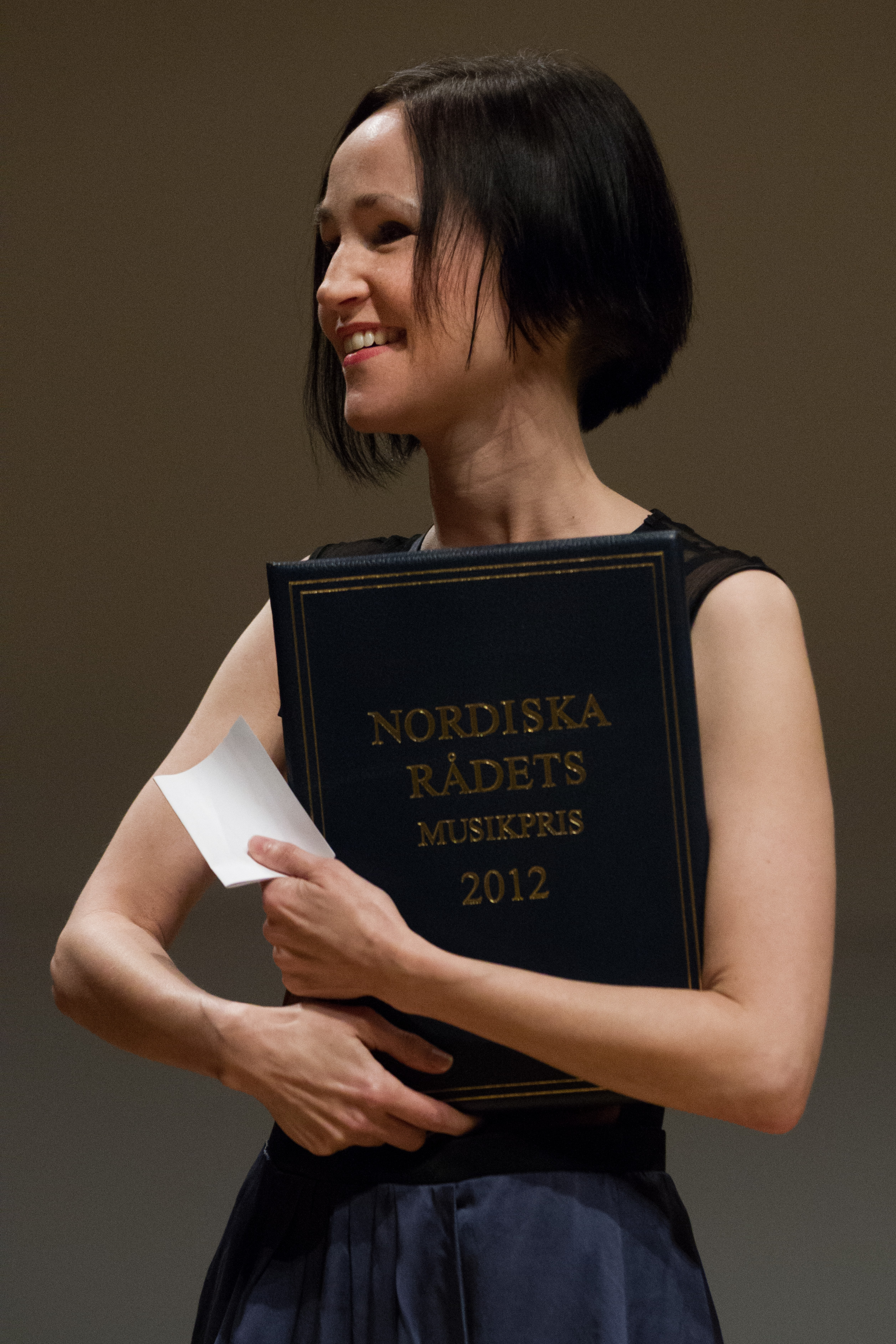
Anna S. Þorvaldsdóttir in 2012

Catamorphosis is an orchestral composition written by the Icelandic composer Anna S. Þorvaldsdóttir. The work was co-commissioned by the Stiftung Berliner Philharmoniker, the New York Philharmonic, the City of Birmingham Symphony Orchestra, and the Iceland Symphony Orchestra. It was first performed by the Berlin Philharmonic conducted by Kirill Petrenko at the Berliner Philharmonie on January 27, 2021.

== Composition ==
Catamorphosis has a duration of approximately 20 minutes and is cast in a single movement divided into 7 sections played continuously:

1. Origin
2. Emergence
3. Polarity
4. Hope
5. Requiem
6. Potentia
7. Evaporation

=== Instrumentation ===
The work is scored for a large orchestra consisting of two flutes, alto flute, two oboes, cor anglais, two clarinets, bass clarinet, two bassoons, contrabassoon, four horns, two trombones, bass trombone, tuba, bass tuba, four percussionists, harp, piano, and strings.

== Reception ==
Reviewing the world premiere of Catamorphosis, Andrew Clements of The Guardian wrote, "Lasting around 20 minutes, it's a single movement of restrained power, a continuum of shifting, colliding layers of sound, which are minutely detailed in the score yet manage to seem simultaneously massive and delicate as they move from dense chromaticism to moments of almost lucid tonality. The unswerving trajectory of the music sometimes recalls the single-mindedness of Sibelius's tone poem Tapiola, and there are also moments in Catamorphosis when the use of long bass pedals to underpin the textures, and sometimes to provide the starting point for consoling melodic lines that never quite take off, suggest even closer Sibelian connections. But this scrupulously prepared and wonderfully performed premiere showed that it's a piece that stands entirely on its own feet, creating an utterly convincing musical world."

Catamorphosis won the Ivor Novello Award for Large Scale Composition at The Ivors Composer Awards on 8 December 2021.
