= Joonatan Jürgenson =

Estonian classical pianist

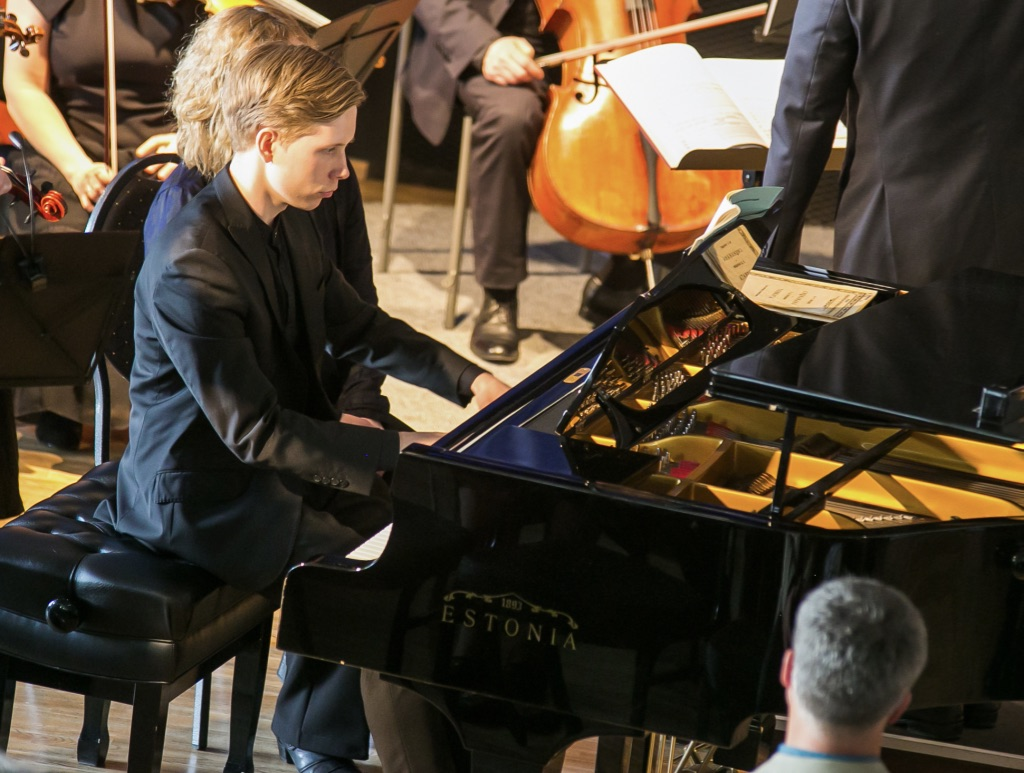

Background information
- Born: October 24, 1991 (age 34); Tartu, Estonia
- Genre: Classical
- Instrument: Piano
- Years active: 2004–present
- Label: JJ
- Website: www.joonatanjurgenson.com

Joonatan Jürgenson (born 24 October 1991 in Tartu) is an Estonian classical pianist from Tõravere. He made his debut at the age of 12 after receiving the 1st prize at the "Young Musician" competition in Tallinn, 2004.

== Education ==
Jürgenson's first contact with the music world was through singing in the kindergarten, as he successfully took part in local singing competitions. He continued to sing through the first years of school in an ensemble led by Kaie Tohver in Nõo Gymnasium. Jürgenson started his piano studies at the age of 7 in Nõo Music School with Katrin Mägi. He soon continued his studies in Heino Eller Tartu Music College, where his teacher was the headmaster of the school Kadri Leivategija. In 2016, Jürgenson received his master's degree cum laude from the Estonian Academy of Music and Theatre, where he studied with professor Ivari Ilja. In 2014–2015, he completed his studies in London at the Guildhall School of Music and Drama with the professor Ronan O'Hora.

== Career ==
As a solo pianist and an active chamber musician, Joonatan Jürgenson has successfully taken part in many national and international competitions as well as festivals from an early age. His debut was in 2004, after he received the 1st prize and special prizes for eminent style and Bach's interpretation in an international competition "Young Musician" held in Tallinn, Estonia. The same year he performed at the opening concert of the festival "Helimaastikud. Jaapan" ("Soundscapes. Japan") performing Risto Laur's "Tüdruk ja draakon" ("The Girl and the Dragon") at the age of 12 with the Sinfonietta of Heino Eller Tartu Music College under the baton of Lilyan Kaiv. In 2010 he was given Ago Russak's scholarship for excellent results as a young music student. He has also collaborated with the Grammy award-winning composer and conductor Eric Whitacre during his author concert in St John's Church in Tallinn in 2013. In San Sebastian International Piano Competition in 2013, he received the 2nd prize and the special prize for the best interpretation of the modern basque composer. In addition to concerts in Estonia, he has also performed in Latvia, Lithuania, Finland, Poland, Italy, Spain, Portugal, UK, USA and Armenia. He has collaborated with many orchestras and conductors such as Estonian Academy of Music and Theater Symphony Orchestra, Heino Eller's Music School Sinfonietta, Pärnu City Orchestra, Terre del Nord Festival Orchestra and the West Islands' Chamber Orchestra with the conductors Paul Mägi, Mihhail Gerts, Edoardo Narbona, Lilyan Kaiv and Toomas Vavilov. Terre del Nord Festival in Turin, Italy, featured Jürgenson as an opening performer, where he played a solo recital with northern music in programme. He was also invited back for the next edition in 2016, but that time for the final concert, where he played with the Terre del Nord Festival Orchestra music by Lars-Erik Larsson. In addition to solo career he also teaches masterclasses to young Estonian pianists.

== Discography ==
Prana – Young Baltic Composers' Piano Music was released digitally on 19 May and physically on 1 June 2023. It features music from Estonian, Latvian and Lithuanian composers Katrin Aller, Marina Vidmonte, Edgars Mākens, Jonas Jurkūnas, Mariliis Valkonen, Rūta Vitkauskaitė, Edgars Raginskis, Pärt Uusberg, Maria Kõrvits, Riho Esko Maimets, Leila Röömel and Rasmus Puur.

Prana – Young Baltic Composers' Piano Music (Live)

- Released: 19 May 2023
- Label: JJ
- Producer: Joonatan Jürgenson

Félix Ibarrondo's Prélude was released in March 2022 by Joonatan Jürgenson as a single. The release is available digitally.

Félix Ibarrondo – Prélude (Live)

- Released: March 2022
- Label: JJ
- Producer: Joonatan Jürgenson

In October 2021, he released a new album with Estonian chamber music for the saxophone and the piano with the Estonian saxophonist Rene Laur. The album features a commissioned piece by the Estonian-American composer Jonas Feliks Tarm. Additionally there are saxophone and piano sonatas by Estonian composers Eduard Tubin and Hillar Kareva. It premiered on 22 October.

Tubin, Kareva, Tarm: Pictures of Childhood – Joonatan Jürgenson (piano), Rene Laur (saxophone)

- Released: October 2021
- Label: JJ
- Producer: Joonatan Jürgenson

In March 2020, Jürgenson released a debut solo album. The music on the album is composed by Robert Schumann and Pyotr Tchaikovsky who were both inspired by the Romantic author E.T.A. Hoffmann.

Schumann: Fantasy Pieces Op. 12, Tchaikovsky: The Nutcracker Suite Op. 71a

- Released: March 2020
- Label: JJ
- Producer: Joonatan Jürgenson

== Chamber music ==
As well as a solo pianist, Jürgenson is also an active chamber musician. He is a part of a piano trio Trio Fantastico, which consists of Mari-Liis Urb (violin), Kristian Plink (violoncello) and Jürgenson (piano). In the 8th International Music Festival in Gyumri, Armenia, in 2016, the trio won the Grand Prix. The ensemble has also given concerts in Poland Wilanów Palace in 2016, participated in the Le Strade d'Europa Music Festival in Italy in Rome, L'Aquila and Nepi and gave three concerts in the Harmos Festival in Porto, Portugal in 2018.

Also he is collaborating with saxophonist Rene Laur with whom he has performed in many festivals (Eduard Tamme nim. Võru Puhkpillifestival; Mürtsub pill; Festival TubIN) and given out a chamber music album (Pildid lapsepõlvest). In 2015, they received first prize in International Competition of Student and Schoolchildren's Chamber Ensembles and Accompanists in Klaipeda, Lithuania and the Grand Prix in 2016 edition of festival-competition "Renaissance" in Gyumri, Armenia. In 2022, they performed Eduard Tubin's music in Festival TubIN in Tartu, Estonia. In 2024 edition of Festival TubIN Joonatan performed with Karmen Puis, Indrek Leivategjia, Karl Jõgi and Katrin Aller Eduard Oja's Music. 2025 edition of Wye Valley Chamber Music Festival featured Quattuor Artium (Merily Leotoots, Aleksandra Lipke, Anna Ryland-Jones, Joonatan Jürgenson) in two concerts.

== Unions ==
Jürgenson is a member of the Association of Estonian Professional Musicians and Estonian Piano Teachers' Union.

== Personal ==
Jürgenson is the son of Estonian politician Kalle Jürgenson and philologist Heli Jürgenson and he has three brothers: journalist Kristjan Pruul, football player Markus Jürgenson and biologist Martin Jürgenson.
