= Dancla Stradivarius (1708) =

1708 Stradivarius violin

Dancla violin by Stradivari or Dancla, Milstein is a 1708 Stradivarius violin which is referred to as the "Dancla". It was made by Italian luthier Antonio Stradivari of Cremona and named after the French violinist Charles Dancla.

== History ==
The violin was made by the instrument maker Antonio Stradivari in 1708 and it still has its original maker's label. There are two other Stradivarius violins which share the name "Dancla", the Dancla Stradivarius (1703) and the Dancla Stradivarius (1710). The violin was constructed during what is considered Antonio Stradivari's "Golden period"

== Description ==
The violin's dimensions are: Length of back 36 cm (14 in), upper bout 17 cm (6.7 in), middle bout 11.5 cm (4.5 in), and lower bouts 21 cm (8.3 in). It has a one pice back and it is orange-brown in color. The back is maple with horizontal flames which have depth. In 1913 the violin was examined by the luthiers of Caressa & Français in Paris France. They wrote a letter to Arthur Spitzer describing the violin as, "fully authentic, totally guaranteed and in a remarkable state of conservation". with this violin Stradivari experimented with proportions of the violin, the string lengths and rib heights resulted in a longer back and fuller curves, both in the front and back plates.

== Provenance ==
in 1854 Mr. Defrance from Saint-Étienne, France, purchased the violin in Paris from French luthier Jean-Baptiste Vuillaume. In 1870 it was reportedly owned by Charles-Nicolas-Eugène Gand. In 1882 it was purchased by Professor of violin at the Paris Conservatoire, Charles Dancla. The violin was the third Stradivarius that Dancla owned. In 1903 Dancla sold the violin to Albert Caressa; from there it went to Édouard Nadaud. In 1912, it was sold to Colonel Maitre of Sedan, Ardennes. In 1913 the violin was owned by Arthur Spitzer.

== See also ==
- List of Stradivarius instruments
