= Metacosmos =

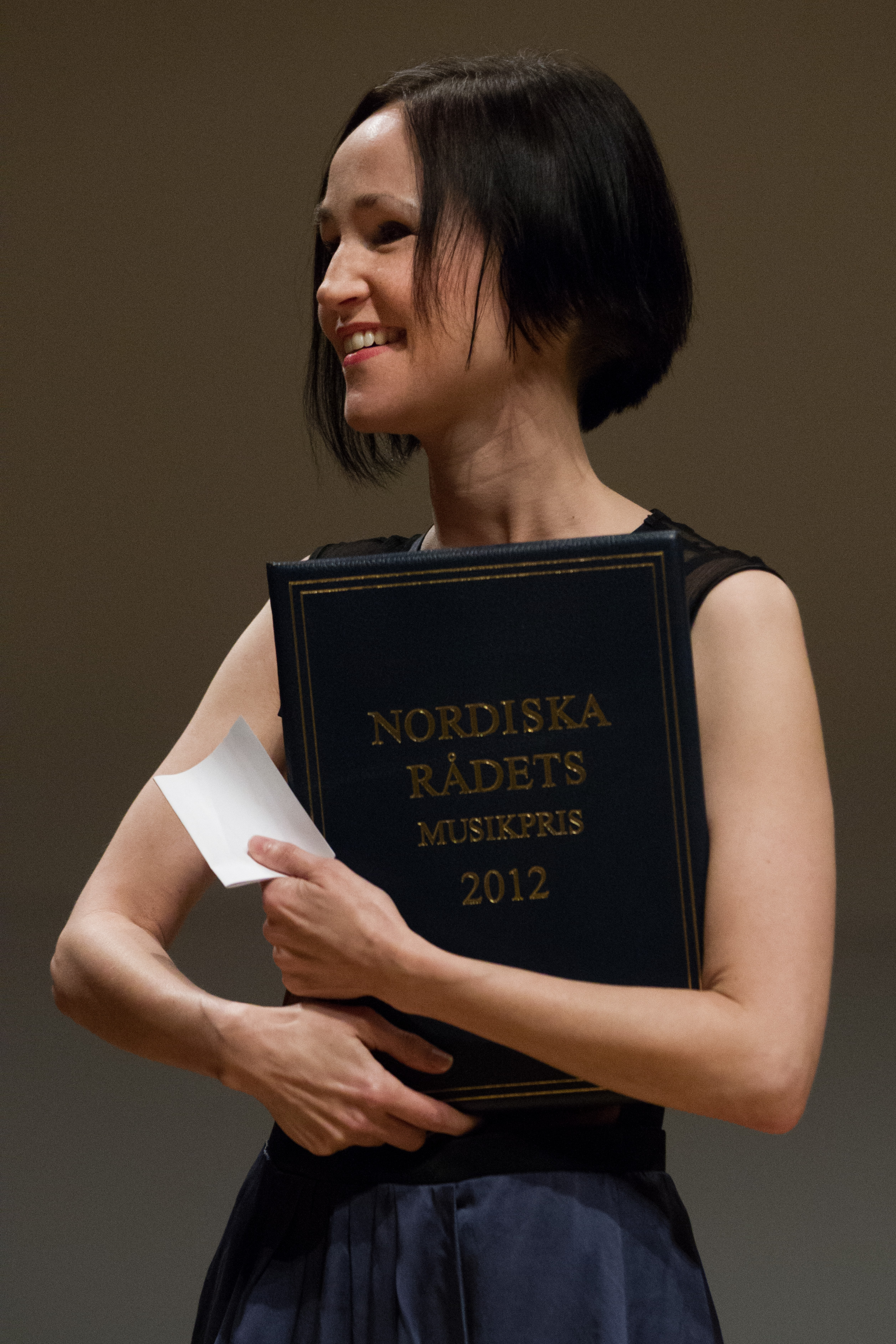
Anna S. Þorvaldsdóttir in 2012

Metacosmos is a symphonic poem by the Icelandic composer Anna S. Þorvaldsdóttir. The work was commissioned by the New York Philharmonic with support from the Marie-Josée Kravis Prize for New Music. It was first performed by the New York Philharmonic under the conductor Esa-Pekka Salonen on April 4, 2018.

== Composition ==
Metacosmos is cast in a single movement and has a duration of approximately 14 minutes. In a pre-premiere interview, the composer addressed the work's ambiguous title, remarking, "The title refers to this thought of falling into a black hole, going beyond to this other side and arriving somewhere that you did not know and had no control over."

The work is scored for a large orchestra consisting of two flutes, piccolo, alto flute, two oboes, cor anglais, three clarinets, bass clarinet, four bassoons, contrabassoon, four horns, two trumpets, two trombones, two tubas, three percussionists, and strings.

== Reception ==
Reviewing the world premiere, Anthony Tommasini of The New York Times wrote, "The title Metacosmos is meant to evoke a 'place beyond,' Ms. Thorvaldsdottir said from the stage. The music takes us on a journey to this realm, where we are drawn by a force beyond our control, amid a power struggle 'between chaos and beauty.' That description suggested amorphous music. But I was captivated by the intricacy of the sounds and colors. Ms. Thorvaldsdottir did indeed take us on a dark journey, episodic yet clear." David Wright of the New York Classical Review also praised the piece, observing, "Metacosmos made a powerful impression in its debut performance, evoking an enormous vista of space and time in a 12-minute span with broad, artfully blended strokes of orchestral color."
