= Charles Dancla =

French violinist, composer and teacher (1817–1907)

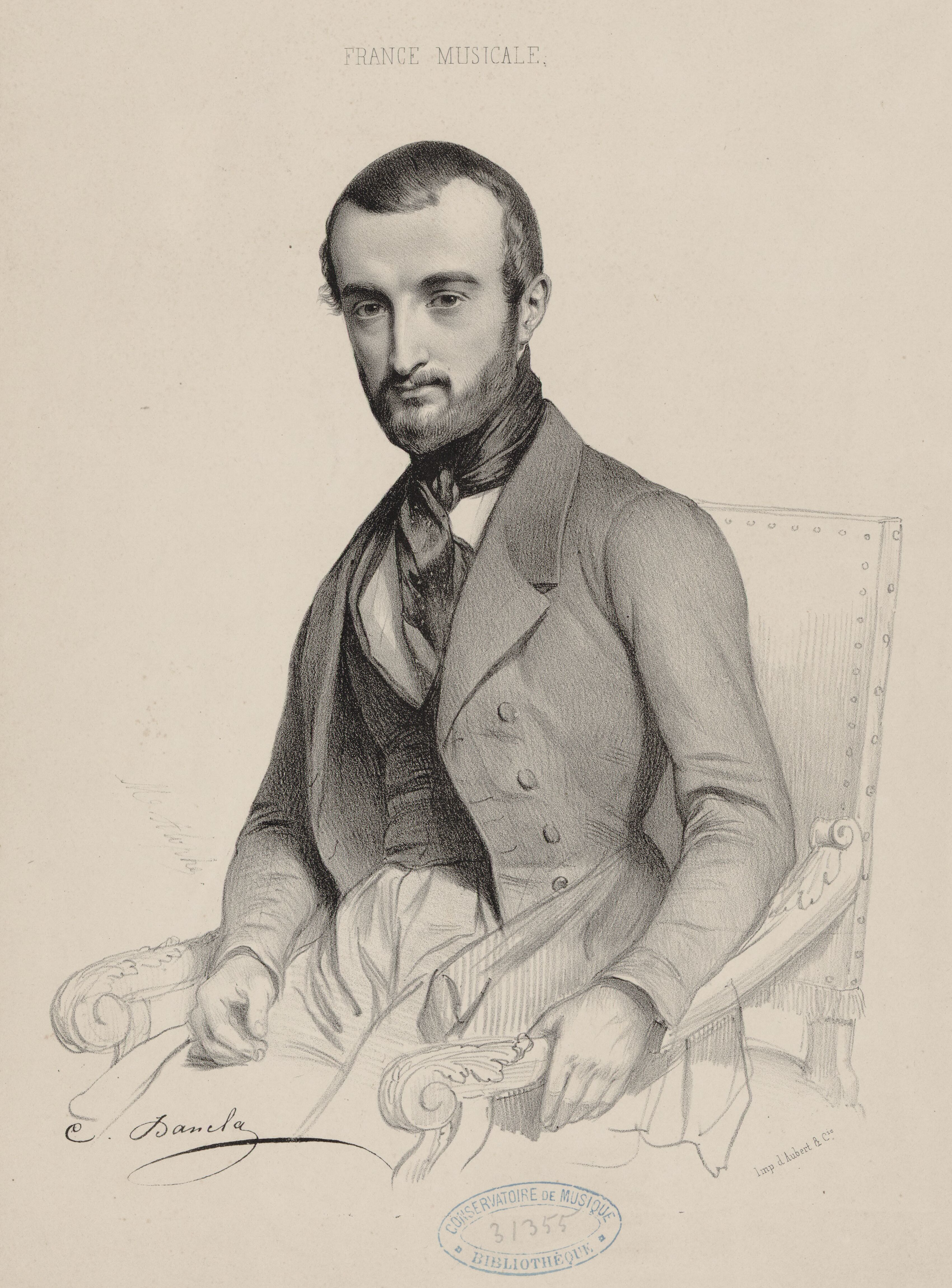
- Charles Dancla

Background information
- Born: Jean Baptiste Charles Dancla; 19 December 1817; Bagnères-de-Bigorre, Hautes-Pyrénées, France
- Died: 10 November 1907 (aged 89)
- Genres: Classical music, Romantic music
- Occupations: violinist, composer and teacher
- Instrument: violin

(Jean Baptiste) Charles Dancla (French pronunciation: [ʒɑ̃ batist ʃaʁl dɑ̃kla]; 19 December 1817 – 10 November 1907) was a French violinist, composer and teacher.

== Biography ==
Dancla was born in Bagnères-de-Bigorre. When he was nine years old, violinist Pierre Rode in Bordeaux heard his music; he was so impressed that he sent a recommendation letter to Pierre Baillot, Luigi Cherubini and Rodolphe Kreutzer. Thus, Dancla went to the Paris Conservatory and studied with Baillot for violin and Fromental Halévy for composition. He was strongly influenced by Niccolò Paganini, whom he heard in 1830, as well as by Henri Vieuxtemps. From 1835 onward, Dancla was solo violinist in the Paris Opéra, and shortly thereafter, he became concert master. In 1857, he was made a professor at the Paris Conservatory, where he was a successful teacher for over 35 years, being awarded the Prix Chartier in 1861. He died in Tunis.

His two brothers were Arnaud Dancla (1819–1862), cellist and author of a considerable cello teaching method, and Leopold Dancla (1822–1895), violinist and composer of chamber music.

== Works ==
- violin concertos
- string quartets
- string trios
- violin duos
- Airs variés, Op. 89 for violin (each of the six airs are based on themes by different composers: Pacini, Rossini, Bellini, Donizetti, Weigl and Mercadante).
- Airs variés, Op. 118 for violin (on themes from Montecchi e I Capuletti; La Straniera, Norma, La Sonnambula, Les Puritains, Le Carnaval de Venise).
- 20 études brillantes et caractéristiques

== See also ==
- Dancla Stradivarius (1703)
- Dancla Stradivarius (1708)
- Dancla Stradivarius (1710)
