= Akiko Suwanai =

Japanese violinist (born 1972)

Akiko Suwanai 諏訪内 晶子
- Born: February 7, 1972 (age 54)
- Origin: Tokyo, Japan
- Genres: Classical
- Occupation: Violinist
- Instrument: Violin
- Years active: 1990 – Present
- Label: Decca Records
- Website: akiko-suwanai

Akiko Suwanai (諏訪内 晶子, Suwanai Akiko; born February 7, 1972) is a Japanese classical violinist.

At the age of 18, she became the youngest winner of the International Tchaikovsky Competition in 1990. In addition, she was awarded second prize in the Paganini Competition in 1988 and Queen Elisabeth Competition in 1989 and is a laureate of the Music Competition of Japan.

She has studied with Toshiya Eto at the Toho Gakuen School of Music, with Dorothy DeLay and Cho-Liang Lin at the Juilliard School of Music while at Columbia University, and with Uwe-Martin Haiberg at the Universität der Künste Berlin.

Until 2019 she played the 1714 Dolphin Stradivarius, on loan from the Nippon Music Foundation. After it was returned she received the "Charles Reade" Guarneri del Gesù on loan from Japanese collector Ryuji Ueno.

== Early life and career ==
Suwanai was born in Tokyo, Japan. At the age of 2 and a half, she showed an interest in sound, so her parents took her to a nearby violin class, where she first encountered the instrument. She began learning the violin at age 3, starting with weekly lessons. From age 4, her lessons increased to twice a week, where she remembered looking forward to each one. On summer break of her first year in elementary school, her family moved to Machida City, west of Tokyo where she started attending a music school from the second grade. In 1979, Suwanai entered the private Toho Gakuen School of Music’s affiliated ‘Music Class for Children’, a specialised and competitive program across Japan for gifted students. During her childhood, due to her father’s job transfer, she relocated to Nagoya for a period where she studied and was tutored under Shinji Nishizaki, the father of violinist Takako Nishizaki. When she was 14, she studied under the violinist Toshiya Eto. During her middle school years, she won the Japan Student Music Competition (Middle School Division).

== Discography ==
- Bruch: Concerto No. 1 / Scottish Fantasy
  Akiko Suwanai, violin
  Sir Neville Marriner, Academy of St. Martin in the Fields
  November 11, 1997: Philips Classics Records
- Akiko Suwanai: Souvenir
  Akiko Suwanai, violin; Phillip Moll, piano
  June 8, 1998: Philips Classics Records
- Dvořák: Violin Concerto, etc.
  Akiko Suwanai, violin
  Iván Fischer, Budapest Festival Orchestra
  October 9, 2001: Decca Music Group
- Mendelssohn: Violin Concerto in E Minor / Tchaikovsky: Violin Concerto in D Major
  Akiko Suwanai, violin
  Vladimir Ashkenazy, Czech Philharmonic Orchestra
  December 20, 2001: Decca Music Group
- Brahms, Dvořák, Janáček
  Akiko Suwanai, violin
  May 8, 2002: Philips Classics Records
- Sibelius & Walton Violin Concertos
  Akiko Suwanai, violin
  Sakari Oramo, City of Birmingham Symphony Orchestra
  2003: Decca Music Group
- Poème
  Akiko Suwanai, violin
  Charles Dutoit, Philharmonia Orchestra of London
  November 9, 2004: Decca Music Group
- Bach: Violin Concertos
  Akiko Suwanai, violin
  Chamber Orchestra of Europe
  May 2, 2006: Decca Music Group
- Bach: Sonatas and Partitas for Solo Violin
  Akiko Suwanai, violin
  November 24, 2021: Decca Music Group
