= Yan Pascal Tortelier =

French conductor and violinist

Yan Pascal Tortelier (born 19 April 1947) is a French conductor and violinist.

== Biography ==
Born in Paris, Tortelier is the son of the cellist Paul Tortelier, and the brother of Maria de la Pau. Tortelier began piano and violin studies at age 4. At age 14, he was a first-prize winner for violin at the Paris Conservatoire.

Tortelier has worked and recorded extensively in the United Kingdom. He was principal conductor of the Ulster Orchestra from 1989 to 1992. He served as principal conductor of the BBC Philharmonic in Manchester from 1992 to 2003, and now has the title of conductor emeritus with the orchestra. He has also been a principal guest conductor of the National Youth Orchestra of Great Britain (NYOGB).

Tortelier served as principal guest conductor of the Pittsburgh Symphony Orchestra from 2005 to 2008. He was principal conductor of the Orquestra Sinfônica do Estado de São Paulo (OSESP) from 2009 to 2011, and had the title of honorary guest conductor with the OSESP from 2011 to 2013. Tortelier first guest-conducted the Iceland Symphony Orchestra (ISO) in 1998. In October 2015, the ISO announced the appointment of Tortelier as its next chief conductor, effective with the 2016–2017 season, with a contract of 3 years. Tortelier stood down as principal conductor of the Iceland Symphony Orchestra in June 2019.

Tortelier's recordings include his own orchestration of Ravel's Trio. He is a regular recording artist for Chandos Records, and has conducted commercial recordings for Chandos with the BBC Philharmonic, the BBC Symphony Orchestra, and the São Paulo Symphony Orchestra. On Plasson's 1978 recording of Orphée aux enfers, he plays the violin solos.

Cultural offices
Preceded by Vernon Handley	Principal Conductor, Ulster Orchestra; 1989–1992	Succeeded by Dmitry Sitkovetsky
Preceded by Edward Downes	Chief Conductor, BBC Philharmonic; 1992–2003	Succeeded by Gianandrea Noseda
Preceded by John Neschling	Principal Conductor, Orquestra Sinfônica do Estado de São Paulo; 2009–2011	Succeeded by Marin Alsop
Preceded by Ilan Volkov	Principal Conductor, Iceland Symphony Orchestra; 2016–2019	Succeeded by Eva Ollikainen
