= Linus Roth =

German violinist (born 1977)

- Born: 1977 (age 47–48); Ravensburg, West Germany
- Education: Musikhochschule Lübeck
- Occupations: Classical violinist; pedagogue; music festival director
- Organizations: Leopold Mozart Centre
- Website: Official website

Linus Roth (born 1977) is a German classical violinist and string pedagogue. He has performed internationally as a soloist and chamber musician. He is particularly interested in the music of Mieczysław Weinberg, whose complete works featuring a solo violin Roth has recorded. He has been a teacher at the Leopold Mozart Centre, and artistic director of music festivals. Roth plays the 1703 Dancla Stradivarius on loan from Landesbank Baden-Württemberg.

== Career ==
Born in Ravensburg in 1977, Roth grew up in Biberach. Both his parents were church musicians, and he was given violin instruction at an early age. From the age of 12, he attended in Nicolas Chumachenco's pre-class (Vorklasse) at the Musikhochschule Freiburg. Roth studied the violin at the Musikhochschule Lübeck with Zakhar Bron from 1983 to 1986, and later with Ana Chumachenco in Zürich and Munich, graduating with a soloist diploma. He continued his studies with a scholarship of the Anne-Sophie Mutter Foundation.

Roth's debut CD, released in 2006, was awarded the Echo Klassik for the best newcomer. With a particular interest in the works of Mieczysław Weinberg, Roth has recorded all of his works featuring violin solo on the 1703 Dancla Stradivarius. He initiated and co-founded the International Mieczysław Weinberg Society to promote concerts and recordings of Weinberg's works. After recording Weinberg's Violin Sonatas and Violin Concerto, Roth recorded in 2015 his three sonatas for violin solo, interspersed with Shostakovich's Three Fantastic Dances in an arrangement for violin and piano, with the pianist José Gallardo. Writing about the complex second sonata, a reviewer noted that Roth brought "the necessary level of intensity to bear, marshalling its distinct dialogues, monologues and metrically-different paragraphs". Roth received a second Echo Klassik award in 2017 for a recording of Tchaikovsky's Violin Concerto and Shostakovich's Violin Concerto No. 2, with the London Symphony Orchestra conducted by Thomas Sanderling.

Roth has performed as a soloist with orchestras such as the Staatsorchester Stuttgart, the Württemberg Chamber Orchestra, the Münchener Kammerorchester and the SWR Symphonieorchester. Conductors with whom he has collaborated include Gerd Albrecht, Herbert Blomstedt, Andrey Boreyko, Dennis Russell Davies, Hartmut Haenchen, Manfred Honeck, James Gaffigan, Mihkel Kütson and Antoni Wit.

Roth's chamber music partners have included pianist Itamar Golan, cellists Nicolas Altstaedt, Gautier Capuçon and Danjulo Ishizaka, violists Kim Kashkashian and Nils Mönkemeyer, oboist Albrecht Mayer, and clarinetist Andreas Ottensamer. He has worked as a violin teacher at the Leopold Mozart Centre in Augsburg since 2012. In 2019, Roth was the artistic director of the 10th (and final) Internationaler Violinwettbewerb Leopold Mozart Augsburg. He founded the music festival Ibiza Concerts on Ibiza in 2014, and has been the artistic director of the Schwäbischer Frühling festival in Ochsenhausen since 2017.

Roth plays the 1703 Dancla Stradivarius, on loan from Landesbank Baden-Württemberg.

== Awards ==
- 1992, Jugend musiziert, first prize
- 2003, Deutscher Musikwettbewerb, first prize
- 2006, Echo Klassik, best newcomer (Bester Nachwuchskünstler)
- 2017, Echo Klassik, concerto recording of the year (Konzerteinspielung des Jahres)
