= German Conducting Award =

German classical music prize

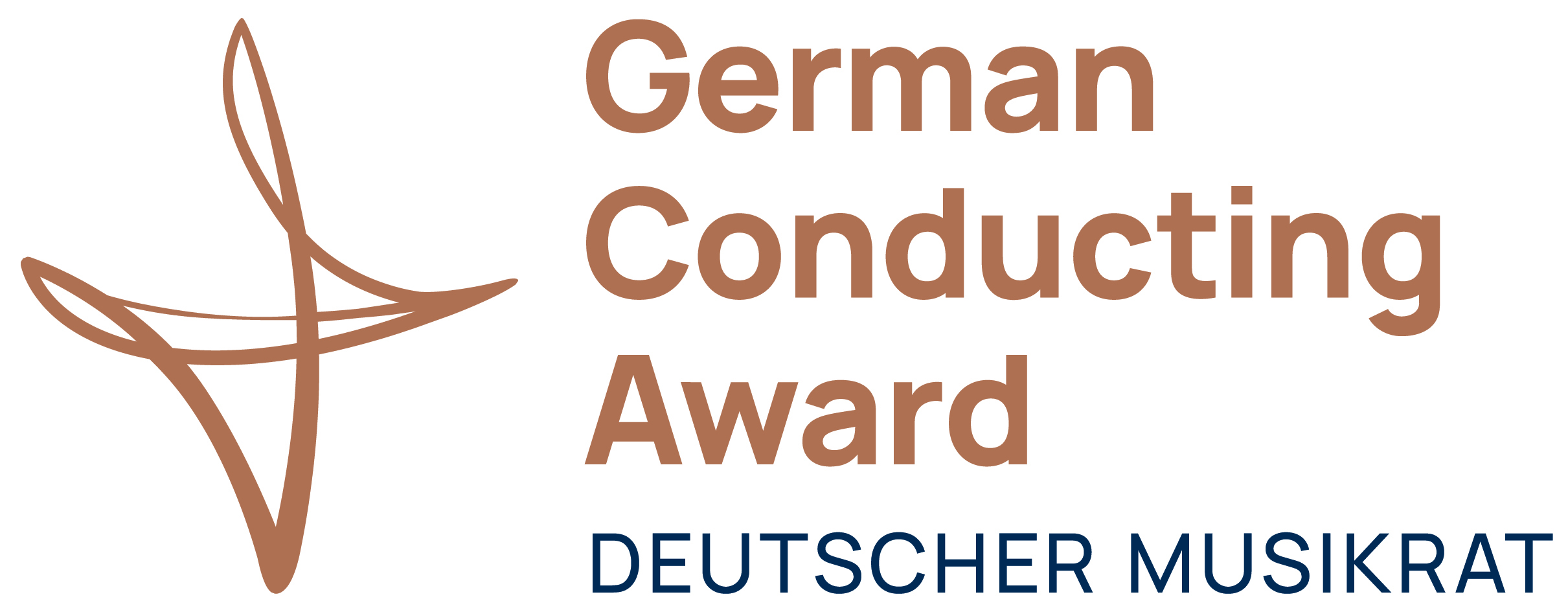
Logo of the German Conducting Award

The German Conducting Award (GCA) (formerly Deutscher Dirigentenpreis) is an international competition for concert and opera conducting and serves to promote young conductors of all nations who are younger than 33 years of age.

== History of the prize ==
The German Conducting Award is organised by the Deutscher Musikrat (Bonn) in partnership with the Kölner Philharmonie, the Cologne Opera, the Gürzenich Orchestra Cologne and the WDR Symphony Orchestra. As a cultural partner, the competition is accompanied by the West German Radio's WDR 3 culture wave. The prize was first awarded in 1995 as the Prize of the Forum Dirigieren to outstanding scholarship holders of the support programme. It was awarded internationally for the first time in 2017 and is held every two years. A unique selling point is the inclusion of the genres of opera and concert in the repertoire. The competition is open to the public from the second round onwards.

== Prize money ==
The prize is endowed with a total of 33,000 euros, making it one of the highest endowed conducting competitions in Europe.

- 1st prize: 15,000 euros (donated by the City of Cologne et al.)
- 2nd prize: 10,000 euros
- 3rd prize: 5,000 euros (donated by the Ursula Lübbe Foundation et al.)
- Kurt Masur Audience Award: 3,000 euros (donated by the International Kurt Masur Institute)

The winners receive concert engagements and assistances at opera houses and German partner orchestras.

== Jury ==
The members of the jury change and for the first award in 2017 consisted of:

- Peter Gülke, honorary chairman, conductor and musicologist
- Lothar Zagrosek, chairman and conductor
- Lioba Braun, Mezzo-soprano
- Siegwald Bütow, Manager and Producer of the WDR Symphony Orchestra
- Louwrens Langevoort, Director of the Cologne Philharmonic Orchestra
- Birgit Meyer, Director of the Cologne Opera
- Stephan Mösch, music and theatre scholar, publicist

== Prize winners ==
=== Winners of the German Conducting Award (from 2017) ===
- 2025:
  - Henri Christopher Aavik (1st prize winner)
  - Luis Toro Araya (2nd prize winner)
  - Friedrich Praetorius (3rd prize winner)
- 2023:
  - Dayner Tafur-Díaz (Peru) (1st prize winner)
  - Nathanaël Iselin (France) (2nd prize winner)
  - Claudio Novati (Italy) (3rd prize winner)
  - Dayner Tafur-Díaz (Peru) (Audience Award)
- 2021:
  - Martijn Dendievel (Belgium) (1st prize winner)
  - Aivis Greters (Latvia) (2nd prize winner)
  - Hangyul Chung (South Korea) (3rd prize winner)
  - Hangyul Chung (South Korea) (Audience Award)
- 2019:
  - Julio García Vico (1st prize winner)
  - Gábor Hontvári (2nd prize winner)
  - Chloé van Soeterstède (3rd prize winner)
- 2017:
  - Hossein Pishkar (1st prize winner)
  - Dominic Beikirch (2nd prize winner)
  - Anna Rakitina (3rd prize winner)
  - Vladimir Yaskorski (special prize winner)

=== Prizewinners of the Conductors' Forum (1995–2015) ===
- 2015: Leo McFall
- 2013: Kristiina Poska
- 2011: Francesco Angelico
- 2009: Simon Gaudenz
- 2006: Mihkel Kütson
- 2004: Markus Poschner
- 2002: Matthias Foremny
- 2001: Christian Voß
- 1999: Gabriel Feltz
- 1995: Marc Piollet
