= Toshiya Eto =

Japanese violinist

Etō Toshiya
- Born: November 9, 1927; Tokyo, Japan
- Died: January 22, 2008 (aged 80); Tokyo, Japan
- Occupation(s): violinist, composer

Toshiya Eto (江藤 俊哉, Etō Toshiya, 9 November 1927 – 22 January 2008) was a Japanese violinist.

== Biography ==
Etō Toshiya was born in 1927 in Toshima, Tokyo. He started violin lessons in 1932. His teacher was Shinichi Suzuki, and Etō Toshiya had lessons from him until age 12. He entered Ikuei Kogei school in 1940, and finished in 1944. From 1943, he took lessons from Alexander Mogilevsky, who taught at Tokyo School of Music.

From 1944 to 1948, Etō Toshiya studied music at Tokyo School of Music. When he was a student, he had joined as a quartet member. His quartet's members were Toshiya Etō(vl), Akeo Watanabe(Vl), Kimiyo Matsuura(Va) and Hideo Saito(Vc), who would lead the Japanese classical music scene in the coming years. He graduated from this school and then continued his studies at the Curtis Institute of Music in Philadelphia under the great violinist Efrem Zimbalist. In 1951, he gave his first performance at Carnegie Hall.

Etō Toshiya came back Japan in 1961, and continued his artistic performance and teaching. He taught at Toho Gakuen School of Music from 1963, and Akiko Suwanai and Yayoi Toda were known as his students. He was a member of the Japan Art Academy and then became head of the Toho Gakuen School of Music before he died at the age of 80 on June 23, 2008.

== Links ==
- Cinii－List of works
- Rutgers University

== See also ==
- Dancla Stradivarius (1710)
