= Anna Rakitina =

Russian conductor (born 1989)

Anna Leonidovna Rakitina (Russian: Анна Леонидовна Ракитина; born 1989 in Moscow) is a Russian conductor.

== Life and Career ==
Anna Rakitina comes from a Ukrainian-Russian family; her father is Ukrainian and her mother is Russian. Shortly after the Russian invasion of Ukraine began in 2022, Rakitina publicly took a clear stand against the policies of Vladimir Putin.

Rakitina initially received instruction in violin and voice and later studied conducting under Stanislav Dyachenko at the Moscow Conservatory and Ulrich Windfuhr at the Hamburg University of Music and Theatre, where she completed her master's degree in 2018. She also attended masterclasses with Gennady Rozhdestvensky, Vladimir Jurowski, and Johannes Schlaefli, as well as with Alan Gilbert and Bernard Haitink as part of the Lucerne Festival Academy.

From 2019 until the summer of 2023, she served as an assistant to Andris Nelsons at the Boston Symphony Orchestra, conducting the ensemble at venues such as the Tanglewood Festival.

In 2025, she conducted the Houston Symphony Orchestra and the Orchestra of St. Luke's, as well as the Malaysian Philharmonic Orchestra and Korean National Symphony Orchestra. That year she also conducted the festival orchestra at the Shostakovich Festival, Leipzig, in the cello concerto and the fifth symphony.

In March 2026 she conducted the Milan Symphony Orchestra in a programme of music by British composers; in September of that year she conducted the Bruckner Orchester Linz in Tchaikovsky's 'Pathetique' symphony.

In Germany, she has conducted orchestras including the WDR Symphony Orchestra, the Hamburg Symphony Orchestra, the Deutsches Symphonie-Orchester Berlin, the Berlin Radio Symphony Orchestra (performing at venues such as the Berlin Philharmonie and the Konzerthaus Berlin), the Gürzenich Orchestra Cologne, the Meiningen Court Orchestra, and the Nuremberg Symphony Orchestra.

Internationally, she has conducted ensembles such as the Orchestre Philharmonique de Radio France, the BBC Philharmonic, the Royal Concertgebouw Orchestra, the Danish National Symphony Orchestra, the National Philharmonic of Russia, and numerous orchestras in the USA—including the San Francisco Symphony, the New York Philharmonic, the Los Angeles Philharmonic, the Chicago Symphony Orchestra, and the Baltimore Symphony Orchestra —as well as the Vancouver Symphony Orchestra, the Orchestra del Maggio Musicale Fiorentino, Festival Strings Lucerne, the George Enescu Philharmonic in Bucharest, the Yomiuri Nippon Symphony Orchestra (at Suntory Hall), the Taiwan National Orchestra, and the Taipei Symphony Orchestra.

== Awards ==
- 2015: 3rd Prize at the TCO International Conducting Competition in Taipei
- 2017: 3rd Prize at the German Conducting Award (Deutscher Dirigentenpreis)
- 2018: 2nd Prize at the Malko Competition
- 2025: European Cultural Award
