= Elena Schwarz (conductor) =

Australian-Swiss conductor (born 1985)

Elena Schwarz (born 1985 in Lugano) is an Australian-Swiss conductor.

== Life ==
Elena Schwarz grew up in Switzerland and initially studied cello and musicology at the Haute école de musique de Genève. She went on to complete a master's degree in conducting under Laurent Gay. She continued her training by specializing in the performance practice of contemporary music with Arturo Tamayo at the Conservatorio della Svizzera italiana in Lugano, and by taking further courses with Péter Eötvös and Matthias Pintscher. She also participated in masterclasses with Bernard Haitink at the Lucerne Festival and with Neeme Järvi at the Gstaad Festival.

During the 2017/2018 season, Schwarz served as an assistant conductor with the Orchestre Philharmonique de Radio France (assisting Mikko Franck), the Tasmanian Symphony Orchestra, and the West Australian Symphony Orchestra (under Asher Fisch). In the 2018/2019 season, she was selected for the Los Angeles Philharmonic's Dudamel Fellowship Program.

In May 2017, Schwarz conducted a Ravel program with the Orchestre philharmonique de Radio France, stepping in at the last minute for Mikko Franck. Shortly thereafter, she conducted a performance of Bruckner's Symphony No. 7 at the Festival de Saint-Denis. She made her debut at the Lucerne Festival with a portrait concert dedicated to the composer Olga Neuwirth. She has also appeared at the Martha Argerich Festival in Lugano, where she conducted Alban Berg's Chamber Concerto featuring soloists Renaud Capuçon and Nicholas Angelich. She focuses particularly on contemporary music; she has conducted world premieres by Péter Eötvös and Georges Aperghis, and led ensembles such as Ensemble Modern, Musikfabrik Niederösterreich, Klangforum Wien, Ensemble intercontemporain, and the Lucerne Festival Contemporary Orchestra. Starting in January 2024, Schwarz began a three-year tenure as Conductor in Residence with Klangforum Wien.

In the winter of 2021/22, she made her debuts with the BBC Philharmonic Orchestra, the Royal Liverpool Philharmonic Orchestra, and the Detroit Symphony Orchestra. In April 2022, she conducted the Staatsorchester Hannover at the Hanover Opera House, performing works by Jean Sibelius, George Crumb, and Antonín Dvořák. In June 2023, she conducted the Bremen Philharmonic for the first time at Die Glocke in Bremen; the program included Richard Strauss's Oboe Concerto in D major as well as the work Hava by contemporary Finnish composer Lotta Wennäkoski.

Schwarz gained experience in the opera repertoire by serving as an assistant to Mikko Franck at the Chorégies d'Orange Festival (Madama Butterfly and Rigoletto) and with the Orchestre Philharmonique de Radio France (Elektra), and by assisting Kazushi Ōno with the Orchestre de Paris at the Festival d'Aix-en-Provence (Prokofiev's The Fiery Angel). She has made guest appearances at the Norwegian National Opera in Oslo (Hänsel und Gretel), the Opéra National de Lyon (Peer Gynt), and the Festival d’Aix-en-Provence (Adam Maor’s The Sleeping Thousand). In the 2023/24 season, she made her debut at the Stuttgart State Opera as the musical director for the world premiere of Dora.

== Prizes and awards ==
- 2014: First prize at the Princess Astrid International Music Competition (Trondheim)
- 2015: Second prize at the Jorma Panula Conducting Competition (Vaasa)
- 2018/19: Dudamel Fellow with the Los Angeles Philharmonic Orchestra
