= Ilan Volkov =

Israeli orchestral conductor (born 1976)

Ilan Volkov (Hebrew: אילן וולקוב; born September 8, 1976, Tel Aviv) is an Israeli orchestral conductor, who has been chief conductor and guest conductor of a number of orchestras.

== Biography ==
Volkov's father, Alexander Volkov, was a concert pianist. Ilan studied with the conductor Mendi Rodan at the Rubin Academy in Jerusalem, before continuing at the Royal Academy of Music in London. At age 19, he was named young conductor in association to the Northern Sinfonia. He later served as conductor of Young Sinfonia, the youth orchestra of the Northern Sinfonia. In 1997, he became principal conductor of the London Philharmonic Youth Orchestra. In 1999, Seiji Ozawa named Volkov the assistant conductor with the Boston Symphony Orchestra.

Volkov first conducted the BBC Scottish Symphony Orchestra (BBC SSO) in 1998. He became chief conductor of the BBC SSO in January 2003, the youngest chief conductor appointed to a BBC orchestra at the time. He was named the Royal Philharmonic Society Young Musician of the Year in 2004, in recognition of his work with the BBC SSO. In December 2008, the BBC SSO announced the appointment of Volkov as its principal guest conductor, to commence after the conclusion of his tenure as chief conductor in September 2009.

In January 2011, the Iceland Symphony Orchestra named Volkov as its chief conductor and music director. Volkov concluded his tenure in August 2014, following the orchestra's debut at The Proms.

Volkov first guest-conducted the Brussels Philharmonic in March 2021. In February 2022, the orchestra announced his appointment as principal guest conductor, for the 2022–2023 season.

Volkov has made a specialty of recording long-unperformed or never before recorded works by neglected artists. He has spoken of his affinity with music written between 1909 and the (19)20s. He has made several recordings for the Hyperion label.

Volkov and the free jazz musicians Assif Tsahar and Daniel Sarid have established the performing venue Levontin 7.

== Activism ==
In September 2025, after a concert at Royal Albert Hall in London, Volkov condemned Israel's war on Gaza as well as the destruction and high civilian casualties. He also urged for an intervention by the international community, stating that Israelis, Jews, and Palestinians "won't be able to stop this alone."

On 19 September, Volkov was arrested by Israeli police during a protest at the Gaza–Israel border, calling for an end of the genocide in Gaza stating, "We need to stop the genocide now. It's ruining everyone's lives. Stop it."

Cultural offices
Preceded by Osmo Vänskä	Chief Conductor, BBC Scottish Symphony Orchestra; 2003-2009	Succeeded by Donald Runnicles
Preceded by Rumon Gamba	Chief Conductor and Music Director, Iceland Symphony Orchestra; 2011-2014	Succeeded by Yan Pascal Tortelier
