= Wilhelm Lanzky-Otto =

Wilhelm Lanzky-Otto (January 30, 1909 – April 13, 1991) was a Danish-born horn player. He is credited with inspiring a generation of Scandinavian horn players. He was educated in Copenhagen as a pianist, organist and horn player. During his life he was principal horn in the Danish National Symphony Orchestra, the Royal Danish Orchestra, the Iceland Symphony Orchestra, the Gothenburg Symphony Orchestra, and the Royal Stockholm Philharmonic Orchestra. From 1932 till 1945 he was a member of Blæserkvintetten af 1932. Later he worked in Reykjavík, Gothenburg and Stockholm. He and Philip Farkas are compared often because of their great talent for teaching. Both are well known among horn players in their areas of the world. His son, Ib Lanzky-Otto, was also a horn player.

== CDs ==
- Music for French Horn. (Bis, 1995)
- The Scandinavian Horn. (Bis, 1995)
