= Lilyan Kaiv =

Estonian orchestral conductor

Lilyan Kaiv (born 17 June 1974, in Tartu) is an Estonian choral and orchestral conductor and cultural manager.

== Biography ==
In 1980 she began violin lessons. She started to study choir conducting in 1989, in the Heino Eller Tartu Music High School. During her studies she founded her first chamber choir "Ma non troppo"; during the eight years she directed the choir it thrived and won prizes.

She graduated from the Heino Eller Tartu Music School with a specialization in choral conducting (studying under Alo Ritsing) in 1993 and from the Estonian Academy of Music in the class of Prof. Toomas Kapten in 1998.

In competitions for conductors in 1997 and 2000 in Riga, Latvia, Lilyan Kaiv won first prize.

Since 2000, Lilyan Kaiv has served as the conductor of the Eller Sinfonietta.

She won the international competition of young conductors in Tallinn in 2002.

In 2003, she won second place at the Jorma Panula Conducting Competition.

In 2005, Kaiv completed her studies in symphony orchestra conducting at the Estonian Academy of Music (under Associate Professor Jüri Alperten).

Additionally, she has participated in masterclasses led by Neeme Järvi, Paavo Järvi, Eri Klas, Neil Thomson, Jorma Panula, Alexander Dmitriev, and Vladimir Ponkin. She has achieved high rankings in international competitions.

Since 2009, Lilyan Kaiv has been the head of the choral conducting department at the Heino Eller Tartu Music College.

She reached the finals of the Blue Danube competition for opera conductors in Bulgaria in 2013 and again in 2015, and was also a finalist in the International Competition for Opera Conductors Luigi Mancinelli in 2014 at Orvieto, Italy.

Lilyan Kaiv has conducted many orchestras, including the Dohnanyi Orchestra Budafok (Hungary), Saint Petersburg Academic Symphony Orchestra, Moscow Chamber Orchestra, Estonian National Symphony Orchestra, Liepāja Symphony Orchestra, Pärnu City Orchestra and the Estonian National Youth Symphony Orchestra.

As of September 2025, she is the director of the Räpina Parish Cultural Centre.

== Awards ==
- 1996 and 1999 Gustav Ernesaks Scholarship
- 1997 Competition for conductors, Riga, Latvia, first place
- 2000 Competition for conductors, Riga, Latvia, first place
- 2002 Competition of young conductors, Tallinn, first place
- 2003 Jorma Panula Conducting Competition, second place
