= Dancla Stradivarius (1710) =

1710 Stradivarius violin

Dancla violin by Stradivari or Dancla, Milstein is a 1710 Stradivarius violin which is referred to as the "Dancla. It was made by Italian luthier Antonio Stradivari of Cremona and named after the French violinist Charles Dancla.

== Dimensions ==
The violin's dimensions are: Length of back 35.2 cm (13.9 in), upper bout 16.65 cm (6.56 in), middle bout 10.8 cm (4.3 in), and lower bouts 20.55 cm (8.09 in).

== History ==
The violin was made by the instrument maker Antonio Stradivari in 1710 and it still has its original maker's label. There are two Stradivarius violins which share the name "Dancla", the 1710 Dancla and the Dancla Stradivarius (1703). The violin is sometimes classified as the "Dancla Milstein" because it owned and used in performances by American virtuoso violinist Nathan Milstein. The violin was constructed during what is considered Antonio Stradivari's "Golden period"

In 1930 the violin was in the Wurlitzer collection. The curator of the collection, J.C. Freeman said that the violin was valued at $45,000.

From 1994 to 2008 the violin was played by Japanese violinist Toshiya Eto.

== Provenance ==
It was owned by renowned violinist M. Florent, and later it was sold to Jean Baptist Charles. The violin was owned by French Violin Virtuoso and Professor, Charles Dancla who died in 1907. In 1925 American businessman Rodman Wanamaker purchased the 1710 Dancla. Wanamaker allowed the instrument to be used by musicians in the auditoriums of Wanamaker stores.

After Wanamaker's death all of the instruments in his collection were purchased by the Rudolph Wurlitzer Company and became part of the Wurlitzer Collection. The 1710 Dancla was part of the collection. In 1934 Nathan Milstein then purchased the 1710 Dancla from the collection and he used it in concerts until the 1940s. Milstein later sold the violin to Russian violinist Louis Krasner.

== See also ==
- List of Stradivarius instruments
