= Dancla Stradivarius (1703) =

1703 Stradivarius violin

Dancla violin by Stradivari is a c. 1703 Stradivarius violin which is referred to as the "Dancla." It was made by Italian luthier Antonio Stradivari of Cremona and named after the French violinist Charles Dancla. The violin is currently owned by Landesbank Baden-Württemberg and on loan to German violinist Linus Roth.

== History ==
The violin was made by the instrument maker Antonio Stradivari c. 1703 and the back of the instrument is 35.6 cm (14.0 in). The violin was named after the French violinist Charles Dancla because he played it for two decades. In 1959 the violin was described as having exceptional tone and still in perfect condition. The 1703 violin known as ‘Dancla’ still retains its maker's label ‘Antonius Stradivarius Cremonensis Faciebat Anno 1703’. There are two Stradivarius violins which share the name "Dancla", one was which was made in 1703 and another one which was also owned by Charles Dancla the Dancla Stradivarius (1710).

== Provenance ==
In 1942 a diamond merchant named Siegried Kahl purchased the violin. In 1959 Kahl sold the violin to a dealer in England named Jim Reno for 22,932 USD. At the time it was believed to be a record price.

The Dancla is now owned by the Landesbank Baden-Württemberg and on loan to renowned German violinist Linus Roth. Copies have been made of the 1703 Dancla; one such copy was made by British luthier David Rubio and was played by Simon Standage.

== See also ==
- List of Stradivarius instruments
