= Mihkel Kütson =

Estonian conductor (born 1971)

Mihkel Kütson (born 11 September 1971) is an Estonian conductor.

He is the principal conductor for Schleswig-Holstein Landestheater and Vanemuine Theatre (1994-2004 and since 2008).

Awards:

- 2006 Deutscher Dirigentenpreis
