= Iceland Symphony Orchestra =

National orchestra of Iceland

- Orchestra
- Native name: Sinfóníuhljómsveit Íslands
- Founded: 1950
- Concert hall: Harpa (concert hall)
- Principal conductor: Barbara Hannigan (August 2026–)
- Website: en.sinfonia.is

Sinfóníuhljómsveit Íslands (Iceland Symphony Orchestra) (ISO) is an Icelandic orchestra based in Reykjavík. Its primary concert venue is the Harpa Concert Hall. The Iceland Symphony is an autonomous public institution under the auspices of the Icelandic Ministry of Education. Iceland Symphony Orchestra made its home in Háskólabíó (University Cinema) from 1961 to 2011 but moved into the new 1800-seat Harpa Concert Hall in spring 2011. The orchestra gives approximately sixty concerts each season. Per a 1982 law (changed in 2007), the Iceland Symphony's primary financial sources are the Icelandic treasury (82%) and the City of Reykjavik (18%).

Barbara Hannigan has been chief conductor and artistic director of the orchestra since August 2026. Osmo Vänskä is the orchestra's honorary conductor, and Vladimir Ashkenazy holds the post of Conductor Laureate. Daníel Bjarnason is the orchestra's artist-in-association. Anna Thorvaldsdottir became the orchestra's composer-in-residence in 2018. Víkingur Heiðar Ólafsson joined the roster in 2021 as artist in residence, and Bertrand de Billy the same year as principal guest conductor. Kornilios Michailidis was appointed as conductor-in-residence in 2021.

== History ==
=== Background (1921–1950) ===
The first known instance of an orchestra concert in Iceland was on May 22, 1921, when a group of 20 jobbing musicians played for King Christian X of Denmark who was on an official visit in the country. The same basic group and its conductor, composer Þórarinn Guðmundsson, became the founding members of an official orchestra, The Reykjavík Orchestra (Hljómsveit Reykjavíkur; RO), in the same year. The RO remained virtually the only functional orchestra in Iceland until the founding of the ISO in 1950. Among the highpoints of the RO's operating time was a celebration in Þingvellir on the occasion of the 1000-year anniversary of the Icelandic national Parliament in 1930, which saw the premiere of several compositions by Icelandic composers.

Among other steps toward the foundation of ISO was the foundation of the Reykjavík Music School (Tónlistarskóli Reykjavíkur) in 1930 and the foundation of The Icelandic Federation of Musicians (Félag íslenskra hljóðfæraleikara, later renamed Félag íslenskra hljómlistarmanna; FÍH) in 1939, which became the most influential trade union of musicians in Iceland during the 20th century. Several reputable Icelandic musicians, composers and music enthusiasts wrote articles in local newspapers during this period where Iceland's primitive state of musical culture was reprimanded, most notably Jón Leifs (1899-1968), composer and conductor, who had studied at the Leipzig Conservatory during World War I. Leifs emphasized the inevitable need of a decent symphony orchestra lest Iceland should lag behind other civilized countries. Furthermore, the growing music industry was stimulated by a handful of European musicians who came to live and work in Iceland during the first half of the century. Among the most influential were Franz Mixa (1902–1994), Victor Urbancic (1903–1958) and Wilhelm Lanzky-Otto (1909–1991).

=== Foundation and first years (1950–1956) ===
During the late forties, the dream of a professional orchestra loomed ever larger in public discussion in Iceland. A group of musicians, led by composers Páll Ísólfsson (1893-1974) and Jón Þórarinsson (1917-2012), wrote a formal proposal to the government where suggestions of administration and ownership of the planned orchestra were put forward. Eysteinn Jónsson (1906-1993), minister of culture, introduced a bill in Parliament during the winter of 1947-1948 where a special fund for the management of an orchestra was planned. Jónsson's bill assumed that financial support should come from The National Radio (Ríkisútvarpið; RÚV), The Reykjavík Music Society (Tónlistarfélag Reykjavíkur) and The National Theatre (Þjóðleikhúsið), which was not yet in operation. The rest of the funding was supposed to come from a tax imposed on movie tickets. However, there was no agreement on the bill in Parliament as MPs representing constituencies outside Reykjavík expressed great antagonism to the idea.

In 1950, the steering committee of RÚV agreed to experimentally finance the activity of an orchestra of 40 members for a few months. No formal inaugural meeting was held so the orchestra's foundation date is considered March 9, 1950 when its first concert took place.

At the outset, the ISO was efficient in concerting and gave fifteen public performances during its first year of existence. However, the beginning was unpromising from a financial perspective: operating costs were higher than those applied to any other musical institution in the country, no budget estimates had yet been made, and the public response was marked by a lack of interest. Wage disputes were frequent, and members of the orchestra, most of whom worked part-time, regularly consulted their unions. In early 1953, members of the orchestra went on strike on account of overdue wage payments.

Only a few weeks after the ISO's inauguration, Þjóðleikhúsið opened for the first time, and the two institutions maintained a close alliance for several years. The ISO had no venue of its own, so concerts were normally held in Þjóðleikhúsið, and the orchestra provided music for theatrical performances.

Of the forty founding members, fourteen came from out of Iceland. This made the ISO an unconventional organization in Iceland since the country's level of immigration had always been extremely low.

In 1954, the running of the ISO was incorporated into RÚV. This meant that the orchestra's members had more job security and more wage stability than before. However, attendance to concerts remained low, and after the first twelve months of the collaboration with RÚV, the orchestra was run at a great loss. Bjarni Benediktsson, minister of culture, appointed a committee for heightened efficiency of the management. Debates in Parliament followed, and since increased subscription fees for RÚV seemed the most logical conclusion, no agreement was reached on the matter. Consequently, the activity of ISO came to a halt, and no concerts were held during the winter of 1955–1956.

=== Rebranding and revitalization (1956–1982) ===
In March 1956, advances were made towards restoring the ISO as a private institution and reinstating routine performances. A new board was appointed, headed by Ragnar Jónsson, book publisher and art patron. Operating summaries and work schedules gradually became better organized. The orchestra's title had previously been Sinfóníuhljómsveitin ("The Symphony Orchestra") but was now formally changed to Sinfóníuhljómsveit Íslands (The Icelandic Symphony Orchestra). Bjarni Benediktsson, minister of culture, was the main advocate of the new title and showed great interest in defining the orchestra as a national treasure. One factor of this approach was the idea of habitually touring the orchestra around the whole country instead of limiting concerts to Reykjavík alone.

The ISO's first performance outside Reykjavík was in Akureyri on 21 May 1956. In the following years, annual concert tours took place, normally at the end of the season. Duration of tours was typically between one and two weeks. The orchestra's first trip abroad was to the Faroe Islands in 1977.

The upsurge that started in 1956 was not to be long-lasting. In 1960, the orchestra's board found itself relapsing into financial difficulties, partly due to a high inflation that annually reduced the Icelandic króna's purchasing power by around 10%. Attendance to concerts remained moderate, and earnings were negligible. In February 1961, the board decided to seek renewed ties with RÚV and reshape the ISO as a de facto department of the radio. The board was divided on the issue, and Chairman Jónsson was opposed to the shift. The final result, however, was a rearrangement of the orchestra as a subdivision of RÚV. The arrangement was intended as a temporary solution but remained unchanged until 1982, when Alþingi passed a law on the ISO. Collaboration with Þjóðleikhúsið remained virtually unchanged until 1971, when a contract was made between the two institutions, loosening the ISO's players from their former duties as unpaid participants in the theater's performances.

In 1961, the ISO was transferred to its new residence in Háskólabíó, Reykjavík's largest movie theater. This was the first time that the ISO was able to practice on a permanent basis in the same location as its concerts were held. However, dissatisfaction grew since the acoustics of Háskólabíó were considered unsatisfactory for orchestra concerts. Bohdan Wodiczko, principal conductor, expressed his dislike of Háskólabíó early on, and for the next decades, similar views are frequent in interviews with conductors, players and other people connected with the ISO. Háskólabíó remained the orchestra's main venue for fifty years until the opening of Harpa Concert Hall in 2011.

During the 1960s and 1970s, the ISO gradually grew and developed. No formal regulations existed on the orchestra's management, and its relationship with sponsors was more or less random. In 1976, Vilhjálmur Hjálmarsson, minister of culture, appointed a committee to write a parliamentary bill for the ISO. The committee wrote a draft, which was rearranged by a new committee appointed in 1978. The proposals underlined the importance of the ISO's independence towards RÚV and Þjóðleikhúsið – the orchestra should be able to stand on its own and not only serve as a satellite of the other two institutions. The parliamentary bill was approved in Alþingi on 26 April 1982.

=== Institutionalization (1982–2022) ===
After the passing of the ISO law in 1982, the orchestra received provisions for the national budget. The number of players in the ISO subsequently grew, with 40 salaried players in 1950, 65 in 1986, 72 in 2000, and 95 in 2016.

In 1986, the ISO offered season tickets and subscription packages for the first time. The subscription system was based on four types or "series": Yellow series (large orchestral works, local soloists), Red series (solo concertos, foreign soloists), Green series (accessible music, e.g. Viennese waltzes and operettas) and Blue series (contemporary music and Icelandic works). The system underwent some changes during the next years and in 2016, it was arranged as follows: Red series (with a primary focus on large orchestral works), Yellow series (mostly Classical and early Romantic works), Green series (popular favourites) and Blue series (family concerts).

In 1998, Sigrún Eðvaldsdóttir took the position of 1st concertmaster of the Iceland Symphony Orchestra.

Collaborating with Icelandic schools and holding school concerts where students of various ages are invited in groups, during the 2000s, ISO expanded its child-targeted marketing and promotion to a considerable extent. In 2007, Barbara the clown (played by Halldóra Geirharðsdóttir) performed as a concert announcer for the first time and in 2008, the ISO introduced Maximús Músíkús, a mouse mascot aimed at young children. In family concerts, Barbara and Maximús became regular guests.

In 2012, the ISO held its first annual Tectonics Festival at the Harpa Concert Hall, as created by Ilan Volkov, chief conductor. In 2013, the principal guest at the festival was composer Christian Wolff. In July 2014, the ISO had 92 members, of whom around 80% were natives to Iceland. The ISO around 2015 held around 60 concerts annually. Concerts were broadcast live on RÚV's Rás 1 (national radio station). In March 2015, the ISO began collaborating with Icelandic telephone company Síminn, broadcasting videos of chosen concerts. Video recordings were accessible to subscribers, but a number of them could be found on the ISO's YouTube channel.

The group again hosted Tectonics Reykjavik in 2014, had recently worked with the metal band Skálmöld, and made its first appearance at The Proms in London, England. In 2015, Tectonics was again held in Harpa, as was the ISO-associated Dark Music Days. In May 2016, the ISO performed two shows with Emilíana Torrini in an unplugged show at Harpa Concert Hall, conducted by Hugh Brunt. In October 2016, the ISO performed certain parts of the score for the 1940 Fantasia, in an event organized with the Reykjavik International Film Festival.

Composer Anna Thorvaldsdóttir took up a residency with the ISO in early 2019. Later that year, she performed at ISO's hosted Dark Music Days event. Also that year, Eva Ollikainen was appointed chief conductor and artistic director in a four-year contract to commence with the 2021 season. In February 2020, the ISO played Usher Hall in Edinburgh with Yan Pascal Tortelier conducting. That month, the orchestra was nominated for five Icelandic Music Awards.

In June 2020, it was announced Björk would perform with sections of the orchestra that August at Harpa. On August 29, 2020, after a 20-day delay, Björk postponed the live-streamed series to 2021. In January and February 2021, Björk also planned to play at Harpa. The plans were scrapped due to COVID-19. After the shows were rescheduled due to COVID-19 regulations, new dates were announced in September, and starting October 11, 2021, Björk performed four shows at Harpa Reykjavik Concert Hall, collaborating with the ISI on a dozen songs from her various albums. The shows were live-streamed.

By January 2021, the Iceland Symphony Orchestra released the recording Occurrence on the record label Sono Luminus. It was performed by the ISO and featured Pekka Kuusisto "leading the violin concerto that Daniel Bjarnason wrote for him," with Bjarnason conducting. The album contains compositions by Anna Þorvaldsdóttir, Haukur Tómasson, María Huld Markan Sigfúsdóttir and Páll Ragnar Pálsson, and features the soloists Sæunn Þorsteinsdóttir and Víkingur Heiðar Ólafsson. After being last nominated in 2009, the ISO was again nominated for a Grammy in 2021: for Best Orchestral Performance for Concurrence at the 2021 Grammy Awards, losing to the Los Angeles Philharmonic.

In 2021, the ISO performed the score for the film Katla. The ISO performed for some 5,000 people receiving the COVID-19 vaccine in Reykjavik's mass vaccination center in April 2021, after contacting vaccination official and asking to play a concert. At the 2021 Icelandic Music Awards that month, the ISO won Best Group Performer in the Classical and Contemporary Music category.

In October 2021, Víkingur Ólafsson was appointed artist-in-residence for the Iceland Symphony Orchestra's next season, with his residency beginning November 18, 2021. Daníel Bjarnason, as an ISO artist-in-collaboration, was named as director of one of the concerts, among others. When Ólafsson had toured in late 2019 after he was named Gramophone Artist of 2019, Daníel Bjarnason conducted his performance with the ISO.

== Iceland Symphony Youth Orchestra ==
In 2009, the ISO's Youth orchestra was established. Each year around 100 music school students form the Iceland Symphony Youth Orchestra. The Orchestra has performed Symphony no. 5 and Symphony no. 10 by Dimitri Shostakovich, The Planets by Gustav Holst, Symphony no. 5 by Gustav Mahler, and The Rite of Spring by Igor Stravinsky. In 2016, The ISO's Youth Orchestra was awarded the Brightest Hope prize at the Icelandic Music Awards, after being nominated in 2011.

== Principal conductors ==
=== Chief conductors ===
Olav Kielland (1952–1955)

Kielland introduced a degree of discipline and professionalism unmatched in earlier stages of the Icelandic music world. He wrote a code of conduct that was supposed to apply during the orchestra's practice sessions. Kielland was considered a temperamental and colorful character and several anecdotes survive from members who served under his command. The German players of the ISO are said to have received a particularly harsh treatment from Kielland. Nevertheless, Kielland's arrival was generally acclaimed in the papers and seen as clear step forward for the young orchestra. Kielland's three-year contract expired in 1955 and was not renewed. After his departure from the ISO, no principal conductor was employed on a permanent basis until 1965.

Bohdan Wodiczko (1965–1968, 1970–1971)

Wodiczko first conducted a concert of the ISO on 22 February 1960 when Chopin's 150th anniversary was celebrated. The collaboration was fruitful and Wodiczko conducted ten more concerts during the following season. In 1965 he signed a three-year contract as principal conductor. Wodiczko had a reputation as a recluse who confined his social life in Iceland to the company of orchestra members. During his stay in Iceland, Wodiczko was greatly motivated by his ambition to enhance the local cultural scene; in a 1961 interview he stated that his monthly salary with the ISO roughly equalled the amount they would receive for a single concert in Europe. The ISO's repertoire underwent considerable changes during Wodiczko's time in office, moving enhancingly towards modern music instead of classical and romantic compositions.

Karsten Andersen (1973–1978)

Andersen first conducted a concert of the ISO on 9 June 1972 as part of the Reykjavik Arts Festival when held for the second time. His conservative taste in music resulted in a highly conventional repertoire and little risk-taking. Andersen held office as principal conductor of the Bergen Philharmonic Orchestra while working with the ISO and traveled frequently between Norway and Iceland, spending on average one week every month in Iceland. Andersen's time in office marks the ISO's unbroken period of principal conductors.

Jean-Pierre Jacquillat (1978–1986)

Jacquillat introduced French impressionistic compositions in the ISO's repertoire in a greater degree than any of his predecessors. When asked in a 1986 interview whether he considered himself to have acquired anything positive as principal conductor, Jacquillat replied: "It is up to others to judge. In any case, I can boast of having introduced a lot of French music to Icelandic listeners. There are several French composers I would have liked to play here, like Boulez and Messiaen, but the orchestra is simply too small." Newspaper articles and memoirs of ISO's members describe Jacquillat as an extrovert and embracing personality. Jacquillat died in a car accident merely three months after completing his contract with the ISO.

Petri Sakari (1987–1993, 1996–1998)

Sakari, a violinist, was markedly ambitious about training the orchestra's string players. He conducted the ISO for the first time in 1986 and described his relationship with the orchestra as "love at first sight". During his time as principal conductor, the ISO signed a contract of recording ten albums with Chandos Records. Sakari conducted the orchestra on most of them. Sakari also conducted the ISO in recordings of the complete symphonies by Jean Sibelius, made for Naxos Records in 1998–2000. Sakari often described his views on how the ISO's board might improve the orchestra's conditions, e.g. by hiring more players, financing more trips abroad and creating the position of assistant conductor.

Osmo Vänskä (1993–1996)

Vänskä's period as conductor was marked by considerable activity on the international music scene, including a February and March 1996 US tour. Vänskä was criticized by several Icelandic composers for not giving priority to Icelandic compositions on ISO's concerts. His reply to these criticisms was summarized in a 1996 interview: "Icelandic music should not be on the ISO’s repertoire unless it is truly deserving. It is the music’s quality, not origin, which is most important." In 2014, Vänskä signed a contract as the ISO's principal guest conductor. His contract was renewed in 2016 and Vänskä held the post until 2020. In 2017, the ISO named Vänskä its honorary conductor.

Rico Saccani (1998–2001)

Saccani conducted the ISO regularly as a guest conductor from 1987 before becoming principal conductor in 1998. When asked about his aims for the ISO, Saccani declared that he wanted to focus on more southern and operatic styles of music and highlight compositions by Italian, Spanish and French composers. As for the ISO's management, Saccani proposed increased sponsorship as a solution to prevent financial difficulties. Saccani renewed his contract in 2000 and was supposed to serve as conductor until 2002, but in March 2001, he abruptly abandoned the position, left the country and was unreachable for weeks. Several rumors surrounded Saccani's retirement: An opinion poll is said to have been held among the ISO's players where the results were confidential and clearly expressing a negative view towards the conductor. On May 18, Saccani published an announcement where he stated that he left because of illness.

Rumon Gamba (2002–2010)

Gamba was 29 years old when engaged at the ISO, thereby becoming the youngest principal conductor in the orchestra's history. He often underlined the ISO's key role in promoting Icelandic music: "Which orchestra should take care of it if not the ISO?" Gamba conducted the ISO in several recordings for Chandos Records and greatly emphasized the value of recordings to make the orchestra visible on the international scene. Gamba's repertoire was diversified, and among ISO's projects during his period was playing all of Shostakovich's symphonies over a five-year period.

Ilan Volkov (2011–2014)

Ilan Volkov's inauguration as principal conductor nearly coincided with the ISO's transfer to Harpa Concert Hall and he was frequently asked to comment on the building's qualities in the media. Shortly after he started working in Iceland, Volkov stated in an interview that he had accepted the position because he was interested in finding a venue where he could develop his ideas more freely. Two and a half years later, shortly before the end of his term in position, Volkov confessed that his initial aims for the ISO had miscarried up to a point:

"I did have a lot of freedom with the repertoire for the first couple of years, but financial constraints meant that we had to be a bit more careful with the programming in the final one."

Yan Pascal Tortelier (2016–2019)

In October 2015, the ISO announced the appointment of Yan Pascal Tortelier as principal conductor, as of the 2016–2017 season. He had first guest-conducted the ISO at the Reykjavik Arts Festival in 1998. Tortelier concluded his ISO tenure in 2019.

Eva Ollikainen (2020–2026)

Eva Ollikainen first guest-conducted the ISO in 2005. She returned as guest conductor with the ISO on three occasions between 2007 and 2010, and once again in February 2019. In June 2019, the ISO announced the appointment of Ollikainen as its next chief conductor and artistic advisor, effective with the 2020–2021 season, with an initial contract through 2024. Ollikainen is the first female conductor to be named chief conductor of the Iceland Symphony Orchestra. In April 2024, the orchestra announced that Ollikainen is to conclude her tenure as its chief conductor at the close of the 2025-2026 season.

Barbara Hannigan (2026–)

In 2022, Barbara Hannigan first-guest conducted the ISO. In May 2024, the ISO named her its next chief conductor and artistic director, effective in 2026, with an initial contract of three years.

=== Vladimir Ashkenazy ===
Vladimir Ashkenazy became an Icelandic citizen in 1972, eleven years after marrying Icelandic piano player Þórunn Jóhannsdóttir. He was one of the main instigators of Reykjavik Arts Festival which was held for the first time in 1970. Ashkenazy collaborated with the ISO for the first time as soloist on 19 December 1971 and for the first time as conductor on 12 October 1972. He conducted the orchestra fourteen times during the next six years, but in September 1978, an interview was published in Gramophone where Ashkenazy described the players of the ISO as "semi-professionals". In the interview, Ashkenazy even made the following expression when speaking about the players of the ISO: "Sometimes they produce interesting musical performances but technically they are not very good. You have to treat them as children." The comment was harshly received by members, organizers and spokesmen of the ISO. Helga Hauksdóttir, chairman of the ISO's company union, expressed her disappointment in an interview with Morgunblaðið where a strong sense of dissension can be noted: "If Vladimir Ashkenazy wants to compare the ISO with the world’s first-rate orchestras, we must be allowed to reply in the same spirit and compare his talents as conductor with some of the excellent conductors who have worked with us during the last few years. Even if he has improved since his first attempts with the ISO some years ago, I’m sure most of the orchestra’s players agree that he is nowhere near being a first-class conductor."

Ashkenazy moved to Switzerland in 1978, around the same time as his disagreement with the ISO became public. He did not collaborate with the ISO for over twenty years, but on 18 January 2001, he conducted the orchestra for the first time after the long break. During the same time, Ashkenazy praised the ISO in interviews, declaring that the orchestra had made great improvements during the last years. Since 2001, Ashkenazy has conducted the ISO annually. In April 2002, he was appointed conductor laureate of the ISO and has held the position since. On 4 My 2011, he conducted the orchestra for the first time at the inaugural concert of Harpa Concert Hall.

In January 2020 Ashkenazy announced his retirement from conducting. Ashkenazy has conducted the ISO on three recorded albums.

=== Conductors in Residence ===
In 2018, the orchestra established an Assistant Conductor position, later expanded into a Conductor in Residence role, to support longer-term collaboration with selected young conductors.

- Bjarni Frímann Bjarnason (2018-2021)
- Kornilios Michailidis (2021-2022)
- Nathanaël Iselin (2022-2023)
- Ross Jamie Collins (2023-2024)

== Recordings ==
The ISO has participated in 87 published albums, both under its own name and accompanying other artists. The first album recorded by the ISO was Prokofiev's Peter and the Wolf, conducted by Václav Smetácek and narrated by Helga Valtýsdóttir, in 1956. The impression, however, was mysteriously lost and the recording has since remained unheard. Seven years passed until ISO recorded its second album which included "Minni Íslands" ("Theme of Iceland") by Jón Leifs and Symphony no. 16, "Icelandic", by Henry Cowell. The orchestra had premiered Cowell's symphony on 21 March 1963 and recorded it later the same year. The composition was dedicated to the memory of explorer Vilhjálmur Stefánsson with whom Cowell had maintained friendship since 1941, and since his Symphony no. 16 includes motifs from Icelandic folk melodies, he considered the ISO an ideal performer for the piece.

Jón Leifs is the single composer whose works have been recorded most often by the ISO, spanning twelve albums in all. The first major work was The Saga Symphony, recorded in 1975 and conducted by Jussi Jalas. Jalas had conducted the orchestra several times in concert and served as its first-ever guest conductor on 27 June 1950. The Saga Symphony was recorded again in 1996 and conducted by Osmo Vänska. Between 1996 and 2002 the orchestra recorded many of Leifs’ most important works, including Geysir, Hekla, Hafís and Baldr. En Shao conducted Hekla and Dettifoss, both rare performances were recorded.

The ISO's visibility in the international music industry escalated in the 1990s under Petri Sakari's command. Sakari conducted the orchestra in various recordings for Chandos Records in 1992–1996, as well as conducting the complete symphonies by Jean Sibelius for Naxos Records in 1996-2000 (published as a box set in 2001). Collaboration with Chandos Records continued during Rumon Gamba's period as principal conductor, resulting in a two-volume recording of the orchestral works of Malcolm Williamson (published in 2006–2007) and a six-volume recording of the orchestral works of Vincent d’Indy (published in 2008–2015). The first volume of the d’Indy-series was nominated for a Grammy award for Best Orchestral Recording in 2009 and the second volume was chosen as Gramophone's Editor Choice.

The Iceland Symphony has a comprehensive profile on Spotify where most of its recordings can be found.

== Harpa Concert Hall ==
For decades, the prospect of building a specialized venue for major classical concerts was discussed publicly in Iceland. No real concert halls existed in Iceland during the 20th century, and classical concerts typically took place in churches, theaters, and sports halls. Háskólabíó, ISO's venue from 1961, was designed and intended as a movie theater, and no measures were taken during its construction towards making it a locale for classical concerts. Conductors and musicians who performed in Háskólabíó remained unsatisfied with the building's acoustics from the beginning, even if some improvements were made, e.g. by installing large panels on the walls of the theater's main hall.

During the 1980s, public enthusiasm for building a proper music hall increased considerably. The initiative came from entrepreneurs and academics no less than from musicians. On 15 May 1983, an article by building contractor Ármann Örn Ármannsson appeared in Morgunblaðið, deploring the lack of a venue for symphony concerts in Iceland. Ármannsson proposed the establishment of an organization of those interested in paving the way for a concert hall. Three weeks later, on 4 June 1983, an inaugural meeting of the advised organization took place in Háskólabíó. The organization was simply entitled Association towards building a concert hall (Samtök um byggingu tónlistarhúss; SBT) and was prominent on the cultural scene during the next years. Two years later, the SBT was allocated a building site in Laugardalur, east of Reykjavík's city center, where the anticipated concert hall was supposed to rise. An architectural competition was held in 1986 in which a first prize was given to architect Guðmundur Jónsson, who completed his blueprints in 1988. At the award ceremony in 1986, hopes were expressed that the concert hall should become ready for use in 1990. Discussions of the future concert hall were supplemented with a subordinate debate on whether the building should be fit for opera staging as well as symphony concerts. The ISO had been the main point of reference for the concert hall from the start but opera lovers wanted their share as well.

A number of international artists gave SBT financial support in its efforts to build a concert hall in Iceland. On 26 February 1985, The Philharmonia Orchestra played in a benefit concert, conducted by Vladimir Ashkenazy, in Royal Festival Hall in London and donated all the income to SBT. According to organizers, the concert raised $1,260. Classical pianist Martin Berofsky, who lived in Iceland from 1982 to 1987, held a series of recitals in the US, donating the profits to the project of building a concert hall in Iceland. Berofsky's first recital in the cycle took place at Harvard on 19 October 1986.

Aspirations for building a concert hall in Iceland persisted through the 1990s. Several politicians expressed their ability and willingness to realize the dream, but they failed to produce any tangible results. In 2000, the current location of Harpa was chosen as a building site. In May 2003, Vladimir Ashkenazy heavily criticized the tardiness of Icelandic politicians at a meeting with the ISO and declared that he would "probably find it difficult to travel from the cemetery to conduct the orchestra". That same year, the company Austurhöfn-TR was specifically founded to supervise the construction of the concert hall.

In 2005, Portus Group, owned by Landsbanki Íslands, signed a contract to build and operate the concert hall. During this time, the idea had been expanded and modified with the intention of making the building multipurpose – a concert and conference complex. Construction of the building began on 12 January 2007. During the 2008 financial crisis, construction work came to a halt, but was started anew in March 2009.

Harpa Concert Hall was formally opened on 4 May 2011 with an inaugural concert of Iceland Symphony Orchestra under Vladimir Ashkenazy.

== Notable performances ==
Date	Accompanying artist	Repertoire
29 March 1951	Aram Khachaturian (conductor)	Aram Khachaturian: Ode in Memory of Lenin, The Battle of Stalingrad, Masquerade Suite, Gayane Suite Pyotr Tchaikovsky: Serenade for String Orchestra op. 48
14 September 1954	Mstislav Rostropovich	Antonín Dvořák: Cello Concerto op. 104
19 March 1964	Alfred Brendel	Ludwig van Beethoven: Piano Concerto no. 4
5 June 1964	Vladimir Ashkenazy (first performance with ISO)	Ludwig van Beethoven: Piano Concerto no. 1 Sergei Rachmaninov: Piano Concerto no. 3
29 May 1966	Wilhelm Kempff	Robert Schumann: Piano Concerto in a minor op. 54
29 September 1966	Claudio Arrau	Johannes Brahms: Piano Concerto no. 1 op. 15
29 June 1970	Daniel Barenboim (conductor), Itzhak Perlman	Ludwig van Beethoven: Overture to The Creatures of Prometheus op. 43 Pyotr Tchaikovsky: Violin Concerto in D major op. 35 Ludwig van Beethoven: Symphony no. 7 op. 92
9 June 1972	Yehudi Menuhin	Ludwig van Beethoven: Violin Concerto
13 May 1976	Emil Gilels	Ludwig van Beethoven: Piano Concerto no. 5
14 June 1982	Ivo Pogorelich	Fréderic Chopin: Piano Concerto no. 2
16 November 1985	Anne-Sophie Mutter	Antonio Vivaldi: The Four Seasons op. 8 no. 1-4 Joseph Haydn: Symphony no. 104 in D major
14 April 1988	Mischa Maisky	Richard Strauss: Don Quixote
2 June 1990	Andrei Gavrilov	Sergei Rachmaninov: Rhapsody on a Theme of Paganini op. 43
26 September 1992	Russell Powell	Alan Hovhaness: Cello Concerto, Op. 17
16 March 1995	Grigory Sokolov	Fréderic Chopin: Piano Concerto no. 2
1 and 2 October 2014	Evgeny Kissin with conductor Vladimir Ashkenazy	Sergei Rachmaninov: Piano Concerto no. 2

== Collaboration with popular musicians ==
On 19 November 1978, the ISO teamed up with pop musician Gunnar Þórðarson, former frontman and main songwriter of Thor's Hammer. The concert marks the beginning of ISO's association with the popular music industry. In 1986, an album entitled Í takt við tímann ("In keeping with the times") where the ISO performed a selection of Icelandic pop classics. Since 2002, ISO has regularly performed with pop musicians in concert, often recording and publishing the results on CD. The following list demonstrates the main bands and artists who have been associated with the ISO in concert:

- 2001: Quarashi
- 2002: Sálin
- 2003: Todmobile
- 2004: Nýdönsk
- 2006: Björgvin Halldórsson
- 2007: Dúndurfréttir
- 2008: Lady and Bird
- 2009: Gunnar Þórðarson
- 2010: Hjaltalín
- 2010 and 2011: Páll Óskar Hjálmtýsson
- 2011 and 2012: Sigurður Guðmundsson and Sigríður Thorlacius
- 2013: Skálmöld (Skálmöld & Sinfóníuhljómsveit Íslands), Ólafur Arnalds
- 2015: Eivør Pálsdóttir
- 2016: Emiliana Torrini, John Grant (musician)
- 2018: Skálmöld
- 2023: Laufey (A Night at the Symphony)
