= Eva Ollikainen =

Finnish conductor (born 1982)

- Born: 12 February 1982 (age 44); Espoo, Finland
- Occupation: Conductor
- Organization(s): Iceland Symphony Orchestra, Reykjavík; Orchestra della Toscana, Florence

Eva Ollikainen (born 12 February 1982, Espoo) is a Finnish conductor.

In 2019, Ollikainen was appointed chief conductor and artistic director of the Iceland Symphony Orchestra, in a four-year contract to commence with the 2021 season.

== Early life and education ==
Ollikainen began piano studies at the age of 3, and also learned the violin and French horn. She started conducting studies at the age of 12. She attended the Sibelius Academy from 1994 to 2002 and graduated in 2002 with a Master of Music degree in piano. She studied conducting with Jorma Panula and Leif Segerstam. Ollikainen has been a member of the Finnish contemporary ensemble Uusinta, and has premiered several works by Finnish composers.

== Career ==
In 2003, Ollikainen won the second Jorma Panula Conductors' Competition. She first guest-conducted the Iceland Symphony Orchestra in 2005. In the summer of 2006, she was a Tanglewood Music Center conducting fellow, the only fellow that year who already had agency representation. She returned as guest conductor with the Iceland Symphony Orchestra on three occasions between 2007 and 2010, and once again in February 2019.

In June 2017, Sweden's Nordic Chamber Orchestra (Nordiska Kammarorkestern) announced the appointment of Ollikainen as its next chief conductor, effective for the 2018–2019 season, with an initial contract of three seasons. This appointment marked Ollikainen's first chief conductorship, and she is the first female conductor to be named to this post.

In June 2019, the Iceland Symphony Orchestra announced the appointment of Ollikainen as its next chief conductor and artistic advisor, effective for the 2020–2021 season, with an initial contract through 2024. According to the contract, she was involved in at least four weeks during the season at the Harpa Concert Hall, and involved with international tours. Ollikainen was the first female conductor to be named ISO chief conductor. In November 2019, Orchestra della Toscana in Florence also announced the appointment of Ollikainen as its next principal conductor, the first female conductor to be named to the post, effective for the 2020–2021 season.

Cultural offices
Preceded by Christian Lindberg	Chief Conductor, Nordic Chamber Orchestra; 2018–2021	Succeeded by vacant
Preceded by Daniele Rustioni	Principal Conductor, Orchestra della Toscana; 2020–2023	Succeeded by Diego Ceretta
Preceded by Yan Pascal Tortelier	Principal Conductor, Iceland Symphony Orchestra; 2020–2026	Succeeded by Barbara Hannigan
