= Okon Fuoko =

Ballet-pantomime in one act by Leevi Madetoja

- Ballet-pantomime by Leevi Madetoja
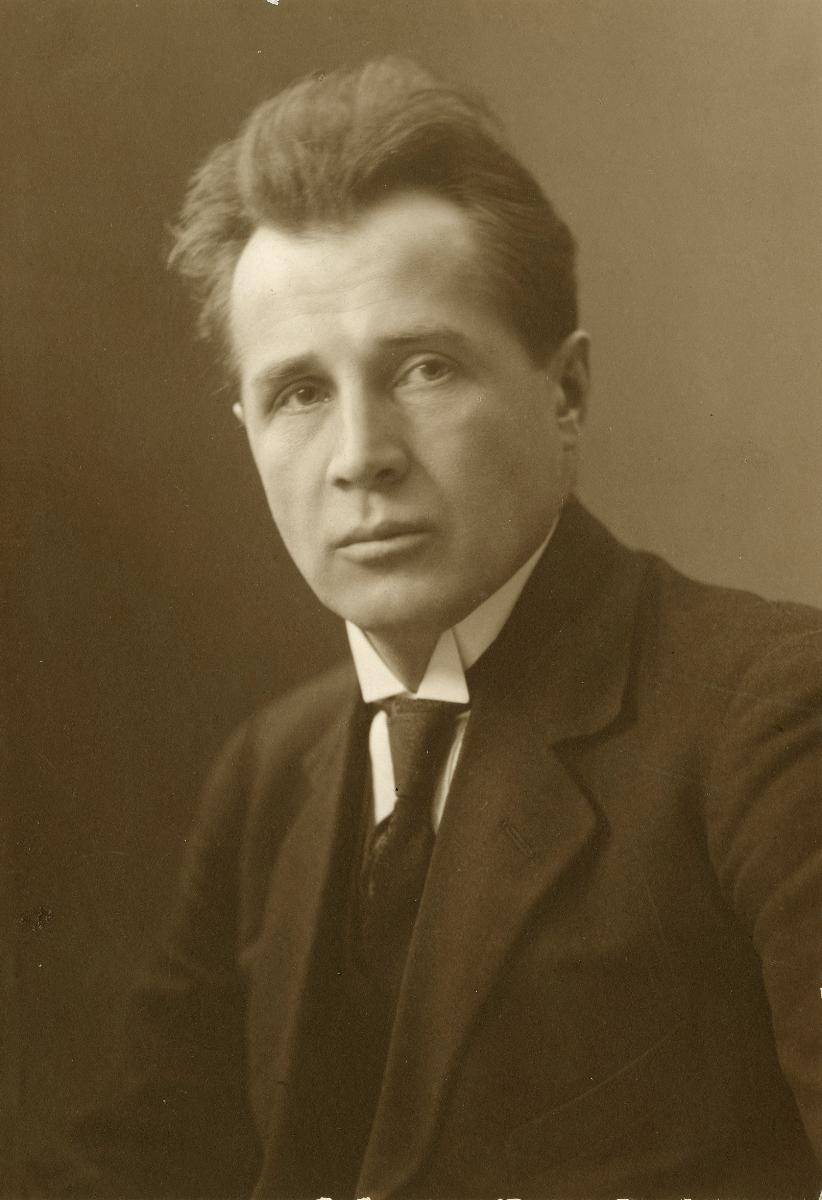
- The composer (c. 1925)
- Opus: 58
- Text: Poul Knudsen
- Composed: 1925–1927
- Duration: Approx. 77 minutes
- Movements: 1 act

Premiere
- Date: 12 February 1930
- Location: Helsinki, Finland
- Conductor: Martti Similä
- Performers: Finnish National Opera

Okon Fuoko, Op. 58, is a ballet-pantomime for orchestra, vocal soloists, and choir by the Finnish composer Leevi Madetoja, who wrote the piece from 1925–27 concurrent with the composition of his Third Symphony. The Japonisme-influenced libretto is by Danish playwright Poul Knudsen. The story takes place in ancient Japan and, similar to Coppélia, centers around the (successful) efforts of the eponymous puppet-maker to bring a female creation to life. The result is a tragic love-triangle between the seductive doll, the infatuated Okon Fuoko, and his devastated wife. With its unique and exotic musical language, Okon Fuoko is one of Madetoja's "finest" scores; indeed, the last of his "masterpieces".

Scheduling the ballet-pantomime's premiere in Copenhagen proved difficult and the production languished unperformed until 12 February 1930, when it received its premiere in Helsinki at the Finnish National Opera under the baton of Martti Similä. Although critics praised Madetoja's music, they panned Knudsen's awkward libretto as a dramatic failure. As a result, the inaugural stage production received only three performances and thus marked the first setback of Madetoja's career, the previous major works of whom—three symphonies and an opera—the critics had received enthusiastically.

Today, the work is better known in its abridged form, a six-movement suite for orchestra that Madetoja excerpted from the stage production's score. The composer's plans for an additional two suites never materialized, although in 2009, Estonian conductor Arvo Volmer pieced together a collection of eight remaining numbers from the original score, dubbed Okon Fuoko Suite II. Volmer, conducting the Oulu Symphony Orchestra, also has produced the only recording of the complete score.

== History ==
While on his way to Paris in 1925, Madetoja had met a music publisher from Copenhagen, Wilhelm Hansen, who placed him into contact with the Danish playwright Poul Knudsen. A libretto for a new ballet-pantomime, based upon "exotic" Japanese themes, was on offer and Madetoja accepted the project with alacrity. In fact, the libretto was first offered to Jean Sibelius, who had earlier collaborated with Knudsen on the ballet-pantomime Scaramouche, Op. 71. (1913; fp. 1922). Sibelius, however, was at the time deep into the composition of his Sixth Symphony and thus refused the project.

Having outlined his plan for the new commission while staying in Houilles, Madetoja more or less composed the Third Symphony and Okon Fuoko simultaneously, although the pressure to complete the former was so great that he was compelled to place the ballet-pantomime aside until December 1926. Although Madetoja completed the score in late 1927, scheduling the ballet-pantomime's premiere in Copenhagen proved difficult, despite the enthusiasm of the chief conductor of the Royal Danish Orchestra, Georg Høeberg, who after a test rehearsal had proclaimed the score a "masterpiece". The primary cause of the delay appears to have been the difficulty of casting a lead actor, as the part required both singing and miming; Knudsen insisted upon—and opted to wait for—an actor then on leave from the theatre, Johannes Poulsen.

The production languished unperformed until it (finally) received its premiere on 12 February 1930, not in Copenhagen but rather in Helsinki, at the Finnish National Opera under the baton of Martti Similä. The performance was the first significant setback of Madetoja's career: although the critics "unanimously praised" Madetoja's music, the consensus opinion was that Knudsen's libretto—with its awkward mixture of song, melodramatic spoken dialogue, dance, and pantomime—was a dramatic failure. In the end, Okon Fuoko received only three performances total and the Danish premiere never took place.

== Structure ==
=== Complete score ===
- Scenes 1–3: Okon Fuoko Paints Umegava's Face
- Scenes 3–4: Okon Fuoko Plays to Umegava
- Scenes 6–7: The Chorus' Song
- Scene 8: Umegava Stops Smiling
- Scene 8: Yiai's Song I
- Scene 8: Okon Fuoko and Yiai Recall Their Early Love
- Scene 8: Yiai's Song II
- Scene 8: Yiai Tells of a Dream
- Scene 9: The Guests Arrive I
- Scene 10: The Tea Ceremony
- Scene 11: Puppet Dance I: Geishas and Warriors
- Scene 11: Puppet Dance II: Woman and Man
- Scene 12: Puppet Dance III: Old Man, Woman, and Young Warrior
- Scene 13: Puppet Dance III: Enter Six Old Men
- Scene 14: Hara-kiri
- Scene 15: The Guests Converse
- Scene 16: The Guests Arrive II
- Scene 16: Okon Fuoko's Recitative
- Scenes 16–17: Yiai Shows the Guests Umegava
- Scene 17: Umegava's Mechanical Dance
- Scene 18: The Guests Converse
- Scene 18: Okon Fuoko's Dance to Umegava
- Scenes 18–20: The Chorus' Song
- Scene 20: Yiai Dances
- Scene 21: Night Falls
- Scenes 21–22: Umegava Comes to Life
- Scene 22: Okon Fuoko's and Umegava's Dance I
- Scene 22: Okon Fuoko's and Umegava's Dance II
- Scene 23: The Storm
- Scenes 23–24: Umegava Dances Yiai's Dance
- Scene 24: Umegava's Seductive Dance
- Scenes 25–27: Umegava Picks Up the Sword
- Umegava's Demonic Dance (Sword Dance)
- Scene 28: Puppet Dance IV: The Storm and Okon Fuoko's Death
- Scenes 28–31: Yiai's Song I
- Scenes 31–33: Okon Fuoko Dies

=== Suite I ===
1. Okon Fuoko, unitaikuri (The Dream Magician)
2. Vieraat saapuvat (Entrance of the Guests)
3. Nukkien tanssi (The Dance of the Dolls)
4. Miehen tanssi (Man's Dance)
5. Naisen tanssi (Woman's Dance)
6. Danse grotesque

=== Suite II ===
1. Nukketanssi: Vanhus, nainen ja soturi (Puppet Dance; Old Man, Woman, and Warrior)
2. Umegavan mekaaninen tanssi - Okon Fuokon tanssi Umegavalle (Umegava's Mechanical Dance - Okon Fuoko's Dance To Umegava)
3. Umegava tanssi Yiain tanssin (Umegava Dances Yiai's Dance)
4. Umegavan viettelevä tanssi (Umegava's Seductive Dance)
5. Miekkatanssi (Sword Dance)
6. Myrsky (The Storm)
7. Nukketanssi: Nainen ja mies (Puppet Dance: Woman and Man)
8. Okon Fuokon kuolema (Okon Fuoko's Death)

== Discography ==
Conductor	Orchestra	Recorded	Duration	Label
Okko Kamu	Finnish Radio Symphony Orchestra	1971	13:07	Finlandia (FACD 015)
Petri Sakari	Iceland Symphony Orchestra	1991	13:42	Chandos (CHAN 9036)
Jukka-Pekka Saraste	Finnish Radio Symphony Orchestra	1994	12:39	Finlandia (825646616329)
Arvo Volmer	Oulu Symphony Orchestra	2000	12:47	Alba Records (ABCD 156)
John Storgårds	Helsinki Philharmonic Orchestra	2013	13:40	Ondine (ODE 1211-2)

Overall, the critics have received Okon Fuoko favorably. In his review of Volmer’s recording of the complete ballet-pantomime, Fanfare’s Phillip Scott notes that in the score the typically-nationalistic Madetoja "[resists] any temptation to whip up excitement," instead utilizing an orchestra "pared back to the barest essentials" and embracing a sound world that is "cool", "stark", and "emotionally detached". Nevertheless, Scott finds that Okon Fuoko "weaves a powerful, cumulative spell", its "beguiling … gentle, pentatonic melodies" aided by Volmer’s "thoughtful … beautifully recorded" performance, and finishes by giving the disc a favorable recommendation. The American Record Guide's Jack Sullivan also applauds Volmer's massive undertaking, describing Madetoja's "hypnotic" score as having "melody aplenty and attractive harmony", although he finds the score's "subtlety and delicacy" to be its "most striking" feature. Indeed, with music that is "by turns rapturous, pungent, and tragic," Sullivan concludes that a listener could be forgiven for wondering how on earth Okon Fuoko has been neglected for so long.

== See also ==
- List of ballets by title

== Notes, references, and sources ==
=== Sources ===
Books

- Rickards, Guy (1997). Jean Sibelius. London: Phaidon. ISBN 9780714835815.
- Salmenhaara, Erkki (1987). Leevi Madetoja (in Finnish). Helsinki: Tammi. ISBN 951-30-6725-4.

CD liner notes

- Louhikko, Jouko (2005). Leevi Madetoja: Okon Fuoko, the Complete Ballet Pantomime Music (booklet). Arvo Volmer & Oulu Symphony Orchestra. Tampere, Finland: Alba. p. 21. ABCD 184.
- Häyrynen, Antti (2004). Madetoja Orchestral Works 5: A Sea of Star (booklet). Arvo Volmer & Oulu Symphony Orchestra. Tampere, Finland: Alba. p. 10–13. ABCD 211.
- Salmenhaara, Erkki (1992a). Madetoja, L.: Symphony No. 3, The Ostrobothnians Suite, Okon Fuoko Suite (booklet). Petri Sakari & Iceland Symphony Orchestra. Colchester, England: Chandos. p. 4–7. CHAN 9036.
