= Bleuse =

Bleuse is a French surname. Notable people with the surname include:

- Marc Bleuse (born 1937), French musician, composer, and conductor
- Pierre Bleuse (born 1977), French violinist and conductor
- Raoul Bleuse (1895–1984), French politician
