= Poul Knudsen (writer) =

Danish writer

Poul Knudsen (9 November 1889 – 30 April 1974) was a Danish writer. Knudsen worked on symbolistic and exotic themes. He collaborated with Finnish composers Jean Sibelius in 1911 on the tragic ballet-pantomime, Scaramouche, and with Leevi Madetoja in 1927 on a second ballet-pantomime, Okon Fuoko. The premieres of each production, however, were delayed and, upon being premiered, Knudsen was faulted for weak libretti.

== Okon Fuko ==
Okon Fuko is Japanese-themed ballet in one act by Knudsen and Leevi Madetoja. Knudsen provided the libretto and Madetoja composed the music.

Madetoja had been introduced to Knudsen's work probably by Wilhelm Hansen. Madetoja might have met Knudsen while in Copenhagen in 1925.

After composing Okon Fuko for two years, Madetoja sent the score to Knudsen in Copenhagen. Georg Høeberg conducted the score for a rehearsal and was very pleased with it, calling it a masterpiece. The Royal Danish Theatre had promised Knudsen that Okon Fuko would be staged in the form of pantomime as soon as it was ready. Encouraged by the positive feedback, Knudsen hoped Okon Fuko would be someday staged in Paris as well. In his letter to Madetoja outlining his plans for Okon Fuko, Knudsen enclosed another libretto for a new opera, hoping Madetoja would compose it, too. Madetoja, however, was still waiting for Okon Fuko to be premiered and was not interested in a new project. Okon Fuko's premier was delayed despite being given the go-ahead by the Royal Danish Theatre, because a suitable lead actor could not be cast. Knudsen insisted on Johannes Poulsen playing the lead role, but Poulsen was on a leave from the theatre. Kundsen opted to wait until Poulsen would return. Meanwhile, Knutsen's ambition knew and he envisioned – in addition to Paris – staging in London, and Germany, and even a making a film, but Madetoja did not agree with his plans. After all, the two had agreed to split the profits half-and-half for shows abroad but two-thirds to Madetoja and one third for Knudsen for performances in Finland. In the end, Okon Fuko was agreed to be premiered in Finland. Knudsen hoped positive reviews there would advance his cause in Denmark.

Okon Fuko was finally premiered in the Finnish Opera on 12 February 1930. Critical reception was unenthusiastic, and many Finnish critics preferred to blame Knudsen rather than Madetoja for the work's weaknesses. The drama of the play in particular was criticized, and because Madetoja did not agree to Knudsen's request to compose it in the form of an opera, he is partly to blame. About a year later, Knudsen still wanted more audiences for Okon Fuko and wrote to Madetoja presenting his plans. Knudsen wanted to publish the work in Germany, with the partiture abridged and with additional music, but received little encouragement from Madetoja. Still in 1935 Knudsen approached Madetoja: chances of the play ever being staged at the Royal Danish Theatre seemed bleak, and the challenge of finding an actor who could sing and mime as well, remained an obstacle for performances elsewhere as well. Knudsen thus proposed that Okon Fuko should be adapted as an opera instead.

Knudsen and Madetoja's ways parted in 1937. Plans to stage Okon Fuko in Dortmund had failed, but Knudsen presented two new librettos for Madetoja to compose: an opera based on a theme by E. T. A. Hoffmann, and a ballet that was originally to be composed by Carl Nielsen who had died suddenly. In the end, Okon Fuko was performed only thrice in Finland and never abroad.

== Other works ==
Knudesn also made a libretto for Jean Sibelius' Scaramouche.

While Okon Fuko was still without a premiere, Madetoja agreed to compose music for Knudsen's new play Les masques de la vie et de la mort for the Royal Danish Theater, but Madetoja never finished this task.
