= Scaramouche (Sibelius) =

Ballet-pantomime in two acts by Jean Sibelius

- Ballet-pantomime by Jean Sibelius
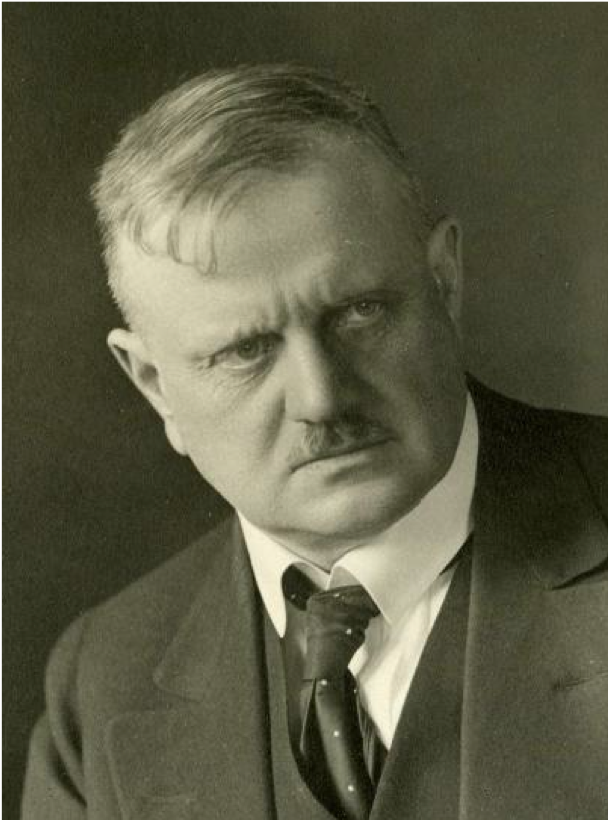
- Sibelius in middle age (c. 1915)
- Opus: 71
- Text: Libretto by Poul Knudsen
- Composed: 1912–1913
- Publisher: Edition Wilhelm Hansen (1918)
- Duration: Approx. 67 minutes

Premiere
- Date: 12 May 1922
- Location: Royal Danish Theatre; Copenhagen, Denmark
- Conductor: Georg Høeberg
- Performers: Royal Danish Orchestra

Scaramouche, Op. 71, is a tragic ballet-pantomime in two acts—comprising 21 scenes—written from 1912 to 1913 by the Finnish composer Jean Sibelius. The project, which was a collaboration with the Danish playwright Poul Knudsen, caused Sibelius great anguish—primarily because he had not understood that, when signing the commissioning contract, he was committing himself to the composition of an hour-long, full-length score. Scaramouche premiered in Copenhagen on 12 May 1922 at the Royal Danish Theatre with Georg Høeberg conducting the Royal Danish Orchestra and Johannes Poulsen originating the title role; Sibelius was not in attendance. Despite the quality of its musical material—critics at the premiere, for example, praised Sibelius's nuanced score for its sense of drama, noting that "it bears the imprint of genius"—the piece, due to the weakness of Knudsen's scenario, never established itself in the repertory and is rarely performed today.

== History ==
=== Composition ===
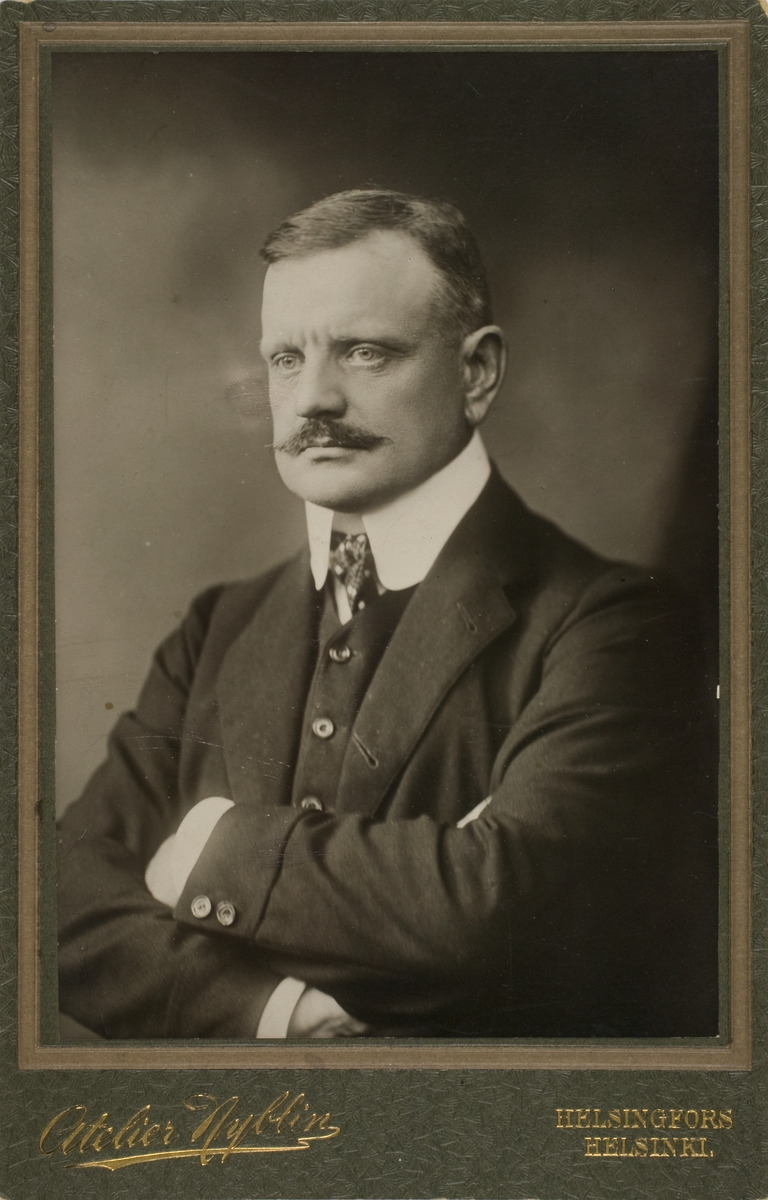
Jean Sibelius (c. 1913) struggled with the Scaramouche commission, writing in 1913: "I've completely ruined things for myself by signing... My nerves are in a terrible state."

In the autumn of 1912, the Danish music publisher Wilhelm Hansen commissioned Sibelius to compose incidental music to accompany a new pantomime by the Danish playwright Poul Knudsen. Sibelius agreed to the proposal, a decision he came to regret: he mistakenly had believed Hansen would require from him a handful of dance movements; only later at the end of 1912, did Sibelius realize he was to provide an hour-long, full-length ballet-pantomime. Attempts to annul the contract or to amend it to his liking proved unsuccessful.

Further disappointment arrived when Sibelius obtained Knudsen's libretto, which he criticized as having "virtually plagiarized" the Austrian playwright Arthur Schnitzler's Der Schleier der Pierrette (The Veil of Pierrette), a pantomime in three acts for which the Hungarian composer Ernst von Dohnányi had recently provided the incidental music (Op. 18, 1908–9). Sibelius's request to Hansen that Knudsen find a different scenario went unheeded. Furthermore, and uncommonly for a pantomime, the libretto contained spoken dialogue, which Sibelius feared would undermine the effect of his music. Hansen assured the composer that the dialogue was there merely to coach the actors and would be excised for the premiere—a promise that went unfulfilled. According to passages from his diary, Sibelius found it difficult to compose the new work and worried "that his international reputation was at stake":

I've completely ruined things for myself by signing the Scaramouche contract. Was in such a temper about it today that I smashed the telephone. My nerves are in a terrible state. What is left for me now? Nothing! I have allowed myself to be weighed down by one stupidity after another.

— Jean Sibelius, in a 21 June 1913 diary entry

Despite his frustration, Sibelius completed the score in late 1913, dispatching the manuscript to Hansen on 21 December with the note: "To get it right has cost me much thought and work. In the form it now takes, I believe it will be successful".

=== Performances ===
The first performance of Scaramouche took place at the Royal Danish Theatre in Copenhagen on 12 May 1922, nearly a decade after Sibelius had completed the project; he refused to attend the premiere. Georg Høeberg conducted the Royal Danish Orchestra, with Johannes Poulsen serving as performance director, as well as the titular character, Scaramouche. The Norwegian ballerina Lillebil Ibsen created the role of Blondelaine. The role of Leilon was created by Svend Methling, while the role of Gigolo was portrayed by "Hr. [likely Holger?] Gabrielsen". The Copenhagen critics savaged the production, faulting Knudsen's libretto as "crude[ly]" derivative of Schnitzler and the use of spoken dialogue as "totally out of place". Sibelius, however, emerged unscathed: the critics praised his incidental music for having elevated the pantomime. Tawaststjerna paraphrases the review in Berlingske Tidende:

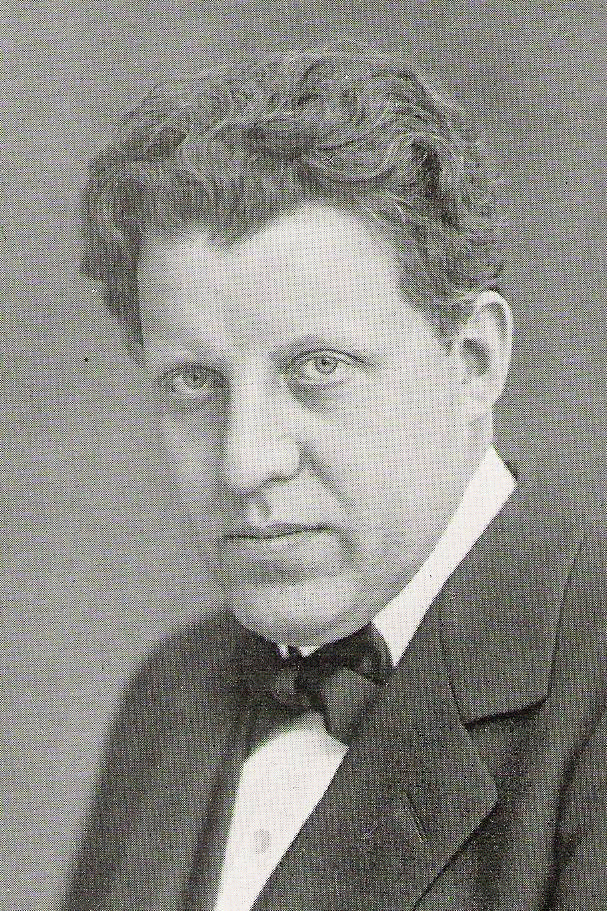
Danish conductor Georg Høeberg premiered Sibelius's Scaramouche in Copenhagen on 12 May 1922.

The inspiring element of the performance, which justified the enterprise, was and remained the music. [The main theme of Scaramouche is] music's suggestive power [over the human psyche. Sibelius's score is] rich in invention, of radiant fantasy and an unaffected, heart-warming lyricism. With a small orchestra... he achieves the greatest effect. A masterpiece from beginning to end.

— Music critic for Berlingske Tidende, in a 13 May 1922 review of Scaramouche

The review in Politiken was similarly complimentary, describing the score as having displayed "the resourcefulness and unscrupulous power of the great Finnish master... [the music contains a] refinement almost verging on perversity... it bears the imprint of genius". After reading the favorable reviews in Helsinki, Sibelius, in a positive mood, wrote in his journal: "Scaramouche in Copenhagen was a great success".

== Synopsis ==
=== Act 1 ===
The story takes place entirely at the House of Leilon, the master of which is holding a ball. As a minuet plays, Leilon's wife, the beautiful Blondelaine, enters the room and reproves her husband for never dancing; to emphasize her point, she dances a bolero before the assembled guests. Music coming from outside the house interrupts the festivities: Scaramouche, a hunch-backed dwarf clad in black, plays the viola, with his traveling companions (a boy in yellow with a flute and a woman in scarlet with a lute) providing accompaniment. Leilon invites the newcomers in to continue the bolero, to which Scaramouche agrees, hoping to seduce Blondelaine with his hypnotic playing. To her husband's embarrassment, as well as the amazement of the guests, Blondelaine dances with abandon to the music, which becomes quicker and more demonic in color; in her delirium, she drops the bunch of flowers that she had been holding. Jealous, Leilon expels Scaramouche and his troupe from the house. As his own musicians play a waltz, Leilon returns to Blondelaine the bouquet she had dropped and she begins to regain her composure. As Leilon and company depart for dinner, Blondelaine hears Scaramouche's viola playing; possessed, she runs outside, again dropping her bouquet. Upon returning for his wife, Leilon finds the discarded flowers and drops to his knees, sobbing.

=== Act 2 ===
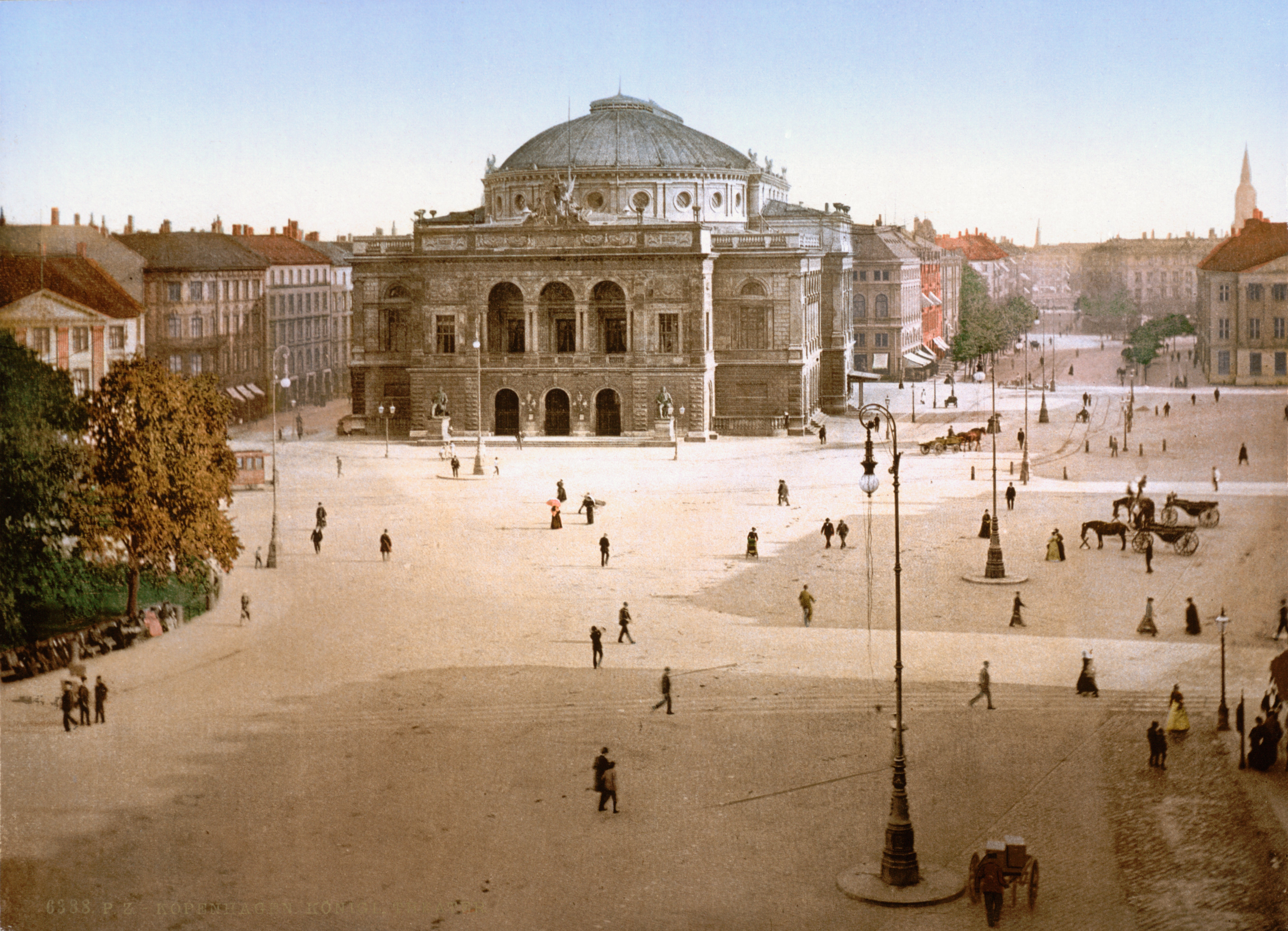
Royal Danish Theatre (c. 1900) in Copenhagen, Denmark, at which Sibelius's Scaramouche premiered

The curtain rises to find a melancholy Leilon seated with Gigolo, who tells his friend that Blondelaine will never return to him—better, instead, to forget her. Gigolo borrows Leilon's dagger to open a bottle of wine and, upon leaving, places the blade on the table. To Leilon's relief, Blondelaine returns, but her disheveled state unnerves him: what might Scaramouche have done to her? His wife confesses that, hypnotized by the hunchback's playing, she has no memory of where she has been or of what has happened. Losing his temper, Leilon drives his dagger into the table, which prompts Blondelaine to assure him of her faithfulness. After a loving embrace, Leilon exits to fetch more drink, leaving Blondelaine alone. As she looks at herself in a mirror, Scaramouche returns to kidnap her, reminding her of all she had said while in his arms. Concealing her husband's dagger, Blondelaine tells Scaramouche that she will follow him willingly. As they reach the door, she stabs her tormentor to death with the knife and hides his body behind the curtains. Leilon returns in a good mood and Blondelaine, seeking to calm herself, asks him to play the piano for her. He performs the minuet from act 1 while Blondelaine dances. The revelry ends when she notices Scaramouche's blood trickling out from under the curtains and hears his viola—clearly inside her head—calling her from afar. Frightened, she dances herself to death, falling lifeless next to the body of Scaramouche. The shock drives Leilon insane.

== Orchestration ==
Scarmouche is scored for the following instruments:

- Woodwinds: 2 flutes, 2 oboes, 2 clarinets (in B♭), and 2 bassoons
- Brass: 4 horns (in F) and cornet (in B♭; used for the signaling calls in act 2, scene 5)
- Percussion: timpani, tambourine, and triangle
- Strings: violins, violas (including soloist), cellos (including soloist), double basses, and piano

Sibelius divides the instrumentalists spatially into three groups: first, the musicians onstage who serve as background characters in the play; second, a solo viola, supported by solo cello, offstage that provides Scaramouche's bewitching tune; and third, the orchestra proper, the role of which is to "comment" on the unfolding drama. (According to Hurwitz, the "crucial" spatial "interplay" between the groups is "lost" when recorded.) Notably for a Sibelius composition, the incidental music to Scaramouche does not employ trumpet or trombone. Barnett argues that such "modest" scoring thus permits the composer to "depict the mysterious, supernatural allure of Scaramouche with restraint... the orchestration is sensitive, with a transparency akin to chamber music." Davidson similarly describes the orchestration as "at once erotic and sensuous, light and charming".

== Structure ==
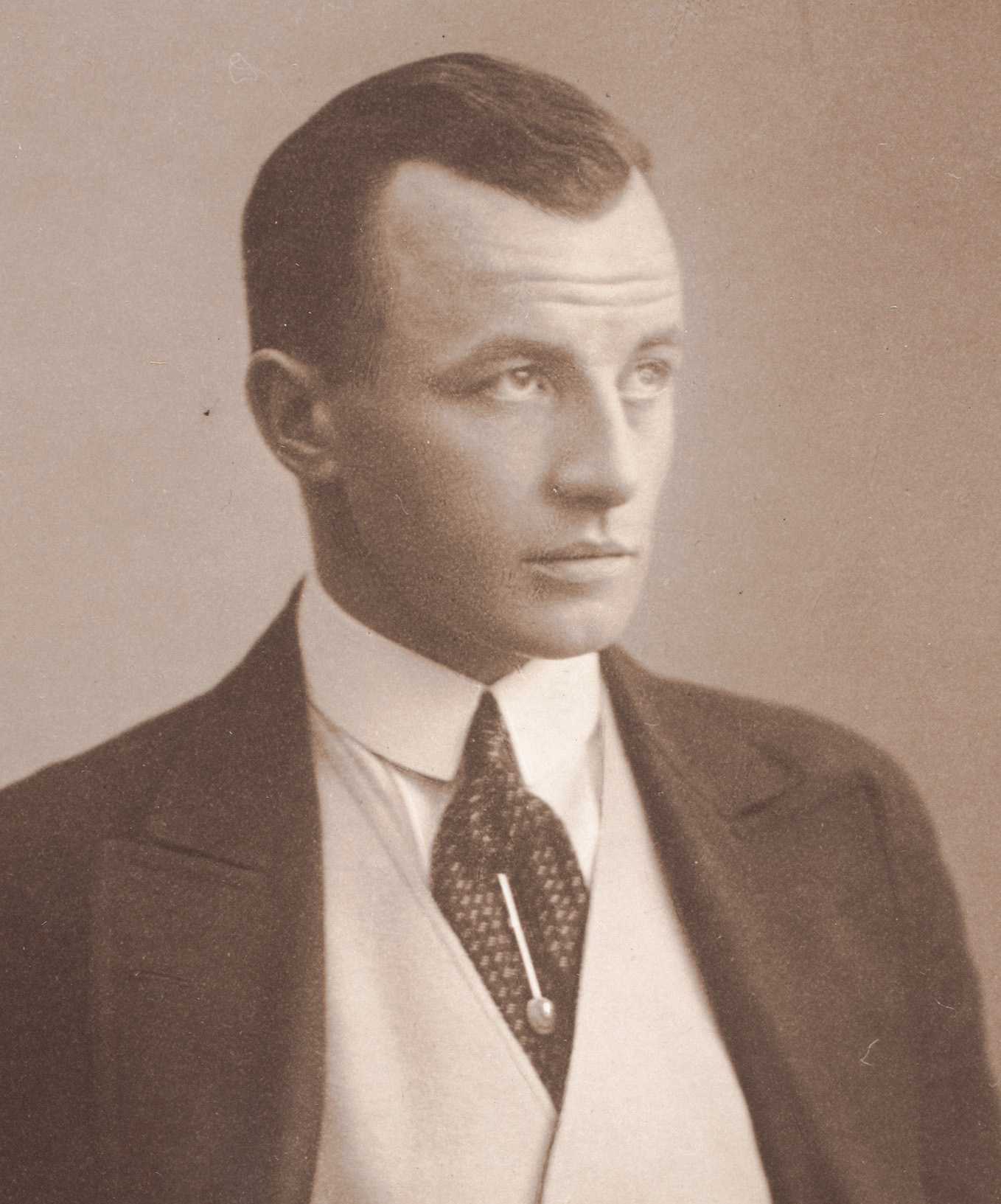
Danish stage actor Johannes Poulsen originated the role of Scaramouche at the 12 May 1922 premiere.

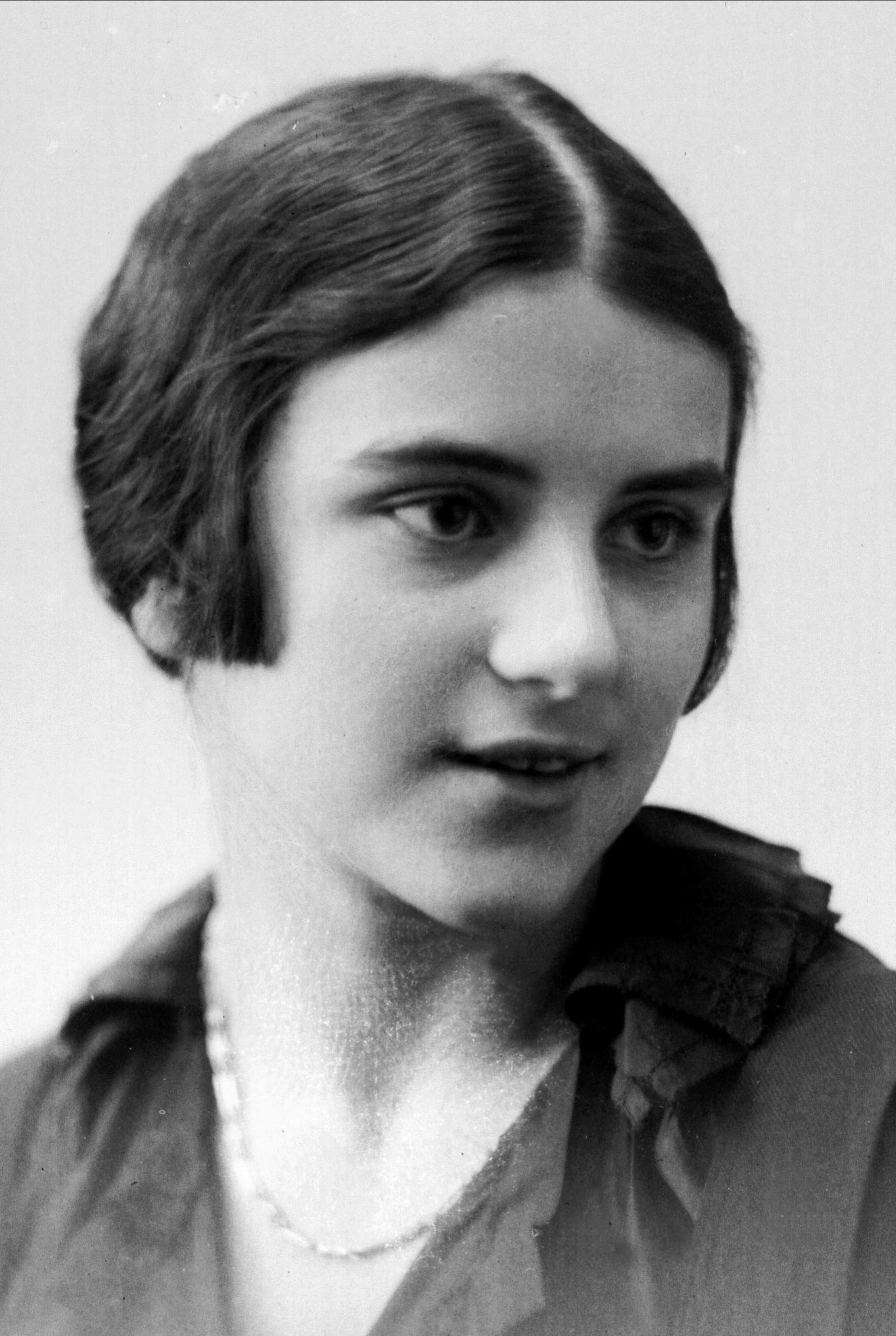
The Norwegian ballerina Lillebil Ibsen originated the role of Blondelaine at the 12 May 1922 premiere.

Scaramouche, which Sibelius referred to as a "mimic drama", is in two acts, comprising ten and eleven scenes, respectively. The piece is played without pause between acts or numbers, making it Sibelius's longest continuous score. As such, according to Rickards, it is more accurate to conceptualize the music as an "integral element of the drama" rather than "incidental" to it.

Act 1
- Scene 1: Lento assai
- Scene 2: (Lento assai)
- Scene 3: (Lento assai)—Andante con moto
- Scene 4: Tempo di bolero
- Scene 5: Lento—Tempo di bolero—Lento assai
- Scene 6: Tempo di valse
- Scene 7: Poco moderato
- Scene 8: (Poco moderato)
- Scene 9: Tempo di valse
- Scene 10: Adagio—Allegro—Adagio
Act 2
- Scene 1: Meno tranquillo
- Scene 2: Allegretto
- Scene 3: Andantino
- Scene 4: Allegretto
- Scene 5: (Allegretto)—Andantino
- Scene 6: Tranquillo assai
- Scene 7: (Andantino)—Meno tranquillo—Lento—Moderato—Allegro moderato
- Scene 8: Allegretto—Allegro
- Scene 9: (Allegro)
- Scene 10: Andante—Lento assai—Andantino
- Scene 11: (Grave assai)

Unlike with his other works for theatre—for example, King Christian II (Op. 27, 1898), Pelléas et Mélisande (Op. 46, 1905), Belshazzar's Feast (Op. 51, 1906–07), Swanwhite (Op. 54, 1908), and The Tempest (Op. 109, 1925–27)—Sibelius never extracted from Scaramouche a concert suite, although in 1921 he considered doing so. Nevertheless, he remained "proud" of the "ethereal, other-worldly character" of the scoring; years later, when his son-in-law Jussi Jalas sought his consent to produce a concert suite, Sibelius required Jalas to preserve the original orchestration.

== Reception ==
Modern commentators have divided over the appropriateness of Scaramouche's relegation to obscurity. Robert Layton, for example, has written of the score's unevenness: "there are moments of genuine poetry and a wistful, gentle sadness that is both touching and charming... [this is music of] both distinction and vision"; but, he continues, much of act 2 is "thin" and "there are some passages deficient in real inspiration". Hurwitz is similarly ambivalent, although he focuses on the inseparability of music from libretto: "The problem isn't that the music is bad—far from it—but that it really is so closely tied to the action onstage... In the final analysis, Sibelius was probably correct simply to leave the piece alone and forget about concert performance".

== Discography ==
The sortable table below lists all commercially available recordings of the incidental music to Scaramouche. (The 1972 recording by Jalas with the Hungarian State Symphony Orchestra is not included, because it is of the so-called twenty-minute 'Scaramouche Suite' that Jalas excerpted, with Sibelius's permission, from the complete score.)

No.	Conductor	Orchestra	Viola solo	Cello solo	Rec. (Note: Refers to the year in which the performers recorded the work; this may not be the same as the year in which the recording was first released to the general public.)	Time	Recording venue	Label	Ref.
1	Neeme Järvi	Gothenburg Symphony Orchestra	Petra Vahle	Mats Levin	1990	64:57	Gothenburg Concert Hall	BIS	(Note: N. Järvi–BIS (CD–502) 1991)
2	Leif Segerstam	Turku Philharmonic Orchestra	Bendik Goldstein	Roi Ruottinen	2014	71:01	Turku Concert Hall	Naxos	(Note: L. Segerstam–Naxos (8.573511) 2015)

== Notes, references, and sources ==
Notes

Books

- Hurwitz, David (2007). Sibelius: The Orchestral Works, an Owner's Manual. Pompton Plains, New Jersey: Amadeus Press. ISBN 9781574671490.
- Johnson, Harold (1959). Jean Sibelius. New York: Alfred A. Knopf. OCLC 603128.
- Layton, Robert (1965). Sibelius: The Masters Musicians Series. New York: Schirmer Books. ASIN B0000CMRUD.
- Rickards, Guy (1997). Jean Sibelius. London: Phaidon. ISBN 9780714835815.
- Tawaststjerna, Erik (1986). Sibelius: Volume 2, 1904–1914. Translated by Robert Layton. London: Faber and Faber. ISBN 9780571247738.
- Tawaststjerna, Erik (1997). Sibelius: Volume 3, 1914–1957. Translated by Robert Layton. London: Faber and Faber. ISBN 9780571247745.

Liner notes

- Barnett, Andrew (1991). Scaramouche, Op. 71; Wedding March ('The Language of the Birds') (booklet). Neemi Järvi and Gothenburg Symphony Orchestra. BIS. pp. 3–7. BIS CD-502.
- Davidson, John (1974). Tempest Suites One and Two; Scaramouche (booklet). Jussi Jalas and Hungarian State Symphony Orchestra. London Records. CS 6824.
- Wells, Dominic (2015). Scaramouche: Complete Ballet (booklet). Leif Segerstam and Turku Philharmonic Orchestra. Naxos. pp. 2–3. 8.573511.

Score

- Edition Wilhelm Hansen (1918). Scaramouche (Sibelius): Scores at the International Music Score Library Project

== Additional reading ==
- Kurki, Eija (2020). "Scaramouche: Sibelius's Horror Story". SibeliusOne.com. Sibelius One.
