= Olaf Poulsen (actor) =

Danish comedic stage actor (1849-1923)

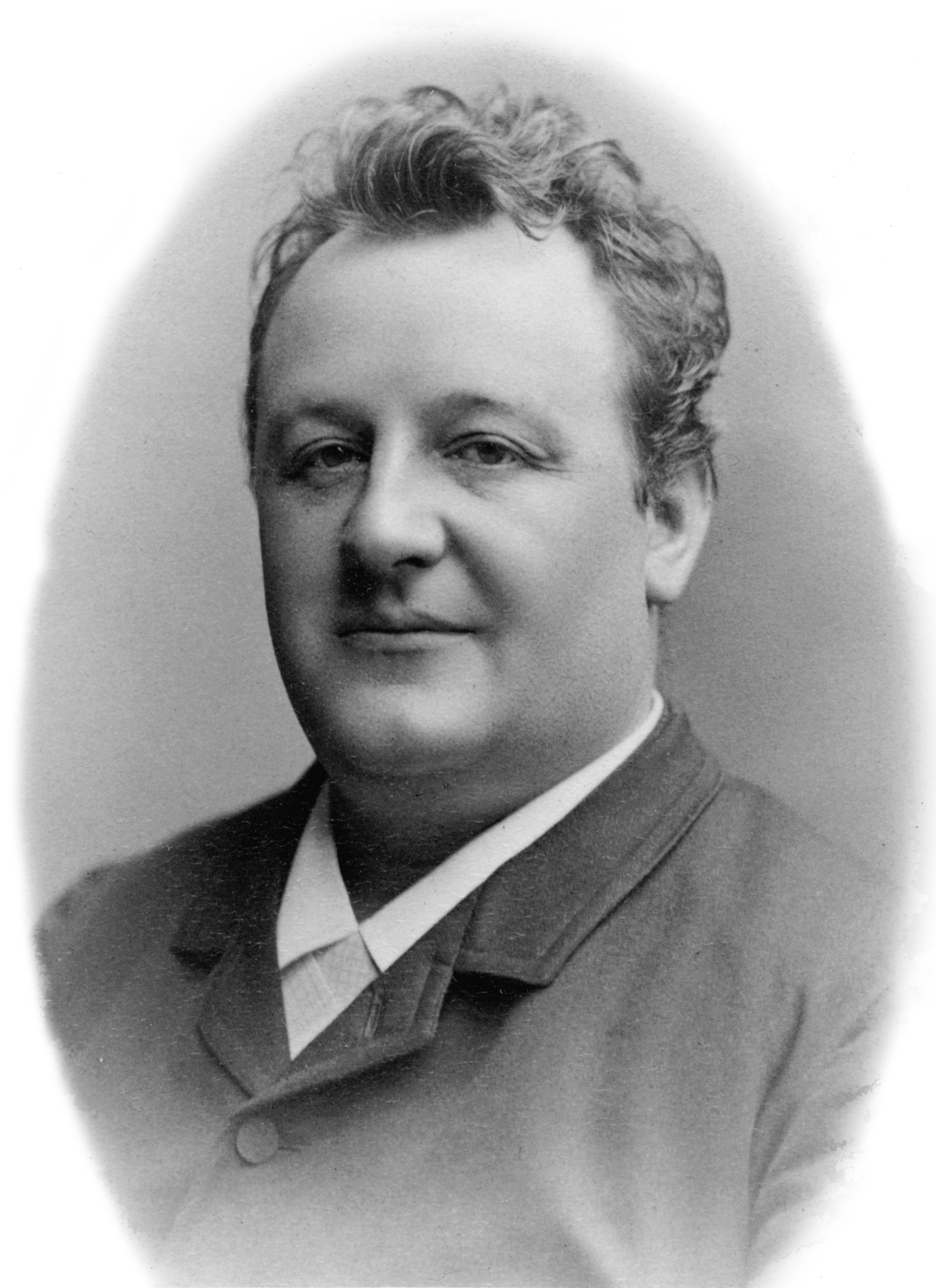
Olaf Poulsen

Olaf Poulsen (26 April 1849 – 26 March 1923) was perhaps the best-known Danish comedic stage actor of his time. He was famous for playing such roles as Nick Bottom in A Midsummer Night's Dream and Falstaff, among others for the Royal Danish Theatre. His performance as Old Ekdal in an 1885 production of Henrik Ibsen's The Wild Duck was particularly acclaimed. Olaf was by accounts an outsize personality, unafraid to insult wealthy or noble men even when insulting a man in public was a crime in Denmark. Five minutes of his improvisation on a 1913 film reel were described at the time as "the best film ever to leave a Danish factory."

Poulsen's brother Emil staged Royal Danish Theatre plays in addition to being an acclaimed dramatic actor. Poulsen was the uncle of actor and director Johannes Poulsen, who married the ballerina Ulla Iversen. He was the father of the stage and film actress Karen Poulsen (1881–1953).
