= Op. 58 =

In music, Op. 58 stands for Opus number 58. Compositions that are assigned this number include:

- Beethoven – Piano Concerto No. 4
- Bliss – Piano Concerto
- Britten – Songs from the Chinese
- Bruch – Violin Concerto No. 3
- Chopin – Piano Sonata No. 3
- Dvořák – Stabat Mater
- Glazunov – Symphony No. 6
- Madetoja – Okon Fuoko, ballet-pantomime for soloists, mixed choir, and orchestra (1927)
- Mendelssohn – Cello Sonata No. 2
- Milhaud – Le bœuf sur le toit
- Nápravník – Dubrovsky
- Nielsen – Commotio
- Prokofiev – Cello Concerto
- Saint-Saëns – Violin Concerto No. 2
- Schumann – Sketches for Organ or Pedal Piano (Skizzen für Orgel oder Pedalklavier)
- Strauss – Elektra
- Tchaikovsky – Manfred Symphony
