= Emil Poulsen =

Danish actor (1842–1911)

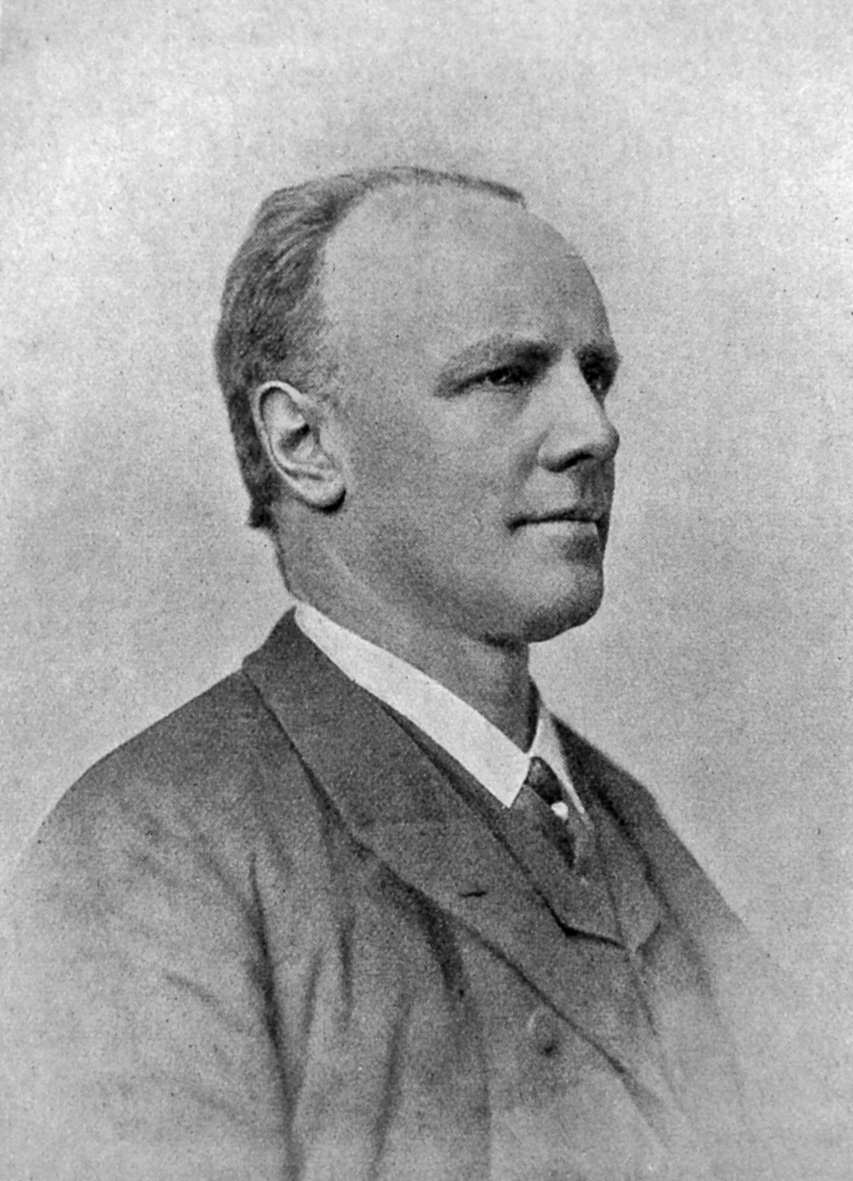
Emil Poulsen

Emil Poulsen (9 July 1842 - 8 June 1911) was a Danish actor and stage director. He was the leading male actor at the Royal Danish Theatre for three decades. He was the half brother of actor Olad Poulsen and the father of actors Johannes Poulsen and Adam Poulsen.

== Early life and education ==
Poulsen was born out of wedlock on 9 July 1842 to Sophus Danneskiold-Samsøe (1804–94) and Pouline Sophie Henckell (1819–88). His mother married to shoemaker and servant Hans Poulsen (1807–65).

== Career ==
Poulsen had his debut on 16 April 1867 at the Royal Danish Theatre as Erasmus Montanus. In 1893, he also started working as a stage director. He resigned from the Royal Danish Theatre in 1898. His last stage performance was on 4 November 1900

== Personal life ==
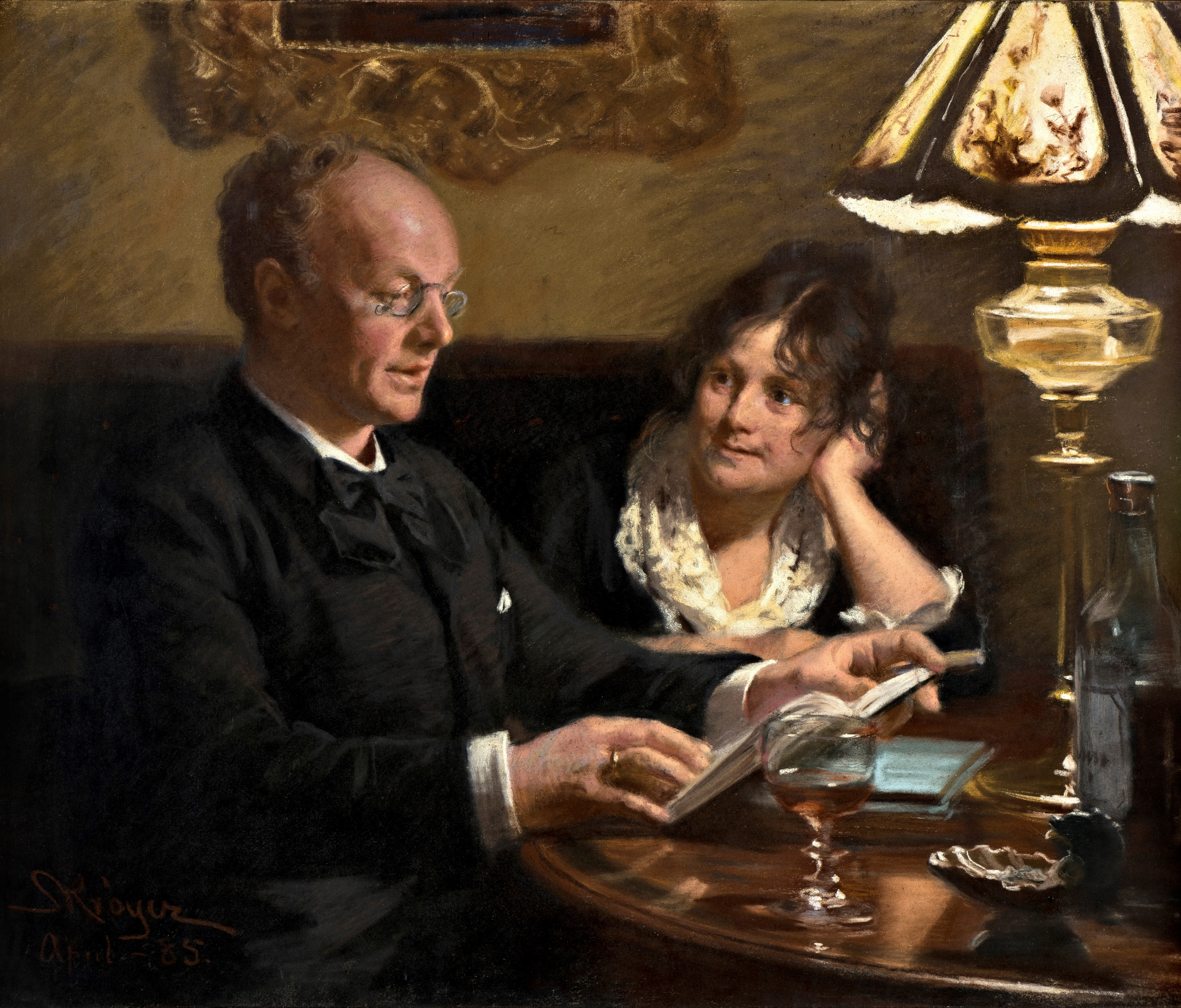
Emil and Anna Poulsen, painted by Peder Severin Krøyer

Poulsen was married twice. In 1930, he married Ane Cathrine Verner (c. 1811–40). On 17 August 1871, he was married to Anna Augusta Dorothea Winzentine Margrethe Næser (1849–1934). She was the daughter of captain in the Royal Danish Navy Johan August Kjerulff N. (1795–1857) and Winzentine Henriette Benedictine Albertine Kirkerup v. Schønberg (1809–83). They were the parents of actors Adam Poulsen and Johannes Poulsen and editor Svenn Poulsen.

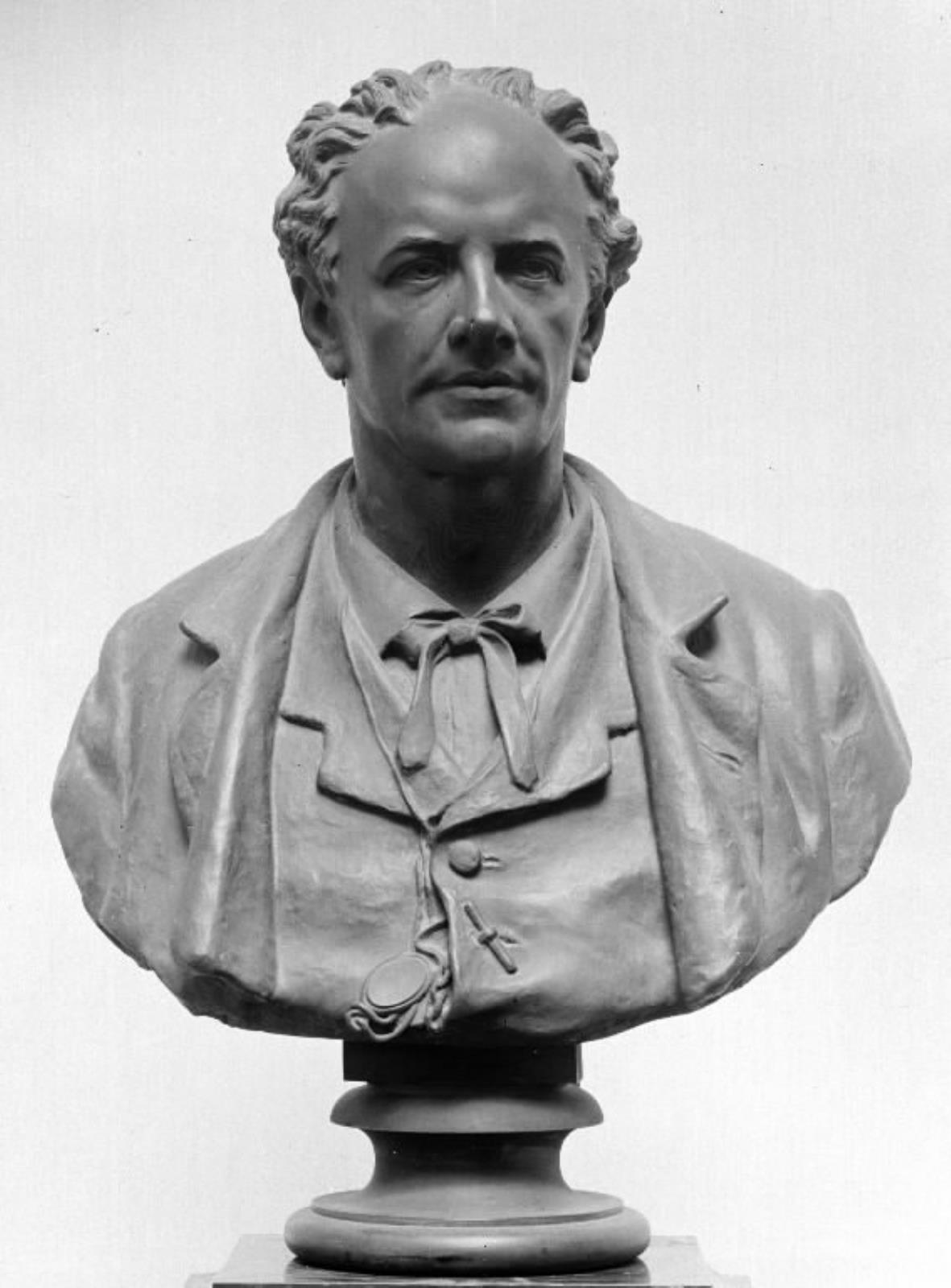
Bust of Emil Poulsen by Louis Hasselriis

Poulsen was created a Knight of the Order of the Dannebrog in 1878. He was awarded the Cross of Honour in 1898.

He died at Villa Ørnæs outside Helsingør on 8 June 1911. He is buried at Frederiksberg Old Cemetery.
