= Odense Symphony Orchestra =

Danish symphony orchestra

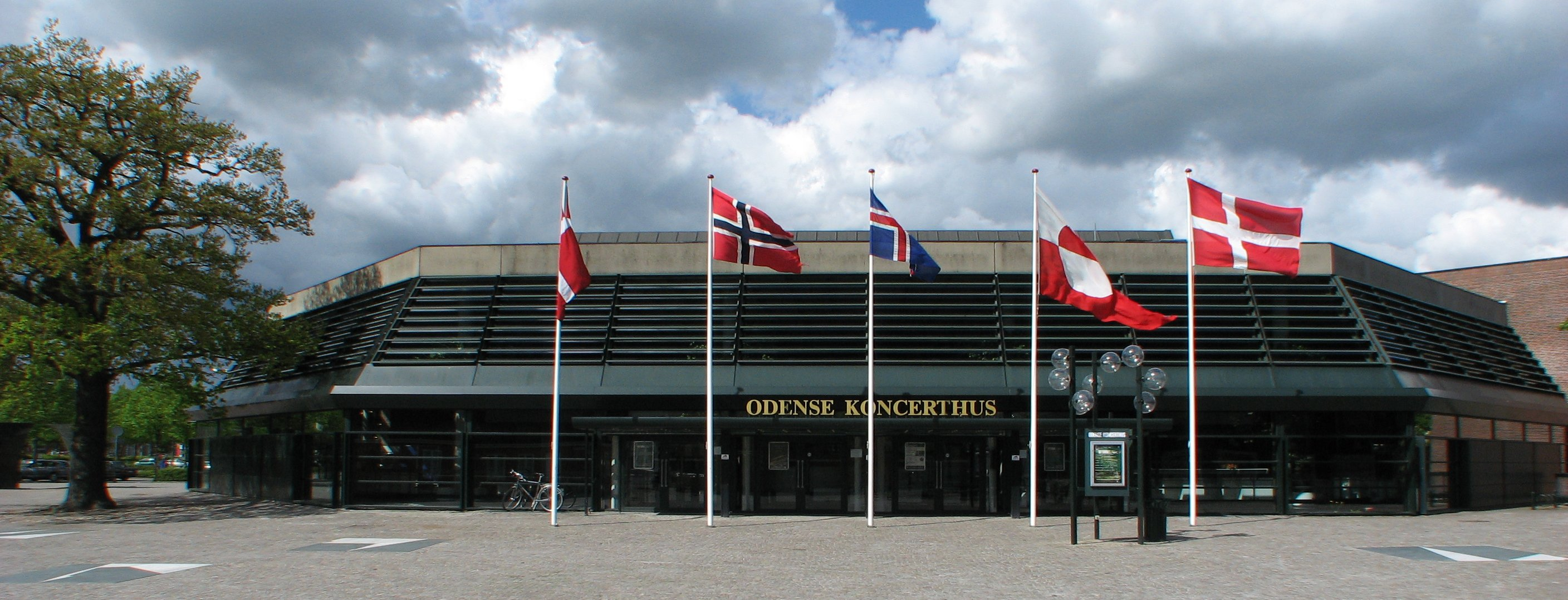
Odense Concert Hall

The Odense Symphony Orchestra (Odense Symfoniorkester) is one of Denmark’s five regional orchestras. The orchestra was founded in 1946, but its roots go as far back as around 1800. From being a theatre orchestra that also played symphonic music, the orchestra today appears as a modern symphony orchestra. The orchestra is based at the Odense Concert Hall, which opened in 1982. Most of its concerts are held in the Carl Nielsen Hall, a venue known for its excellent acoustics, seating for 1,212 people, and a 46-stop organ built by Marcussen & Søn, one of the world's leading organ makers. Its chief executive is Trine Boje Mortensen

== History ==
The precursor roots of the orchestra date to the early 19th century. The orchestra was established under its current name in 1946. The orchestra initially began with 22 musicians, as a theatre orchestra. The current orchestra numbers on the order of 73 permanent musicians and a high level of activity.

The orchestra's most recent chief conductor was Alexander Vedernikov, who served in the post from 2009 to 2018. Vedernikov now has the title of æresdirigent (honorary conductor) of the orchestra. In October 2019, Pierre Bleuse first guest-conducted the orchestra, and returned for an additional guest-conducting engagement in February 2020, as a substitute for Vedernikov. In April 2020, the orchestra announced the appointment of Bleuse as its next chief conductor, effective with the 2021–2022 season, with an initial contract of 3 seasons.

== Chief conductors ==
- Poul Ingerslev-Jensen (1946–1948)
- Arne Hammelboe (1948–1949)
- Martellius Lundqvist (1949–1967)
- Karol Stryja (1968–1984)
- Tamás Vetö (1984–1987)
- Othmar Mága (1987–1991)
- Edward Serov (1991–1995)
- Jan Wagner (1997–2002)
- Paul Mann (2005–2008)
- Alexander Vedernikov (2009–2018)
- Pierre Bleuse (designate, effective 2021)

== See also ==
- List of concert halls in Denmark
