= WDR Symphony Orchestra Cologne =

Symphony orchestra of Westdeutscher Rundfunk

- Radio orchestra
- Official logo
- Native name: WDR Sinfonieorchester Köln
- Former name: Kölner Rundfunk-Sinfonie-Orchester
- Founded: 1947; 79 years ago
- Location: Cologne, Germany
- Concert hall: WDR Funkhaus Wallrafplatz; Kölner Philharmonie
- Principal conductor: Marie Jacquot
- Website: Official website

YouTube information
- Channel: ARD Klassik
- Years active: 2019–present
- Genre: Classical music
- Subscribers: 498 thousand
- Views: 303 million
- Last updated: 25 September 2026

The WDR Symphony Orchestra Cologne (German: WDR Sinfonieorchester Köln) is a German radio orchestra based in Cologne, where the orchestra performs at two main concert halls: the WDR Funkhaus Wallrafplatz and the Kölner Philharmonie.

== History ==
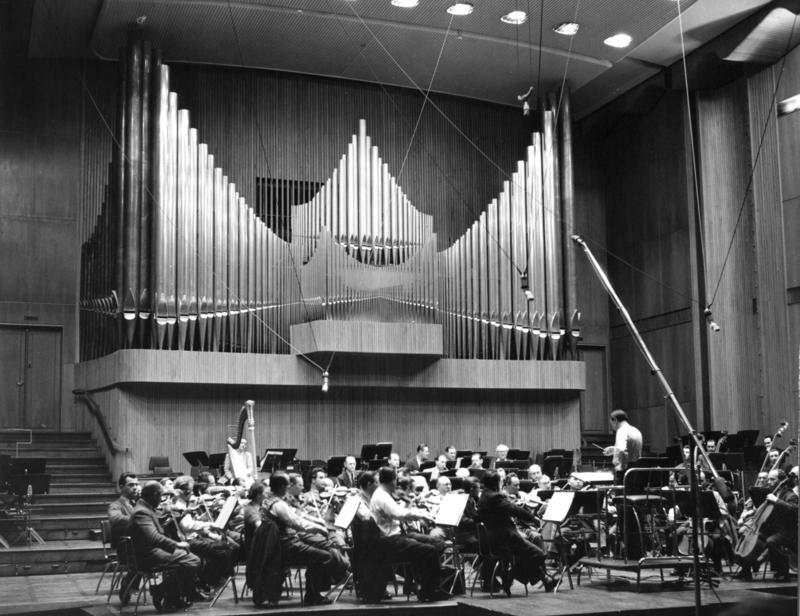
Rehearsal of the orchestra with Hans Rosbaud in the Großer Sendesaal (Great Hall) of the WDR, Cologne (1954)

The orchestra was founded in 1947 by Allied occupation authorities after World War II, as the orchestra of Nordwestdeutscher Rundfunk (NWDR; Northwest German Radio), with the name Kölner Rundfunk-Sinfonie-Orchester (Cologne Radio Symphony Orchestra). The orchestra became particularly known for its performances of 20th-century and contemporary music. It has commissioned and premiered works from such composers as Luciano Berio, Hans Werner Henze, Mauricio Kagel, Krzysztof Penderecki, Karlheinz Stockhausen and Bernd Alois Zimmermann.

For the first part of its history, the orchestra did not have a principal conductor, but worked with guest conductors. Christoph von Dohnányi was the first conductor to serve as the orchestra's principal conductor, from 1964 to 1969. In the 1990s, the orchestra changed its name to the WDR Sinfonieorchester (WDR Symphony Orchestra).

In February 2017, Cristian Măcelaru first guest-conducted the orchestra. He returned for three subsequent guest appearances with the orchestra. In May 2019, the orchestra announced the appointment of Măcelaru as its next chief conductor, effective with the 2019–2020 season, with an initial contract of 3 years. In June 2020, the orchestra announced an extension of Măcelaru's contract until July 2025. In October 2023, the orchestra announced that Măcelaru is to stand down as its chief conductor at the close of the 2024–2025 season, and to take the title of Artistic Partner for the 2025–2026 season.

In December 2022, Marie Jacquot first guest-conducted the orchestra. In January 2024, the orchestra announced the appointment of Jacquot as its next chief conductor, with effect from the 2026–2027 season, with an initial contract of 4 years. Jacquot is the first female conductor to be named chief conductor of the WDR Sinfonieorchester Köln.

The orchestra has recorded commercially for such labels as Avie, Hänssler, Kairos, CPO, and Wergo.

== Principal conductors ==
- Christoph von Dohnányi (1964–1969)
- Zdeněk Mácal (1970–1974)
- Hiroshi Wakasugi (1977–1983)
- Gary Bertini (1983–1991)
- Hans Vonk (1991–1997)
- Semyon Bychkov (1997–2010)
- Jukka-Pekka Saraste (2010–2019)
- Cristian Măcelaru (2019–2025)
- Marie Jacquot (2026–present)

== Venues ==
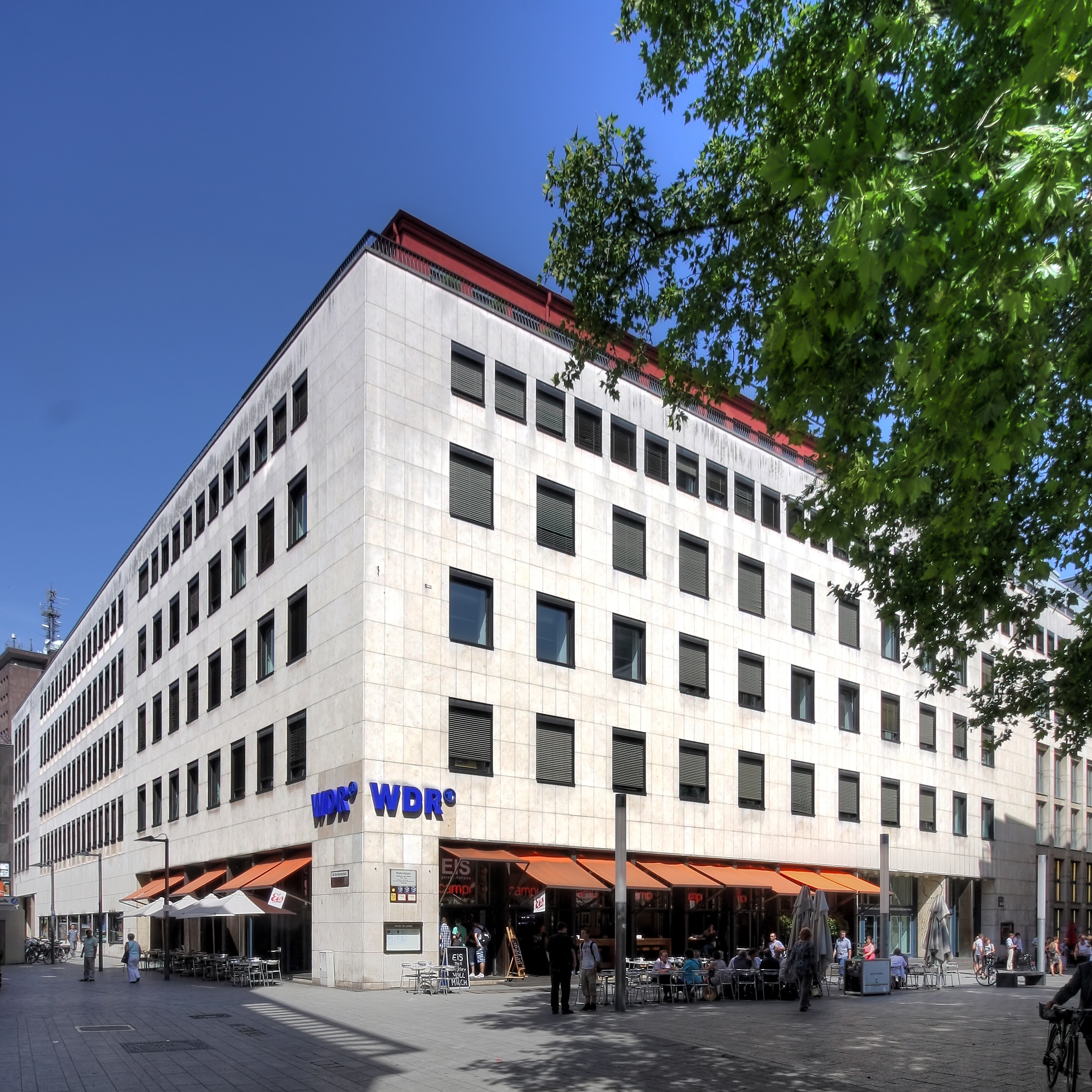
WDR Funkhaus Wallrafplatz, Cologne

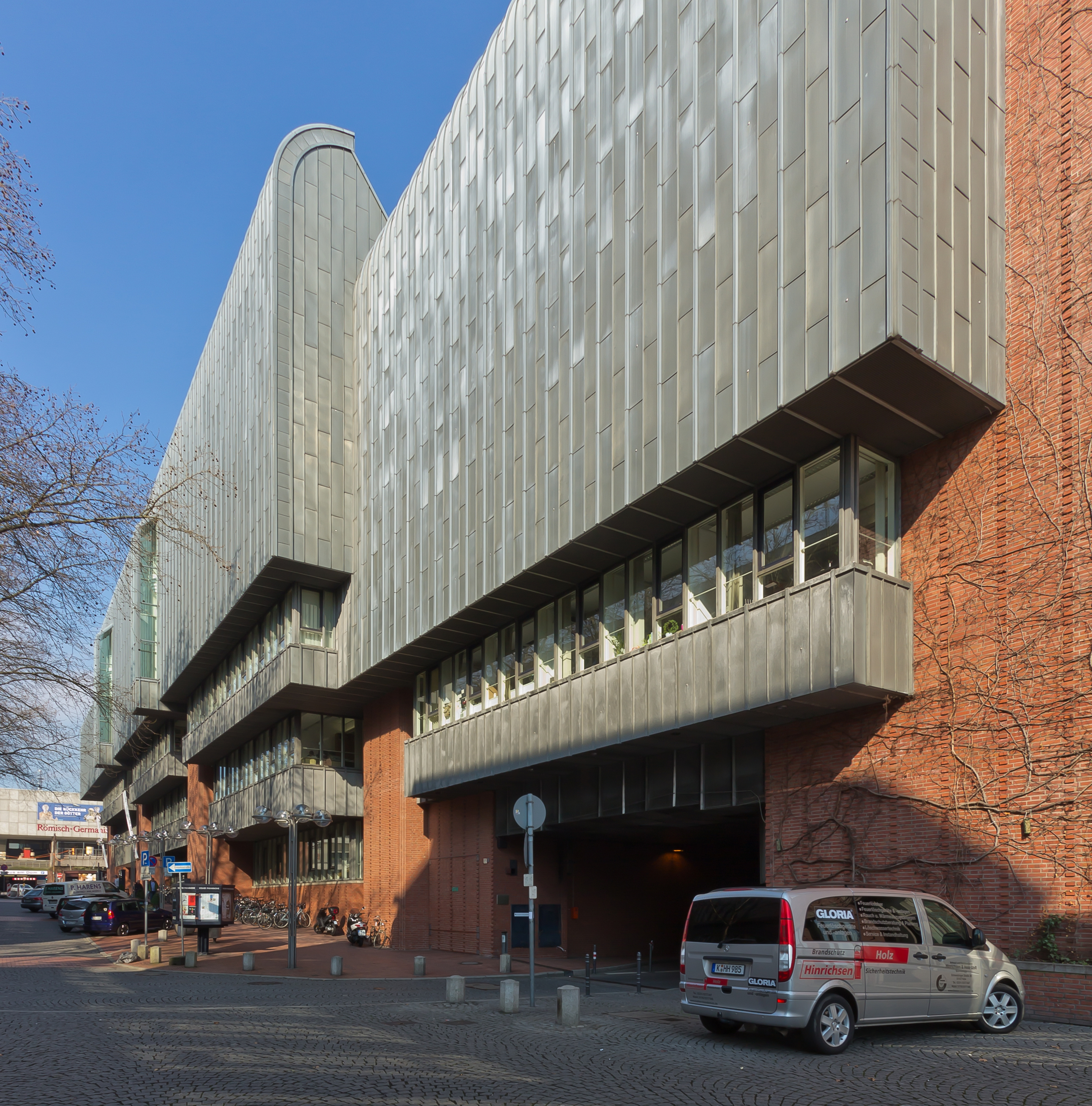
Kölner Philharmonie

== See also ==
- Studio for Electronic Music (WDR)
- WDR Funkhausorchester
- WDR Big Band
- WDR Rundfunkchor Köln
- Radio orchestra
- Category:Music commissioned by the WDR Symphony Orchestra Cologne (1)
