= Ensemble intercontemporain =

French chamber orchestra

- Chamber orchestra
- Official logo
- Founded: 1976
- Location: Paris, France
- Concert hall: Philharmonie de Paris
- Principal conductor: Pierre Bleuse
- Website: ensembleintercontemporain.com

The Ensemble intercontemporain (EIC) is a French music ensemble, based in Paris, that is dedicated to contemporary music. Pierre Boulez founded the EIC in 1976 for this purpose.

== Organization and purpose ==
The EIC consists of thirty one full-time soloists in various instruments. They exist to fill a need for musicians who can work with new playing techniques and composition styles prevalent in this kind of music. The Ensemble is resident at the Philharmonie de Paris, under its current artistic director Matthias Pintscher. with their activities financed by the French Ministry of Culture and the city of Paris.

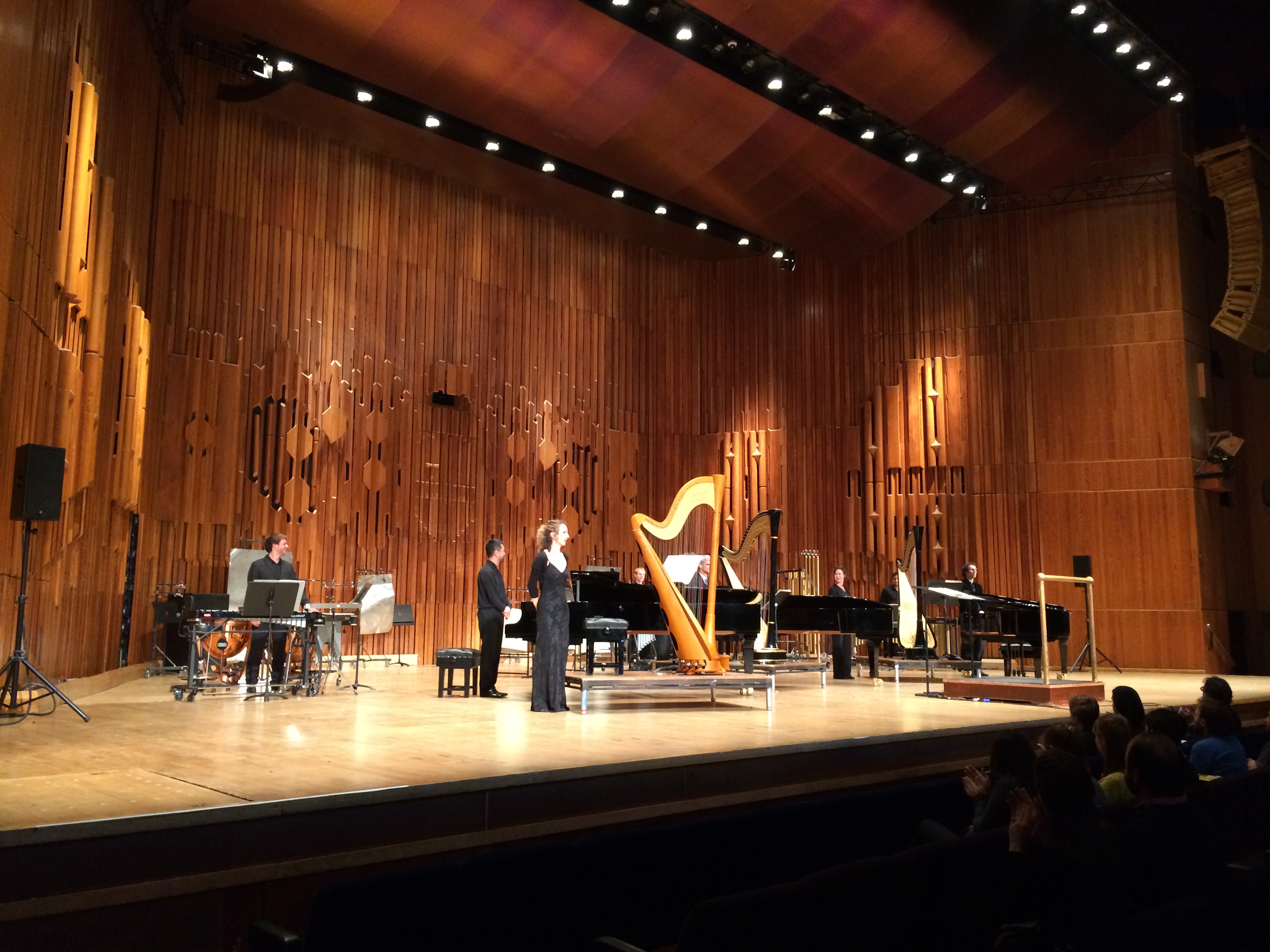
The Ensemble intercontemporain after a performance of Boulez' Sur Incises in Barbican Hall, London, April 2015

The EIC performs about thirty times a year in their home city, and tour extensively both in France and abroad, especially at international festivals. These concerts regularly include the premieres of new compositions, often commissioned by the Ensemble itself, which gives preference to young composers who have not yet had their work performed by the organization. The Ensemble has over 2,000 contemporary works in their repertoire, much of which has been recorded and includes composers such as Elliott Carter, Luigi Dallapiccola, Luciano Berio, along with the complete works of Boulez, György Ligeti, György Kurtág, Alejandro Romero, George Benjamin, Roberto Carnevale and Ivan Fedele.

Their support for composers goes beyond playing their work in public and includes collaborating with composers both in the creation and interpretation processes. One reason for this is that the techniques and composition style of contemporary music is significantly different from classical music, and composer notation systems vary, especially with the indications of these new techniques.

The Ensemble also supports young musicians which includes workshops at schools, master classes and more for conservatory students, professional and amateur musicians and training for conductors and composers. Since 2004, individual members have been tutoring young instrumentalists, conductors and composers in contemporary music as part of the Lucerne Festival Academy (Lucerne Festival). In addition, they collaborate with other kinds of artists from the fields of dance, theater, video and visual arts. The organization collaborates regularly with the Institut de Recherche et Coordination Acoustique/Musique (Institute of Acoustic Music Research and Coordination) which sponsors research and concerts to showcase technological innovations in composition.

== History ==
The Ensemble intercontemporain was founded in 1976 by composer and conductor Pierre Boulez, with the support of French Minister of Culture Michel Guy and the collaboration of Nicholas Snowman, in order to provide performers for contemporary chamber music.

The idea for the Ensemble came from Boulez's experiences as part of the historical avant garde of Darmstadt, Germany, in the 1950s, contemporary of Stockhausen, Berio, Ligeti and Nono. He began his career as a composer in contemporary music, moving onto conducting orchestras such as New York Philharmonic (1971–1978) and the BBC Symphony Orchestra (1971–1975). He states that his first love is composition and noted the lack of venues to premiere and promote new music, so he created the Ensemble for playing and producing music, along with IRCAM, Institut de recherche et coordination acoustique/musique for academic work into the same field.

Since 1995 the Ensemble has been based at the Cité de la Musique (itself part of Philharmonie de Paris from 2015). Boulez held the position of president, with Péter Eötvös becoming the first musical director, appointed by Boulez in 1979. Successive music directors of the EIC have been David Robertson (1992–2000), Jonathan Nott (2000–2003), Susanna Mälkki (2006–2013) and Matthias Pintscher (2013–2023). Mälkki was the first female music director of the EIC. Pintscher is scheduled to conclude his tenure as EIC music director at the close of the 2022–2023 season. In December 2021, the EIC announced the appointment of Pierre Bleuse as its next music director, effective with the 2023–2024 season, with an initial contract of 4 years.

The Ensemble has toured extensively to South America, Russia, Canada, the United States, Japan, New Zealand, Australia, and most major cities of Europe. Recent performances include the National Autonomous University of Mexico and the Palacio de Bellas Artes (2007), Buenos Aires in 2012, the Festival Internacional Cervantino in 2014, and in honor of Pierre Boulez's 90th birthday, a concert at the Barbican Centre in London.

The EIC has recorded for a number of labels, including Deutsche Grammophon (music of Ligeti, Alban Berg, Arnold Schoenberg, Boulez and Unsuk Chin), and KAIROS (music of Alberto Posadas, Matthias Pintscher, Luca Francesconi, Philippe Manoury and Michael Jarrell). Recordings by the EIC have received multiple awards, including the Gramophone Award and the Diapason d'Or

== Commissions by the Ensemble intercontemporain ==
- 2014:
  - Amir Shpilman, Iridescent Stasis
- 2013:
  - Matthias Pintscher, Bereshit
  - Philippe Leroux, Totalsolo
- 2012:
  - Ondřej Adámek, Kameny
  - Enno Poppe, Speicher III and Speicher IV
  - Luc Brewaeys, Fête à tensions
  - Lu Wang, Past beyond
  - Anthony Cheung, Dystemporal
  - Einar Torfi Einarsson, Desiring-Machines
- 2011:
  - Marco Stroppa, Re orso
  - Sean Shepherd, Blur
  - Bernhard Gander, Take nine for twelve
  - Johannes Maria Staud, Par ici!
  - Jacques Rebotier, R.A.S
  - François Sarhan, Talea II
- 2010:
  - Michael Jarrell, La chambre aux échos
  - Hèctor Parra, Caressant l'horizon
  - Lucas Fagin, Lanterna magica
  - Yann Robin, Vulcano

== Music Director ==
- Péter Eötvös (1979–1992)
- David Robertson (1992–2000)
- Jonathan Nott (2000–2003)
- Susanna Mälkki (2006–2013)
- Matthias Pintscher (2013–2023)
- Pierre Bleuse (2023–present)
