= Alexander Vedernikov =

Russian conductor (1964–2020)

- Александр Ведерников
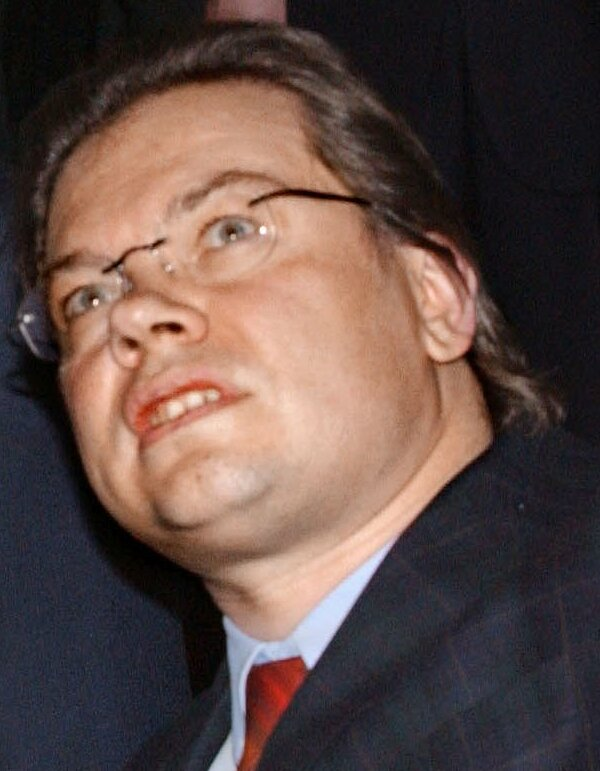
- Vedernikov in 2005
- Born: Александр Александрович Ведерников; Alexander Alexandrovich Vedernikov; 11 January 1964; Moscow, USSR
- Died: 29 October 2020 (aged 56); Moscow, Russia
- Education: Moscow Conservatory
- Occupation: Conductor
- Organizations: Stanislavski and Nemirovich-Danchenko Moscow Academic Music Theatre; Tchaikovsky Symphony Orchestra of Moscow Radio; Bolshoi Theatre; Odense Symphony Orchestra; Royal Danish Opera; Mikhailovsky Theatre

Alexander Alexandrovich Vedernikov (Russian: Александр Александрович Ведерников; 11 January 1964 – 29 October 2020) was a Russian conductor. He held major posts with the Bolshoi Theatre the Odense Symphony Orchestra, the Royal Danish Opera, and the Mikhailovsky Theatre.

== Biography ==
Born in Moscow, Vedernikov was the son of the bass Alexander Filipovich Vedernikov, who sang at the Bolshoi Theatre, and of Natalia Nikolaevna Gureeva, who was a professor of organ at the Moscow Conservatory. He grew up with two siblings in a small apartment. Vedernikov graduated from the Moscow Conservatory in 1988, where he studied with Leonid Nikolaev and also took classes from Mark Ermler. He worked as a conductor in the Stanislavski and Nemirovich-Danchenko Moscow Academic Music Theatre from 1988 to 1990. He was also an assistant conductor to Vladimir Fedoseyev at the Tchaikovsky Symphony Orchestra of Moscow Radio from 1988 to 1995. In 1995, he established the Russian Philharmonia Symphony Orchestra and served as its artistic director and chief conductor until 2004.

Vedernikov became music director of the Bolshoi Theatre in 2001, where he worked on modernising the company. He conducted the first new production of Mussorgsky's Boris Godunov since 1948. He conducted at the house the first production of Cilea's Adriana Lecouvreur in 2002, Mussorgsky's Khovanshchina, Puccini's Turandot, the original version of Glinka's Ruslan and Ludmila, the first production of Prokofiev's The Fiery Angel in 2004, the first Russian performance of the original version of Wagner's The Flying Dutchman and Verdi's Falstaff. He conducted, on a commission from the opera house, the world premiere of Leonid Desyatnikov's The Children of Rosenthal in the 2004/05 season. He led productions of Prokofiev's War and Peace and his ballet Cinderella. He had a contract with the company until 2010, but in July 2009 resigned on the first day of the theater's summer tour, citing disagreements with its management.

Vedernikov made his Covent Garden debut in 1996, where he conducted Prokofiev's Cinderella and Tchaikovsky's Swan Lake. He conducted at the Komische Oper Berlin Smetana's The Bartered Bride, Tchaikovsky's The Queen of Spades, Salome by Richard Strauss and Janáček's The Cunning Little Vixen. At the Paris Opera, he conducted Boris Godunov in 2005, directed by Francesca Zambello. He led Tchaikovsky's Eugene Onegin in 2011. He conducted a double bill of Mascagni's Cavalleria rusticana and Leoncavallo's Pagliacci at the Opernhaus Zürich in 2011, and made his debut at the Metropolitan Opera in New York City, again with Eugene Onegin. In 2013, he conducted Stravinsky's The Rite of Spring with the BBC Orchestra in a centenary concert at the Barbican in London. A critic noted that he "supplied his own wild-man choreography on the podium".

Vedernikov became chief conductor of the Odense Symphony Orchestra in 2009, with an initial three-year contract, which was extended to 2014. In November 2016, the Royal Danish Opera announced Vedernikov's appointment as its next chief conductor, effective from the 2018/19 season. Vedernikov concluded his Odense tenure in 2018, remaining an honorary conductor. In February 2019, he also became music director and principal conductor of the Mikhailovsky Theatre.

Vedernikov died on 29 October 2020, from COVID-19 during the COVID-19 pandemic in Russia.

== Recordings ==
Vedernikov recorded commercially for such labels as Pentatone, Hyperion and Naive.

- Glinka: Ruslan and Ludmila
- Tchaikovsky: The Nutcracker
- DVD: Rimsky-Korsakov: The Legend of the Invisible City of Kitezh and the Maiden Fevroniya - Mikhail Kazakov, Vitaly Panfilov, Tatiana Monogarova, Mikhail Gubsky, Albert Schagidullin, Alexander Naumenko. Orchestra e Coro del Teatro Lirico di Cagliari; Alexander Vedernikov, conductor; Eimuntas Nekrošius, director. 2010
- Tchaikovsky: Eugene Onegin (2020)

Cultural offices
Preceded by Gennady Rozhdestvensky	Music Director, Bolshoi Theatre; 2001–2009	Succeeded by Vassily Sinaisky
Preceded by Paul Mann	Chief Conductor, Odense Symphony Orchestra; 2009–2018	Succeeded by Pierre Bleuse
Preceded by Michael Boder	Chief Conductor, Royal Danish Orchestra; 2018–2020	Succeeded by Marie Jacquot
Preceded by Mikhail Tatarnikov	Music Director and Principal Conductor, Mikhailovsky Theatre; 2019–2020	Succeeded by Alevtina Ioffe (musical director)
