= Kölner Philharmonie =

Symphonic concert hall in Cologne, Germany

Coordinates: 50°56′26″N 6°57′39″E

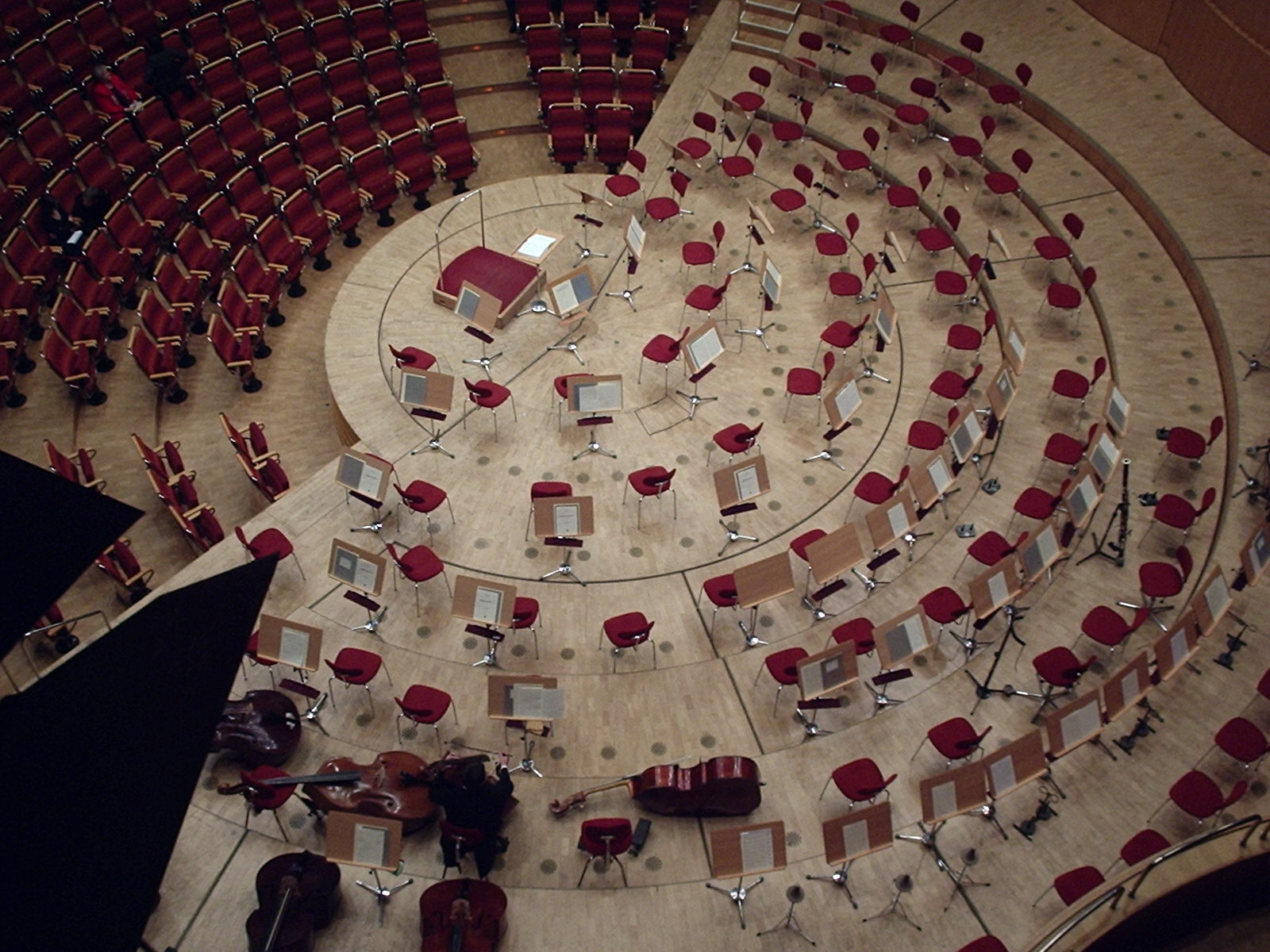
Stage of the Kölner Philharmonie

The Kölner Philharmonie is a symphonic concert hall located in Cologne, Germany. It is part of the building ensemble of the Museum Ludwig and was opened in 1986. The Kölner Philharmonie is located close to the Cologne Cathedral and the Cologne Main Station. The ensemble was designed by the architects Busmann + Haberer in the 1980s.

Roughly 400 concerts are performed annually with approximately 600,000 visitors. The Kölner Philharmonie is the home base for the Gürzenich Orchester Köln and the WDR Sinfonieorchester Köln.

== Architecture ==
=== The concert hall ===
The concert hall was made like an Amphitheatre, to get a close to perfect room acoustic. Therefore, there are no walls which are in parallel to each other, to produce no echo. Size and art of the padding for the seats (the seats were made by the German manufacturer Recaro, which is known for making car [sports] seats) is selected in a way, that the acoustic quieting is constant, independently of the fact if the seat is used by a person or not.

=== Roof ===
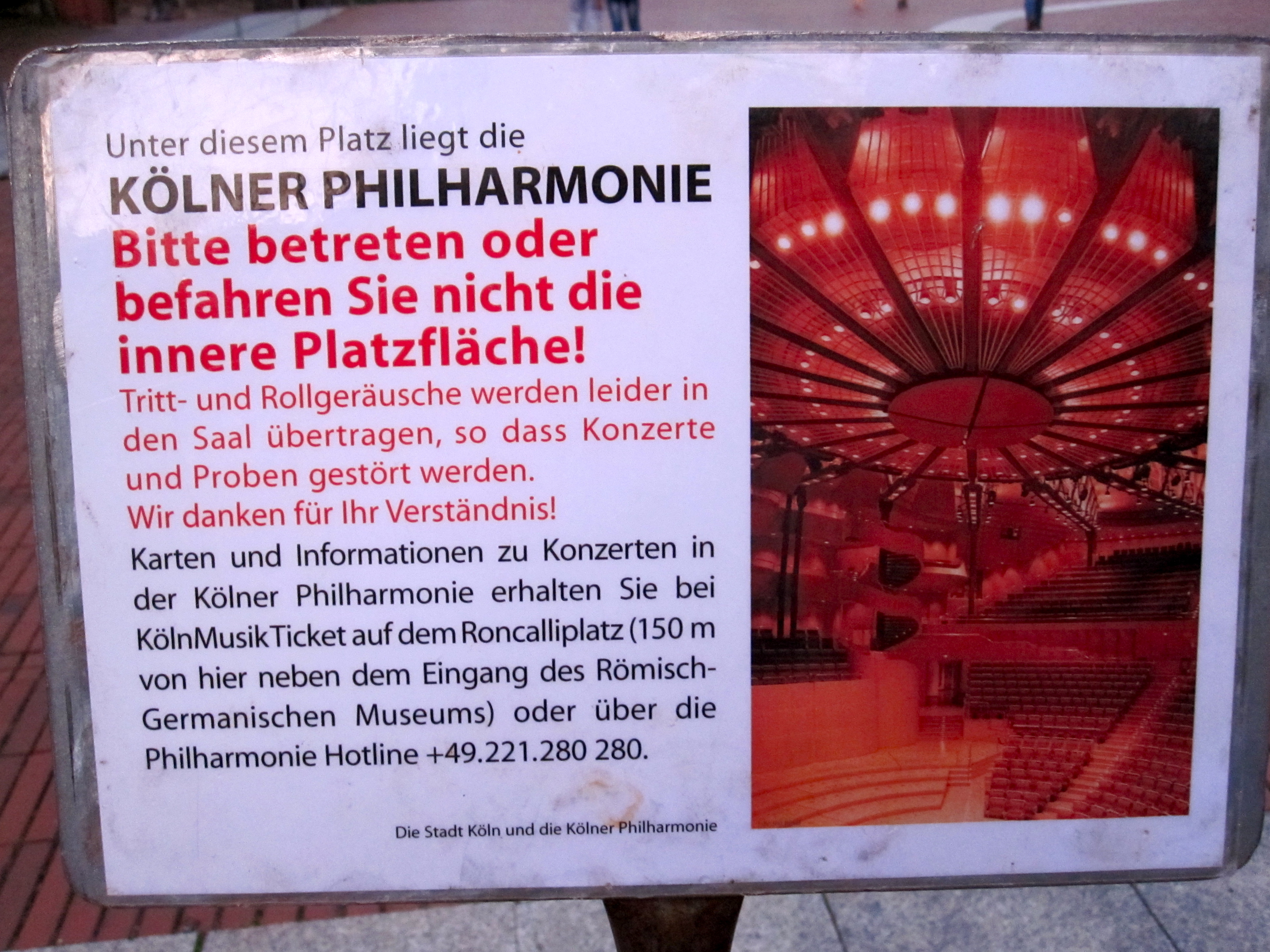
Sign at the Heinrich-Böll square

The hall has no columns in it and has place for 2,000 people. The size of the hall gives some problems: The hall is below the public Heinrich-Böll square. Walking noise from people with stiletto heels or driving noise from skateboards or trolleys can be heard in the hall. Due to this reason, the town square is closed during performance.

=== Pipe organ ===
At the original design of the hall, no pipe organ was planned. Later, the pipe organ building company Klais Orgelbau from Bonn, Germany, got the contract to build an organ. The original instrument was finished in 1986. The original instrument had three keyboards, 70 stops with altogether 5.394 pipes.

=== North-South-Tunnel of the Stadtbahn ===
Currently the North-South-Tunnel of the Cologne Stadtbahn is under construction. The Tunnel is 2 metres (6.6 ft) below the concert hall. In 2009 first acoustic tests have been performed. According to the Intendant Louwrens Langevoort, these tests have not been performed well.
