= Marie Jacquot =

French conductor (born 1990)

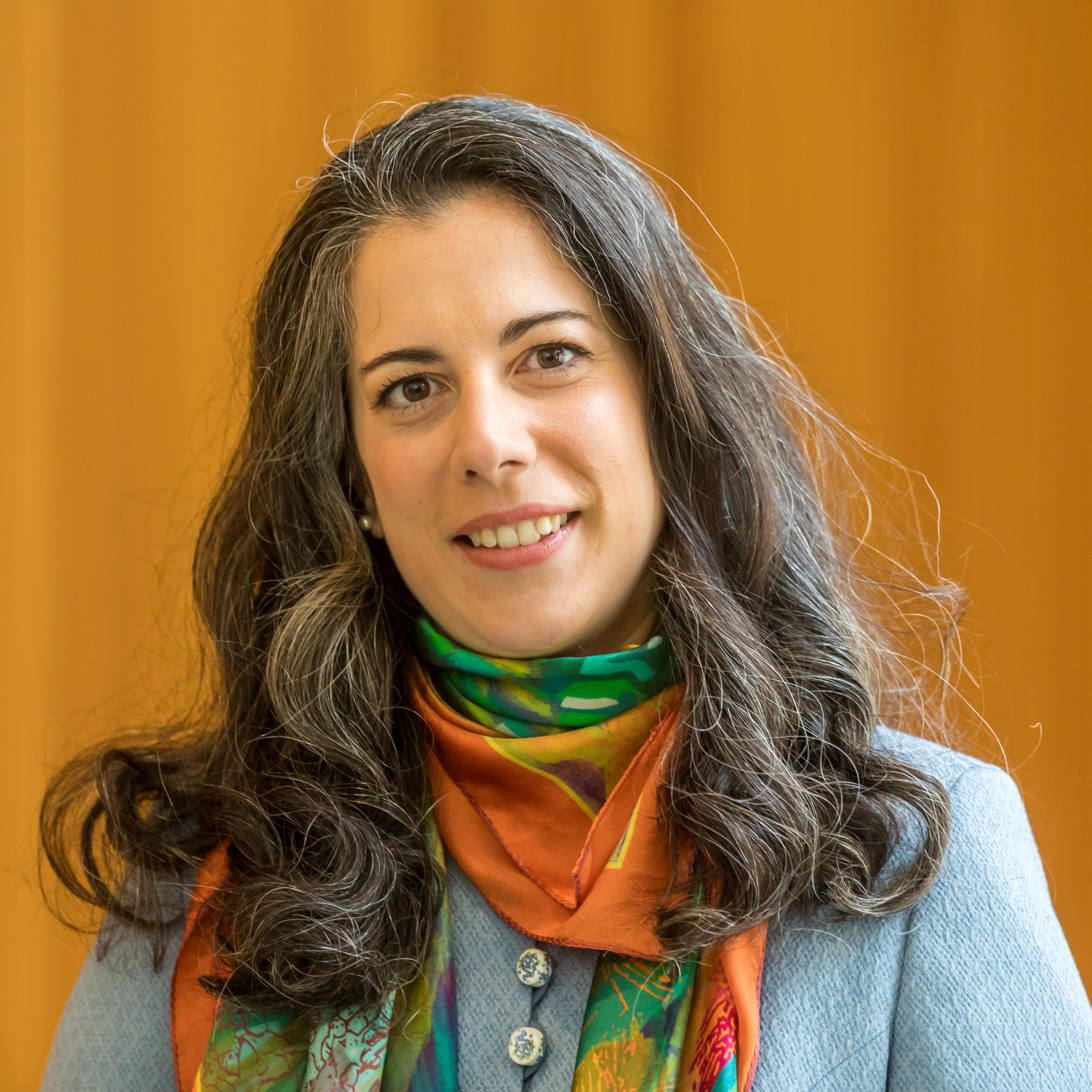
- Born: 1990 (age 35–36); Paris
- Occupation: Conductor
- Organizations: Deutsche Oper am Rhein; Royal Danish Orchestra; Vienna Symphony; WDR Symphony Orchestra
- Website: marie-jacquot.com

Marie Jacquot (born 1990 in Paris) is a French orchestra conductor. She is music director of the Royal Danish Orchestra and chief conductor of the WDR Symphony Orchestra.

== Biography ==
Raised in Lucé near Chartres, Jacquot began her music studies on piano, and subsequently learned to play trombone. Initially, she pursued a tennis career and took part in the French Open in the junior category. At age 15, she changed her focus to music, specifically trombone, versus tennis. She continued her music studies at the University of Music and Performing Arts Vienna with Uroš Lajovic and at the University of Music Franz Liszt Weimar with Nicolás Pasquet.

In 2016, Jacquot was assistant of Kirill Petrenko at the Bavarian State Opera. From 2016 to 2019, Jacquot was Erste Kapellmeisterin and chorus master at the Würzburg Opera. She conducted Verdi's Nabucco, Mozart's Idomeneo, Rossini's The Barber of Seville and Bartók's Herzog Blaubarts Burg. From 2019 to 2022, she was Erste Kapellmeisterin at the Deutsche Oper am Rhein (Düsseldorf/Duisburg). Productions were Verdi's La Traviata, Saint-Saëns' Samson and Delilah and Humperdinck's Hansel and Gretel.

In February 2022, the Royal Danish Orchestra (Det Kongelige Kapel) announced the appointment of Jacquot as its next music director, effective with the 2024–2025 season, with an initial contract of 5 years.

In March 2023, the Vienna Symphony announced the appointment of Jacquot as its next principal guest conductor (Erste Gastdirigentin), the first female conductor to be named to the post, effective with the 2023–2024 season.

Jacquot first guest-conducted the WDR Symphony Orchestra in December 2022. In January 2024, the orchestra announced the appointment of Jacquot as its next chief conductor, effective with the 2026–2027 season, with an initial contract of 4 years. Jacquot is the first female conductor to be named chief conductor of the WDR Symphony Orchestra.

On 29 February 2024, Jacquot was announced as the 2024 Révélation cheffe d'orchestre during the 31st "Victoires de la Musique Classique" ceremony.

Cultural offices
Preceded by Alexander Vedernikov (chief conductor)	Music Director, Royal Danish Orchestra; 2024–present	Succeeded by incumbent
Preceded by Cristian Măcelaru	Principal Conductor, WDR Symphony Orchestra Cologne; 2026–present	Succeeded by incumbent
