= Cristian Măcelaru =

Romanian conductor (born 1980)

Cristian Măcelaru (born 15 March 1980, Timișoara, Romania) is a Romanian conductor. He is currently music director of the Orchestre National de France, of the Cincinnati Symphony Orchestra, and of the Cabrillo Festival of Contemporary Music.

== Biography ==
Măcelaru is the youngest child from a family of 10 children. He studied violin in his youth. He continued his music studies in the United States. He graduated from the University of Miami in 2003 with a B.M. degree. He was concertmaster of the Miami Symphony Orchestra, the youngest concertmaster in the orchestra's history.

Măcelaru further continued his music studies at Rice University, where he developed his interest in conducting. His mentors included Larry Rachleff. Additionally, while at Rice, he conducted the Houston Youth Orchestra, and was a violinist with the Houston Symphony Orchestra for two seasons. He also took master classes in conducting with such mentors as David Zinman, Rafael Frühbeck de Burgos, Oliver Knussen and Stefan Asbury, at the Tanglewood Music Festival and at the Aspen Music Festival. From the Solti Foundation, he received its Emerging Conductor Award in 2012, and the Solti Conducting Award in 2014.

In 2011, Măcelaru became assistant conductor of The Philadelphia Orchestra. He was promoted to associate conductor of the orchestra in 2012, and held this post until 2014. He then served as conductor-in-residence with the orchestra from 2014 to 2017. In 2015, Măcelaru first guest-conducted the Cincinnati Symphony Orchestra in a Cincinnati Opera production of Il Trovatore, and returned to the Cincinnati Symphony for his subscription concert debut with the orchestra in January 2016. He has been music director of the Cabrillo Festival of Contemporary Music since 2017.

In February 2017, Măcelaru first guest-conducted the WDR Symphony Orchestra Cologne. He subsequently returned for three further guest appearances with the orchestra. In May 2018, the orchestra announced the appointment of Măcelaru as its next chief conductor, effective with the 2019–2020 season, with an initial contract of three years. This appointment marks his first full-time orchestral post. In June 2020, the orchestra announced an extension of his contract through July 2025. In October 2023, the orchestra announced that Măcelaru is to stand down as its chief conductor at the close of the 2024–2025 season, and to take the title of Artistic Partner for the 2025–2026 season.

In September 2018, Măcelaru first guest-conducted the Orchestre National de France (ONF), and returned for a second guest-conducting appearance in the summer of 2019. On the basis of these appearances, in November 2019, the ONF announced the appointment of Măcelaru as its next music director, effective 1 September 2021, with an initial contract of four years. Following the resignation of Emmanuel Krivine as ONF music director in May 2020, Măcelaru became music director of the ONF on 1 September 2020, one year earlier than originally scheduled. In September 2022, the ONF announced an extension to Măcelaru's contract through 2027. Măcelaru is scheduled to conclude his tenure with the ONF at the close of the 2026–2027 season.

In August 2023, Măcelaru led his first season as artistic director of the George Enescu Festival. In April 2024, the Cincinnati Symphony Orchestra announced the appointment of Măcelaru as its next music director, effective with the 2025–2026 season, with an initial contract through the 2028–2029 season. He held the title of music director-designate for the 2024–2025 season. Măcelaru is represented by Charlotte Lee at Primo Artists.

Măcelaru and his wife Cheryl, a bassoonist, have two children. The family resides in Paris. Măcelaru became an American citizen in 2019.

== Honors, awards and recognitions ==
- Andrew Carnegie Foundation Great Immigrant, 2026
- Grammy Award for Best Classical Instrumental Solo 2020 (Nicola Benedetti (soloist) and Cristian Macelaru (conductor) for Marsalis: Violin Concerto; Fiddle Dance Suite

Cultural offices
Preceded by Marin Alsop	Music Director, Cabrillo Festival of Contemporary Music; 2017–present	Succeeded by incumbent
Preceded by Jukka-Pekka Saraste	Chief Conductor, WDR Symphony Orchestra Cologne; 2019–2025	Succeeded by Marie Jacquot
