= Pierre Bleuse =

French conductor

- Bleuse, in c. 2000
- Born: 6 November 1977 (age 48); Boulogne-Billancourt, France
- Education: Conservatoire de Boulogne-Billancourt; Conservatoire national de région; Geneva University of Music
- Occupations: Conductor; Violinist
- Organizations: Satie Quartet; Toulouse Chamber Orchestra; Lemanic Modern Ensemble; Musika Orchestra Academy; Odense Symphony Orchestra; Pablo Casals Festival; Ensemble intercontemporain
- Website: www.pierrebleuse.com

Pierre Bleuse (born 6 November 1977) is a French conductor and violinist. He has been chief conductor of the Odense Symphony Orchestra and artistic director of the Pablo Casals Festival from 2021, and music director of the Ensemble intercontemporain from 2023.

== Biography ==
Bleuse was born in Boulogne-Billancourt into a family of musicians: his father Marc Bleuse is a composer, his mother Anne Fondeville is an opera singer, his brother Emmanuel is a cellist and his sister Jeanne is a pianist. Bleuse began his musical studies on violin at the Conservatoire de Boulogne-Billancourt in the classes of Jean Lenert and Suzanne Gessner. He continued his studies at the Conservatoire national de région in Toulouse in the classes of Pierre Doukan and Guenadi Hoffmann from 1990. He obtained his violin and chamber music prizes in 1994. He then returned to Paris and entered the Conservatoire de Paris in the class of Patrice Fontanarosa. He graduated with a 1st prize in 2002, and studied further at the Berlin University of the Arts.

=== Violinist ===
After his studies, Bleuse became a member of the Satie Quartet and the ensembles Court-Circuit and TM+. He was concertmaster and associate conductor of the Toulouse Chamber Orchestra from 2000 to 2010. He also studied Baroque violin with Gilles Colliard.

=== Conductor ===
In 2010, Bleuse decided to turn to conducting. He studied with Jorma Panula in Finland, and continued his conducting studies with Laurent Gay at the Geneva University of Music in 2011. After he graduated in 2013, he became assistant to Gay.

From 2012, Bleuse began regular collaboration with the Orchestre National du Capitole de Toulouse. He has also worked as an assistant at the Opéra de Lyon from 2017, notably in the production of Orfeo ed Euridice, directed by David Morten. After being spotted by Thierry Fischer in 2014 at the Mozarteum University Salzburg, he was invited for his U.S. debut to conduct the Utah Symphony in Salt Lake City in July 2016.

Bleuse co-founded the Lemanic Modern Ensemble for contemporary repertoire, and served as its co-music director. Michael Jarrell entrusted him in January 2017 with conducting the ensemble in his opera Cassandre, starring Fanny Ardant, performed at the Grand Théâtre de Provence. His close relationship with Jarrell led him to conduct his anniversary concert in October 2018 at the Victoria Hall in Geneva, with the Lemanic Modern Ensemble and the Orchestre de la Suisse Romande. Bleuse was a co-founder and artistic director of the Musika Orchestra Academy, a European school of orchestral studies.

As a guest conductor, Bleuse made his debut with the Royal Concertgebouw Orchestra in 2023. He has also conducted the London Philharmonic Orchestra, the Orchestre de Paris, the BBC Symphony Orchestra and, outside Europe, the Tokyo Symphony Orchestra and the Singapore Symphony Orchestra.

=== Music director ===
Bleuse became chief conductor of the Odense Symphony Orchestra, succeeding Alexander Vedernikov, as well as Artistic Director of the Pablo Casals Festival in Prades, in 2021. His contract in Odense was later extended to 2026. At the festival, he re-established the festival orchestra, which brings together established musicians and young players.

In December 2021, the Ensemble intercontemporain announced the appointment of Bleuse as its next music director, effective with the 2023–2024 season, with an initial contract of 4 years. In June 2023, Bleuse conducted the world premiere of Hèctor Parra's opera Orgia, staged by Calixto Bieito, with the Ensemble intercontemporain at the Teatro Arriaga in Bilbao, and conducted the production again at the Gran Teatre del Liceu in Barcelona in April 2024. In 2025, he conducted Répons at the Philharmonie de Paris to open the ensemble's celebrations of the Pierre Boulez centenary, and led the ensemble at the BBC Proms.

== Recordings ==
- Ligeti (concertos and chamber music), Ensemble intercontemporain, with Hae-Sun Kang, Renaud Déjardin and Dimitri Vassilakis. Alpha Classics ALPHA 993 (2 CDs, 2024).
- Unsuk Chin (Gougalōn, Double Concerto, Graffiti), Ensemble intercontemporain, with Dimitri Vassilakis and Samuel Favre. Alpha Classics ALPHA 1200 (2026).
- Viola Concertos by Karsten Fundal, Christian Winther Christensen and Søren Nils Eichberg, with violist Rafaell Altino, Odense Symphony Orchestra. Dacapo Records (2026).

Cultural offices
Preceded by Alexander Vedernikov	Chief Conductor, Odense Symphony Orchestra; 2021–present	Succeeded by incumbent
