= Marc Bleuse =

French musician, composer and conductor

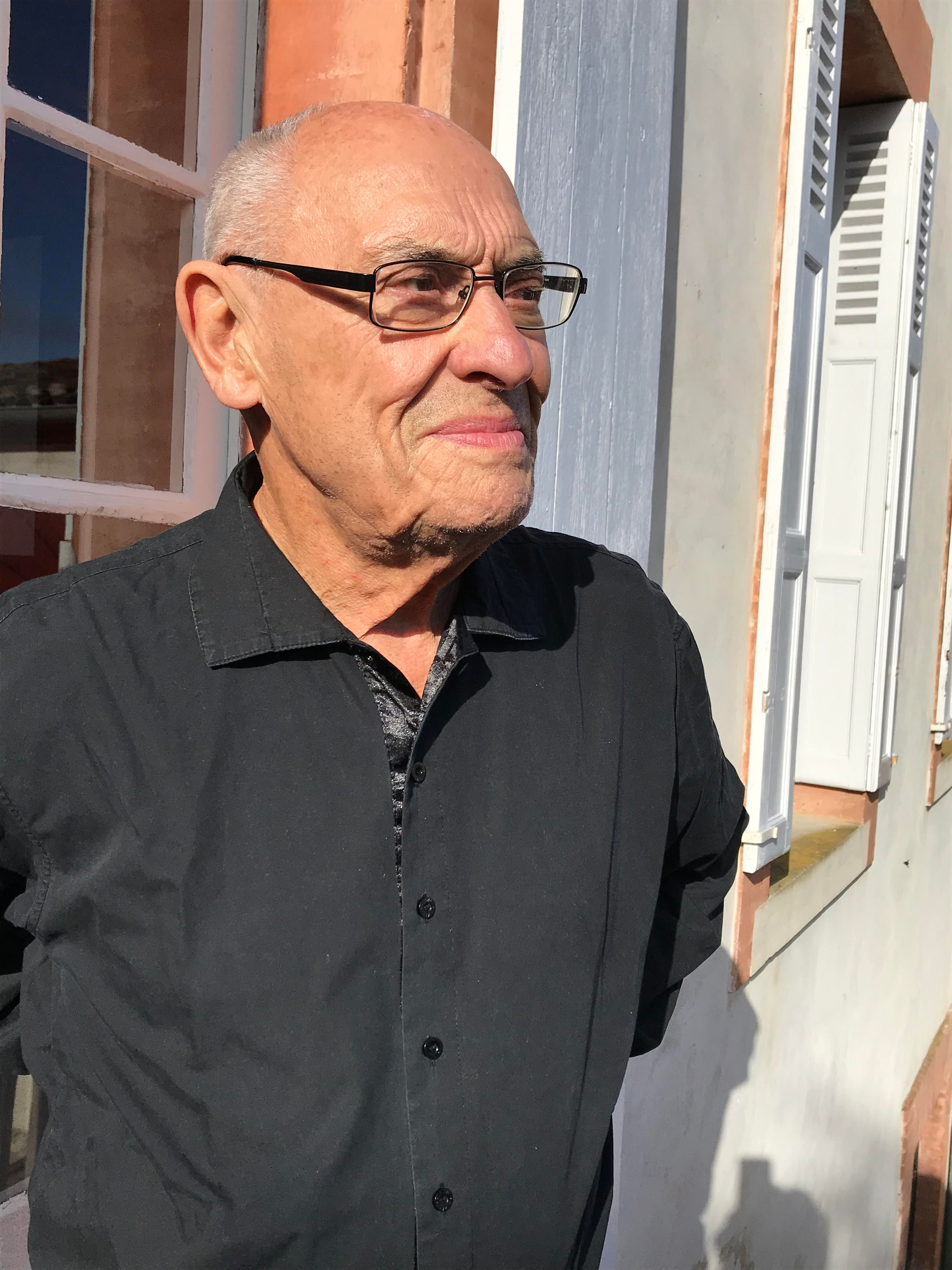
- Bleuse at home in 2019, Lauragais (S-W of France)
- Born: 23 February 1937 (age 88); Niort, France
- Education: Conservatoire de Paris
- Occupation(s): Composer and conductor

Marc Bleuse (born 23 February 1937 in Niort) is a French musician, composer and conductor.

== Biography ==
Bleuse's mother was a piano player who performed a great deal of chamber music. Her being in the music industry motivated Bleuse to develop interest in music.

Bleuse started to study piano when he was six years old. In 1967 his music was first published.

He was a pupil of Simone Plé and André Jolivet at the Conservatoire de Paris. From the beginning of his career, this composer devoted himself essentially to pedagogy.

In January 1984 he was appointed director of the Conservatoire de Paris, a position he held until 1986.

Bleuse has three children: Emmanuel (cellist), Pierre (conductor) and Jeanne (pianist).

== Selection of works ==
Alternative for viola and piano (1974); Éditions Heugel
Bairro Alto (Quartier Haut) for viola solo (1995); Éditions Gérard Billaudot
El Contador for viola solo (1981); Éditions Gérard Billaudot
