= Royal Danish Orchestra =

Danish orchestra based in Copenhagen

- Orchestra
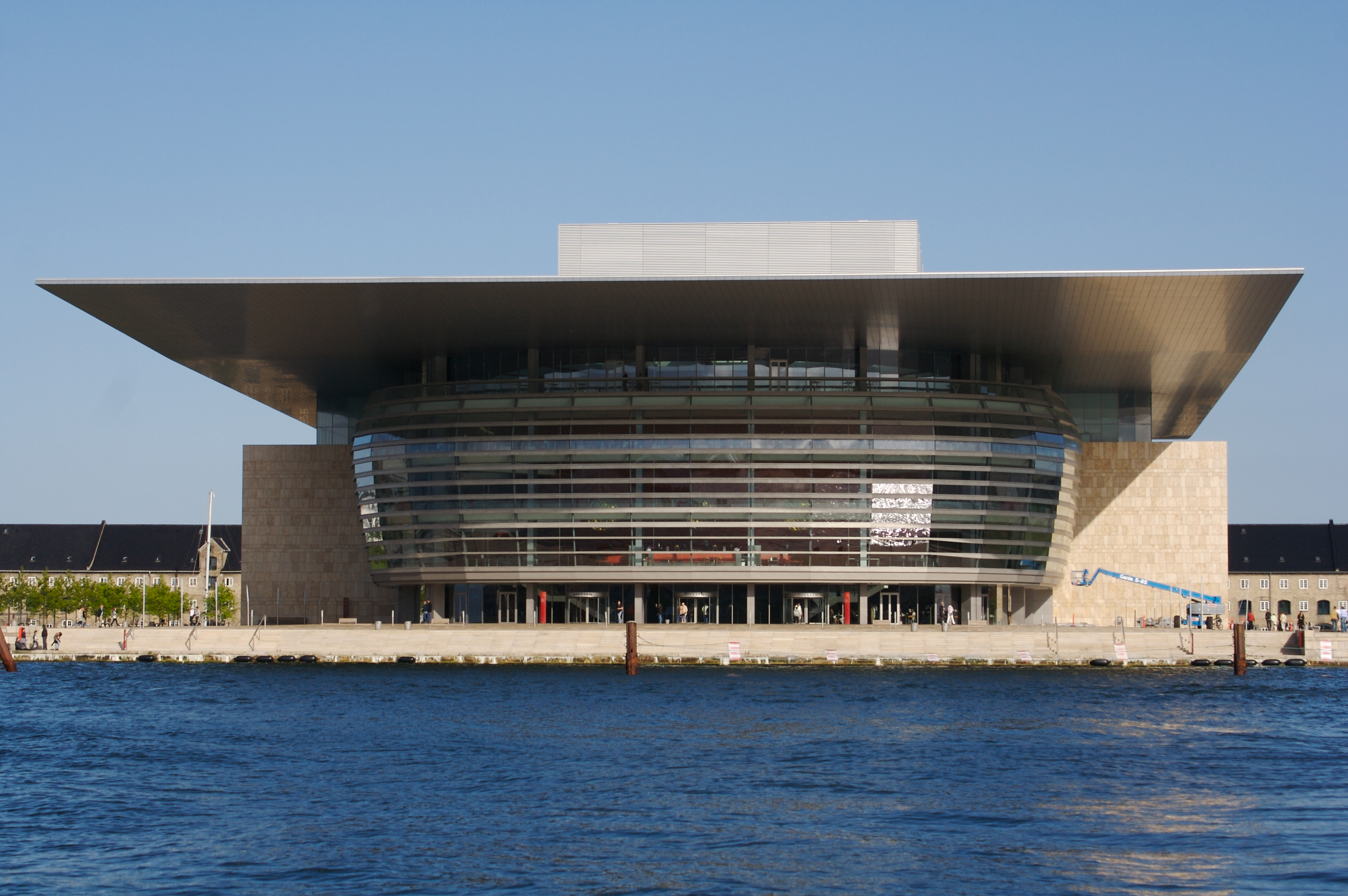
- Copenhagen Opera House
- Short name: RDO
- Founded: 1448; 578 years ago
- Location: Copenhagen
- Concert hall: Copenhagen Opera House
- Principal conductor: Marie Jacquot
- Website: RDO; Kapellet

The Royal Danish Orchestra (Danish: Det Kongelige Kapel) is a Danish orchestra based in Copenhagen. The Danish name for the orchestra indicates its original function as an ensemble geared to supplying the music for court events. The Royal Danish Orchestra presently consists of around 100 musicians. The principal venue for the orchestra's traditional symphony concerts is the Copenhagen Opera House, where the orchestra also serves as the orchestra for the Royal Danish Opera, as well as holding several annual chamber orchestra concerts in the foyer of the smaller experimental stage Takkelloftet. Most ballet and some opera performances take place at the Old Stage of the Royal Danish Theatre.

== History ==
The orchestra traces its origins back to 1448 and the trumpet corps at the royal court of King Christian I, and thus has claims to be the oldest orchestra in the world.

Over the years, the orchestra moved out of the court and settled down in the pit at the Royal Danish Theatre. Its leaders included Christoph Willibald Gluck, who composed the music for special occasions such as the celebration of the birth, in 1749, of the later King Christian VII, whilst in Denmark. A growing number of engagements saw an increase in the size of the orchestra. When Johann Gottlieb Naumann carried out his reforms in the 1780s, the ensemble numbered 46 members. At this time, the Chorus of the Royal Danish Opera became permanently assigned to the Royal Danish Theatre. F. L. Æ. Kunzen introduced Mozart into the ensemble's repertoire in the 1790s.

The tenure of Johan Svendsen, starting in 1883, began a pronounced period of growth and development for the orchestra, including Svendsen's introduction of major symphonic works in a series of concerts by the Royal Danish Orchestra that gradually became a tradition in the world of Danish music, while the major symphonies became the domain of the orchestra. Carl Nielsen served with the orchestra for many years, partly as 2nd violinist and partly as conductor. King Frederik IX enjoyed a particularly close relationship with the Royal Danish Orchestra, pursuing with its members his interest for the art of conducting.

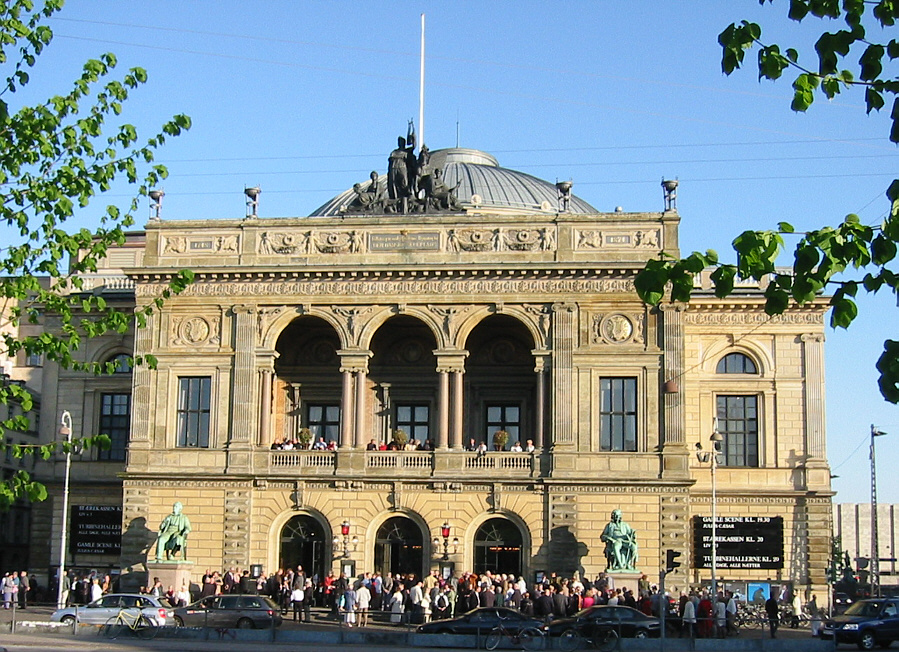
Gammel scene or Old Stage at Kongens Nytorv, home of the Royal Danish Orchestra since 1874

Michael Schønwandt was the orchestra's principal conductor, from 2000 to 2011. In September 2011, the orchestra announced the appointment of Jakub Hrůša as its next music director, effective September 2013. However, in January 2012, in the wake of the resignation of Keith Warner from the artistic directorship of the Royal Danish Opera following proposed budget cuts, Hrůša announced that he would not take the music directorship of Royal Danish Opera, and with that the corresponding post with the Royal Danish Orchestra, in solidarity with Warner's action. In May 2012, the orchestra announced the appointment of Michael Boder as its next chief conductor and artistic advisor, effective August 2012. Boder held the post through 2016. In November 2017, the orchestra announced Alexander Vedernikov as its next chief conductor. Vedernikov held the post from 2018 until his death in October 2020.

The orchestra's current principal guest conductor is Paolo Carignani, as of the 2021–2022 season, with an initial contract of 3 years. In February 2022, the orchestra announced the appointment of Marie Jacquot as its next music director, effective with the 2024–2025 season, with an initial contract of 5 years. Jacquot is the first female conductor to be named music director of Det Kongelige Kapel.

== Principal conductors ==
- Heinrich Schütz
- Johann Gottlieb Naumann
- Johann Abraham Peter Schulz
- Friedrich Kunzen
- Claus Schall
- Niels Gade
- Holger Simon Paulli
- Johan Svendsen (1883–1908)
- Frederik Rung
- Georg Høeberg (1914–1930)
- Egisto Tango and Johan Hye-Knudsen
- John Frandsen (1946–1980)
- Paavo Berglund (1993–1998)
- Michael Schønwandt (2000–2011)
- Michael Boder (2012–2016)
- Alexander Vedernikov (2018–2020)
- Paolo Carignani (2021–2024)
- Marie Jacquot (2024–present)
