= Georg Høeberg =

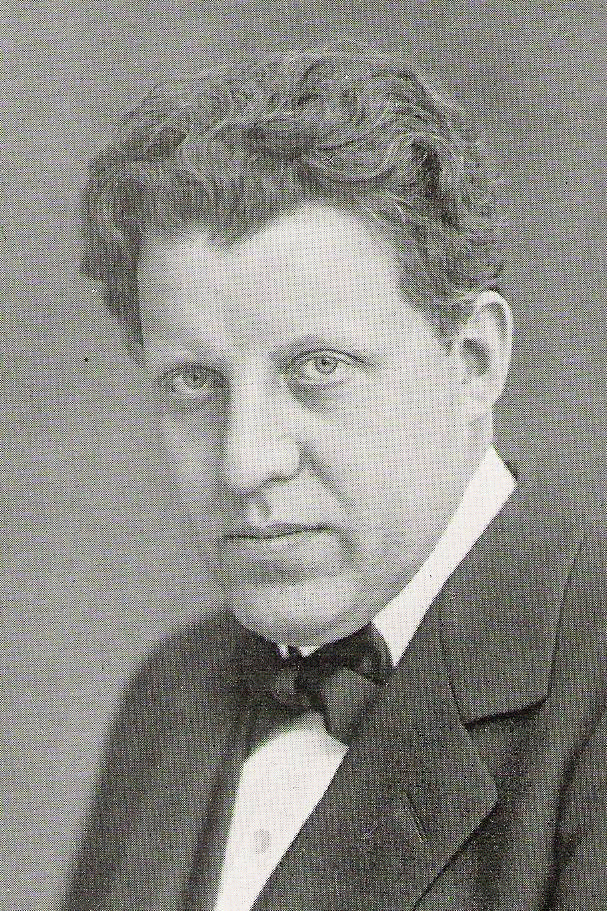
Georg Høeberg.

Georg Valdemar Høeberg (27 December 1872 – 3 August 1950) was a Danish violinist, conductor and composer. He was the brother of the opera singer Albert Høeberg and cellist Ernst Høeberg and grandson of Hans Christian Lumbye.

He was born in Copenhagen. In 1888 he became a student at the Music Academy with George Ditleff Bondesen, Gade and Valdemar Tofte as teachers. The violin was his main instrument and he also studied the piano and composition.

After further violin studies in Berlin he got a job as a violinist in the Royal Chapel from 1897 - 1901. At the same time he began composing, and in 1899 he received the Anckerske Scholarship. From 1900 he was additionally violin teacher at the Conservatory until 1914 when he became conductor of the Royal chapel as a replacement for Choquan Deez. He held this post until 1930. In the years from 1910 to 1914 he was head of the concerts in the Danish Concert Association and there proved his abilities as a conductor. He died in Vedbaek.

His musical output was small.

== List of works ==
- op. 1 Sonata in G major (violin and piano)
- op. 2 Sonata in A minor (cello and piano)
- op. 3 Romance (Violin and Orchestra / Piano)
- op. 4 Cinq Morceaux (piano)
- op. 5 Melodie and Etude-Caprice (Violin and Piano)
- op. 7 Moods (9 Piano Pieces 1910)
- op. 8 A wedding in the Catacombs (1909 opera)
- op. 10 Antonies Temptations (ballet)
- op. 11 Two songs (flowers sleep, a little bivise - chorus)
- op. 12 Symphony in E major
- op. 13 Two Songs for Male Choir (The Danish Ager ..)
- op. 14 Lyric Pieces (violin and piano - at least 5-1911)
- op. 15 Legend for String Orchestra 1934
- op. 16 Songs (So glow you're like Flower Dew, So many a time I have appealed; Often when my soul I think - 1911)
- op. 17 Paris Court (Ballet 1912)
- op. 26 Fantasy Symphonic Concert Piece (choir and orchestra 1944)
- Allegretto (oboe and orchestra / piano - 1894)
- Romanze (song 1894)
- Carmela (song 1894)
- Denmark's march (1911)
- When thou, my God, even (orchestra 1931)
- Variations on a Theme by Johann Gottlieb Naumann (1931)
- If Denmark coming days / to be bright with breakfast Cut (song 1934)
- Variations on a Theme by WA Mozart from The Marriage of Figaro (1937)
- If Denmark next few days (SATB 1941)
- Andante for Horn and Organ (1942)
- Nordic Festpræludium (bl. Choir and orchestra)
- For my heart's Queen (song)
- Love's Comedy (drama in three acts)

Cultural offices
Preceded by Frederik Rung	Principal Conductors, Royal Danish Orchestra; 1914–1930	Succeeded by Egisto Tango and Johan Hye-Knudsen
