= Johannes Poulsen =

Danish actor and director (1881-1938)

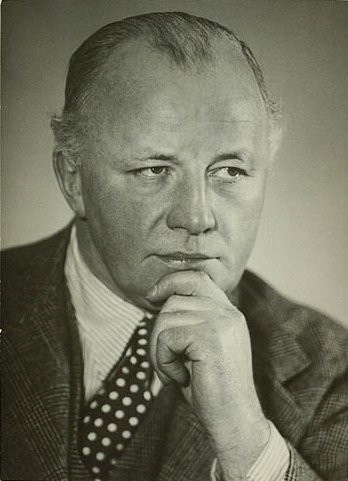
- Johannes Poulsen
- Born: 17 November 1881; Copenhagen, Denmark
- Died: 14 October 1938 (aged 56)
- Years active: 1901–1938
- Spouse: Ulla Skou

Johannes Poulsen (17 November 1881 – 14 October 1938) was a Danish actor and director. He debuted with the Dagmar Theatre in 1901. In 1909 he joined the Royal Theatre as an actor, and from 1917 was also a stage director. Memorable roles included Peer Gynt, Shylock, Henry VIII and the fool in Twelfth Night. Poulsen debuted on film in 1910 with Regia Art Films, and later starred in four films for Nordisk Film. He wrote the book Gennem de fagre riger (English: Through the Fair Realms) which was published in 1916.

In 1919 Poulsen staged Adam Oehlenschläger's drama Aladdin with music to be composed by Carl Nielsen. After accepting the contract, Nielsen found that Poulsen was making the orchestra play under the huge staircase in the center of the scenery and using the orchestra pit in the set. When Poulsen cut out large parts of the music during final rehearsals and changed the sequence of dances, Nielsen demanded that his name be removed from the poster and the program.

Poulsen remained with the Royal Theatre until 1927. From 1928 to 1930 he gave guest appearances in several European capitals, before returning the Royal Theatre where he became its director.

While in this capacity, he was invited by the California Festival Association in 1936 to stage an outdoor production of the medieval pageant, Everyman, at the Hollywood Bowl. Legendary film producer Irving Thalberg arranged for the play's backing through the support of Dr. A.H. Giannini of the Bank of America, with the proviso that a large portion of the production's profits would benefit Jewish refugees from Hitler's Germany. Thalberg hosted a lavish dinner for Dr. Poulsen the week before its premiere, attended by MGM chairman, Louis B. Mayer, among other Hollywood elite, and the production itself - an expensively-mounted spectacular of the 15th century morality play - opened to a star-studded premiere with 12,000 people in the audience. (This was Thalberg's last professional work before his death at age 36 later that month. )

During this same visit, Charlie Chaplin presented Dr. Poulsen with his own director's chair, which he had personally autographed, to donate to the Royal Theater Museum in Copenhagen.

Poulsen remained with the Royal Theater until his death two years later, performing for the last time as Christian IV in Elves' Hill on 31 May 1938. Shortly before his death he played with George Schnéevoigt in the movie Champagnegaloppen.

== Filmography ==
- 1910 – Elskovsbarnet
- 1910 – Djævlesonaten
- 1910 – Et Gensyn
- 1910 – Elskovsleg
- 1911 – Balletdanserinden'
- 1911 – Dyrekøbt Glimmer
- 1912 – Indbruddet hos Skuespillerinden
- 1938 – Champagnegaloppen
