= Pille Lill =

Estonian opera singer

Pille Lill (born April 20, 1962) is an Estonian opera singer (soprano), politician and an active member of the cultural life, the founder and artistic director of PLMF Music Trust. She is the daughter of Uno-Rufus Uibo, the child of Ülo Kornelius Hermann, who was the son of the Estonian composer, linguist, writer, publisher, journalist, and encyclopedist, as well as a prominent figure of the national movement, Karl August Hermann.

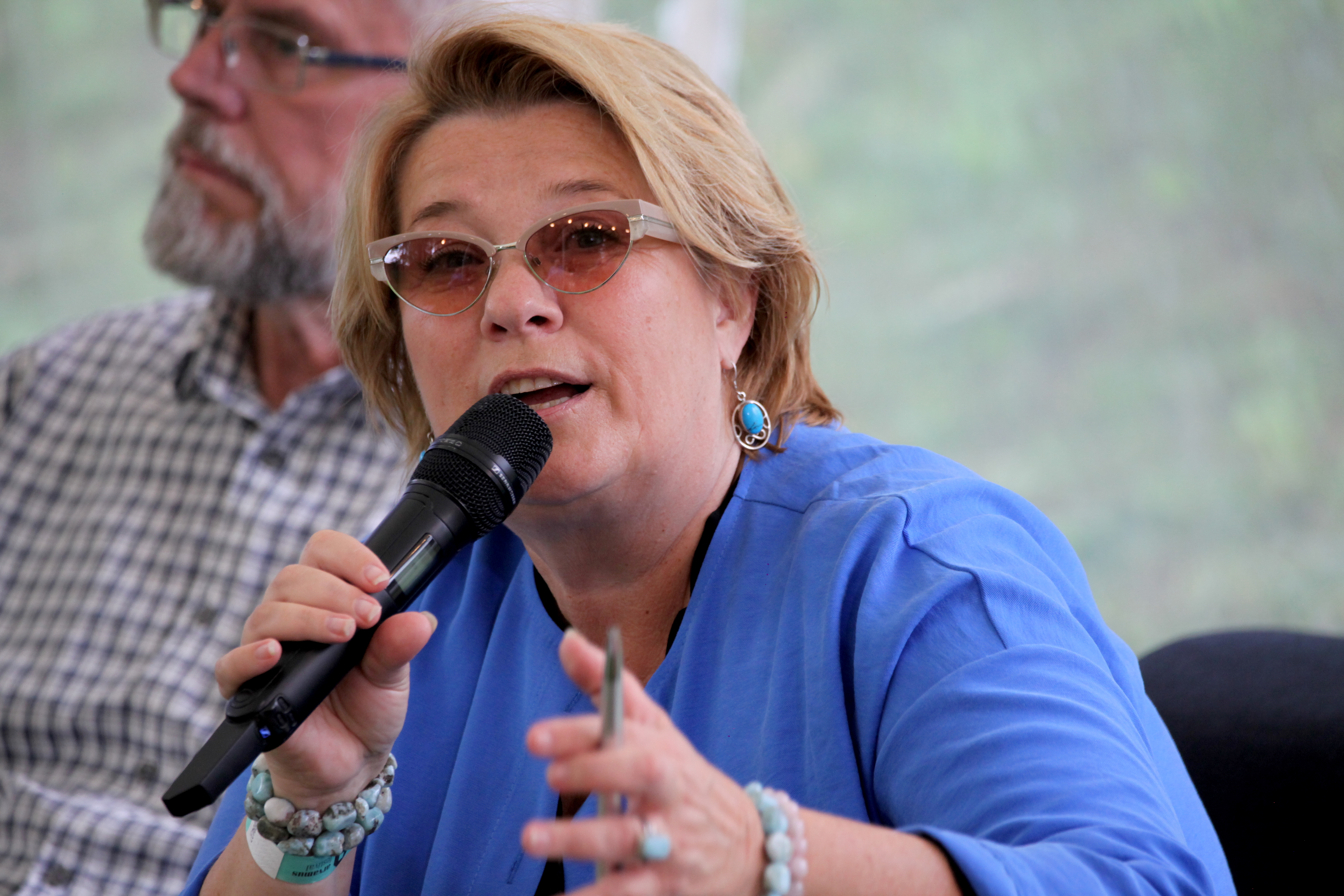
Pille Lill at the Opinion Festival 2021 in Paide, Estonia

== Biography ==
Pille Lill was born in Pärnu. She started her journey as a musician with piano studies at Pärnu Children's Music School. She has graduated the Estonian Academy of Music and Theatre (EAMT) with two specialties – music pedagogy/choir conducting (prof. Artur Vahter) and opera singing (assist. prof. Rostislav Gurjev). She continued her studies as an operasinger at Helsinki Sibelius Academy (prof. Mirja Klemi) and after that at the post graduate level of the London Guildhall School of Music and Drama (prof. Johanna Peters). She defended her master's degree at the Sibelius Academy (2003, prof. Liisa Linko-Malmio). During 2004–2011 she furthered her skills at the doctorate level of EAMT (prof. Jaakko Ryhänen), in the context of which she studied at the University of Music Karlsruhe in 2005–2006 in the German lied class (Professors Hartmut Höll and Mitsuko Shirai). She has taken part of several masterclasses by world-famous distinguished musicians - Elisabeth Söderström, Irwin Gage, Emma Kirkby, Mauriz Sillem, Gerhard Kahry, Eva Märtson-Wilson, Andre Orlowitz, Wilma Vernocchi, Gundula Hinz etc.

Pille Lill has been a vocal teacher in the Voice Department of EAMT from 1997 to 2003 (assistant professor from 2003), instructed master's level students in German lied class (2007–2013) and directed EAMT's opera studio (2004–2005). She has given master classes in many countries (Estonia, Germany, Finland, Belarus, Latvia, Russia, Israel, Italy, Ukraine) and her most outstanding students either have worked or are working at the Estonian National Opera (Helen Lokuta, Angelika Mikk, Olga Palamartchuk, Oliver Kuusik) and Latvian National Opera (Marlena Keine). She has been a part of the jury of the Estonian National Vocal Contest (2009, 2013, 2017, 2022) and St. Petersburg Chopin (2015, 2019) and Rachmaninov (2016) International Competition for singers, Jerusalem Young Artist Opera Festival Competition (2018) and T.O.S.C.A Opera Singers Competition in Italy (2018, 2022, 2024).

Pille Lill is the founder and artistic director of the PLMF Music Trust from 2003. The goal of the organisation is to support talented musicians by offering further education and performing opportunities on various stages in Estonia and abroad. PLMF is developing diverse cross border cooperation through being a part of International Artist Managers’ Association(IAMA), European Festivals’ Association (EFA) and International Society for the Performing Arts (ISPA). PLMF has created five festivals - Tallinn Chamber Music Festival from 2005 (including every-year prizes for the musicians), Tallinn Winter Festival from 2006 (including good deed initiative with the motto "Open your eyes, open your heart"), Virumaa Music Festival from 2019 (including the Virumaa Young Musician competition), Eivere Piano Festival (with Summer School for pianists), Väike-Maarja Music Festival (including National Vocal Contest, which is dedicated to the early deceased outstanding tenor Vello Jürna). In addition, PLMF is organizing Rapla Church Music Festival from 2010, which is featuring International Rapla International Summer Academy for singers and Valga–Valka Churches Summer Music Festival from 2020.

Pille Lill is a board member of the Estonian Chamber of Culture from 2015 and was a board member of Finnish-Estonian Culture Fund 2016–2020. From 2003 to 2009 she was a board member of the Association of Estonian Professional Musicians. .

Pille Lill has been a member of the Isamaa Party since 2017 and the spokesperson of their Cultural Policy Council. Since 2018, she has served as the head of Isamaa’s Haabersti branch, and since 2025 she has been a member of the party’s Honorary Court. In 2024–2025, she was a member of the Tallinn City Council’s Education and Culture Committee, and since 2024 she has been the vice-chair of Isamaa Women’s Association IREN.

She has served as a member of the Haabersti District Administrative Council (2017–2019), as vice-chair of the Isamaa Party Council (2019–2024), and as vice-chair of the Isamaa Tallinn regional board (2022–2024).

In the 2023 Riigikogu elections, she ran in electoral district No. 2 (Tallinn City Centre, Lasnamäe, and Pirita districts), where she received 279 votes and was not elected. In the 2025 local government elections, she ran in the Kristiine electoral district, where she received 440 votes, and was not elected.

== Discography ==
Pille Lill has performed as an opera, oratorio and chamber music singer in numerous countries. She has sung lead roles in nearly 30 operas:

- Mozart – Countess "Marriage of Figaro", Donna Anna "Don Giovanni", Pamina "Magic Flute";
- Puccini - Mimi "La Bohéme", Cio-cio san "Madama Butterfly", Tosca "Tosca";
- Verdi - Elisabeth "Don Carlos", Desdemona "Othello", Violetta "Traviata", Elvira "Ernani", Amelia "Un ballo in maschera", Lady Macbeth "Macbeth", Aida "Aida";
- Weber – Agathe "Der Freischütz";
- Wagner - Venus "Tannhäuser";
- Tchaikovsky - Liza "The Queen of Spades";
- Mascagni - Santuzza "Cavalleria Rusticana";
- Strauss - Chrysothemis "Elektra";
- Tubin - Barbara "Barbara von Tisenhusen";
- Prokofjev - Fata Morgana "The Love for Three Oranges" etc.

Her repertory includes a number of soprano parts from such grand musical pieces:

- Mahler - 4. and 8. Symphony;
- Mozart - "Requiem";
- Brahms - "Requiem";
- Verdi - "Requiem";
- Beethoven - "9. Symphony";
- Tobias - "Des Jona Sendung";
- Shostakovich - "14. Symphony";
- Sibelius - "Kullervo" etc.

She has premiered works by many contemporary composers (Lepo Sumera, Põldmäe, Kaumann, Pertmann, Pozdejev, Andersson, Reinvere etc.).

Pille Lill has cooperated with many distinguished conductors (Gennady Rozhdestvensky, Carlo Felice Cillario, Neeme Järvi, Eri Klas, Carlos Miguel Prieto, Nikolay Alekseyev, John Storgårds, Gintaras Rinkevičius, Arvo Volmer, Mihkel Kütson, Jüri Alperten, Olari Elts, Andres Mustonen, Anu Tali, Paul Mägi, Lauri Sirp, Risto Joost etc.) and her voice is captured on numerous recordings for Estonian Public Broadcasting and on many CD-s - R. Tobias “Des Jona Sendung” (con. N. Järvi - 1995 Grammofon AB BIS; 2009 DVD, VAI), M. Sink "Christmas Songs" (PLMF 2006), L. Sumera “To Reach Yesterday” (Megadisc 2005), A. Kapp “Organ and Chamber Music” (Eres 2000), J. Torrim “Organ Music” (Antes 1997).

== Acknowledgements ==
- Big Dipper Award (Estonian: Suure Vankri auhind) for Best Female Singer (1996)
- grantee of the Wagner Society Scholarship (1998)
- Georg Ots Award – Best Singer (2002)
- 3rd class honoree of the Order of Bishop Platon (2005)
- UNICEF Bluebird Award (2009)
- Cultural Endowment of Estonia Award (2014)
- 4th class Order of the White Star (2016)
- Esther of the Evangelical Lutheran Church of Estonia (2017)
- Order of Tallinn (2019)
- Annual award of the Rapla County Expert Group of the Cultural Endowment (2020)
- Rapla county silver coat of arms (2020)
- Rapla Parish Mary Magdalene Award (2022)
- IREN of the Year title from the Isamaa Women’s Association for contributions to cultural activities (2023)
