= PLMF Music Trust =

Organization based in Estonia

PLMF Music Trust was inaugurated on 7 February 2003 to support the development of Estonian musicians by organizing master classes, opportunities to perform and by introducing them internationally. The founders of the trust decided to name it after the opera singer Pille Lill.

In 2004 the PLMF introduced two series of classical chamber-music concerts, performed throughout Estonia: Master School and Music of the Soul which present Estonian top soloists in our largest towns and smallest villages. The Youth Master School series of concerts presents young talents of the Estonian Academy of Music and Theatre. Since 2009 concerts are organized in other countries as well in cooperation with the partners from these countries.

Musicians that PLMF has been working with

In 2005 the Tallinn Chamber Music Festival held its opening concert, amidst formidable publicity. Through the generosity of distinguished private donors, the following awards are presented during the Festival: the PLMF Marje and Kuldar Sink’s award “Young Singer“ and “Young Musician” – 2005 – Oliver Kuusik (tenor), 2006 – René Soom (baritone), 2007 -Kädy Plaas (soprano), 2008 – Priit Volmer (basso), 2009 – Maria Veretenina (soprano), 2010 – Arete Teemets (soprano), 2011 – Andreas Lend (cello), 2012 – Kristel Pärtna (soprano), 2013 – Ivi Ots (violin), 2014 – Johan Randvere (piano), 2015 – Pärt Uusberg (conductor); the PLMF Patron Lord Carlisle’s award “Young Musician” – 2005 – Helen Lokuta (mezzo soprano), 2006 – Anna-Liisa Bezrodny (violin), 2007 – Mihkel Poll (piano), 2008 – Oksana Sinkova (flute) and the PLMF Vendor Estonia award “Young Conductor” – 2007 – Mikk Murdvee, 2008 – Lilyan Kaiv, 2009 – Risto Joost.

Festivals that are organized by PLMF

Since 2007 the Tallinn Winter Festival with the motto “Open your eyes, open your heart” has been held annually and since 2010 PLMF organizes the honorable Rapla Church Music Festival (including Rapla Summer School for string players, brass players, conductors and singers). PLMF is also organizing Väike-Maarja Music Festival (including the Vocalist Competition) and Eivere Piano Festival (including Summer School for pianists).

PLMF is leading many extensive cooperation projects (including European Union and Integration projects) and the trust is working with some of the biggest classical music international organizations.

In addition the PLMF arranges competitions, oratorio and opera performances as well as gala- concerts and other events where we present top soloists from Estonia and abroad. They also offer artists for business receptions and private functions all over Estonia and abroad.

PLMF helps to fill the events and gatherings organized by establishments, companies and civilians with live music.

PLMF is a part of the following umbrella organizations:

- International Artist Managers' Association (IAMA)
- International Society for the Performing Arts (ISPA)
- Estonian Association of Non-Profit Organizations and Foundations
- Estonian Music Festivals (through which also European Festivals Association)
- Estonian Music Council
