= Jaan Hargel =

Estonian conductor and musician

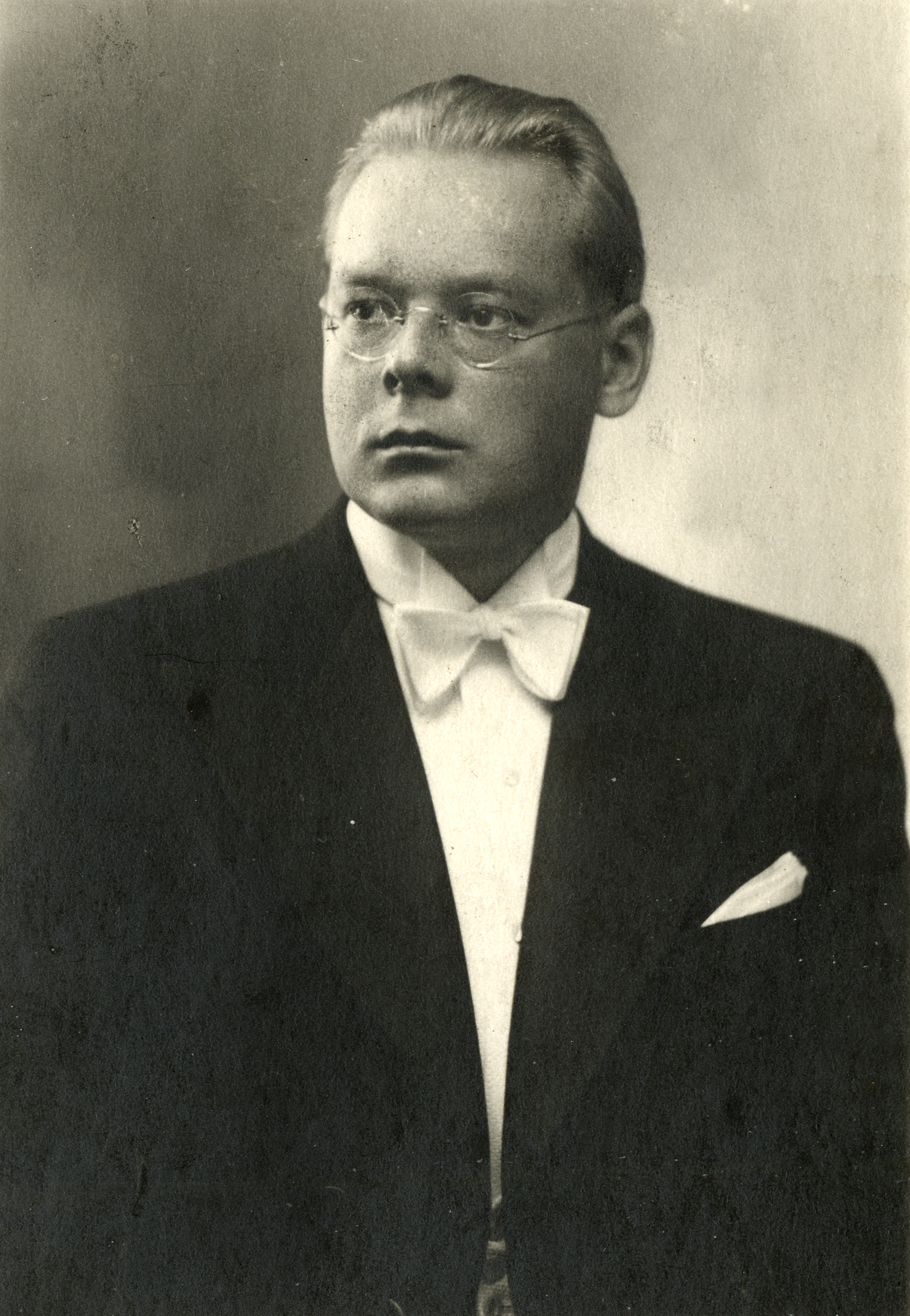
Jaan Hargel, oboist of the Symphony Orchestra of the State Broadcasting Company, September 1938.

Jaan (Joann) Hargel (30 November 1912 – 30 January 1966) was an Estonian conductor, music teacher, oboe and flute player.

== Education and career as an instrumentalist ==
Jaan Hargel's life as a musician began at the orchestra of Tallinn Secondary School of Science and continued at other orchestras in Tallinn where he played the piccolo, the flute, the oboe or the English horn. In 1940 he graduated from Tallinn Conservatoire (now the Estonian Academy of Music and Theatre) specialising in oboe in the class of Mikhail Prokofiev. During his studies, he also furthered his education at Helsinki Conservatoire (now the Sibelius Academy) under Professor Eero Viiki and played in the Finnish Radio Symphony Orchestra. From 1934–37 and 1941–44, he worked in the orchestra of the Estonia Theatre (now the Estonian National Opera) and from 1937–41 in the Symphony Orchestra of the State Broadcasting Company (now the Estonian National Symphony Orchestra).

== Career as a conductor ==
In 1944, Jaan Hargel was invited to play in the orchestra of the Vanemuine Theatre where, in the difficult post-war years, he could soon try his hand at conducting. His debut as a conductor was in 1944 with August Kitzberg's drama Before Cock's Crow at Dawn with incidental music by Richard Ritsing. This was soon followed by Leo Fall's operetta Der fidele Bauer and the first opera – Eugen Kapp's Flames of Revenge (1945). Conducting at the Vanemuine became Jaan Hargel's life's work – 22 years in total (1944–66), including six seasons (1946–52) as the principal conductor of the theatre.

More than 70 operas, ballets and operettas were staged at the Vanemuine under Jaan Hargel's conduction. His role at staging original works of Estonian music needs particular emphasis. He conducted the first productions of the Edgar Arro and Leo Normet's operetta Rummu Jüri (1954), Boris Kõrver's operetta Just a Dream (1955) and Gustav Ernesaks' opera Suitors from Mulgimaa (1960), which was played more than 130 times. Evald Aav's opera Vikings acquired particular significance for him. It was staged at the Vanemuine in 1955 with an orchestration renewed by him. Four years later, under his conduction, it became the first opera that was recorded in full in Estonia. Jaan Hargel orchestrated Gustav Ernesaks' opera Suitors from Mulgimaa and participated in making the new versions of Ernesaks' operas Baptism of Fire and Hand in Hand (with the new title Mari and Mihkel). The latter, conducted by Jaan Hargel, also completed the 1965 Song Festival in Tallinn as an open-air performance.

A lot of positive feedback was given to Jaan Hargel's conduction of Rossini's opera Il barbiere di Siviglia (1946), Mozart's Die Zauberflöte (1948), Leoncavallo's I pagliacci (1949), Tchaikovsky's Iolanta (1951), Verdi's Aida (1961), d'Albert's Tiefland (1963), and a number of extremely popular operettas, e.g. Strauss' Die Fledermaus (1949), Hervé's Mam'zelle Nitouche (1957), Raymond's Maske in Blau (1958), Kitzberg's farce with Eduard Oja's music Taylor Õhk and His Winning Lottery Ticket (1962), which in Hargel's lifetime was played for almost 140 times, and one of the most successful ballet productions of the Vanemuine throughout the times – Peer Gynt to Grieg's music (1959). Jaan Hargel's last production at the Vanemuine was Nicolai's opera Die lustige Weiber von Windsor (1965), which he could conduct for only a few times before his early death. In addition to theatre music, Jaan Hargel conducted symphony concerts and, if necessary, performed as a flute player under other conductors at symphony concerts or substituting for orchestra members who had fallen ill.

== Career as a teacher ==
Along with being a conductor and instrumentalist, he also worked as a music teacher until the end of his life. From 1940–44, he worked as an oboe teacher at Tallinn Conservatoire where his best-known student was Herman Talmre, the long-time principal oboist with the Estonian Radio Symphony Orchestra (now the Estonian National Symphony Orchestra). From 1946–49, he taught at Tartu Teachers' Training Institute (now the Institute of Educational Science at the University of Tartu) and from 1948–66 at Tartu Music School (now Tartu Heino Eller Music School) where his students were Heldur Värv, Alo Põldmäe (oboe), Jaan Õun, Peeter Rööp (flute), Ilmar Aasmets (bassoon), etc.

== Personal ==
Jaan Hargel's father Jaan Hargel (1887–1962), afterwards changed his name to Hargla, was an actor at Tallinn Drama Theatre, ballroom dancing instructor, football and athletics referee; his wife Alvi Hargel, up to 1947 Tilk (1911–1995), was a singer (mezzo-soprano) at the Vanemuine Theatre; his son Jaan Hargel (1948-2010) was an interior architect; his son Jüri Hargel (1952) is a flautist and flute teacher.

== Awards ==
- Estonian champion in water polo, 1928 and 1929.
- White Cross of the Third Class of the Estonian Defence League, 1939.
- Merited Art Worker of the Estonian SSR, 1965.

== Recordings ==
- LP Evald Aav. Opera Vikings. Scenes and arias. Melodiya, 1961.
- CD Evald Aav. Opera Vikings. SE & JS, 1997.
- CD Conductor Jaan Hargel. Compiled and produced by Jüri Hargel, 2012.

Numerous recordings in the archives of Estonian Public Broadcasting.

== Media coverage ==
- Aare Allikvee. Põhitöö, „kohakaaslus“, kõrvalharrastused. Edasi, 26 May 1963. (in Estonian)
- Elmar Uuk. ...on lõpuni kirjutatud. Edasi, 2 February 1966. (in Estonian)
- Malle Elvet. „Tal oli täpne avalöök ja suurepärane muusikatunnetus“. Muusikaleht, November 1997. (in Estonian)
- Tiiu Levald. Helisalvestis kui fakt, mälu toetaja ja tulevikusõnum. Sirp, 8 March 2013. (in Estonian)
