= Peeter Lilje =

Estonian conductor

Peeter Lilje (13 October 1950, Valga – 28 October 1993, Oulu) was an Estonian conductor for the Estonian National Symphony Orchestra (ERSO) and Estonian National Opera.

== Biography ==
In 1974, Lilje graduated from the Tallinn State Conservatory (now Estonian Academy of Music and Theater). In 1980, he graduated from the Rimsky-Korsakov St. Petersburg State Conservatory, studying under Arvids and Mariss Jansons. From 1984 to 1987, Lilje taught conducting at the Tallinn State Conservatory and conducted for their Symphony Orchestra. His students included conductors such as Vello Pahn, Arvo Volmer, Erki Pehk, and Lauri Sirp.

In 1973, Lilje worked as a choirmaster at the Estonian National Opera and then moved on to be an assistant for the conductor Neeme Jarvi. In 1975, Lilje made his debut performing Giuseppe Verdi's "La traviata". From 1980 to 1990, Lilje was the principal conductor of the Estonian National Opera. In 1976, Lilje made his debut at the Estonian National Symphony Orchestra (ERSO), conducting Eduard Tubin's IX Symphony. In 1990, he became the principal conductor for ERSO and continued until his death in 1993.

Awards:

- 1981: Merited Artist of the Estonian SSR
- 1987: People's Artist of the Estonian SSR
