= Aile Asszonyi =

Estonian soprano (born 1975)

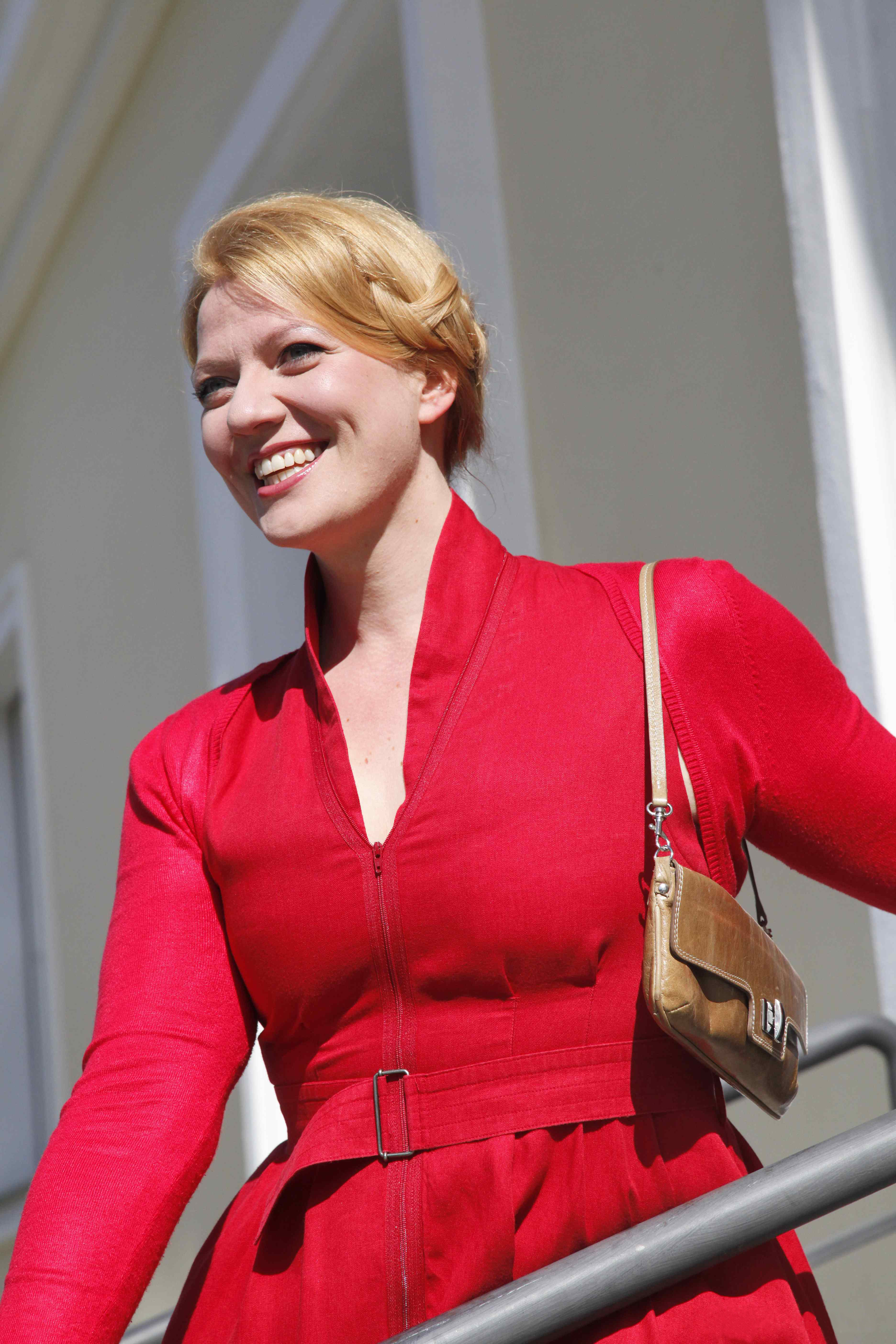
- Asszonyi in 2012
- Born: 22 July 1975 (age 51); Väike-Maarja, then part of Estonian SSR, Soviet Union
- Education: Estonian Academy of Music and Theatre
- Occupation: Operatic soprano
- Awards: Queen Elisabeth Competition; Estonian Theater Award

Aile Asszonyi (born 22 July 1975) is an Estonian soprano who has made an international career, known for dramatic roles such as Puccini's Turandot, Wagner's Senta and Elektra by Richard Strauss.

== Life and career ==
Asszonyi was born on 22 July 1975. Her mother Aino Asszonyi was an architect. Her maternal grandfather John Pori was a renowned orchestra leader and dance musician. She studied at the Estonian Academy of Music and Theatre in Tallinn with Matti Pelo and Helin Kapten, graduating in 2002. She studied further at the studio of the Dutch National Opera from 2002 to 2004, and the Carlo Bergonzi Accademia Verdiana in Busseto. She won the Prix des Donateurs at the Queen Elisabeth Competition in Brussels in 2004.

Asszonyi first sang in the Philharmonic Chamber Choir in Estonia. She made her stage debut in 2000 as Despina in Mozart's Così fan tutte at the Theater Vanemuine in Tartu. She participated in the world premieres of Isidora Žebeljan's operas Zora D and Dve glave i devojka. She was a member of the Estonian National Opera from 2010. Her roles include Haydn's Armida, Mozart's Fiordiligi, both Donna Anna and Donna Elvira in Don Giovanni, Adina in Donizetti's L'elisir d'amore, Verdi's Violetta and Giovanna d'Arco. She then ventured into more dramatic roles such as the title role in Beethoven's Fidelio, and both Elisabeth and Venus in Wagner's Tannhäuser. In Europe, she performed the roles of the Mother in Dallapiccola's Il prigioniero at the Oper Graz in 2016, Prothoe in Schoeck's Penthesilea at the Oper Bonn, and Abigaille in Verdi's Nabucco at Theater Regensburg. She appeared as Fata Morgana in Prokofiev's The Love for Three Oranges at Theater Koblenz, as both Wagner's Isolde and Puccini's Turandot at the Staatstheater Saarbrücken, and as Senta in Wagner's Der fliegende Holländer with De Nederlandse Reiseoper. She has sung with conductors such Neeme Järvi, Paavo Järvi and Dirk Kaftan and with directors such as Dmitry Bertman, Michiel Dijkema, Stefan Herheim, Roman Hovenbitzer, Tobias Kratzer, Peter Konwitschny, David Pountney, Daniel Slater, Nicola Raab and Andrejs Žagars.

In 2023 Asszonyi appeared in the title role of Elektra by Richard Strauss at the Oper Frankfurt, directed by Claus Guth and conducted by Sebastian Weigle. A reviewer noted that she was convincing from the beginning by both an "energetic voluminous high dramatic voice" and by stage presence, acting as a traumatised woman close to madness. Jan Brachmann from the FAZ experienced her as identifying with her character, and portraying in her monologue a woman with an unrealised capacity to love. At the Saarbrücken Opera (Saarländisches Staatstheater), she will take on the role of Brünnhilde in Wagner's "Der Ring des Nibelungen" from the 2023/2024 season.

She took part in the world premiere of Sofia Gubaidulina's oratorio Über Liebe und Hass / About Love and Hate both in Tallinn and at the Olavsdagene Festival in Trondheim.

Asszonyi was named best musician of the year 2007 by the Estonian Music Council, and was awarded the annual Estonian Theatre Award for the best operatic performance in 2009.

== Discography ==
- 2003 Tormis Vision of Estonia I Estonian National Male Chorus Alba records (UPC: 641713120175)
- 2011 Isidora Žebeljan Rukoveti Janáček Philharmonic Orchestra CPO label (CPO: 777 670-2)
- 2012 Van Gilse Symphony No. 3 Netherlands Symphony Orchestra CPO label (CPO: 777 518-2)
