= Concerto Grosso (Tamberg) =

1956 musical composition by Eino Tamberg

Eino Tamberg's Concerto Grosso, Op. 5, was composed in 1956. It was awarded a gold medal at the 6th World Festival of Youth and Students the following year and was subsequently performed through both the Eastern and Western Blocs, launching the Estonian composer's career.

Tamberg's Concerto Grosso is scored for a wind quintet consisting of flute, clarinet, trumpet, alto saxophone and bassoon, piano, percussion and a string orchestra, and consists of three movements lasting ca. 25 minutes:

1. Allegro moderato
2. Adagio
3. Allegro molto quasi toccata

A high-spirited neoclassical composition, it is representative of the mild modernism promoted by the Soviet regime though the Thaw after years of harsh artistic repression, and it is notable for its use of the saxophone, which had been banned in 1949 as a decadent instrument. Tamberg would use no less than three saxophones in his next composition, the Symphonic Dances.

== Quotes ==
Actually, I had no intention to write a concerto grosso; I just wanted to write a concerto. Since there were many skilful wind players in the orchestra of the Estonian Radio, I decided to use a wind ensemble. To get some edginess into the sound and rhythm, I added the piano and percussion. The title turned out wordy: Concerto for five wind instrument, piano, percussion and string orchestra. Only then did it come to my mind that at one time such ensemble concertos were called concerto grosso. This title may have influenced the style of the work. However, I had nothing to do with renewing an old genre. I merely wrote the kind of music I needed at that time.

== Sources ==
- Eino Tamberg: Joanna Tentata, Symphonic Dances, Concerto Grosso - Residentie Orkest, Neeme Järvi. BIS Records CD, 2010. Booklet notes by Merike Vaitmaa, pages 5–6.
