= Aivo Välja =

Estonian conductor (born 1968)

Aivo Välja (born 15 March 1968 in Tallinn) is an Estonian conductor.

== Life and career ==
He has graduated from Estonian Academy of Music and Theatre in symphony orchestra and choral conducting.

2001–2007, he was a conductor for Estonian National Opera. Since 2009, he has worked as principal conductor at Schleswig-Holstein Landestheater. Since 2011, he has also worked at Finnish National Opera.

He has conducted several world premieres of several Estonian composers, for example Lepo Sumera's "Musica profana", Eino Tamberg's "Journey for Strings", Tõnis Kaumann's "Op. 1/97".

Awards:

- 1993: winner of the orchestra conducting competition in Estonia
- 1996: diploma for a successful performance at the Prokofiev Competition in St. Petersburg
