= Paul Mägi =

Estonian conductor (born 1953)

- Born: 13 October 1953 (age 72); Tallinn, then part of Estonian SSR, Soviet Union
- Education: Tallinn State Conservatory
- Occupations: Jazz violinist; Conductor; Academic teacher
- Organizations: Estonian Radio; Latvian National Symphony Orchestra; Latvian Academy of Music; Estonian National Opera; Estonian Academy of Music and Theatre; Vanemuine

Paul Mägi (born 13 October 1953) is an Estonian conductor in concert and opera and is also an academic teacher and violinist. He has commissioned works for the Estonian National Opera.

== Life and music ==
Born in Tallinn (then Soviet Union), Mägi achieved his Abitur at the 42nd secondary school in Tallinn, today's Deutsches Gymnasium Tallinn (Tallinna Saksa Gümnaasium), in the district of Mustamäe. He graduated from the Tallinn Music High School in 1972, where he specialised in violin with Endel Lippus and in trumpet with Tõnu Tarum. He studied trumpet at the Tallinn State Conservatory with Tõnu Tarum, finishing in 1980. He studied further at the Moscow Conservatory, conducting with Gennady Rozhdestvensky, where he graduated from in 1984.

=== Conducting ===
Mägi founded a chamber orchestra for the Estonian Radio, which was named the Estonian Radio Chamber Orchestra in 1978. He conducted it until 1984.

Mägi was musical director and chief conductor of the Latvian National Symphony Orchestra (Latvijas Nacionālais simfoniskais orķestris) in Riga from 1990 to 1994. From 1995 to 1997, Mägi was artistic director of the Estonian theatre which was then named the Estonian National Opera. He was its first artistic director and principal conductor from 1998. He commissioned operas from Estonian composers, such as Rene Eespere's Gurmans and Raimo Kangro's Heart. He introduced recordings of operas, including Verdi's Nabucco and Eino Tamberg's Cyrano de Bergerac in 2000, which led to the first recording of Tamberg's opera.

From 2004, Mägi has been the conductor of the symphony orchestra of the Estonian Academy of Music and Theatre and also of the Uppsala Kammarorkester, a chamber orchestra based in Uppsala. He also performs as a jazz violinist. From the 2010/11 season, he has been chief conductor of the Vanemuine theatre in Tartu.

He has conducted several Estonian orchestras, such as the Estonian National Symphony Orchestra. He conducted premiere recordings, such as Eduard Tubin's opera Reigi õpetaja in 1992 and Erkki-Sven Tüür's Second Symphony in 2004.

=== Teaching ===
Mägi was a teacher of conducting at the Latvian Academy of Music from 1991 to 1994. He has taught conducting at the Estonian Academy of Music and Theatre from 1989. He has given master classes internationally, including the Stockholm Royal College of Music. His students have included Olari Elts, Mihhail Gerts, Lehari Kaustel, Thomas Kemp, Erki Pehk, Pauls Putninš, and Aivo Välja.

== Awards ==
In 1985, Mägi received the Estonian Prize for Young Musicians. In 1994 he was awarded the Cultural Award of the Republic of Latvia. In 1994, 1996, and 1999 Mägi was awarded the prize of the Estonian Music Theatre Union, and in 2000 the Cultural Prize of the Republic of Estonia, among others.
