= Band of the Estonian Defence Forces =

Musical unit in the Estonian Defence Forces

- Military band
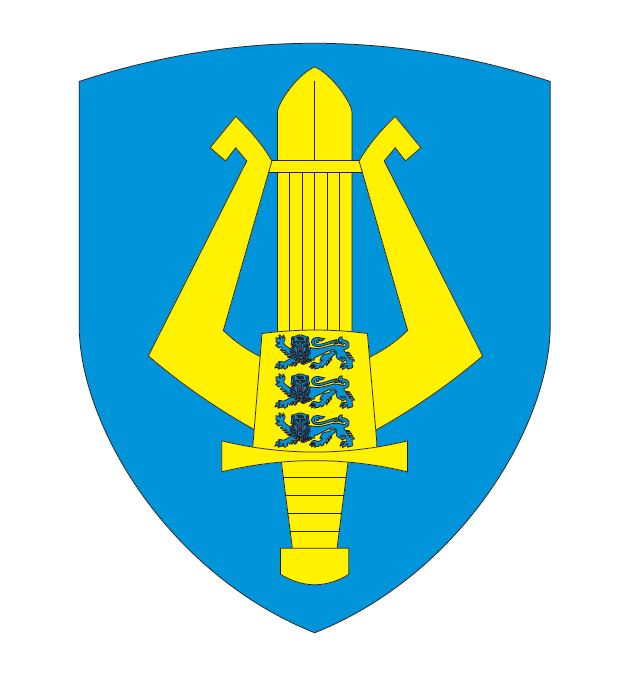
- Native name: Kaitseväe orkester
- Short name: EKV orkester
- Former name: Tallinn Garrison Band
- Founded: 1 February 1993; 33 years ago
- Location: Tatari Street, Tallinn, Estonia
- Principal conductor: Captain Simmu Vasar
- Website: www.mil.ee/et/kaitsevagi/toetuse-vaejuhatus/kaitsevae-orkester

The Kaitseväe orkester, known in Anglophone countries as the Band of the Estonian Defence Forces, is the official military band service of the Estonian Defence Forces. The main task of the band is to play music at all national and military ceremonies. The band's repertoire includes mostly classical and marching music. It is currently made up of 40 musicians. From 1996 to 2019, the conductor of the band was Lieutenant Colonel Peeter Saan. Each year, the band takes part in about 220 concerts, festivals, and ceremonial parades of the Defence Forces (such as the annual independence day parade in Tallinn). It has also performed at venues abroad in countries like Lithuania, France and Germany. Traditionally, the band holds Autumn and Spring concerts in the Estonia Concert Hall.

== History ==
=== 1918-1993 ===
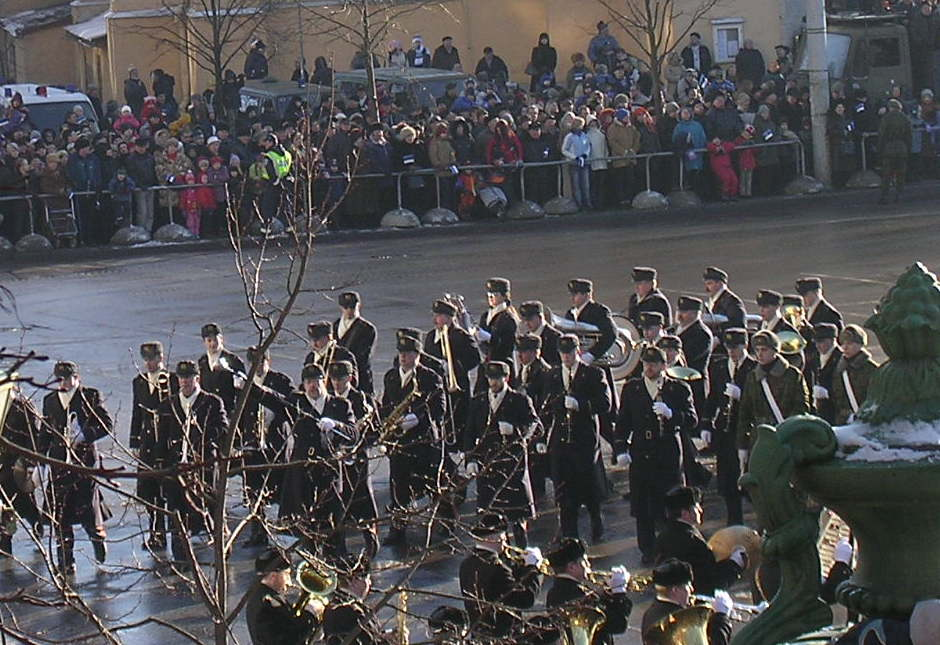
The band on Vabaduse Square during the Independence Day Parade in 2004.

On November 24, 1918, the first independent Estonian military band was formed from the 1st Infantry Regiment of the newly formed Estonian Defense Forces. A few months later, the young band was subordinated to the Ministry of War and became the official military band of the ministry. The ministry then appointed Georg Reder to become the first director of music. In 1929, it was renamed to the Central Band of the Ministry of Defense and again in 1934 to the Tallinn Garrison Band. The band was dissolved during the Nazi occupation of Estonia. After World War II, the Soviet government in Estonia replaced the orchestra with the massed bands of Tallinn Military Garrison under the Baltic Military District.

=== 1993-2021 ===
Following the fall of the Soviet Union, the band was officially reestablished on 29 January 1993 by order of Colonel Ants Laaneots and it began its activities on 1 February. At the basis of the band, many of its first personnel having received both local and foreign musician training in the Soviet Union. Others were also former members of the Tallinn City Brass Band. It would make its first appearance 3 weeks later at the Independence Day Parade on Freedom Square in Tallinn. It also made its first foreign appearance in France and Germany the following year. Since 2014, the band is a support formation that reports directly to EDF General Headquarters. Until then, the band was subordinated to the Northern Defense District

=== 2021 reorganization ===
In May 2021, the EDF Commander Martin Herem announced that from 1 September, cuts would be made to the band, in which "40 professional musicians will lose their jobs at the same time." This came as part of personnel cuts made by the Kaja Kallas' government. Later in the month, Defense Minister Kalle Laanet proposed to Interior Minister Kristian Jaani and Culture Minister Anneli Ott that the band be transferred alongside the Band of the Police and Border Guard Board to the administrative control of the Estonian War Museum in Viimsi. In addition, the over €one million used to maintain the band will be cut by over half, and the number of musicians will be reduced to 33.

== Insignia ==
The active members and conscripts of the Defense Forces Band wear the field uniform and the band's emblem on the right shoulder of the band's blue uniform. Conductors and staff of the band wear gold or orange double sheepskin trousers on their trousers. The band wears three orange cross stripes on the regular six-sleeved elbow to cuff. The uniform also includes an axelbant, which is golden for conductors and orange for musicians. The design of the usual form of the band has been restored from that used since 1937 by the Band of the Tallinn Garrison, whose lineage is continued on by the current band. In addition to the regular and outdoor uniforms, bandsmen also wear a festive black evening uniform with a golden velvet stripe as the mess dress.

== Conscripts ==
Each year, the Defense Forces Band recruits up to 20 conscripts after completing a shooting course (formerly SBK). The further career of conscripts consists of line drum training and performances with smaller ensembles (rock band, vocal ensemble). The repertoire of the conscript band is diverse, its arrangements include soldier songs as well as well-known hits by Estonian and foreign artists. The spring highlight of conscripts in recent years has been a performance at Veteranirock on Vabaduse Square in Tallinn. The main task of the band's conscripts is to popularize military service in the Defense Forces.

== Commanders of the Kaitseväe orkester ==
- Captain Aivar Raigla (1993–1994)
- Lieutenant Colonel Indrek Toompere (1994–1996)
- Lieutenant Colonel Peeter Saan (1996–2019)
- Captain Simmu Vasar (2019–Present)

== Notable ceremonial marches ==
Title	Author
Mu isamaa, mu õnn ja rõõm	Fredrik Pacius
Pidulik signal	N/A
Pidulik marss	Eero Liives
Eesti lipp	N/A
Võidu Teel	Rein Ploom
Hoia Jumal Eestit	N/A
Björneborgarnas marsch (Porilaste marss)	Unknown
Põhjalaagri marss	N/A
Politsei marss	Juri Maimik
Pidulik Eesti marss	Eduard Tamm
Homeland	Eero Liives
Festive March	Eero Liives
Military School March	August Arro

== See also ==
- Estonian Defence Forces
- Military band
