= Cyrano de Bergerac (Tamberg) =

Opera by Eino Tamberg, 1976

- Opera by Eino Tamberg
- Librettist: Jaan Kross
- Language: Estonian
- Based on: Play Cyrano de Bergerac by Edmond Rostand
- Premiere: 2 July 1976; Estonia Theatre, Tallinn

Cyrano de Bergerac, Op. 45, subtitled A Romantic Opera, is an opera in three acts and an epilogue created in 1974 by Estonian composer Eino Tamberg. The libretto is by Jaan Kross and is based on the 1897 play of Edmond Rostand. The premiere was on 2 July 1976 in the Estonia Theatre in Tallinn.

== History ==
Estonia Theatre, home of the Estonian National Opera

Eino Tamberg was music director at the Tallinn Drama Theatre from 1952, worked as a sound engineer for the Estonian Radio from 1953, was a consultant in the Estonian Union of Composers from 1960, and taught composition at the Estonian Music and Theatre Academy from 1968. He composed Cyrano de Bergerac, an opera in three acts and an epilogue, in 1974, setting a libretto that Jaan Kross based on Rostand 's 1897 play. The composer said in an interview that he was attracted to the title character, who had "a subtle nature of a poet" and was "a bold sword fighter. His scale of emotions ranges from poignant humour to the deepest of tragedies". The premiere was on 2 July 1976 in the Estonia Theatre in Tallinn. It was revived in Tallinn in 1995 and 2005 and was the first Estonian stage production broadcast internationally by Euroradio.

== Roles ==
Role	Voice type	Recording cast
Cyrano de Bergerac, poet and cadet	baritone	Sauli Tiilikainen
Roxane, Cyrano's cousin	soprano	
Christian de Neuvillette, a young cadet	tenor	Mati Kõrts
Count de Guiche	baritone	Jassi Zahharov
Roxane's duenna	mezzo-soprano	Riina Airenne
Captain Castel-Jaloux, commander of the Gascon company, Cyrano's friend	baritone	Rauno Elp
Ragueneau, baker and poet	tenor	Juhan Tralla
Lise, his wife	soprano	Margit Saulep
The Friar	tenor	Ivo Kuusk
Three tattered poets	tenor, baritone, bass	Väino Karo, Priit Kruusement, Ain Anger
Two cadets	tenor, baritone	Mart Madiste, Märt Jakobson
Two sentinels	tenor, baritone	Ants Kollo, Priit Kruusement

== Recording ==
The opera was broadcast live from the Tallinn opera house in 1995, with music by the Estonian National Opera. It was recorded in 2000 with the same cast in the major roles at the Estonia Concert Hall. A reviewer noted the conductor's ability to enjoy romanticism without triviality, and good work from the orchestra. He wrote that Tiilikainen delivered a convincing portrait of the hero's character, and that Huhta's part was inspired by Monteverdi's music, from the period when the action takes place.
