= Viini postmark =

1968 film directed by Veljo Käsper

- Directed by: Veljo Käsper
- Written by: Ardi Liives
- Starring: Jüri Järvet; Herta Elviste; Ines Parker; Vladislav Koržets; Alfred Rebane; Fleur Toomla
- Cinematography: Harri Rehe
- Music by: Jaan Rääts
- Production company: Tallinnfilm
- Release date: 10 January 1968
- Running time: 91 minutes
- Country: Estonia
- Language: Estonian

Viini postmark (English: Postmark from Vienna) is a 1968 Estonian comedy film directed by Veljo Käsper and based on the play of the same name by Ardi Liives.

In several Estonian TOP films charts, the film is included.

== Cast ==
- Jüri Järvet - Martin Roll
- Herta Elviste - Elma, Martin's spouse
- Ines Parker - Ulvi, Roll's daughter
