= Daniel Slater =

Daniel Slater may refer to:

- Dan Slater (born 1976), New Zealand Olympic sailor
- Daniel Slater (director) (born 1966), British opera director
