= Risto Joost =

Estonian conductor and opera singer

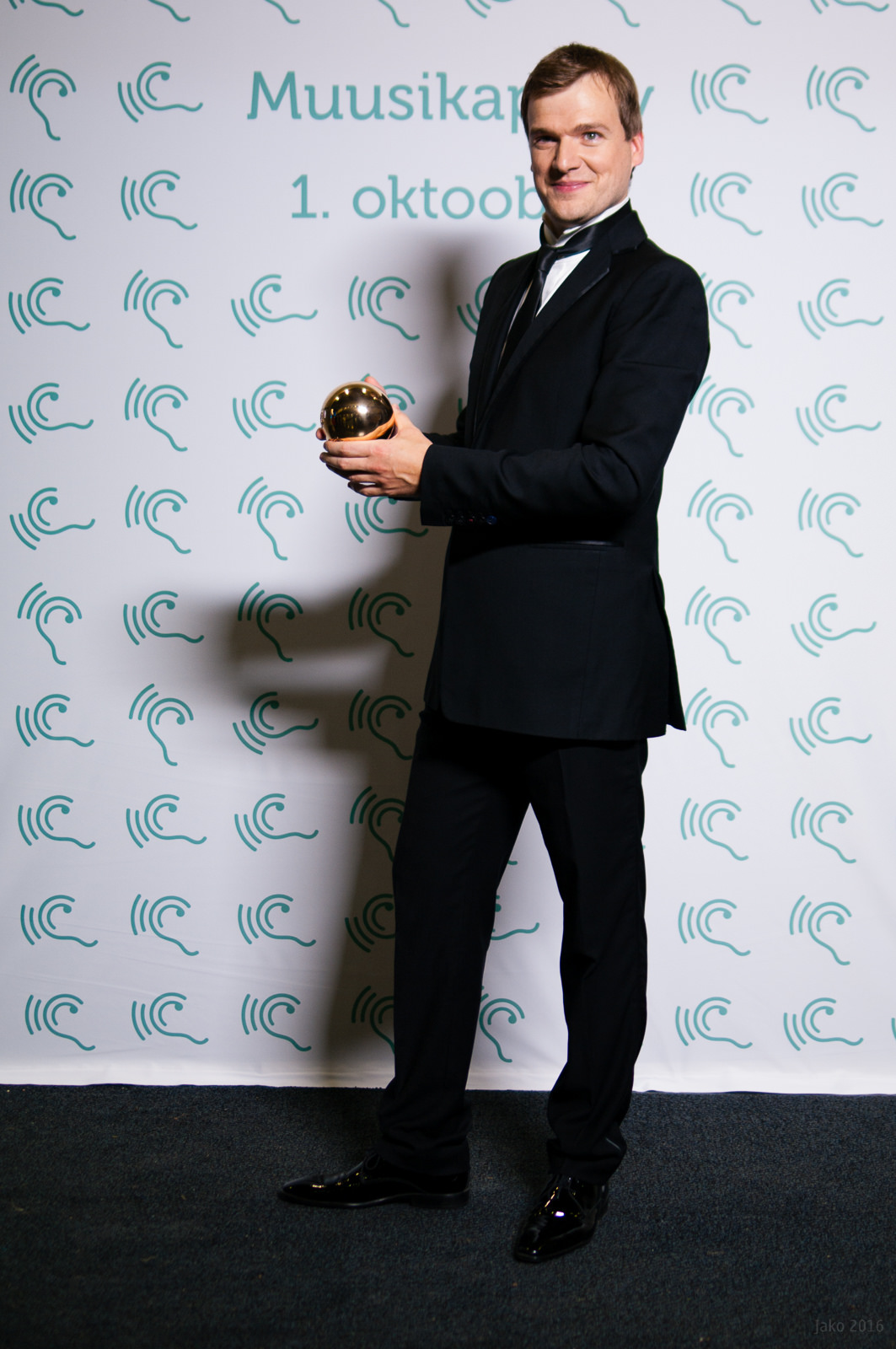
Risto Joost (2016)

Risto Joost (born 22 June 1980) is an Estonian conductor and operatic countertenor.

== Life ==
Born in Tallinn, Joost has been intensively involved with music since the age of six. He attended the special school for music in Tallinn. From 1986 to 1998 he studied choir conducting at the Tallinn Academy of Music with Anneli Mäeots and from 1998 to 2002 at the Estonian Academy of Music and Theatre. Conducting with Kuno Areng, Jüri Alperten and Paul Mägi as well as singing with Uku Joller and Nadja Kurem. In 2002 and 2003 he studied choral conducting with Erwin Ortner and conducting with Leopold Hager at the University of Music and Performing Arts Vienna. In spring 2008 he completed his studies at the Royal College of Music, Stockholm under Jorma Panula. Master classes followed with Neeme Järvi and Esa-Pekka Salonen.

From 2008 to 2011 he conducted the "Tallinn Sinfonietta", since 2013 he has conducted the "Tallinn Chamber Orchestra". He has been principal conductor of the Estonian National Choir since 2009, of the Nederlands Kamerkoor since 2011 and of the "Tallinn Chamber Orchestra" since 2013. From the 2015/2016 concert season to the 2018/2019 concert one, he was artistic director of the MDR Rundfunkchor in Leipzig.
