= Eino Tamberg =

Estonian composer (1930–2010)

- Born: 27 May 1930; Tallinn, Estonia
- Died: 24 December 2010 (aged 80); Tallinn, Estonia
- Education: Tallinn Conservatory
- Occupations: Composer; academic teacher
- Organizations: Estonian Academy of Music
- Awards: Estonian State Cultural Awards

Eino Tamberg (27 May 1930 – 24 December 2010) was an Estonian composer whose works are performed internationally. He composed operas such as Cyrano de Bergerac, four symphonies, and several concertos. He taught composition for decades at the Estonian Academy of Music.

== Life ==
Tamberg was born in Tallinn. He studied composition with Eugen Kapp at the Tallinn Conservatory, from which he graduated in 1953. From 1952, he worked as music director at the Tallinn Drama Theatre, and from 1953 to 1957 he was a sound engineer for Estonian Radio. As a composer, he first attracted attention with the song cycle Viis romanssi Sándor Petöfi luulele (1955), based on poetry by Sándor Petőfi, and with his Concerto Grosso (1956), for which he won a gold medal at an international music festival in Moscow. Tamberg was one of the principal initiators of the anti-romantic composition movement of the late 1950s. His approach to composition was associated with the so-called New Wave in Estonian music. From around 1960, he became better known outside Estonia, writing in a wide range of genres, though especially for theatre and symphonic music.

From 1969, he taught at the Estonian Academy of Music, where he was appointed professor in 1983. Among his students were Raimo Kangro, Margo Kõlar, Urmas Lattikas, Alo Mattiisen, Toivo Tulev, Peeter Vähi and Mari Vihmand. During the 1997/98 season, he was composer-in-residence with the Estonian National Symphony Orchestra. He died in Tallinn.

== Work ==
Tamberg was one of the most important representatives of neoclassicism in Estonian music, though his later works were more expressionistic in style. Two of Tamberg's notable works are the ballet Joanna tentata (1971) and the Trumpet Concerto No. 1 (1972). The Trumpet Concerto remains one of his most popular works and was performed not only in Europe, but also in New York, Hong Kong and Singapore, and was recorded by Philip Smith with The New York Philharmonic and by Håkan Hardenberger. Tamberg also wrote four symphonies, a violin concerto (1981), saxophone concerto (1987), clarinet concerto (1996), a second trumpet concerto (1997), bassoon concerto (2000) and cello concerto (2001).

His second opera, Cyrano de Bergerac, premiered in 1976. This romantic work shows the influence of early Baroque conventions and bel canto singing. It consists of three acts and an epilogue (Op. 45) and was written in 1974 using a libretto by Jaan Kross, based on the play by Edmond Rostand.

On the occasion of the 50th anniversary of the United Nations in 1995, he wrote his Celebration Fanfares, which premiered in New York City and was conducted by Neeme Järvi. He was awarded an Estonian State Cultural Award in 2007 for his lifetime achievements.

=== Compositions ===
- Vürst Gabriel (Prince Gabriel), suite, 1955
- Concerto Grosso, Op. 5, 1956
- Ballet Symphony, 1959
- Poiss ja liblikas (The Boy and the Butterfly), ballet, 1963
- Raudne kodu (Iron Home), opera, 1965
- Music for the film Külmale maale (To the Cold Land), 1965
- Joanna tentata, ballet, 1970
- Trumpet Concerto, 1972
- Cyrano de Bergerac, opera, 1974
- Symphony No. 1, 1978
- Amores, oratorio, 1981
- Symphony No. 2, 1982
- Lend (The Fly), opera, 1983
- Symphony No. 3, 1987
- Fanfare (Celebration Fanfares), 1995
- Sentimental Journey with a Clarinet, 1996
- Desiderium Concordia (Longing for Unity), after 1997
- Symphony No. 4, 1998
