= Ailes =

Ailes or aile may refer to:

== People ==
With this given name

- Ailes Gilmour, pioneer of the American Modern Dance movement of the 1930s
- Aile Asszonyi (born 1975)

Surnamed

- Roger Ailes (1940–2017), president of America's Fox News Channel and chairman of the Fox Television Stations Group
- Stephen Ailes (1912–2001), United States Secretary of the Army between 1964 and 1965

Other people

- Sts'Ailes, First Nations people in the Lower Mainland of the Canadian province of British Columbia

=== Fictional characters ===
- Aile (Mega Man ZX character)

== Other uses ==
- Aile (TV series), a 2023–2024 Turkish drama series
- Aile Castle, Vevey, Vaud, Switzerland
- Les Ailes de la Mode (Les Ailes), a department store chain in the province of Quebec, Canada
  - Complexe Les Ailes (Montreal) (Ailes), a shopping mall in downtown Montreal named after Les Ailes de la Mode

== See also ==
- Des racines et des ailes, French television documentary series
