= Helen Lokuta =

Estonian opera singer (born 1975)

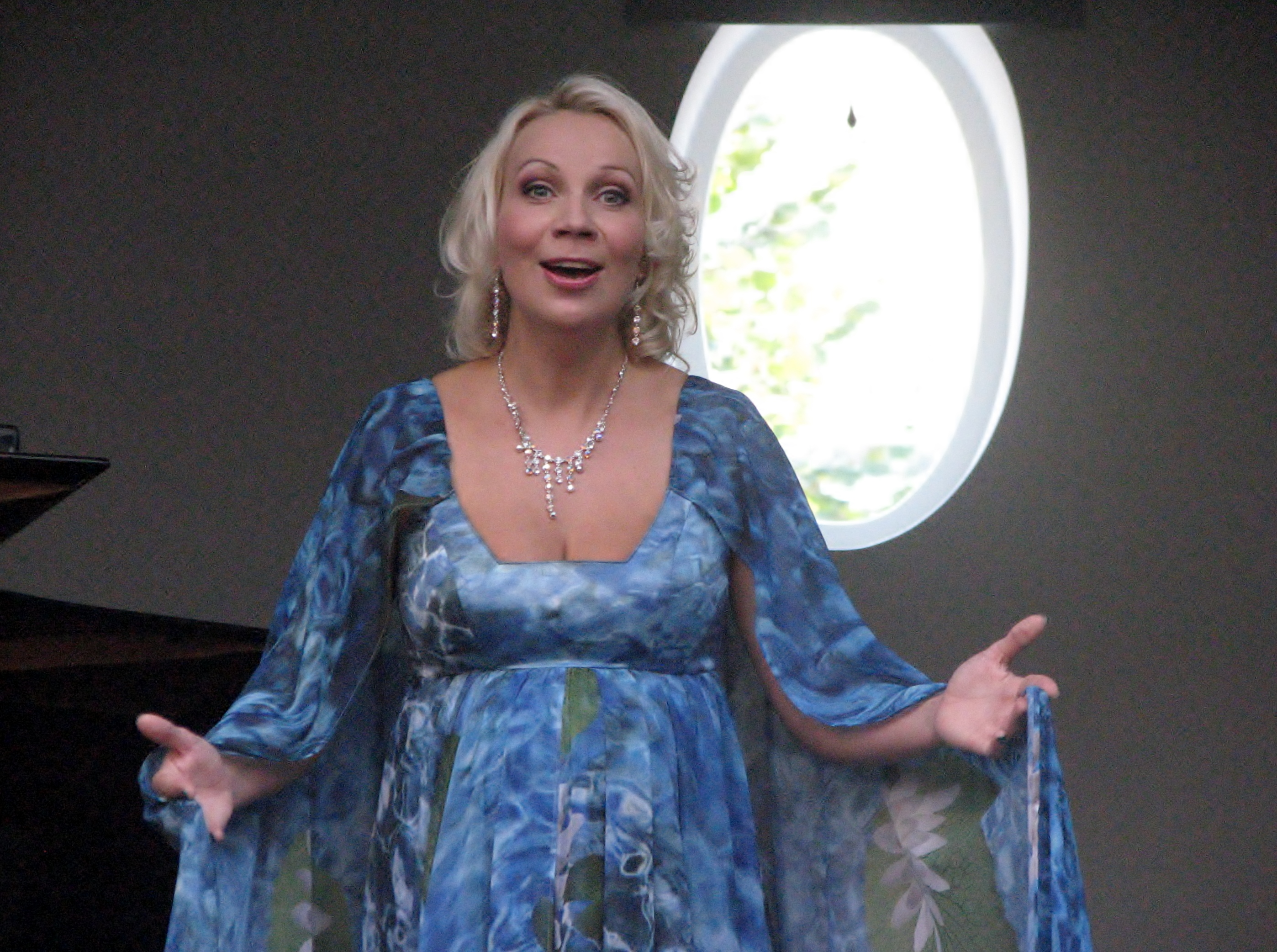
- Helen Lokuta (2013)

Background information
- Born: 12 April 1975 (age 51); Tartu, then part of Estonian SSR, Soviet Union
- Occupation: opera singer
- Years active: 2006–present

Helen Lokuta (born 12 April 1975 in Tartu) is an Estonian opera singer (mezzo-soprano).

Lokuta studied in Music Class at Tartu 7th High School (currently Karlova Gymnasium) and graduated from Aino Kõiv’s violin class at the Heino Eller Tartu Music School in 1997. She has also studied in Karlsruhe University of Music in 2000 and Karlsruhe Opera Highschool in 2001 with Prof. Maria Venuti. In 2002 she graduated with a bachelor's degree from Estonian Academy of Music and Theatre with Pille Lill and Prof. Tamara Novitšenko. In 2014 she obtained magister's degree from Estonian Academy of Music and Theatre with Jaakko Ryhänen.

Since 2004 she has participated in Tõnu Kaljuste’s project Nargen Opera. From 2001 to 2006 Helen Lokuta has worked as free-lance/guest soloist and since 2006 as a soloist at the Estonian National Opera.

== Awards ==
- 1994 1st prize in Estonian Youth Singers Competition
- 2005 2nd prize in International vocalists competition in Lithuanian Academy of Music and Theatre
- 2005 Young Musician of the Year from the Pille Lill Music Fund
- 2007 Annual Prize of Estonian Teatre Union
- 2007 Estonian Cultural Endowment prize
- 2011, 2015 and 2019 SEB Audience Award

== Roles ==
- Georges Bizet "Carmen" (Carmen)
- Rimskij-Korsakov "Tsaari Mõrsja" (Ljubaša)
- Giuseppe Verdi "La Traviata" (Flora)
- Pjotr Tšaikovski "Padaemand" (Polina)
- Wolfgang Mozart “Le nozze di Figaro” (Cherubino)
- Emmerich Kálmán “Die Csardasfürstin” (Silva)
- George Händel “Julius Caesar” (Cleopatra)
