= Ivari Ilja =

Estonian pianist

Ivari Ilja (born 3 May 1959 in Tallinn) is an Estonian pianist trained at the Moscow Conservatory under Vera Gornostayeva and Sergei Dorensky best known for his work as an accompanist.

He holds positions as Chairman of the Board of the Estonian Association of Professional Musicians and President of the Estonian Music Council.

Ilja has been teaching piano since 1986 and served as the head of the piano department at the Estonian Academy of Music and Theatre from 2000 to 2015.

He is the rector of the Estonian Academy of Music and Theatre.
