= Vello Pähn =

Estonian conductor

Vello Pähn in 2013

Vello Pähn (born 30 May 1958) is an Estonian conductor.

Since 2012 he is the principal conductor and artistic director at the Estonian National Opera.

In 2016 he received Estonian Music Council's Prize under the category "Interpretation Prize".
