= Karita Mattila =

Finnish operatic soprano (born 1960)

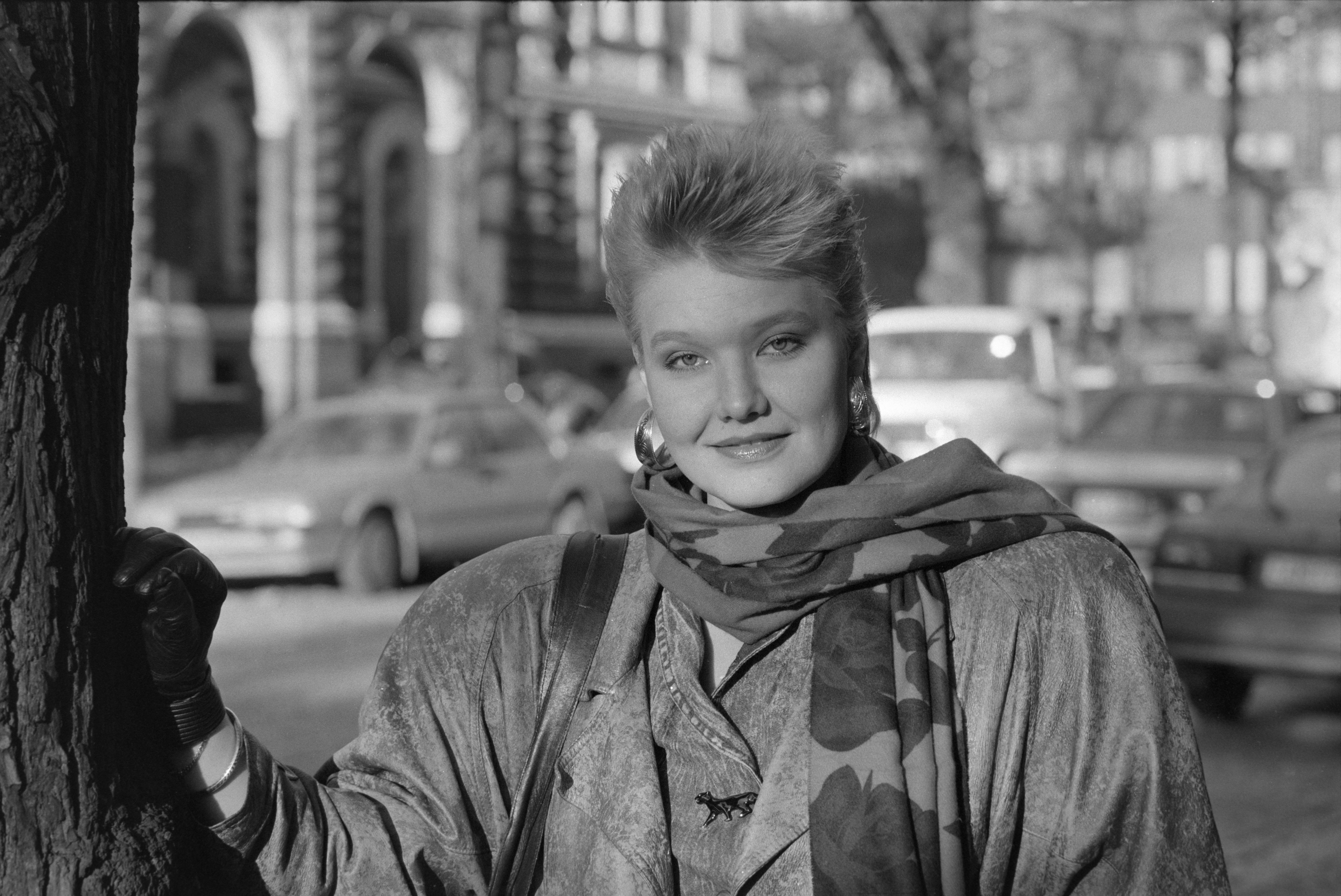
- Mattila in 1988
- Born: 5 September 1960; Somero, Finland
- Occupation: Operatic soprano
- Awards: Order of the Lion of Finland

Karita Marjatta Mattila (born 5 September 1960) is a Finnish operatic soprano.

Mattila appears regularly in the major opera houses worldwide, including the Metropolitan Opera, the Royal Opera House in London, Théâtre du Châtelet, Opéra Bastille, the Lyric Opera of Chicago, San Francisco Opera, Houston Grand Opera, Vienna State Opera, Toronto Roy Thomson Hall, and Großes Festspielhaus in Salzburg.

== Career ==
Born in Somero, Mattila graduated 1983 from the Sibelius Academy in Helsinki, where she studied singing with Liisa Linko-Malmio. She then continued her studies with Vera Rózsa in London.

Also in 1983, Mattila won the first Cardiff Singer of the World Competition. In 1985, she made her Royal Opera House, Covent Garden debut as Fiordiligi in Mozart's Così fan tutte.

She was seen as Emma in the first ever televised production of Schubert's Fierrabras at the Vienna State Opera in 1988. In 1990 she made her Metropolitan Opera debut as Donna Elvira in Mozart's Don Giovanni.

In 1994, she made her Spanish debut as Tatyana in Tchaikovsky's Eugene Onegin in Madrid, and 1996 debuts in Paris in Wagner's Lohengrin and Verdi's Don Carlos.

Mattila has won Grammy Awards for "Best Opera Recording" for Wagner's Die Meistersinger von Nürnberg in 1998 and for Janacek's Jenůfa in 2004. She was awarded the Evening Standard Ballet, Opera and Classical Music Award for "Outstanding Performance of the Year" in 1998 for her performance of Elisabeth in Verdi's Don Carlos at the Royal Opera House.

In 2001 The New York Times chose Karita Mattila as the best singer of the year for her performance in te title role of Beethoven's Fidelio at the Metropolitan Opera, and in the same year she was nominated for the Laurence Olivier Award "Outstanding Achievement in Opera".

Mattila's 2004 New York performances in Salome and subsequent Káťa Kabanová inspired the New York press to write: "When the history of the Metropolitan Opera around the time of the millennium is written, Karita Mattila will deserve her own chapter."

In 2005, she was named Musician of the Year 2005 by Musical America, which describes her "the most electrifying singing actress of our day, the kind of performer who renews an aging art form and drives the public into frenzies." BBC Music Magazine named Mattila as one of the top 20 sopranos of the recorded era in 2007.

Worldwide audiences saw Mattila in Puccini's Manon Lescaut live in movie theatres in 2008. Salome by Richard Strauss and Puccini:s Tosca were seen live from the house in High Definition worldwide in 2008 and 2009, respectively.

In 2010 at Opéra National de Lyon, Mattila created the role of Émilie du Châtelet in Kaija Saariaho's monodrama Émilie, which was dedicated to her.

In 2014, Mattila was scheduled to sing Four Last Songs by R. Strauss with the Munich Philharmonic at Carnegie Hall. However, when Valery Gergiev, who had publicly supported Vladimir Putin's stance on Ukraine and gay rights, was brought in to conduct, she refused to perform if he remained. Gergiev was replaced with Fabio Luisi. Mattila received threats for her action.

In 2020, Mattila played a parody of herself as an opera diva stuck in Finland, in the new comic opera Covid fan tutte.

In December 2020 Mattila was awarded the Order of the Lion of Finland, Commander, First Class.

== Personal life ==
Mattila lives in Naples, Florida. Before moving to Florida in the mid-2000s, she lived in London, England, for about twenty years.

In 1988 she met and, in 1992, married Tapio Kuneinen, who served as her manager. They divorced in February 2019.

She has been active on Twitter since October 2018, and has stated that it was a "lifesaver" after her divorce.

Upon the abrupt cancellation of her Jenůfa at the Royal Opera House in late February 2020 because of the COVID-19 pandemic, she moved to an apartment in Helsinki, Finland, until she was able to travel and work safely again and return home. She returned to Florida in April 2021.

== Recordings ==
=== Solo recitals ===
- Arias & Scenes (Erato) cond. Yutaka Sado; Queen of Spades, Jenufa, Elektra.
- German Romantic Arias (Erato), Staatskapelle Dresden, cond. Sir Colin Davis; Beethoven, Weber.

Lieder

- Strauss: Orchestral Songs; Four Last Songs (DG)
- Strauss: Orchestral Songs (Sony Music Entertainment)
- Strauss: Hölderlin Lieder (Sony Music Entertainment)
- Sibelius Songs (Ondine)
- Grieg and Sibelius Songs (Erato)
- Lollipops; Canteloube, Villa-Lobos (Philips)
- Sydän Suomessa – From the Heart of Finland (Ondine), 1996, recital with Ilmo Ranta (piano); songs by Toivo Kuula, Oskar Merikanto, Erkki Melartin, Yrjö Kilpinen and folk songs.
- Wild Rose (Ondine) with Ilmo Ranta. Lieder by Beethoven, Brahms, Schubert, Schumann, Mahler.
- Modern Portrait (Warner/Finlandia), 1995. Paul Hindemith Das Marienleben, song cycle for soprano & piano, Op. 27; Aulis Sallinen Dream Songs; Mikko Heinio song cycle Vuelo de Alambre

Live

- Karita Live! (Ondine) cond. Jukka Pekka Saraste; Wagner, Verdi, Strauss, Gershwin
- Helsinki Recital (Ondine), Martin Katz (piano); Duparc, Kaija Saariaho Quatre instants, Rachmaninov, Dvořák Gypsy songs.

Compilations

- Excellence – The Artistry of Karita Mattila (Ondine)

=== Complete operas ===
- Salome (Sony Music Entertainment)
- Káťa Kabanová (Fra Musica)
- Tosca (Virgin)
- Manon Lescaut (EMI Classics)
- Don Carlos (EMI Classics)
- Fidelio (DG)
- Die Meistersinger (Decca, DG)
- Simon Boccanegra (TDK)
- Jenůfa (Erato)
- Le nozze di Figaro (Sony Music Entertainment)
- Così fan tutte (Philips)
- Don Giovanni (Philips)
- Fierrabras (DG)
- Der Freischütz (Decca)
- Scenes from Goethe's Faust (Sony Music Entertainment)

=== Symphonic works ===
- Mozart: Requiem (DG)
- Beethoven: Symphony no. 9 (DG)
- Shostakovich: Symphony no. 14 (EMI Classics)
- Schoenberg: Gurrelieder (EMI Classics)
- Bernstein: Symphony no. 3 (Erato)
- Sibelius: Kullervo (BIS)
- Mendelssohn: Symphony no. 2 (DG)
- Schubert: Mass in E flat major; Mozart: Aria of the Angel, Laudate dominum (DG)

=== Popular music ===
- Fever (Ondine)
- Best of Evergreens (Ondine)
- Karita's Christmas (Ondine)
- Songs To The Sea; Popular Melodies by Lasse Mårtenson (2001)

=== DVDs ===
- James Levine's 25th Anniversary Metropolitan Opera Gala (1996), Deutsche Grammophon DVD, B0004602-09

== Repertory ==
Role	Opera	Composer	Place	Date
Emma	Fierrabras	Schubert	Vienna State Opera	1988
Donna Elvira	Don Giovanni	Mozart	Vienna State Opera	1990
Donna Elvira	Don Giovanni	Mozart	Metropolitan Opera	1990
Rosalinde	Die Fledermaus	Johann Strauss II	Vienna State Opera & Tokyo NHK	1994
Amelia	Simon Boccanegra	Verdi	Teatro Colón	1995
Elsa	Lohengrin	Wagner	Paris Opera	1996
Elisabeth	Don Carlos	Verdi	Théâtre du Châtelet	1996
Hanna Glawari	The Merry Widow	Lehár	Opéra Garnier	1997
Manon Lescaut	Manon Lescaut	Puccini	Tampere Opera	1999
Leonore	Fidelio	Beethoven	Metropolitan Opera	2000
Eva	Die Meistersinger	Wagner	Metropolitan Opera	2001
Amelia	Simon Boccanegra	Verdi	Florence	2002
Arabella	Arabella	Richard Strauss	Théâtre du Châtelet	2002
Salome	Salome	Richard Strauss	Paris Opera	2003
Salome	Salome	Richard Strauss	Metropolitan Opera	2004
Manon Lescaut	Manon Lescaut	Puccini	Metropolitan Opera	2008
Salome	Salome	Richard Strauss	Metropolitan Opera	2008
Kát'a	Káťa Kabanová	Janáček	Teatro Real	2008
Tosca	Tosca	Puccini	Metropolitan Opera	2009
Tosca	Tosca	Puccini	Munich Opera Festival	2010
