= Lauri Sirp =

Estonian conductor (born 1969)

Lauri Sirp (born 29 October 1969 in Tallinn) is an Estonian conductor.

In 2002, he graduated from Estonian Academy of Music and Theatre in orchestral conducting speciality.

Since 1993, he has been a conductor at Vanemuine Theatre in Tartu. Since 2009, he has also been the principal conductor for the University of Tartu Symphony Orchestra. Since 2003, he has also conducted for Estonian National Symphony Orchestra.

He has conducted at Estonian Song Festivals.

Awards:

- 2007: Estonian Theatre Annual Award
- 2008: Estonian Cultural Endowment Music Prize
