= Ida Loo-Talvari =

Estonian opera singer (1901–1997)

- Born: Ida Loo; 19 June 1901; Narva, Russian Empire
- Died: 29 June 1997 (aged 96); Stenungsund, Sweden
- Other names: Ida Aav-Loo
- Occupation: opera singer (coloratura soprano)
- Notable work: Juta in Evald Aav's The Vikings
- Spouse(s): Evald Aav (1926–1937); Johannes Alexander Talvari (1938–1979)
- Parent(s): Juhan Loo; Helene Rosalie Katlasepp
- Relatives: Voldemar Loo (brother); Rudolf Loo (brother); Aliide Loo (sister)

Ida Loo-Talvari (née Ida Loo; 19 June 1901, in Narva, Estonian Governorate, Russian Empire – 29 June 1997, in Stenungsund, near Gothenburg, Sweden) was an Estonian opera singer. She was the wife of composer Evald Aav (first marriage) and the sister of the librettist Voldemar Loo.

== Life ==
Ida Loo-Talvari was born is Narva, Estonia. She was the second child of Juhan Loo and Helene Rosalie Katlasepp. Her elder brother was a famous librettist Voldemar Loo. She was studied in Berlin, Milan and Vienna. Her first husband was Evald Aav, an Estonian composer. The couple were married between 1926 and 1937. In 1938 she married Johannes Talvari. In 1944, following the Soviet re-occupation of Estonia, she fled to Sweden. She died in 1997 near Gothenburg, aged 96.
