= Vikerlased =

1928 opera by Evald Aav

Vikerlased (The Vikings) is an Estonian opera in three acts by Evald Aav, his only opera. It is considered to be the first Estonian opera. The libretto is by Voldemar Loo, brother of the composer's first wife, Ida Loo-Talvari. The libretto depicts events related to Pillage of Sigtuna in 1187.

The premiere was on 8 September 1928 at the Estonia Theatre in Tallinn, conducted by Raimund Kull.

The opera lasts approximately 2 hours and 15 minutes.
