= Jaan Rääts =

Estonian composer (1932–2020)

Jaan Rääts (15 October 1932 – 25 December 2020) was an Estonian composer who worked extensively on Estonian film scores of the 1960s and 1970s.

He was born in Tartu and became a member of the Estonian Composers' Union in 1957.

== Compositions ==
=== Piano ===
- Sonata No. 1, Op. 11 No. 1 (1959)
- Sonata No. 2, Op. 11 No. 2 (1959)
- Sonata No. 3, Op. 11 No. 3 (1959)
- Sonata No. 4, Op. 36 "Quasi Beatles" (1969)
- Sonata No. 5, Op. 55
- Sonata No. 6, Op. 57
- Sonata No. 7, Op. 61
- Sonata No. 8, Op. 64
- Sonata No. 9, Op. 76 (1985, rev. 2014)
- Sonata No. 10, Op. 114 (2000, rev. 2014)
- 24 Preludes for piano, Op. 33 (1968)
- 24 Bagatelles for piano, Op. 50
- 24 prelüüdi eesti rahvaviisidele [24 Estonian Preludes] for piano, Op. 60 (1977)
- 24 Marginalia for piano, Op. 65 (1982)
- 24 Estonian Preludes for piano, Op. 80
- 24 Estonian Preludes for piano, Op. 83
- 4 for piano, Op. 125
- Prelüüd for piano, Op. 128 (2014)

==== Two pianos ====
- 24 marginalia, for 2 pianos, Op. 68
- Sonata for 2 pianos, Op. 82 (1990)

=== Chamber music ===
- Meditation on a theme by Mozart for solo violin, Op. 94
- Pala kadentsiga (Piece with a Cadenza) for viola and piano (1981)
- Work for recorder in F major, Op. 103

==== With guitar ====
- Allegro for violin and guitar, Op. 93
- Music without title, for flute and guitar, Op. 107
- Trio for guitar, piano and percussion, Op. 121

==== Trios and quartets ====
- Trio No. 2, Op. 17
- Trio No. 4, Op. 56
- Trio No. 6, Op. 81
- Trio No. 7, Op. 125
- Kaleidoskopische, Études for clarinet, cello and piano, Op. 97
- 6 String Quartets (1955-1983)
- 3 Piano Quintets (1957-1970)
- Quintet No. 3, Op. 38 (1970)
- Variations on a theme by Hanns Eisler for recorder, violin, cello, piano and harpsichord, Op. 62 (1978)
- Sextet for piano and winds, Op. 46 (1972)
- Sextet for 2 pianos and string quartet, Op. 84 (1990)
- Sextet for strings, Op. 98 (1997)
- Nonet, Op. 29 (1967)

=== Orchestra ===
- Symphony No. 1, Op. 3 (1957)
- Symphony No. 2, Op. 8 (1958, rev. 1987 as Op. 79)
- Symphony No. 3, Op. 10 (1959)
- Symphony No. 4, Op. 13: Cosmique (1959)
- Symphony No. 5, Op. 28 (1966)
- Symphony No. 6, Op. 31 (1967)
- Symphony No. 7, Op. 47 (1972)
- Symphony No. 8, Op. 74 (1985)
- Ode for the first cosmonaut, symphonic poem Op. 14 (1961)
- Concerto for chamber orchestra No. 1, Op. 16 (1961)
- Concerto for chamber orchestra No. 2, Op. 78 (1987)
- Viis eskiisi reekviemile [5 sketches for a Requiem], Op. 100 (1996–97)
- Intrada for chamber orchestra, Op. 102 (1997) dedicated to the conductor Tõnu Kaljuste.

=== Ballet ===
- Virumaa: Suite for string orchestra and piano, Op. 115 (2000)

=== Concertos ===
- Concerto for violin No. 1 and chamber orchestra with piano, Op. 21 (1963)
- Concerto for violin No. 2 and chamber orchestra with harpsichord, Op. 63 (1979)
- Concerto for violin No. 3 and chamber orchestra, Op. 96 (1995) dedicated to the German violinist Florian Meierott; Violin and organ version, Op. 96b
- Concerto for piano No. 1, Op. 34 (1968)
- Concerto for piano No. 2, Op. 70 (1983)
- Concerto for piano No. 3, Op. 83 (1990)
- Concerto for 2 pianos and orchestra, Op. 77 (1986)
- Concertino for piano and chamber orchestra, Op. 9 (1958)
- Concerto for piano and chamber orchestra, Op. 41 (1971)
- Concerto for cello No. 1, Op. 27 (1966)
- Concerto for cello No. 2, Op. 43 (1971)
- Concerto for cello No. 3, Op. 99 (1997)
- Concerto for guitar, string orchestra and prepared piano, Op. 88 (1992)
- Concerto for flute, guitar and orchestra, Op. 117 (2000)
- Concerto for 5, 3 trumpets, guitar, percussion and string orchestra with piano, Op. 120 (2002)
- Concerto for trumpet, piano and string orchestra, Op. 92 (1993)
- Concerto for violin and guitar (1998)
- Concerto for 2 guitars (1999)

=== Vocal music ===
- Spring, oratorio on a Maïakovski text for children's choir and orchestra, Op. 15 (1961)
- Karl Marx, for speaking voice, choir and orchestra, Op. 18 (1962–64)
- School Cantata, for children's choir and orchestra, Op. 32 (1968)

== Filmography ==
- Dangerous Games (1974)
- A Time to Live and a Time to Love (1976)
- Väike reekviem suupillile (1972)
- Tuulevaikus (1971)
- Gladiaator (1969)
- Viini postmark (1967)
- Tütarlaps mustas (1966)
- Null kolm (1965)
- Supernoova (1965)
- Roosa kübar (1963)
