= Liina Reiman =

Estonian actress

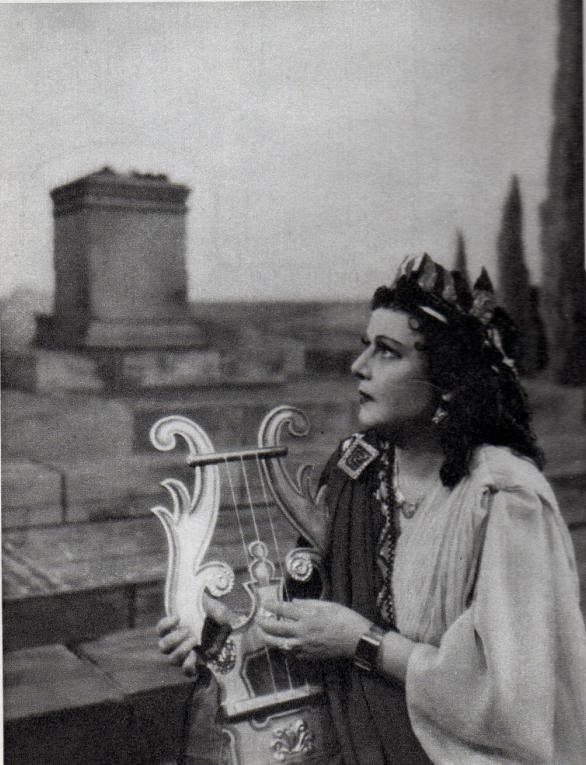
Liina Reiman (1945)

Liina Reiman (née Liina Põlde; 14 November 1891, in Valga – 11 September 1961, in Helsinki) was an Estonian actress.

She started her stage career in 1910 at Vanemuine Theatre.

1912–1915 she worked at Endla Theatre in Pärnu. Later she worked at Estonia Theatre, Tallinn Drama Theatre, Vanemuine Theatre.

1933–1938 she performed also a lot in Finland.

From 1944 she lived and worked in Finland.

Reiman was married to Estonian composer and conductor Raimund Kull. She died on 11 September 1961 Helsinki. In 1980 she was reburied in Tallinn's Forest Cemetery.
