= Pidulik marss =

Estonian military march

The Pidulik marss (Presidential March, also translated to Solemn March) is the official honorary march of the President of Estonia which is played as a welcoming/inspection march for the president, who is also the Commander-in-Chief of the Estonian Defence Forces. The march was composed by Estonian musician Eero Liives (1892–1978). Today the march is played by the Kaitseväe Orkester during military reviews of troops such as the Estonian Honour Guard during state visits and the Eesti Kaitsevägi during military parades in Tallinn.

On 27 January 1923, it was adopted as the military march by of the Estonian Head of State. Prior to that, Björneborgarnas marsch (known in Estonian as Porilaste marss) was used as a presidential song. The government chose to abandon the natively Swedish march, to differentiate itself from Finland, which also uses it as an honorary march. The march is still used as official honorary music for high-ranking officials. The march would be performed for the last time in 4 decades on Independence Day in 1940, due to the German and later Soviet occupation of Estonia taking place in the following four years. Both governments tried to cultivate a separate identity and culture from the Estonian people, which included banning traditional ceremonial pieces such as Pidulik marss. The march was reinstated in 1991, after Estonia's declaration of independence became legal, and has been used by the state ever since.
