= Tiiu Levald =

Estonian opera singer (born 1940)

Tiiu Levald (born 15 March 1940 in Tallinn) is an Estonian opera singer (soprano), pedagogue and music critic.

She graduated in 1970 from the Tallinn State Conservatory (now Estonian Academy of Music and Theatre). From 1964 to 1973, she sang with the Estonia Theatre's opera choir. She has also been a chamber singer.

Levald was a pedagogue from 1973 to 2013 at the Estonian Academy of Music and Theatre. Her students included Sirje Puura, Annika Tõnuri, Vivian Kallaste, Moonika Sutt, Karmen Puis, Eha Pärg, Vilve Hepner, and Merle Hillep.

== Opera roles ==
- 2nd boy (Mozart's The Magic Flute, 1964)
- Tuul (Ülo Raudmäe's Kiri nõudmiseni, 1965)
- Countess Ceprano (Verdi's Rigoletto, 1968)

== Discography ==
1986: Consortium Vinyl 7" Мелодия / С12 23409 006
