= Arete Kerge =

Estonian opera singer

Arete Kerge (née Teemets; born 1985 in Tallinn) is an Estonian opera singer (soprano).

She studied singing at Estonian Academy of Music and Theatre. Subsequently, she graduated from Conservatorio di Musica Santa Cecilia (master's degree).

Awards:

- 2010: First Prize (Chori Praefecti) at the Santa Chiara Classical Singing Competition in the category "Sacred Music" in Naples.
- 2010: Kuldar and Marje Sink Young Singer Award.
- 2011: Third place at International Opera Singers’ competition in Spoleto.
- 2011: Premio Via Vittoria award as the best singer at the Santa Cecilia Conservatory.
- 2014: First Prize at Concours Flame in Paris in the category of classical singing.
- 2015: Richard Wagner Union scholarship.

== Opera roles ==
- Governess (Britten's "The Turn of the Screw")
- Angelica and Genovieffa (Puccini's "Suor Angelica")
- Fanny (Rossini's "La Cambiale di Matrimonio")
