= Eero Liives =

Estonian composer and violinist

- Born: 15 February 1892; Avispea, Vao, Väike-Maarja Parish, Virumaa, Russian Empire
- Died: 25 April 1978 (aged 86); Tallinn, then part of Estonian SSR, Soviet Union
- Children: Ardi Liives

Eero Liives (born 15 February 1892 Avispea, Vao borough, Väike-Maarja Parish, Virumaa – 25 April 1978 Tallinn) was an Estonian composer and violinist.

Liives was the son of writer Ardi Liives. From 1918 until 1965, he played violin in Theatre Estonia Symphony Orchestra.

From 1945 until 1948, he was a member of Estonian Composers' Union. His son was writer Ardi Liives.

== Selected works ==
In total, he has written about 20 orchestral works.

- 1922 "Pidulik marss" ('Ceremonial march' or 'Presidential march')
- "Dance of Fishermen"
- "A Village Dance"
- "Eagle march"
- ''Estonian Rhapsody''
- ''Vambola''
- ''Popular Dance''
- ''Rustic Dance''
- ''Salute to Fatherland''
- ''Sounds of North''
- ''Spring''
- ''Home of North''
- ''Intermezzo''
- ''Festive Ouverture''
- ''By Steps of Victors''
