= Raimund Kull =

Estonian conductor and composer

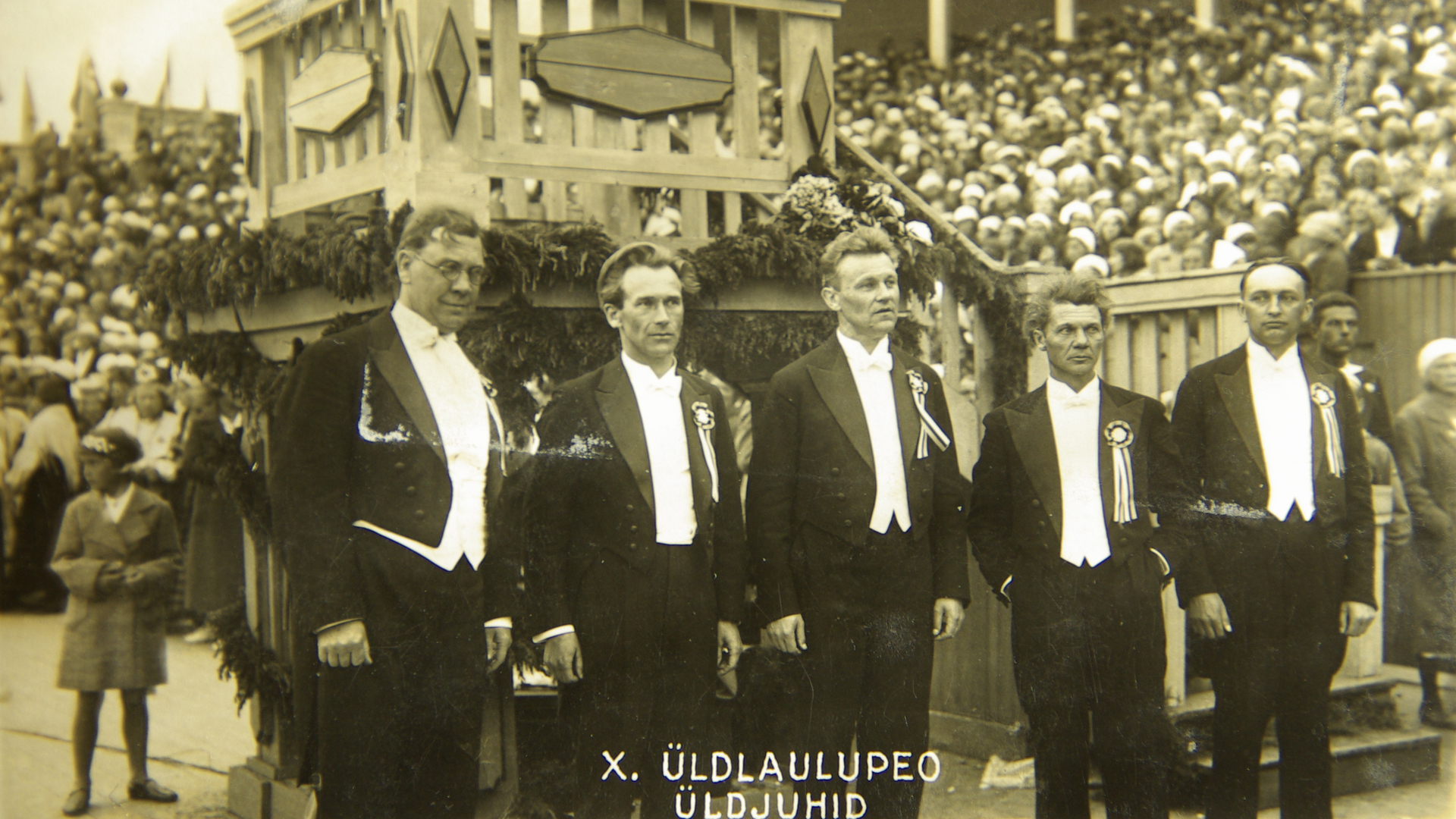
- Kull at foreground left
- Born: 3 October 1882; Narva, Saint Petersburg Governorate, Russian Empire
- Died: 10 October 1942 (aged 60); Tallinn, Ostland, German-occupied Estonia
- Resting place: Metsakalmistu, Tallinn
- Occupations: Composer; conductor; music professor
- Spouse: Liina Reiman

Raimund Kull (3 October 1882 – 10 October 1942) was an Estonian conductor and composer.

== Biography ==
Born in Narva, at the time part of the Russian Empire, Kull studied trombone at the St. Petersburg Conservatory from 1900 until 1906. He then worked as an orchestra conductor in St. Petersburg, Kazan, and Rostov.

From 1912 until 1920, he was the chief conductor of the Estonian National Opera, from 1920 the conductor and from 1930 to 1942 the music director. From 1918 until 1927, he was the conductor of the orchestra of the Estonian Navy, and from 1934 until 1939, conductor of the National Broadcasting Symphony Orchestra.

Kull was one of the founders of Tallinn Conservatory, established in 1919 during the Estonian War of Independence, and taught trombone at the conservatory from 1929. He became a professor at the institute in 1937. Kull was a conductor of the wind orchestra of the IX, X and XI Estonian Song Festivals, held in 1928, 1933, and 1938 respectively.

Raimund Kull was married to actress Liina Reiman.

He died in Tallinn in 1942 and was buried at Tallinn's Forest Cemetery.

== Selected works ==
works for orchestra

- 1920: "The Battle of Kriusha" ('Kriuša lahing')
- "Homeland" ('Kodumaa')
- "Naughty Maiden" ('Vallatu neiu')

== Acknowledgements ==
- Order of the Cross of the Eagle, 3rd class (1932)
- Order of the White Star, 3rd class (1937)
