= Peeter Saan =

Estonian conductor and military personnel

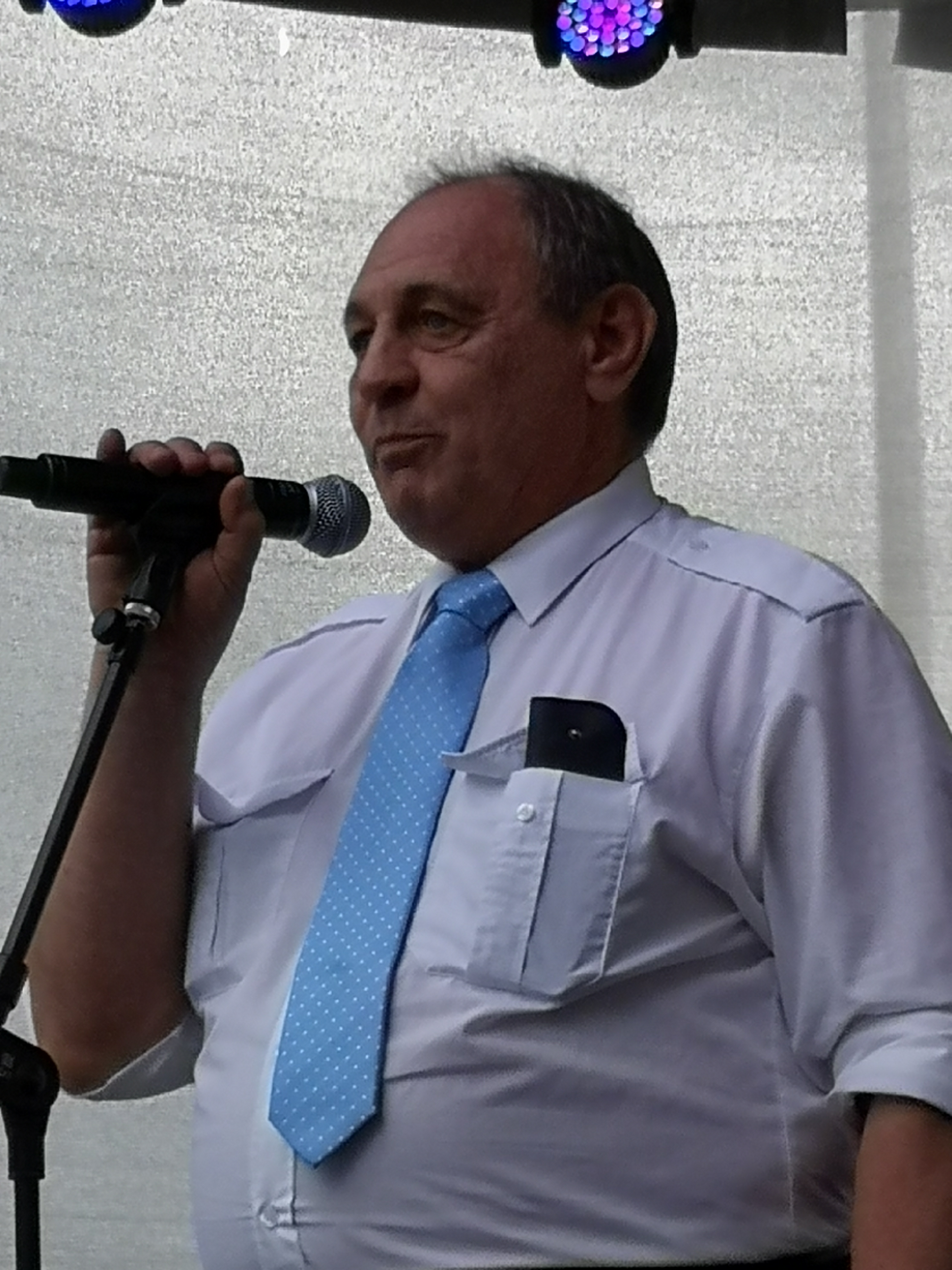
Peeter Saan

Lieutenant-Colonel Peeter Saan (born 16 April 1959) is an Estonian conductor and reserve officer of the Estonian Defence Forces. He is also a clarinet and saxophone player, as well as an arranger.

== Biography ==
Peeter Saan was born in Võru on 16 April 1959. He started studying music at the Võru Children's Music School, majoring in accordion, later clarinet and saxophone. He graduated from the clarinet-saxophone class of the Georg Ots Tallinn Music College in 1983. and in the clarinet class of the Tallinn Conservatoire in 1988. In 2002, he graduated from the Estonian Academy of Music and Theatre with a master's degree in wind orchestra conducting. He has researched Estonian military and ceremonial music, and in 2006 he defended his PhD thesis was entitled as "Estonian state music and military orchestras: formation and development in 1918−1940". He has translated books from Russian to Estonian, including the Adventures of Captain Wrongel by Andrey Nekrasov and The Story of a Red-haired Girl by Lydia Budogoskaya.

He has worked as a musician since the 1980s, playing in the Tallinn Wind Orchestra from 1980–1993 and then in the Estonian Defense Forces Orchestra starting in 1993. From 1995–1996, he served as the band's assistant conductor, deputizing Captain Aivar Raigla. In 1996, he become the chief conductor of Band of the Estonian Defence Forces.

Saan, after celebrating his 60th birthday in 2019, resigned from his post in the band and retired, as 60 is the maximum age in the Defense Forces. His resignation effectively ended his 26-year career in the Estonian military, during which he has solely led the band. His last concert with the band took place on 4 April, where the Commander of the Defense Forces Martin Herem handed him a symbolic sword for his services.

== Awards ==
- Order of the Cross of the Eagle (1999)
- Võru City Coat of Arms (2013)
- Order of the City of Võru (2018)
