= Björneborgarnas marsch =

Finnish musical work

Björneborgarnas marsch Porilaisten marssi Porilaste marss
English: March of the Björneborgers or March of the Pori Regiment
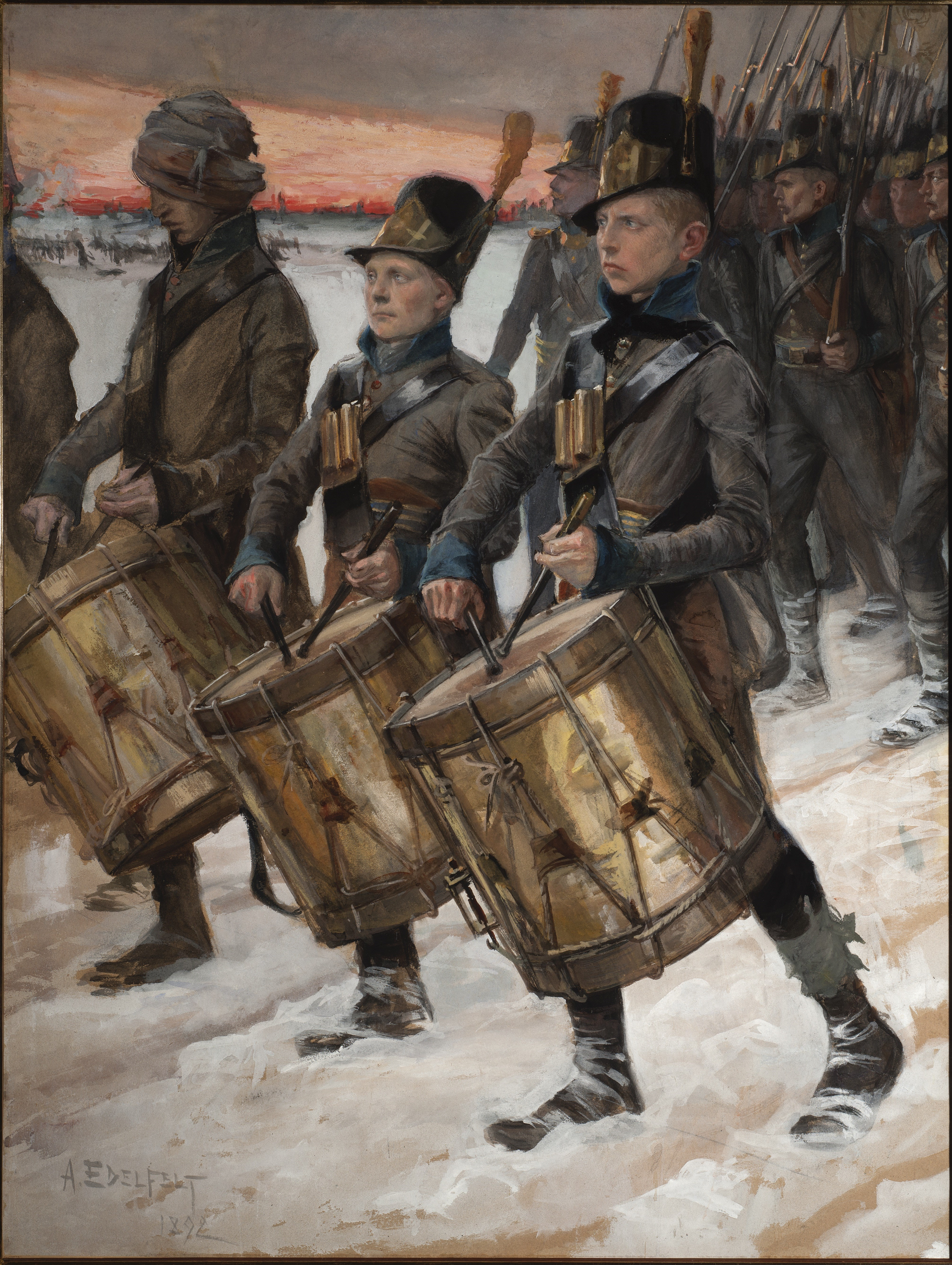
- Swedish Army soldiers of the Royal Björneborg Regiment during the Finnish War (1808–1809). Painting by Albert Edelfelt, 1892.
- Military anthem of Finnish Defence Force Song of the President of Finland Military anthem of the Estonian Defence Forces Song of the Commander of the Estonian Defence Forces Song of the Commander-in-Chief of the Estonian Defence Forces
- Lyrics: Johan Ludvig Runeberg (Swedish), 1860; Paavo Cajander (Finnish), 1889
- Music: Unknown, 18th century
- Adopted: 1918

Audio sample
- file; help

Björneborgarnas marsch (Finnish: Porilaisten marssi; Estonian: Porilaste marss; 'March of the Björneborgers' or 'March of the Pori Regiment') is a Finnish military march originating from the 18th century. Today, it is mainly performed in Finland and Estonia and has served as the honorary march of the Finnish Defence Forces since 1918 and is the Estonian Defence Forces' official honorary march.

== History ==
The original melody of Björneborgarnas marsch is most likely French in origin, and was composed by an unknown composer in the 18th century, although the modern brass band arrangement is by the Finnish German composer Konrad Greve.

Later in the same century, it was made popular in Sweden by the poet Carl Michael Bellman, who used it as a basis for his epistle 51 "Movitz blåste en konsert" (Movitz blew a concert), and was subsequently adopted as a military march by the Royal Swedish army. Following Sweden's defeat to Russia in the Finnish War of 1808–1809, her eastern lands formed the Russian-controlled Grand Duchy of Finland.

The march remained popular throughout the 19th century in both Sweden and Finland. The original text was published in Swedish in 1860 by the Finnish national poet Johan Ludvig Runeberg in his epic poem The Tales of Ensign Stål, although Zachris Topelius had also given it his own words in 1858. The most commonly used Finnish translation was written by Paavo Cajander in 1889, along with Cajander's translation of The Tales of Ensign Stål. The name of the march refers to the Björneborg regiment (Pori in Finnish) of the Swedish army. It contains an iambic meter.

== Use ==
Björneborgarnas marsch today serves as the honorary march of the Finnish Defence Forces and is played (only rarely sung) for the Commander-in-Chief, i.e. the President of Finland. The President has, however, the right to delegate this position to another Finnish citizen; the only time this has occurred was during the World War II, when Marshal Carl Gustaf Emil Mannerheim acted as Commander-in-Chief instead of then-President Risto Ryti. Thus, Ryti is the only President of Finland not to have been Commander-in-Chief at any point of his two terms (1940–1944).

As Finland and Estonia share similarities in their languages, culture and also through their respective military traditions, it is also the Estonian Defence Forces' official honorary march, played for the Commander of the Estonian Defence Forces, its Commander-in-Chief appointed, under constitutional provisions, to the office by the Ministry of Defence and the Cabinet on the proposal of the President of the Republic of Estonia. The tune was first publicly played in Estonia at the 7th Estonian Song Festival in 1910. It was also the march of the State Elder (later as presidential march) in Estonia till 27 January 1923 when the then-Minister of War Jaan Soots replaced it with the Pidulik marss which had won the contest for Estonian-composed state honorary march in 1922.

=== Non-political ===
Since 1948, the Finnish national broadcast company Yleisradio has played Björneborgarnas marsch played on radio or television every time a Finnish athlete wins a gold medal in the Olympic games – the traditional phrase to initiate this was "Pasila, Porilaisten marssi" (radio) and "Helsinki, Porilaisten marssi" (television). An exception to this was made in 1998 when MTV3 similarly asked the song to be played after Mika Häkkinen won the 1998 Formula One World Championship.

Björneborgarnas marsch is also played on Christmas Eve during the Declaration of Christmas Peace ceremony, which has caused minor controversy due to the violent lyrics of the march, even though the lyrics are not sung on the occasion.

In the video game My Summer Car, the march is played on the intro, where the protagonist is born in the back seat of their parents' (and later, said protagonist's) car, as they rush to a hospital. A remixed version can be heard in the credits scene.

== Lyrics ==
=== Original Swedish lyrics ===
Johan Ludvig Runeberg, 1860

Söner av ett folk, som blött
På Narvas hed, på Polens sand, på Leipzigs slätter, Lützens kullar,
Än har Finlands kraft ej dött,
Än kan med oväns blod ett fält här färgas rött!
Bort, bort, vila, rast och fred!
En storm är lös, det ljungar eld och fältkanonens åska rullar;
Framåt, framåt led vid led!
På tappre män se tappre fäders andar ned.

//

Ädlaste mål
Oss lyser på vår bana;
Skarpt är vårt stål
Och blöda är vår vana.
Alla, alla käckt framåt!
Här är vår sekelgamla frihets sköna stråt.

//

Lys högt, du segersälla fana,
Sliten av strider sen en grånad forntids dar,
Fram, fram, vårt ädla, härjade standar!
Än finns en flik med Finlands gamla färger kvar.

//

=== Lyrics in Finnish ===
Translation by Paavo Cajander, 1889.

Pojat, kansan urhokkaan,
mi Puolan, Lützenin ja Narvan
tanterilla verta vuoti,
viel' on Suomi voimissaan,
voi vihollisen hurmehella peittää maan!
Pois, pois, toimet rauhaisat!
Jo tulta tuiskii, myrsky käy,
jo viuhkaa kanuunasta luoti.
Eespäin, miehet uljahat!
Meit' urhoollisten isäin henget seuraavat.

Kas kunnian jo tähti meille hohtaa!
Tuttavahan on verityö, mi kohtaa.
Eespäin kaikki rientäkää!
Vapautemme ikivanha tie on tää.

Voittoisa lippu meitä johtaa,
muinahisaikain taisteluista ryysyinen.
Eespäin, sä jalo vaate verinen!
Viel' liehuu jäännös Suomen värein entisten.

=== Lyrics in Estonian ===
Üles, vaimud vahvamad
kes Pärnu piirilt Peipsini
kes terves Eestis elamas
sest veel on Eestis vaimustust
mis kaitsma valmis kodupinna vabadust
Ja kuni särab meile tähte hele läik
meeles kõigil Riia võidukäik
Sest vahvad vaimud ärgake
Taas Eesti lippu lehvitage võidule
Välgu nüüd mõõk!
Värise vaenlane!
Paukuge püssid, vastu rõhujatele
surma ei karda eesti maleva!

Ei iial Eestit orjastada lase ta!
Pojad rahva vahvama
kes Pihkva, Jamburi ja Võnnu
väljadele külvand surma
Veel võib Eesti võidelda

veel vaenulise verega võib värvi maa
Kuulsuse täht toob hiilgust meie teile
Kõik koos tulle tormake
Me vabaduse kindlustuse tee on see
Välgu nüüd mõõk...

=== Lyrics in English ===
Modern translation.

Sons of a people whose blood was shed,
On the field of Narva; Polish sand; at Leipzig; on Lützen's dark hills;
Not yet is Finland defeated;
With the blood of foes a field may still be tinted red!
Rest, begone, away with peace!
A storm unleashed; lightning swarms and cannons thunder on,
Forward! Forward, line by line!
Brave fathers look down on brave sons.

No nobler aim,
Could light our way,
Our steel is sharp,
To bleed is our custom,
Man by man, brave and bold!
Behold our ancient freedom's march!

Shine bright, our victorious banner!
Torn by distant battles of days gone,
Be proud, our noble, tattered Standard!
There is still a piece of Finland's ancient Colours left!

== Arrangements ==
- military band, arranged in 1851 by the German-Finnish composer and bandleader Konrad Greve
- male choir a cappella, arranged in 1858 by the German-Finnish composer Fredrik Pacius to words by Zacharias Topelius, replaced in 1860 with words by Johan Ludvig Runeberg (Recording: Henrik Wikström and Akademiska Sångföreningen for BIS Records, CD–1694)
- mixed choir a cappella, arranged in ???? by the Finnish composer Martin Wegelius to words by ????
- chamber ensemble, arranged in 1892 by the Finnish composer Jean Sibelius (lost)
- orchestra, arranged in 1900 by Sibelius (Recording: Osmo Vänskä and the Lahti Symphony Orchestra for BIS Records, CD–1445)
- piano, arranged c. 1901 by the Finnish composer Selim Palmgren (Recording: Jouni Somero for Grand Piano, GP939)
- orchestra, arranged in 1904 by the Finnish composer Robert Kajanus (Recording: Osmo Vänskä and the Lahti Symphony Orchestra for BIS Records, CD–575)
- piano, arranged in ???? by the Finnish composer Armas Järnefelt (Recording: Janne Oksanen for Alba Records, ABCD 506)

== See also ==
- "Maamme", Finnish national anthem
- "Mu isamaa, mu õnn ja rõõm", Estonian national anthem
- "Naprej, zastava slave", the Slovene military and presidential anthem
