= Liisa Linko-Malmio =

Finnish opera singer (1917–2017)

Professori Liisa Linko-Malmio
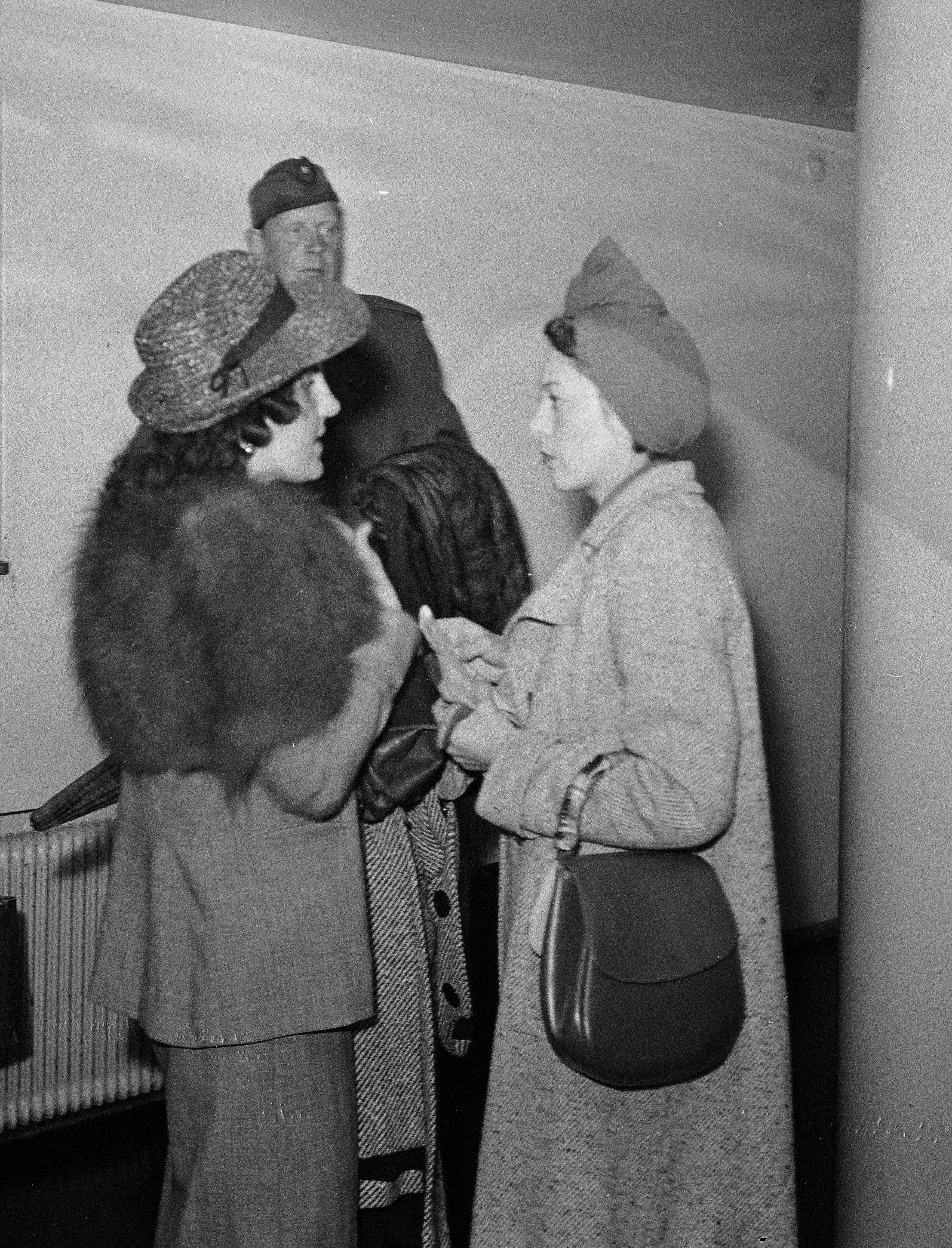
- Liisa Linko (on the right) with Lizzi Waldmüller at Helsinki-Malmi airport, early 1940s
- Born: Liisa Elina Linko; 28 May 1917; Käkisalmi, Grand Duchy of Finland
- Died: 8 December 2017 (aged 100); Helsinki, Finland
- Spouse: Veikko Malmio (m. 1943; died 2000)
- Awards: Pro Finlandia (1957)

Liisa Linko-Malmio (28 May 1917 — 8 December 2017) was a Finnish operatic soprano and a voice pedagog.

== Early life and education ==
Liisa Linko was born into a musical family: her father was the pianist and composer, professor Ernst Linko, her mother singer (mezzo-soprano) Lahja Linko (née Helén), her paternal grandfather choirmaster Ernst Lindroth, and two of her uncles conductor Erkki Linko and choirmaster Fredrik Lundelin.

She went to school initially at the Helsinki Finnish Co-educational School, but did not get on well, to the extent that she was sent to Tampere to complete her secondary education. She graduated in 1937, and was accepted to study at the Sibelius Academy in Helsinki, initially the piano, but switching soon to study singing under her mother. She later continued her studies in Berlin, at the conservatories of Vienna, Salzburg, Moscow and Leningrad, as well as through numerous study trips to Sweden, Germany, the US and the UK.

== Career ==
=== Singing ===
Linko-Malmio was attached to the Finnish National Opera on three occasions between 1940 and 1960, as well as to the opera houses of Bremen (1943) and Copenhagen (1951-1955).

At the National Opera, Linko-Malmio performed over 350 times, in roles including Pamina in Magic Flute, a Flowermaiden in Parsifal, Dorabella in Cosi Fan Tutte, the Countess in Marriage of Figaro, and later, the title roles in Tosca, Aida and Madame Butterfly.

She also made numerous concert and operatic guest appearances around Europe, including Vienna, London, Stockholm, Frankfurt and Moscow.

=== Teaching ===
In 1961, Linko-Malmio was appointed to teach singing at the Sibelius Academy, and in 1963 promoted to tenured lecturer in solo voice. She remained there for forty years, continuing to teach on part-time basis well into her 80s.

She also taught at the Savonlinna Opera Festival's Lied masterclasses in the early 1970s.

Among the best-known of her numerous students were Karita Mattila and Anu Komsi.

== Awards and honours ==
In 1957, Linko-Malmio received the Pro Finlandia medal of the Order of the Lion of Finland,

In 1977, the honorary title of Professori was conferred on Linko-Malmio.

== Personal life ==
In 1943, Liisa Linko married architect Veikko Malmio, and the couple had two sons and one daughter.
