= Oliver Kuusik =

Estonian opera singer

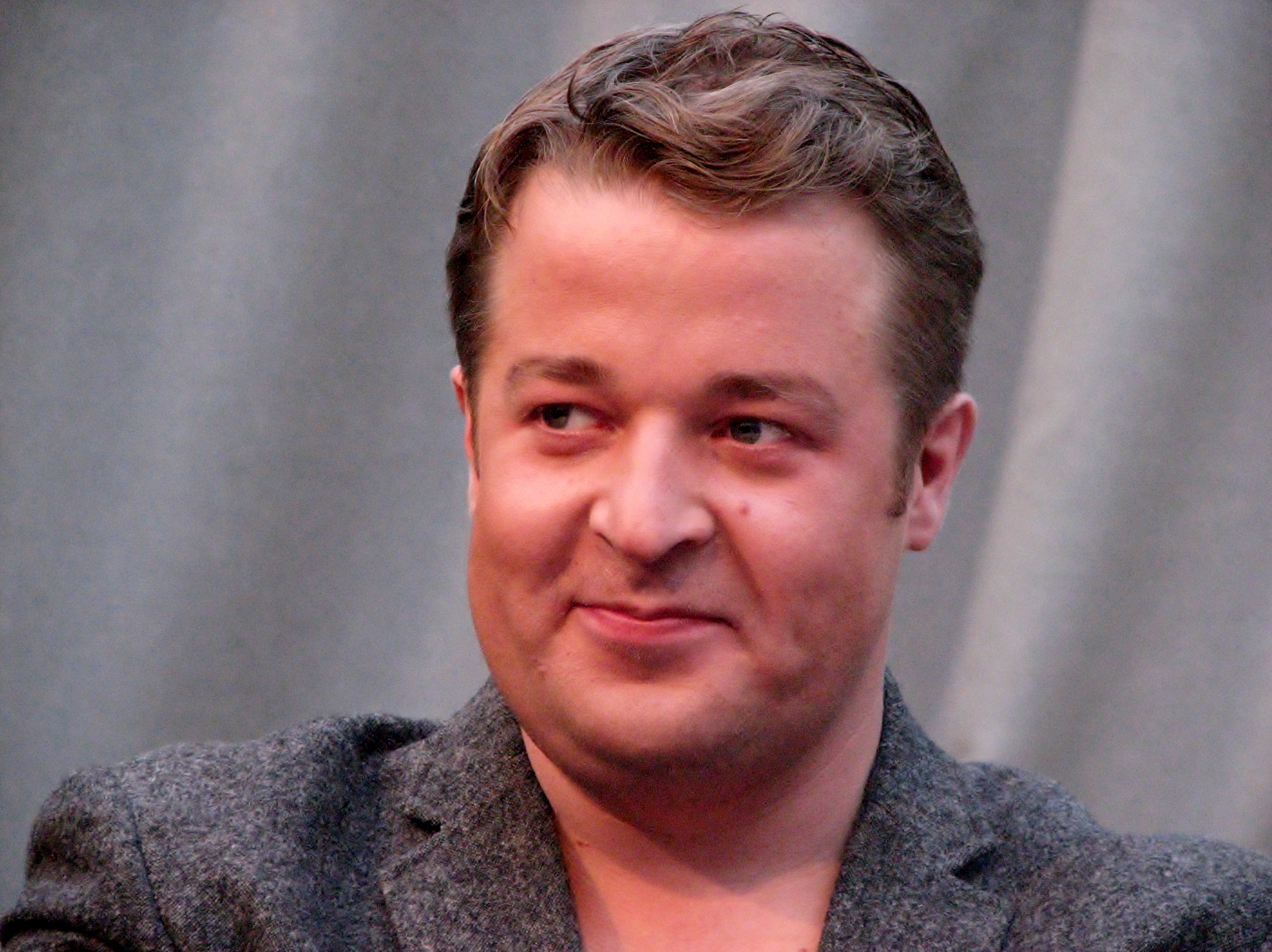
Kuusik in 2013.

Oliver Kuusik (born 21 July 1980 in Tallinn) is an Estonian opera singer (tenor).

Kuusik was born in Tallinn. In 2006, he graduated from Guildhall School of Music and Drama's Opera Studio.

Since 2008, he is a tenor soloist at the Estonian National Opera.

He is a member of Association of Estonian Professional Musicians.

== Roles ==
- Ferrando (Mozart's "Così fan tutte")
- Nicias (Massenet's "Thaïs")
- Bernhard Schmidt (Clements' "Cigars, Biscuits, and Cognac")

He had participated in the ETV music show series "Kaks takti ette".

== Acknowledgments ==
- 2002 - Estonian song contest "Young singer 2002" 1st prize
- 2005 - Pille Lille Musician's Foundation Marje and Kuldar Sing first prize "Young Musician".
- 2006 - Hendrik Krumm singing competition - 1st prize
- 2007 - Klaudia Taevi competition - III prize and special German music prize (jury Barbara Hendricks, Jevgeni Nesterenko etc.)
- 2010 - Crystal Shoe Award
- 2011-15 - SEB audience award laureate
- 2015 - Tiit Kuusik scholarship
