= Ardi Liives =

Estonian writer and playwright

Ardi Liives (until 1939 Liinev; 31 August 1929 in Tallinn – 9 December 1992 in Tallinn) was an Estonian writer and playwright.

Liives was the son of composer and violinist Eero Liives. He graduated from the University of Tartu's Faculty of Law. From 1953 until 1962, he worked in the editorial office of the newspaper Õhtuleht. After 1962 he was a professional writer.

Since 1958 he was a member of Estonian Writers' Union.

== Works ==
- novel "Retro". Tallinn: Eesti Raamat, 1981, 240 pp
- novel "Vastuarmastus". Tallinn: Eesti Raamat, 1982, 190 pp
- novel "Vastuarmastus. 2". Tallinn: Eesti Raamat, 1986, 229 pp
- novel "Passioon". Tallinn: Eesti Raamat, 1986, 253 pp
- novel "Aken vastu päikest". Tallinn: Eesti Raamat, 1988, 239 pp
