= Arvo Volmer =

Estonian conductor

Arvo Volmer (born November 4, 1962, in Tallinn) is an Estonian conductor.

Volmer was principal conductor of the Estonian National Symphony Orchestra from 1993 to 2001. From 2004 to 2013 he was Chief Conductor and Music Director of the Adelaide Symphony Orchestra and in 2014 was appointed Principal Guest Conductor and Artistic Advisor. The Adelaide Review wrote that Volmer's tenure as Chief Conductor saw the orchestra "improve out of all proportion and enter an unprecedented period of ascendancy".

From 2004 to 2012, Volmer combined his Adelaide duties with the posts of music director and principal conductor of the Estonian National Opera in Tallinn. He has also been guest conductor of many orchestras, especially in Scandinavia. Among his recordings are the complete orchestral works of Leevi Madetoja and the complete symphonies of Eduard Tubin and Jean Sibelius. Since September 2014 he has been the Chief Conductor of the Orchestra Haydn di Bolzano e Trento.

== Awards and nominations ==
=== ARIA Music Awards ===
The ARIA Music Awards is an annual awards ceremony held by the Australian Recording Industry Association. They commenced in 1987.

Year	Nominee / work	Award	Result	Ref.
2007	Sculthorpe Requiem and Orchestral Works (with Adelaide Symphony Orchestra)	Best Classical Album	Nominated	
