= Daniel Slater (director) =

British theatre and opera director (born 1966)

Daniel Slater (born 20 April 1966) is a British theatre and opera director.

== Biography ==
Slater was born in London. He did his undergraduate degree at Bristol University and went on to do a PhD at Corpus Christi College, Cambridge.

- The Bartered Bride (Opera North) (1998)
