= Estonian Music Council =

Organization based in Estonia

Estonian Music Council (abbreviation EMC, Estonian: Eesti Muusikanõukogu) is an Estonian non-governmental organization which deals with questions related to Estonian music. For example, to enhance cooperation between Estonian and international music organizations. EMC is also a representative body of Estonian musicians.

EMC was founded in 1992.

Since 2002, EMC is giving out its own music prize. The prize is given out on the International Music Day, which is organized by International Music Council.
