= Evald Aav =

Estonian composer and choirmaster (1900–1939)

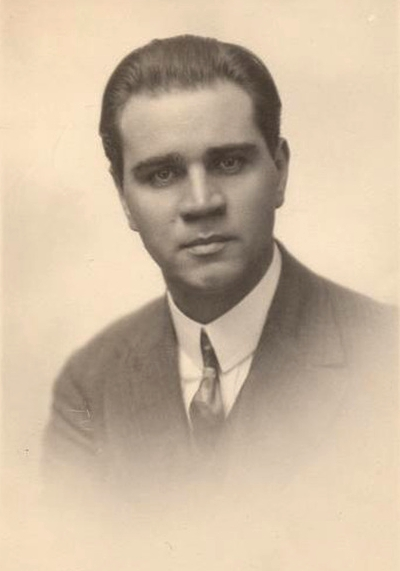
- Evald Aav in 1930
- Born: 7 March [O.S. 22 February] 1900; Tallinn, Governorate of Estonia, Russian Empire
- Died: 21 March 1939
- Occupation: Composer
- Known for: Composer of the first national Estonian opera (Vikerlased)
- Spouse: Ida Loo-Talvari (m. 1926; div. 1937)

Evald Aav (7 March [O.S. 23 February] 1900 – 21 March 1939) was an Estonian composer born in Tallinn, Governorate of Estonia, Russian Empire. He studied music composition there with Artur Kapp and wrote primarily vocal music to words in the Estonian language. In 1928 he composed the first national Estonian opera, Vikerlased (The Vikings). The opera premiered in Tallinn on 8 September 1928. He modelled his style of composition after Tchaikovsky.

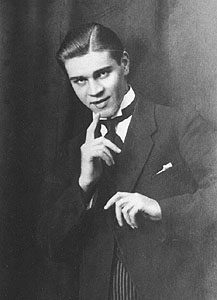
Evald Aav

Aav was married to opera singer Ida Loo-Talvari from 1926 until 1937 when the couple divorced.
