= Estonian National Symphony Orchestra =

Symphony orchestra in Tallinn, Estonia

The Estonian National Symphony Orchestra (Estonian: Eesti Riiklik Sümfooniaorkester [ERSO]) (formerly known as the Symphony Orchestra of the Estonian Radio Committee, Estonian Radio Symphony Orchestra, and the Estonian SSR State Symphony Orchestra) is a symphony orchestra based in Tallinn, Estonia.

== History ==
The orchestra originated from a trio led by Hugo Schütz, who on 18 December 1926 played the first concert broadcast by Tallinn Radio. The ensemble's ranks grew and by 1939 the Radio Broadcasting Symphony Orchestra included 39 performers. In addition to radio concerts, there were live symphony concerts played with guest artists from the Estonia Theatre. In 1939, Olav Roots became the orchestra's music director. The orchestra continued to perform in Tallinn during World War II.

Paul Karp succeeded Roots in 1944; he was followed by Roman Matsov who served as music director until 1963. By 1956 the Orchestra had 90 members. Despite Soviet repertoire policies, Matsov performed sacred works by Johann Sebastian Bach, George Frederic Handel, Wolfgang Amadeus Mozart, and Ludwig van Beethoven. He also conducted the Soviet premieres of works by Igor Stravinsky, Arnold Schoenberg, Anton Webern, and Carl Orff. Tallinn was also typically one of the first cities to hear new symphonies by Dmitri Shostakovich, preceded only by the premieres in Moscow and Leningrad.

Olari Elts is the current music director. Neeme Järvi, the orchestra's longest-serving music director, is Honorary Artistic Director for Life; the Artistic Adviser is Paavo Järvi.

The orchestra has toured across Europe, East Asia, and North America. In 2018, when Estonia celebrated the 100th anniversary of its independence, the ENSO was deeply involved in the anniversary programme both in Estonia and internationally. Estonia's first oratorio, Jonah’s Mission by Rudolf Tobias, was performed at the Konzerthaus Berlin, conducted by Neeme Järvi. Performances were also given at the Sibelius Festival in Lahti and the Baltic Symphony Festival in Riga. Furthermore, the ENSO's musicians gave 100 concerts in one week all over Estonia.

In addition to their live performances, the orchestra has been the recipient of several prizes including a Grammy Award (conductor Paavo Järvi). The orchestra has recorded extensively for labels such as Chandos, BIS, Onyx, Alba Records, Harmonia Mundi, and Melodiya. In 2018, Gramophone awarded Neeme Järvi its Lifetime Achievement Award, which resulted in the ENSO performing at the Gramophone Classical Music Awards Gala. In addition to local radio and television channels, the ENSO's concerts have been broadcast by Mezzo, medici.tv, and the EBU.

The orchestra has premiered symphonic works by almost every major Estonian composer including Arvo Pärt, Erkki-Sven Tüür, Tõnu Kõrvits, and Eduard Tubin.

In 2025, the orchestra collaborated with Brazilian composer Maycon Ananias and American singer-songwriter Jesse Harris for the latter's album If You Believed In Me.

== Principal conductors ==
- Olav Roots (1939–1944)
- Paul Karp (1944–1950)
- Roman Matsov (1950–1963)
- Neeme Järvi (1963–1979)
- Peeter Lilje (1980–1990)
- Leo Krämer (1991–1993)
- Arvo Volmer (1993–2001)
- Nikolai Gennadiyevich Alekseyev (2001–2010)
- Neeme Järvi (2010–2020)
- Olari Elts (2020–present)
