= Neeme Järvi =

Estonian and American conductor (born 1937)

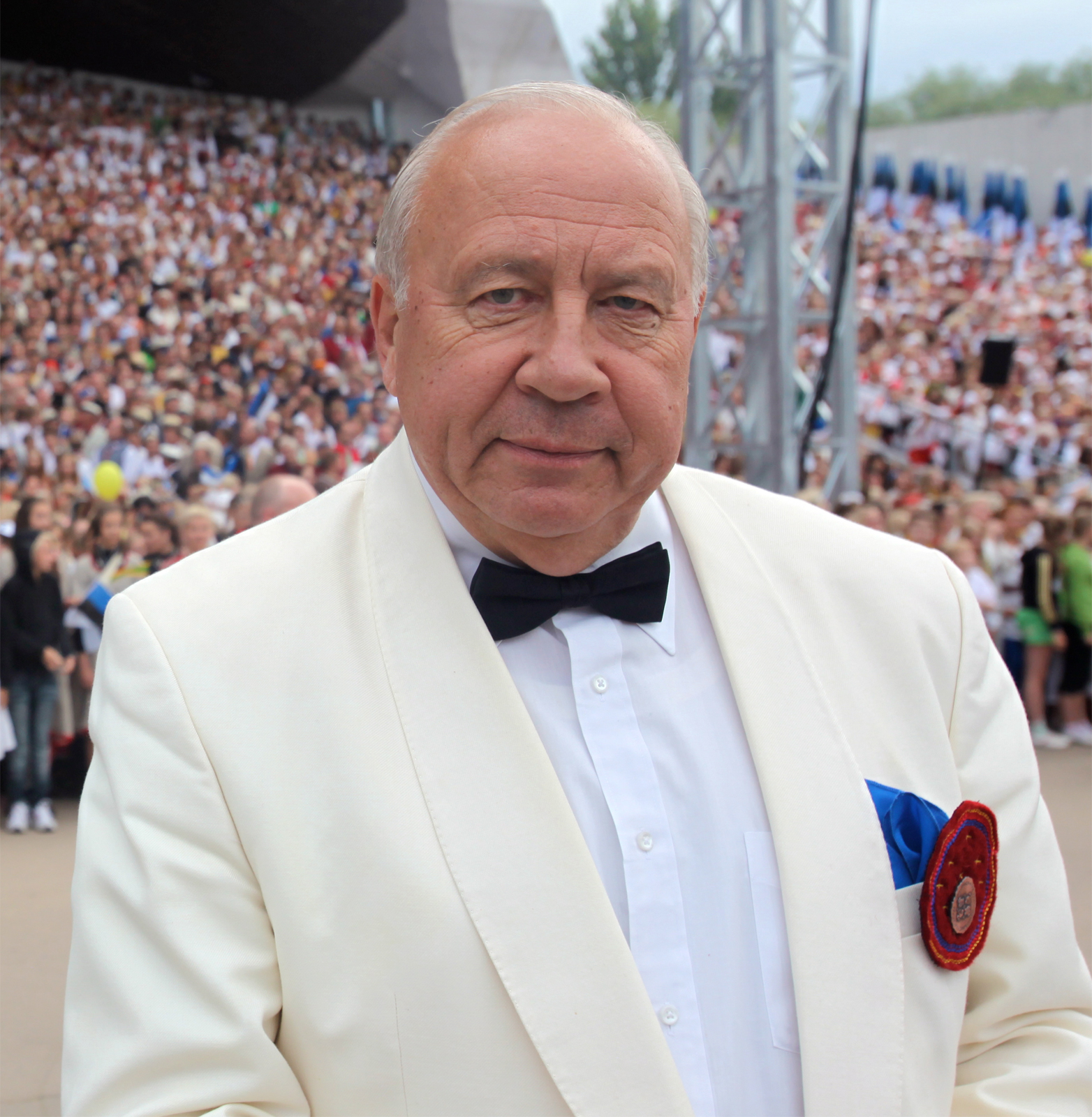
- Järvi at the Estonian Song Festival in 2009
- Born: 7 June 1937 (age 89); Tallinn, Estonia
- Education: Leningrad Conservatory
- Occupation: Conductor
- Organizations: Gothenburg Symphony Orchestra; Royal Scottish National Orchestra; Detroit Symphony Orchestra; New Jersey Symphony Orchestra; Orchestre de la Suisse Romande

Neeme Järvi (Estonian pronunciation: [ˈneːme ˈjærʋi]; born 7 June 1937) is an Estonian and American conductor.

== Early life ==
Järvi was born in Tallinn, Estonia. He initially studied music there, and later in Leningrad at the Leningrad Conservatory under Yevgeny Mravinsky, and Nikolai Rabinovich, among others. Early in his career, he held posts with the Estonian Radio and Television Symphony Orchestra, the Estonian National Symphony Orchestra and the Estonian National Opera in Tallinn. In 1971, he won first prize in the International Conductors Competition at the Accademia Nazionale di Santa Cecilia in Rome. Järvi emigrated to the United States in 1980 with his family. He became an American citizen in 1985.

== Career ==
In 1982, Järvi became the principal conductor of the Gothenburg Symphony Orchestra, and held the post for 22 years, the longest-serving principal conductor in the orchestra's history. During his Gothenburg tenure, the recording profile and reputation of the orchestra greatly increased. He also helped to secure corporate sponsorship from Volvo that allowed the orchestra to increase in size from 80 to 110 players. He retained his post in Gothenburg until 2004, and now holds the title of Principal Conductor Emeritus (Chefdirigent Emeritus) with the orchestra.

Concurrently, Järvi was also principal conductor of the Royal Scottish National Orchestra (RSNO) between 1984 and 1988. At the time, he referred to his two orchestras as his "Berlin Philharmonic" (RSNO) and his "Vienna Philharmonic" (Gothenburg). With the RSNO, he made a number of landmark recordings for Chandos, notably Prokofiev and Dvořák cycles as well as Strauss's tone poems, various Shostakovich pieces, including Symphonies Nos. 4, 7 and 10, and the two violin concertos featuring Lydia Mordkovitch. After a guest-conducting appearance in December 2006 after a nine-year absence from the RSNO, the orchestra named him their conductor laureate.

In the United States, Järvi became music director of the Detroit Symphony Orchestra in 1990. He served until 2005 and is now its music director emeritus. In November 1996, Järvi conducted a joint concert by the Philadelphia Orchestra and the New York Philharmonic in Camden, New Jersey, to raise funds for the Philadelphia Orchestra, which was in the midst of a strike. He donated his services and received no fee for this concert. He received praise from US orchestra musicians for this gesture and expressed a lack of concern about the possibility that orchestral managers would be angry at him for doing so.

Järvi became music director of the New Jersey Symphony Orchestra (NJSO) in 2005, with an initial three-year contract. With the 2007 decision by the NJSO to sell its "Golden Age" collection of string instruments, there was press speculation as to whether Järvi would renew his contract with the NJSO, as he stated that their acquisition of this collection was an important factor in his decision to accept the music directorship. When asked about the possibility of leaving after 2008, he stated: "It's very possible, but I haven't thought about it yet." In October 2007, the NJSO announced that Järvi had extended his contract as music director through the 2008–2009 season. In February 2008, the orchestra announced the conclusion of Järvi's tenure as the NJSO's music director at the end of the 2008–2009 season. In March 2009, the NJSO announced that Järvi had agreed to serve as the orchestra's artistic adviser, and named him their conductor laureate, after the scheduled conclusion of his contract as music director.

In September 2005, Järvi became chief conductor of the Residentie Orchestra of The Hague, with an initial contract of four years. In February 2008, the Residentie Orchestra announced the extension of Järvi's contract as chief conductor through 2011. In November 2009, the Residentie Orchestra further extended his contract through the 2012–2013 season. In August 2009, the Estonian National Symphony Orchestra announced the appointment of Järvi as its next music director, for an initial contract of three years. In November 2010, Järvi resigned over the dismissal of the orchestra's director. In September 2010, the Orchestre de la Suisse Romande named Järvi as its ninth artistic and musical director, as of 2012, with an initial contract of three years.

== Body of work ==
Järvi's discography includes almost 500 recordings for labels such as BIS, Chandos and Deutsche Grammophon. He is best known for his interpretations of Romantic and 20th century classical music, and he has championed the work of his fellow Estonians Eduard Tubin and Arvo Pärt (whose Credo he premiered in 1968). His interpretations of Jean Sibelius with the Gothenburg Symphony are also well known and his complete set of the Glazunov symphonies under Orfeo remains highly regarded (not to mention his recordings of Glazunov's orchestral works such as Scenes de Ballet, From the Middle Ages, The Sea, and the Raymonda Suite). He has also recorded several works that have rarely been recorded in their complete form – among them all of Edvard Grieg's orchestral music, including the complete incidental music for Peer Gynt, as well as Tchaikovsky's complete incidental music for Alexander Ostrovsky's play Snegurochka (The Snow Maiden), and all three of Rimsky-Korsakov's symphonies and orchestral suites.

On SACD, he has recorded Tchaikovsky's complete symphonies (with the Gothenburg SO – BIS label) and ballets (with the Bergen PO – Chandos label). He has also made SACD recordings of music by Mahler, Bruckner, Wagner, Raff and Atterberg for Chandos with his old orchestra, the Royal Scottish NO.

Järvi has given an annual master class, the Neeme Järvi Summer Academy, held until 2008 in Pärnu, Estonia during the David Oistrakh festival. Since 2009, the masterclass has been held during the Leigo Music days in South Estonia. In addition, he has helped raise funds for the Estonian Academy of Music, which opened in September 2000.

For his extensive, high-quality discography, Järvi received the Lifetime Achievement Award during the 2018 Gramophone Awards.

== Personal life ==
Järvi and his wife Liilia have three children, the conductors Paavo Järvi and Kristjan Järvi and the flautist Maarika Järvi. After emigrating to the United States, the Järvi family settled initially in Shrewsbury, New Jersey. He and his wife now reside in New York City.

Cultural offices
Preceded by Zdeněk Mácal	Music Director, New Jersey Symphony Orchestra; 2005–2009	Succeeded by Jacques Lacombe
Preceded by Jaap van Zweden	Chief Conductor, Het Residentie Orkest; 2005–2012	Succeeded by Nicholas Collon
