= Estonian National Opera =

National opera company of Estonia

The Estonian National Opera

Estonian National Opera (Rahvusooper Estonia) is the national opera company of Estonia. The company is based at the Estonia Theatre in Tallinn. The theatre has had several names throughout its existence. The latest one being "The Estonian National Opera", which was adopted in 1998. The company produces a lively and varied season which includes operas, ballets and operettas/musicals with over 500 people currently working at the Estonian National Opera.

== History ==
The song and drama society "Estonia" was founded in 1870. This was the beginning of what has become the current-day Estonian National Opera (Estonian: Rahvusooper Estonia).

Play-acting was taken up in 1871, although theatre as a tradition did not really come into being until 1895, when the society began to direct song plays, folk plays and comedies, usually with singing and dancing. By the start of the 20th century more serious drama was being staged.

In 1906, the society became the basis for the professional theatre called "Estonia" founded by the directors and actors Paul Pinna and Theodor Altermann. This remained tied to the "Estonia" society and the Estonian Theatre "Estonia" Limited Liability Company, founded in 1908, until 1940, at which time they were disbanded under the Soviet rule in Estonia as part of "the bourgeois remnant" and the theatre was nationalized.

Night view of the Estonia Theatre

- 1907 – first operetta staged, Hervé's Mam'zelle Nitouche
- 1908 – first opera staged, Kreutzer's Das Nachtlager in Granada
- 1911 – the first Estonian operetta staged, Adalbert Wirkhaus's St John's Night
- 1922 – the first full evening ballet performance, Léo Delibes's Coppélia
- 1928 – the first Estonian opera, Evald Aav's Vikerlased (The Estonian Vikings)
- 1944 – the first Estonian ballet, Eduard Tubin's Kratt

The opera company is also known as the Estonia Theatre after the building it occupies in downtown Tallinn. This was built as a national effort under the leadership of the "Estonia" society in 1913 and was opened to the public on 24 August of the same year.

The opera house itself was bombed by Soviet air raids on 9 March 1944. It was reopened after the war in 1947. Estonian painters Richard Sagrits, Elmar Kits and Evald Okas painted the ceiling in tempera in the style of Socialist Realism.

Plays were staged in "Estonia" until 1949 when the drama troupe was disbanded, after which "Estonia" continued purely as a musical theatre. The company celebrated its centenary in 2006. The celebration was carried out in a newly renovated opera house.

Directors

- Aarne Viisimaa (1927–1944)

Chief conductors

- Otto Hermann (1906–1908)
- Adalbert Wirkhaus (1908–1912)
- Raimund Kull (1912–1942)
- Juhan Aavik (1925–1933)
- Verner Nerep (1942–1944)
- Priit Nigula (1942–1951)
- Kirill Raudsepp (1951–1963)
- Neeme Järvi (1963–1975)
- Eri Klas (1975–1994)
- Paul Mägi (1995–2002)
- Jüri Alperten (2002–2004)
- Arvo Volmer (2004–2012)
- Vello Pähn (2012–2019)
- Arvo Volmer (2019–)

== See also ==
- List of concert halls
