= Estonian Academy of Music and Theatre =

University in Tallinn

- Former name: Tallinn Higher Music School
- Type: Public
- Established: 1919; 107 years ago
- Location: Rävala puiestee 16, 10141 Tallinn, Estonia, Tallinn, Estonia; 59°25′52″N 24°44′52″E
- Campus: Urban
- Website: eamt.ee

The Estonian Academy of Music and Theatre (Eesti Muusika- ja Teatriakadeemia) began as a mixed choir of the Estonia Society Musical Department (EMD) on the eve of World War I. The assembly of the Estonia Society created the Tallinn Higher Music School on November 17, 1918. The opening ceremony took place on September 28, 1919. In 1923 the educational institution was renamed the Tallinn Conservatoire. In 1938 the State Drama School was opened. In 1993 the school was renamed the Estonian Academy of Music. In 1995 the Drama Faculty was renamed the Higher Theatre School.

Some prominent graduates of the Estonian Academy of Music include singers Aile Asszonyi, Heli Lääts, and Ain Anger, conductors Roman Matsov, Tõnu Kaljuste, Olari Elts, Eri Klas, and Kristiina Poska, composers Arvo Pärt, Lepo Sumera, Erkki-Sven Tüür and Ardo Ran Varres, director Andres Puustusmaa, and actors Tõnu Aav, Heino Mandri, Elmo Nüganen, Ain Lutsepp, Margus Oopkaup, Jan Uuspõld, Tõnu Tepandi and Taavi Eelmaa.

== History ==
=== Establishment ===
The Tallinn Higher Music School was the predecessor of the current EAMT, with the opening ceremony taking place on September 28, 1919, in the Estonia Concert Hall. From 1919–1923 the Principal of the school was Mihkel Lüdig. In 1923, it was renamed to Tallinn Conservatoire. The academic level of the conservatoire can be considered to have been relatively high, as many of its students participated in international competitions in the 1930s. The most successful of them was Tiit Kuusik, who was awarded the first prize at the International Singing Competition in Vienna in 1938. The conservatoire became nationalized in 1935. In 1938 the State Drama School was opened.

=== WWII and the Soviet era ===
Following the arrival of German occupation powers, the conservatoire struggled to restore its earlier teaching activities. During the March 9, 1944 air raid, the building of the conservatoire, as well as most of its equipment, was almost completely destroyed. In November 1944, following another change of power, the conservatoire was reopened. The conservatoire's creative environment began to see revival in the mid-1950s. In 1957 the Drama Faculty was established at the conservatoire, with Voldemar Panso becoming its first head. In 1989, its former name – the "Tallinn conservatoire" – was restored. Four years later the school was renamed the "Estonian Academy of Music" (Eesti Muusikaakadeemia).

=== Post-independence and present day ===
In 1992 an extensive reform of the study structure was introduced and the school adopted a subject-based study system. Degree studies were introduced enabling students of the four-year program would receive a bachelor's degree. In 1993, a two-year master's degree program was added. In 1996 a four-year doctoral program in musicology was introduced, whereas in 2000 specific curricula were designed for performers and composers. In 2006 a new program for dramatic art was added, which also has a creative emphasis. Since 1999 the Estonian Academy of Music is based in a building located in the center of Tallinn. Since 2002, it offers a Joint MA in Cultural Management in collaboration with the Estonian Academy of Arts and Estonian Business School. The present name of the academy – Estonian Academy of Music and Theatre – was adopted in 2005.

=== Estonian Academy of Music and Theater Symphony Orchestra ===
At the academy, Estonian Academy of Music and Theater Symphony Orchestra is operating. The orchestra was probably established in 1921.

=== Rectors and directors ===
- 1919–1923 Mihkel Lüdig (director)
- 1923–1933 Jaan Tamm
- 1933–1940 Juhan Aavik
- August–November 1940 Riho Päts (acting director)
- 1940–1941 Ksenia Aisenstadt (deputy director)
- 1941–1944 Vladimir Alumäe (director)
- 1941–1944 Juhan Aavik
- 1944–1948 Vladimir Alumäe
- 1948–1951 Bruno Lukk
- 1951–1952 Georg Ots
- 1952–1964 Eugen Kapp
- 1964–1970 Vladimir Alumäe
- 1970–1982 Viktor Gurjev
- 1982–1992 Venno Laul
- 1992-2017 Peep Lassmann
- 2017–... Ivari Ilja

== Alumni ==
- Evald Aav, one of the founders of the Estonian national opera
- Gustav Ernesaks, choral conductor
- Voldemar Kuslap, baritone singer
- Boris Parsadanian, composer and director of Eesti Kontsert
- Arvo Pärt, composer of classical and religious music
- Peeter Saan, Commander of the Band of the Estonian Defence Forces (1996-2019)
