= List of Estonian composers =

The following is a list of Estonian composers of classical music.

== A ==
- Els Aarne (1917–1995)
- Evald Aav (1900–1939)
- Juhan Aavik (1884–1982)
- Edgar Arro (1911–1978)

== B ==
- Ludwig Busbetzky (17th century)

== E ==
- René Eespere (born 1953)
- Olav Ehala (born 1950)
- Heino Eller (1887–1970)
- Gustav Ernesaks (1908–1993)

== G ==
- Sven Grünberg (born 1956)

== H ==
- Miina Härma (1864–1941)

== J ==
- Lauri Jõeleht (born 1974)
- Robert Jürjendal (born 1966)

== K ==
- Hillar Kareva (1931–1992)
- Raimo Kangro (1949–2001)
- Artur Kapp (1878–1952)
- Eugen Kapp (1908–1996)
- Alfred Karindi (1901–1969)
- Kustas Kikerpuu (1937–2008)
- Margo Kõlar (born 1961)
- Kristjan Kõrver (born 1976)
- Tõnu Kõrvits (born 1969)
- Cyrillus Kreek (1889–1962)
- Ülo Krigul (born 1978)
- Raimund Kull (1882–1942)
- Aleksander Kunileid (1845–1875)

== L ==
- Aleksander Läte (1860–1948)
- Artur Lemba (1885–1963)
- Märt-Matis Lill (born 1975)
- Carl Ludvig Lithander (1773–1843)
- Mihkel Lüdig (1880–1958)

== M ==
- Ester Mägi (1922–2021)
- Malle Maltis (born 1977)
- Alo Mattiisen (1961–1996)

== N ==
- Tõnu Naissoo (born 1951)
- Uno Naissoo (1928–1980)
- Leonhard Wilhelm Johann Neuman (1885–1933)
- Leo Normet (1922–1995)

== O ==
- Arne Oit (1928–1975)
- Eduard Oja (1905–1950)
- Valter Ojakäär (1923–2016)

== P ==
- Boris Parsadanian (1925–1997)
- Arvo Pärt (born 1935)
- Alo Põldmäe (born 1945)

== R ==
- Jaan Rääts (1932–2020)
- Kaljo Raid (1921–2005)
- Rein Rannap (born 1953)
- Ülo Raudmäe (1923–1990)
- Villem Reimann (1906–1992)
- Jüri Reinvere (born 1971)
- Richard Ritsing (1903–1994)

== S ==
- Mart Saar (1882–1963)
- Juhan Simm (1885–1959)
- Urmas Sisask (1960–2022)
- Peeter Süda (1883–1920)
- Lepo Sumera (1950–2000)

== T ==
- Eino Tamberg (1930–2010)
- Aleksander Eduard Thomson (1845–1917)
- Rudolf Tobias (1873–1918)
- Helen Tobias-Duesberg (1919–2010)
- Veljo Tormis (1930–2017)
- Eduard Tubin (1905–1982)
- Helena Tulve (born 1972)
- Konstantin Türnpu (1865–1927)
- Erkki-Sven Tüür (born 1959)

== U ==
- Pärt Uusberg (born 1986)

== V ==
- Peeter Vähi (born 1955)
- Raimond Valgre (1913–1949)
- Ardo Ran Varres (born 1974)
- Tuudur Vettik (1898–1982)
- Liis Viira (born 1983)
- Ülo Vinter (1934–2000)
- Toomas Voll (born 1958)
- Enn Võrk (1905–1962)

== W ==
- Adalbert Wirkhaus (1880–1961)

== See also ==
- Music of Estonia
