= Kristi Mühling =

Estonian musician, kannel player

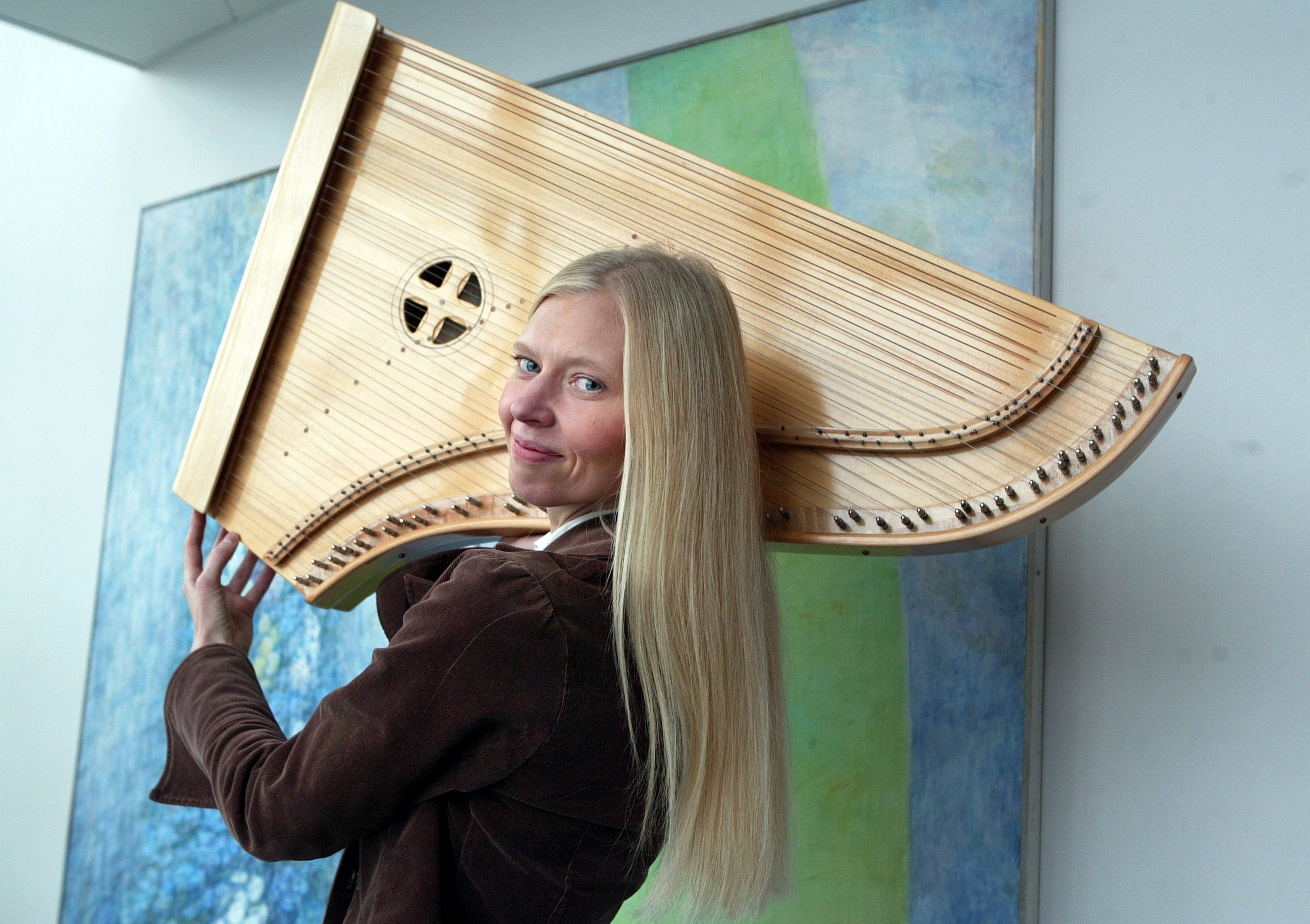
Kristi Mühling

Kristi Mühling (born 28 March 1971) is a professional Estonian chromatic kannel player who specialises mainly on classical and contemporary music. She has premiered numerous compositions for this instrument, both as a soloist and chamber musician. She is a member of regularly performing ensembles such as Resonabilis (founded in 2002) and Una Corda (founded in 2009). Kristi Mühling is also the founder of the chromatic kannel specialty at the Estonian Academy of Music and Theatre and has worked there since the establishment of the specialty in 2002.

== Education and pedagogical activity ==
Kristi Mühling was born in 1971 in Tallinn and began her kannel studies at the age of 10 at the Tallinn School of Music under the tutelage of Els Roode. She continued her studies at the Tallinn Georg Ots Music School. In 1991–2000, she studied at the Sibelius Academy in Helsinki and obtained a master's degree as a kannel soloist (class of Ritva Koistinen). In 2000, she was awarded 1st Prize at the Jonas Švedas Contest for Baltic and Finnish kannel players in Vilnius, Lithuania. Kristi Mühling teaches kannel at the Georg Ots Tallinn Music School (since 1997) and at the Estonian Academy of Music and Theatre (since 2002).

== Engagements as a musician ==
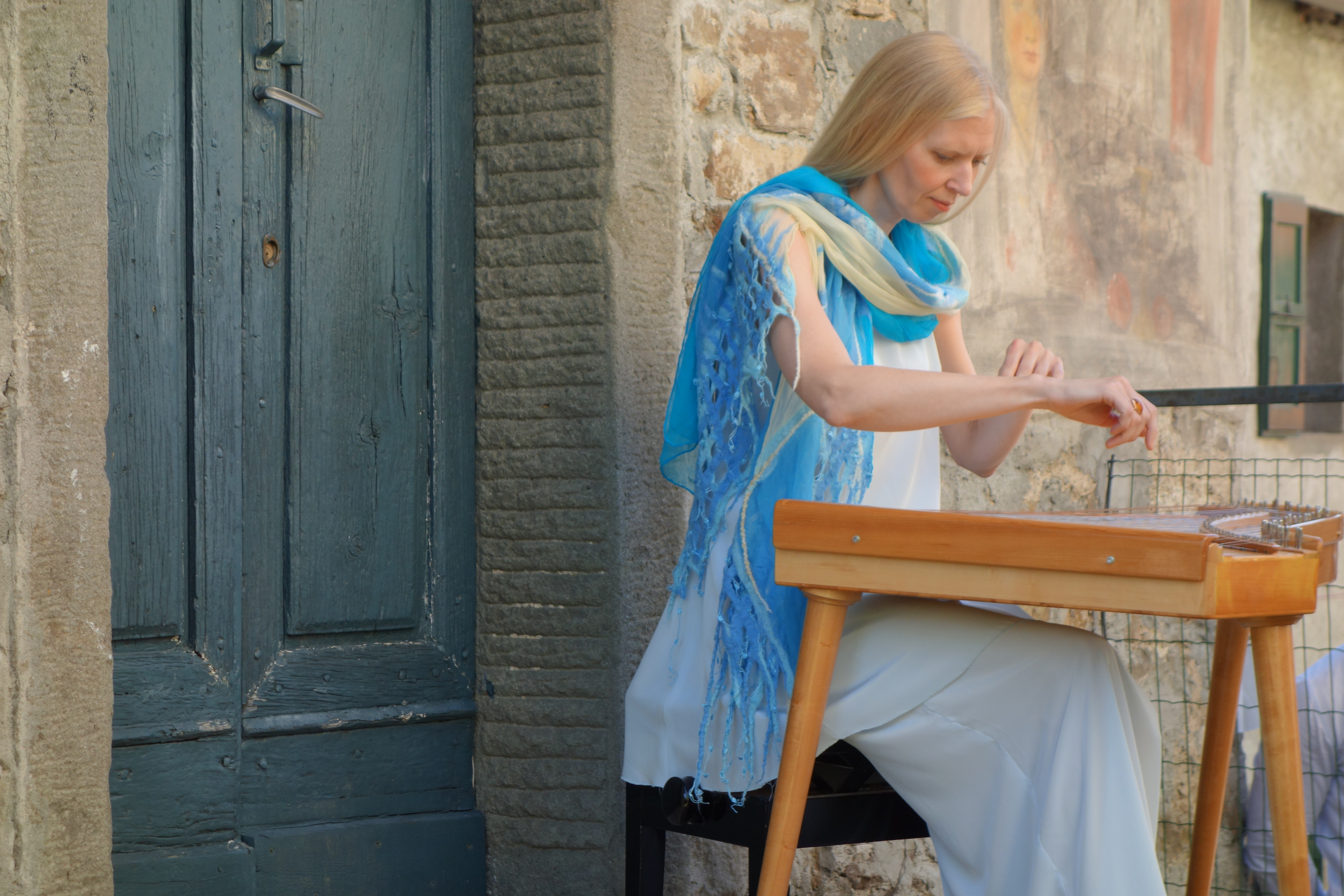
Kristi Mühling playing chromatic kannel

Kristi Mühing's busy schedule includes frequent performances as a soloist and chamber musician in Estonia and abroad. She is devoted to introducing, developing and promoting the Estonian chromatic kannel as an instrument of diverse opportunities, and she regularly cooperates with composers to increase the repertoire for the instrument. She has premiered numerous new compositions written by Mirjam Tally, Lauri Jõeleht, Helena Tulve, Tatjana Kozlova-Johannes, Malle Maltis, Märt-Matis Lill, Kristjan Kõrver, John Buckley (Ireland) and others. In addition to participating in regularly performing ensembles such as Resonabilis (kannel, flute, voice, cello) and Una Corda (kannel, harp, harpsichord), she also contributes to various other music projects. She has soloed with the Tallinn Chamber Orchestra, the Estonian National Symphony Orchestra (ERSO), NYYD Ensemble, and Sacrum Facere – a project launched by the jazz musician and composer Maria Faust.

The contemporary music ensemble Resonabilis (founded in 2002; kannel – Kristi Mühling, flute – Tarmo Johannes, voice – Iris Oja, cello – Aare Tammesalu) mainly focuses on performing original music: the majority of young Estonian composers have composed music for this ensemble. The ensemble performs frequently in Estonia and abroad (The 24th Fadjr International Music Festival in Tehran, Iran, 2008; Vale of Glamorgan in Wales, Great Britain, 2010; Usedomer Musik Festival, Germany, 2013; Contemporary Music Festival in Chișinău, Moldova, 2014). Resonabilis also strives to unite music and other forms of art – the ensemble often cooperates with visual artists and theatre professionals. In 2012, Resonabilis received the Annual Award of the Cultural Endowment of Estonia for the high quality of their performance of contemporary Estonian music. In 2013, Resonabilis premiered Kristjan Kõrver's chamber opera Raud-Ants (Iron Ants) at the Saaremaa Opera Festival in Estonia, which was awarded a special prize by the Estonian Theatre Union.

The repertoire of the chamber ensemble Una Corda (founded in 2009; kannel – Kristi Mühling, harp – Liis Viira; harpsichord – Ene Nael) consists of original music and arrangements, with an emphasis on Estonian music. The ensemble regularly performs in Estonia and abroad (Contemporary Harpsichord Music Festival Procembalo in Parma, Italy, 2013; Festival Nordlichter in Berlin, Germany, 2104; Global Harp Congress in Sydney, Australia, 2014).

== Recordings ==
- 2005 CD Estonian composer Helena Tulve's CD Sula, track No. 4 “...Il Neige...” (for kannel and harpsichord) (Estonian Radio)
- 2009 2–CD Estonian Academy of Music and Theatre 90, CD 2, track No 1; H. Tulve “Silmajad” (for kannel, harpsichord and harp)
- 2009 CD Resonabilis, contemporary chamber and solo music for kannel (Resonabilis)
- 2011 CD Una Corda. Una Corda (Estonian Radio)
- 2012 CD Resonabilis. North Wind, South Wind (ERP)
- 2014 CD Jazz album Maria Faust Sacrum Facere (Barefoot records)
