= Liis Viira =

Estonian composer, harpist, and animator (born 1983)

Liis Jürgens (Viira) (born Jürgens; years 2010-2020 Viira; born 7 April 1983) is an Estonian composer, harpist, and animator. She has also used the pseudonym Liz Wirestring.

== Life and career ==
Liis Jürgens has written quite diverse music for orchestras and choirs as well as chamber music and electroacoustic improvisations. Despite being one of the best-known harp players in Estonia and a member of Estonian State Symphony Orchestra, she often uses harp along with non-classical instruments. She has admitted her compositions for human voice are difficult for singers as she uses voice like just another instrument. Jürgens tends to stress the importance of lyrics, and has often composed her own due to lack of poetry intrinsically harmonic with the music.

Jürgens has also been playing in ensembles Una Corda and Lippajad.

She has composed music for film, like Eleonore de Montesquieu's documentary Paldiski (2005). In 2012, Viira's Liivaterade raamat represented Estonia on International Rostrum of Composers run yearly by International Music Council.

In the end of 2015, Viira and Margo Kõlar gained a lot of media coverage with their Baby Symphony (Reverbeebi) presented on Estonian Music Days. In that project consisting of several small compositions, babies' voices were used along with the instruments and lyrics by Doris Kareva. The premiere was presented by Collegium Musicale chamber choir and accompanied by dancers from Tallinn Ballet School. Later, it was used as a musical installation in Estonian Theatre and Music Museum. Her newer composition, Root Bridge (2016), mixing instruments with voice improvisation and led by Robert Jürjendal on touch guitar, was characterized by music critic Maria Mölder as a "unique breathtaking world of sound achieved by the harmony of different instruments", based on a "less is more" approach.

== Education ==
- 2002 Tallinn Music High School (harp with Eda Peäske, composition with Alo Põldmäe)
- 2002–2009 Estonian Academy of Music (harp with Eda Peäske, composition with Helena Tulve, additionally electronic music with Margo Kõlar and improvisation with Taavi Kerikmäe and Anto Pett)
- 2005/2006 as an exchange student in University of Music and Performing Arts Vienna with professor Adelheid Blovsky-Miller's harp class
- Since 2012, Estonian Academy of Arts (animation)

== Works ==
- Half-Mirrors (1998)
- Port Area (2001)
- RedBlueYellow (2002)
- Labyrinth Harp Play (2002)
- Coastline (2003)
- Lullaby (2004)
- Invisible (2005)
- Streamline (2006/2007)
- digitalis purpurea (2007)
- Honeycomb Music (2008)
- Butterfly Cathers
- Snowy Christmas
- Spider Tectonics
- Chaconne, or 50 Rounds to the Health of Erkki Sven
- Liivaterade raamat (Book of Sand Grains, 2012)
- Baby Symphony (2015, with Margo Kõlar)
- Kaheksa (Eight, 2016)

== Literature ==
- Liis Jürgens Võlurite ring. Ansambel U: kontserdist Muusika 2/2005, p. 18 (A review by Liis Jürgens)
