= Koistinen =

Koistinen is a Finnish surname. Notable people with the surname include:

- Al Koistinen (born 1948), American former politician
- Hannu Koistinen (born 1966), Finnish kantele maker
- Katri Helena Kalaoja (née Koistinen, born 1945), Finnish singer known by her stage name Katri Helena
- Markus Koistinen (born 1970), retired Finnish shot putter
- Matti Koistinen (born 1986), Finnish ice hockey player
- Otto Koistinen (1925–2020), Finnish kantele maker
- Petteri "Kode" Koistinen, Finnish guitarist, member of the Finnish rock band Neljä Ruusua
- Ritva Koistinen (born 1956), Finnish kantele player
- Ville Koistinen (born 1982), Finnish ice hockey player
