= Music of Estonia =

The recorded history of music in Estonia dates as far back as the 12th century.

== History ==
The earliest mentioning of Estonian singing and dancing dates back to Saxo Grammaticus' Gesta Danorum (c. 1179). Saxo speaks of Estonian warriors who sang at night while waiting for an epic battle.

The Estonian folk music tradition is broadly divided into 2 periods. The older folksongs are also referred to as runic songs, traditional songs in the poetic metre regivärss that are shared by all Finnic peoples. Runic singing was widespread among Estonians until the 18th century, when it started to be replaced by rhythmic folksongs. Professional Estonian musicians emerged in the late 19th century at the time of Estonian national awakening. The best known active Estonian composers is Arvo Pärt.

=== Folk music ===
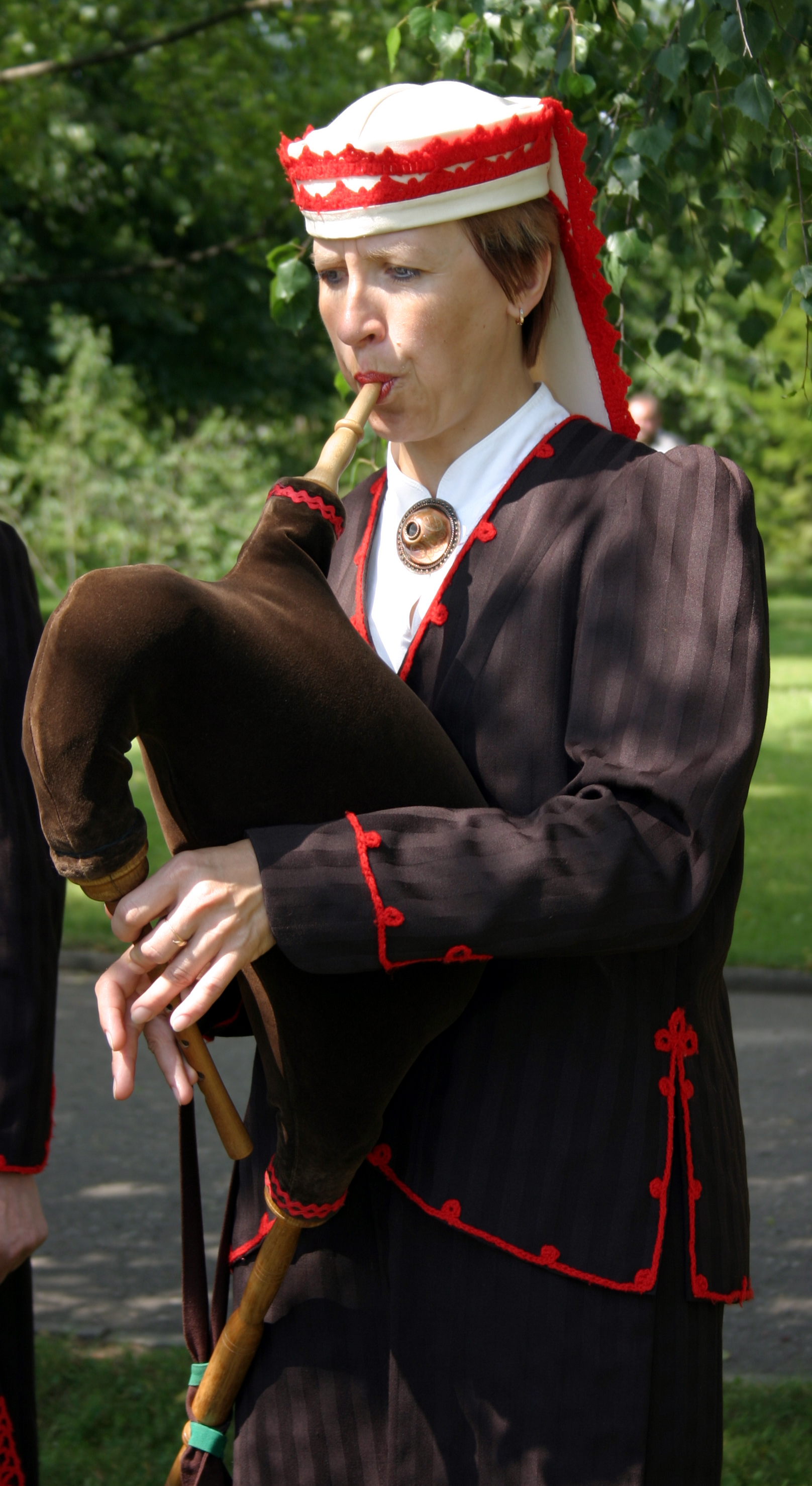
Bagpipes or torupill

Estonian epic poetry (Estonian: regilaul) has been extensively recorded and studied, especially those sung by women. They can come in many forms, including work songs, ballads and sung legends. Much of the early scholarly study of epic poetry was done in the 1860s by Friedrich Reinhold Kreutzwald, who used regilaul themes to compose the Estonian national epic, Kalevipoeg. By the 20th century, though, regilaul singing had largely disappeared from Estonia, with vibrant traditions existing only in Setumaa and Kihnu.

Traditional wind instruments derived from those used by shepherds, such as the karjapasun and vilepill, were once widespread, but are now more rarely played. Other instruments, including the fiddle, zither, concertina and accordion are used to play polka or other dance music. The kannel is a native instrument that is probably even more popular among the Estonian diaspora in North America than in its homeland, where well-known kannel musicians include Igor Tõnurist and Tuule Kann.

A notable example of an Estonian folk song is called "The herring lived on dry land", or simply "The herring song". According to its lyrics, in the ancient times the herring used to have legs and live on dry land. It used to destroy vermin, like rats and it was kept like a cat. One time a two masted sailing ship was transporting a large load of salt. Back then salt was expensive. Some unit of it called saam cost 100 of something in gold. There was a herring aboard the ship. The specific herring liked to eat salt, so it started to tunnel its way around the salt sacks. Eventually it accidentally chewed its way through the ships wooden hull, causing it to sink. This angered Neptune (the god of sea), who said to the herring: "Hey herring, because you chewed a hole into the ship and sunk the new ship, you will now have to live in seawater as punishment." The salt from the ship was released into the sea, resulting in the seas now having a salt composition.

=== National awakening ===
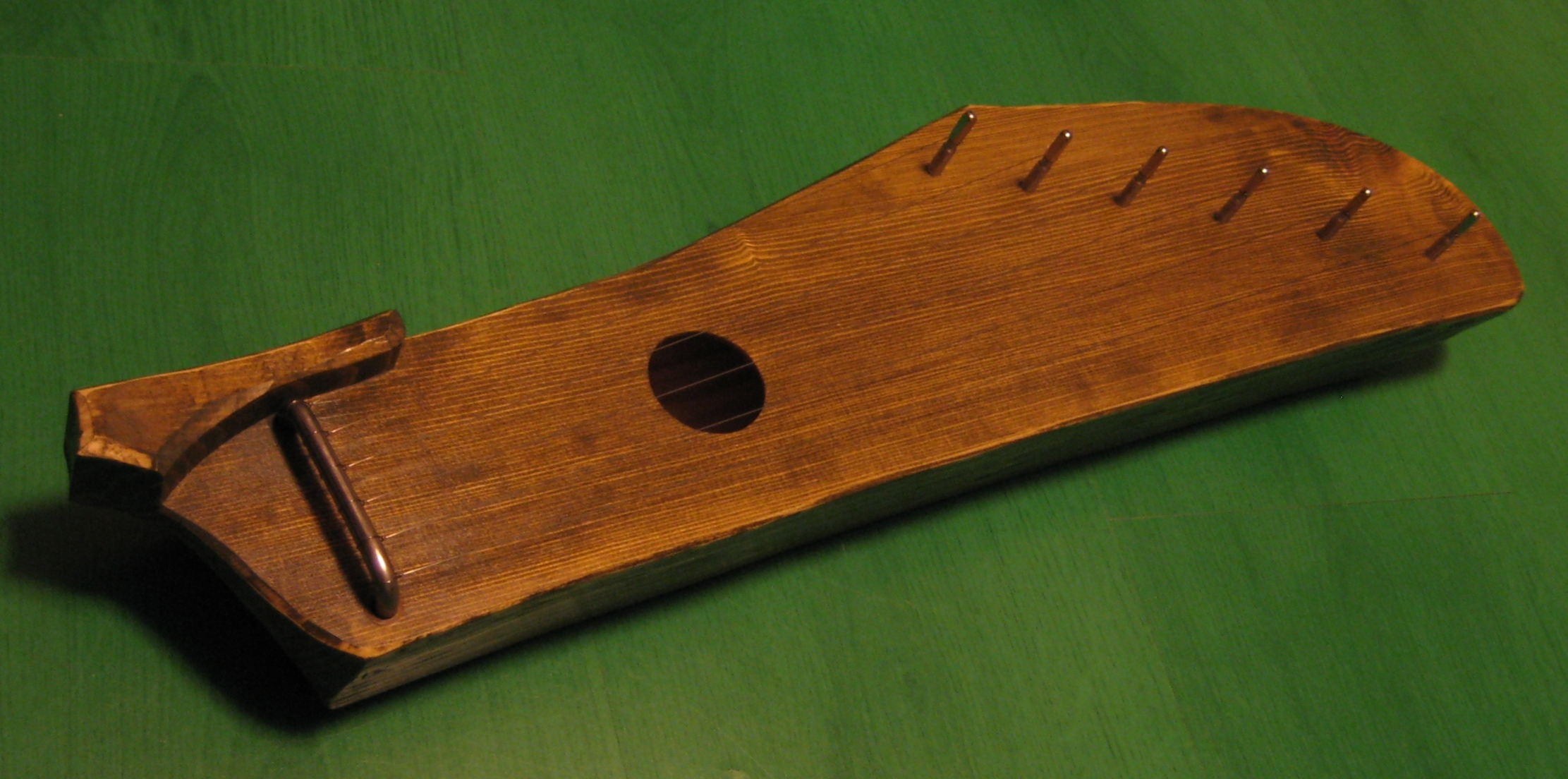
An Estonian six stringed kannel

After the Estonian national awakening the first professional Estonian musicians emerged. The most significant were Rudolf Tobias (1873–1918) and Artur Kapp (1878–1952). Other composers followed, such as Mart Saar (1882–1963), Artur Lemba (1885–1963), Heino Eller (1887–1970) and Cyrillus Kreek (1889–1962).

== 20th century ==
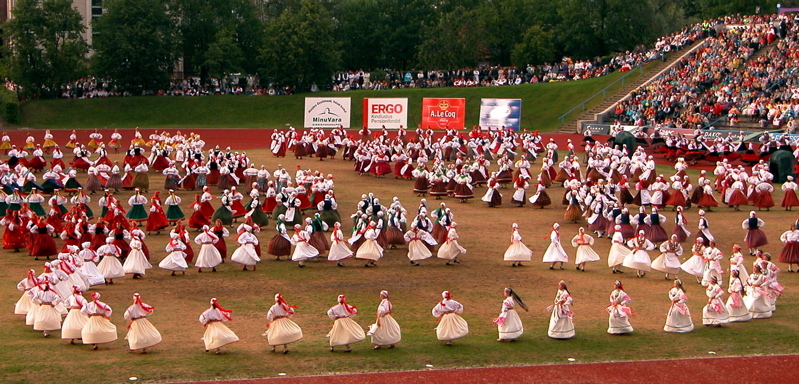
Ring Dance in XVII Estonian Dance Celebration (2004)

In the 1960s, the Soviet communist authorities began encouraging forms of ethnic folk art from various parts of the former USSR and Eastern Bloc. Local ethnographic bands were formed after Leiko, a choir from Värska, came together in 1964, while a less regionally distinct form of Estonian folk music was soon promoted, Estonian ring dance beginning with the formation of Leigarid in 1969. The 1950s and 60s also saw the publication of Herbert Tampere's Eesti rahvalaule viisidega ("Estonian folk songs with melodies"), a collection of folk songs. The first LP of traditional music, Eesti rahvalaule ja pillilugusid ("Estonian folk songs and instrumental pieces") was released in 1967. In the 1980s, a series of musical festivals took place that helped stimulate the increasing popular demands for freedom of expression (these included the 1985 conference of CIOFF, the 1986 Viru säru and 1989's Baltica), leading to the nonviolent Singing Revolution of 1989, and Estonia's bloodless regaining of independence in 1991.

In the 1950s, Estonian baritone Georg Ots rose to worldwide prominence as an opera singer.

Estonia also produced a number of classical composers of high repute during the twentieth century, including: Miina Härma (1864–1941), Rudolf Tobias (1873–1918), Heino Eller (1887–1970), Artur Kapp (1878–1952), Artur Lemba (1885–1963), Mart Saar (1882–1963), Lepo Sumera (1950–2000), Eduard Tubin (1905–1982), Veljo Tormis (1930–2017) and the living composers mentioned below.

== Today ==
There are several yearly music festivals of Estonia.

These celebrations of traditional life have inspired multiple later composers who modernized traditional music, including Olev Muska and Coralie Joyce, Kirile Loo, Veljo Tormis and the Estonian-Australian choir Kiri-uu. Other modern Estonian musicians include the influential composers René Eespere (1953–), Ester Mägi (1922– 2021), Arvo Pärt (1935–), Jaan Rääts (1932–2020), Urmas Sisask (1960–2022), and Erkki-Sven Tüür (1959–). Conductor Neeme Järvi has had a long and distinguished international career. His sons Paavo Järvi and Kristjan Järvi are both also conductors, and his daughter Maarika Järvi is a flutist.

The indie folk rock band Ewert and The Two Dragons are among the best known Estonian bands, having had success in Europe and signing with Warner Bros. Records and winning the European Border Breakers Award in 2012. The girl band Vanilla Ninja were also one of the best-known Estonian bands before their hiatus. In addition, artists such as Hortus Musicus, Kerli, Vaiko Eplik & Eliit, Iiris, NOËP, Miljardid and Trad.Attack! have gained popularity outside Estonia.

Metsatöll is a folk-metal band combining runo-song and traditional folk instruments with metal. Another Estonian folk metal group was Raud-ants.

Contemporary artists include Jüri Pootsmann, Tanel Padar and Ott Lepland. Today, many music festivals are held, such as Eesti Laul.

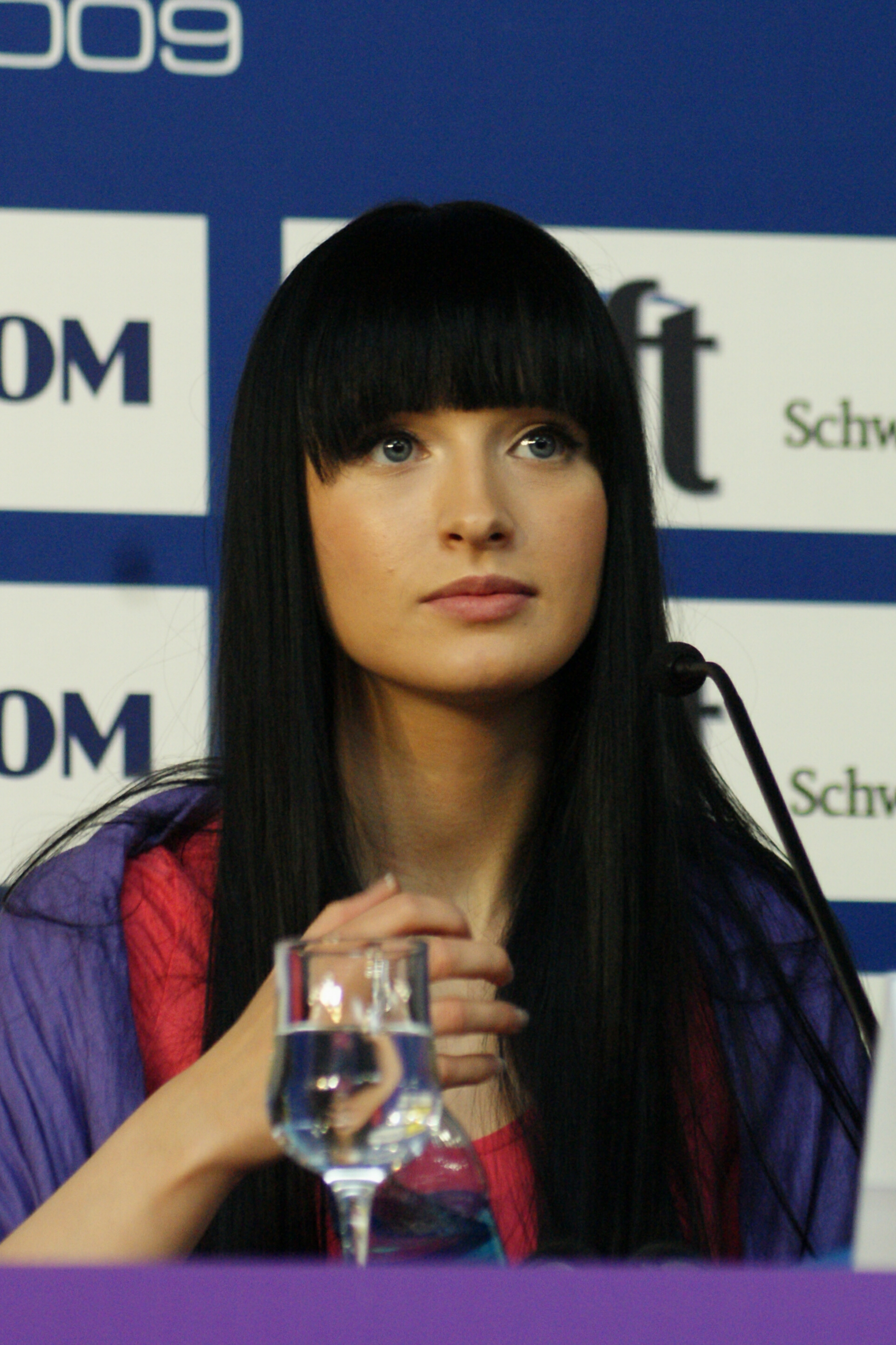
Sandra Nurmsalu, Urban Symphony

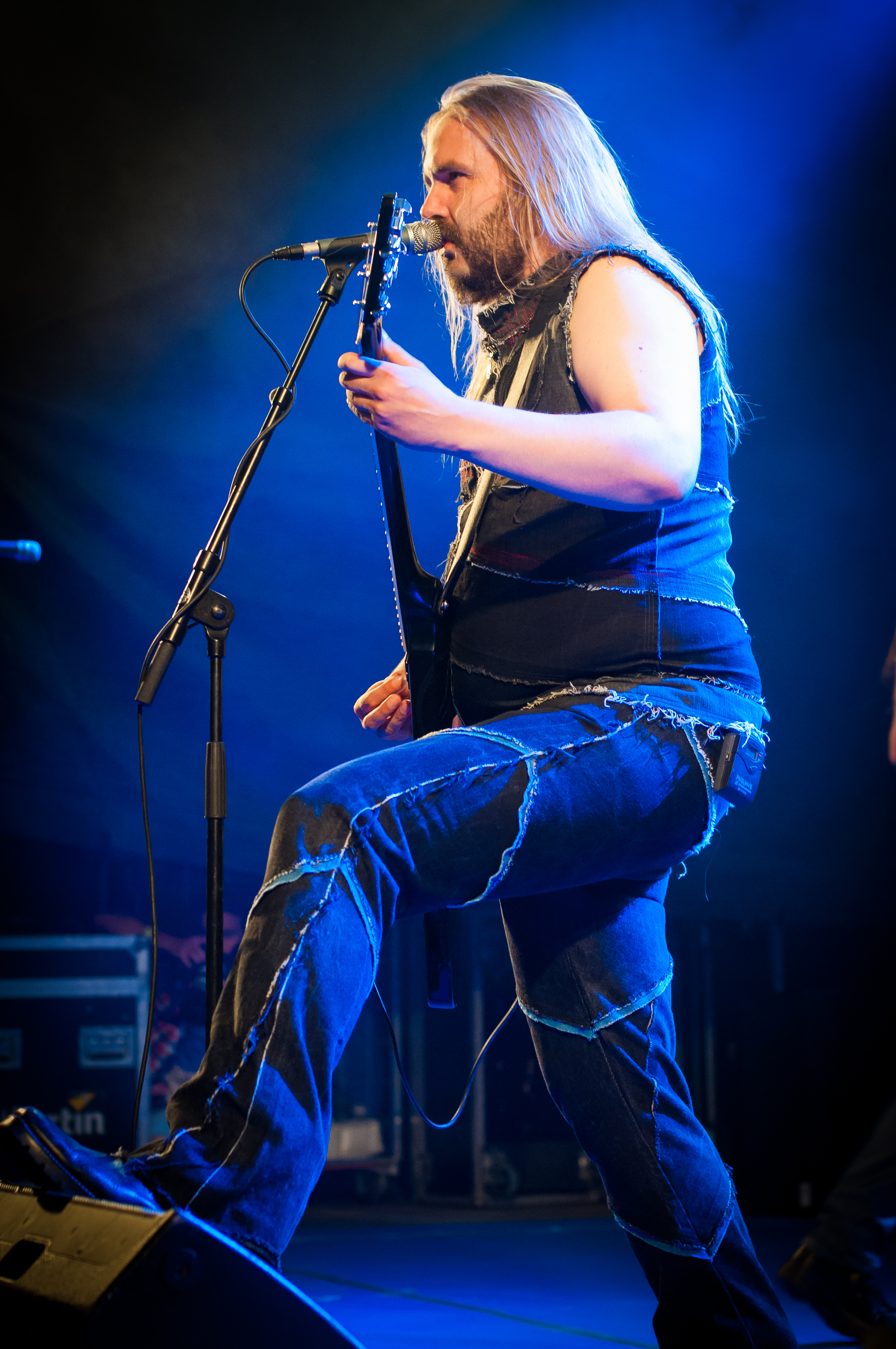
Metsatöll

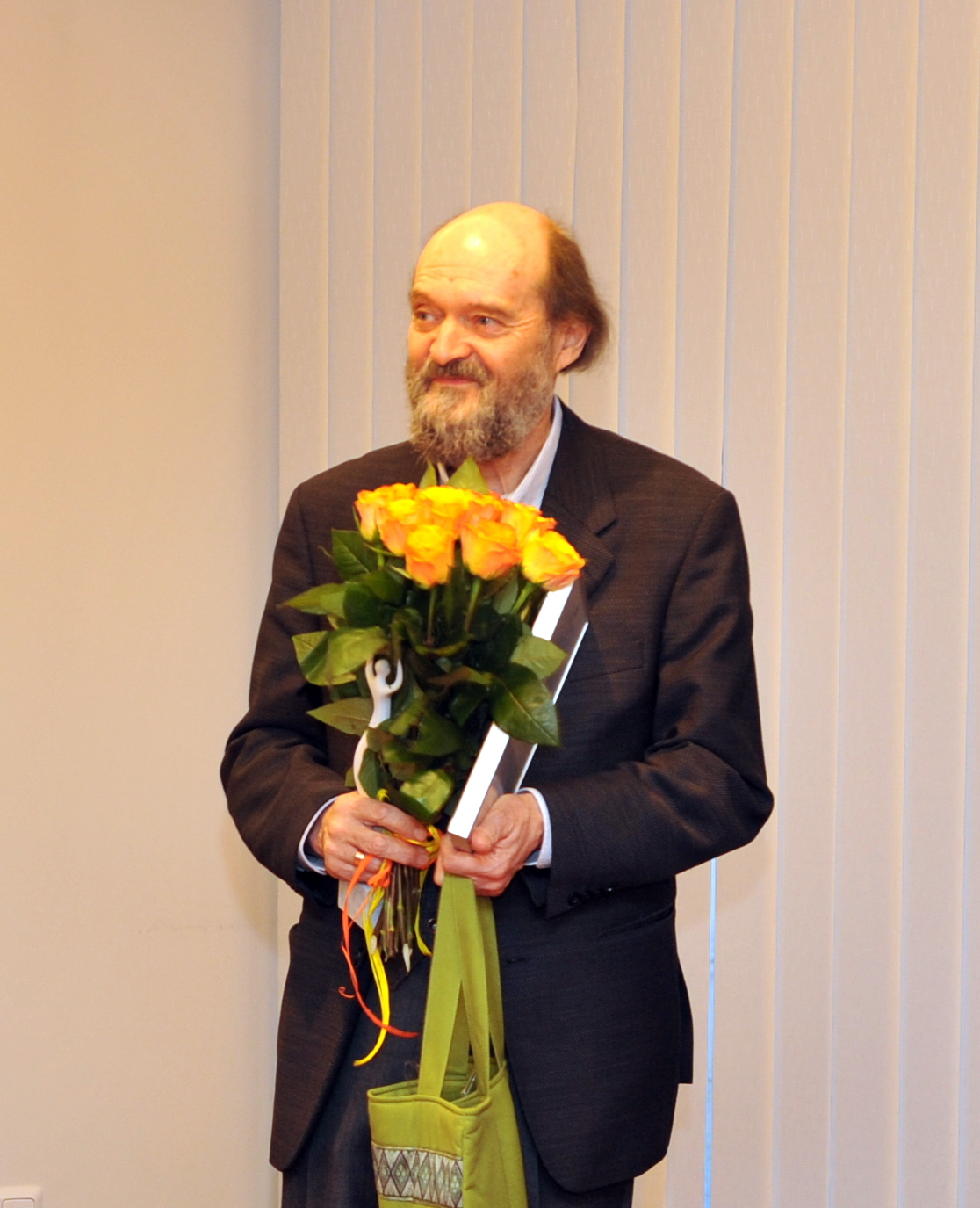
Arvo Pärt

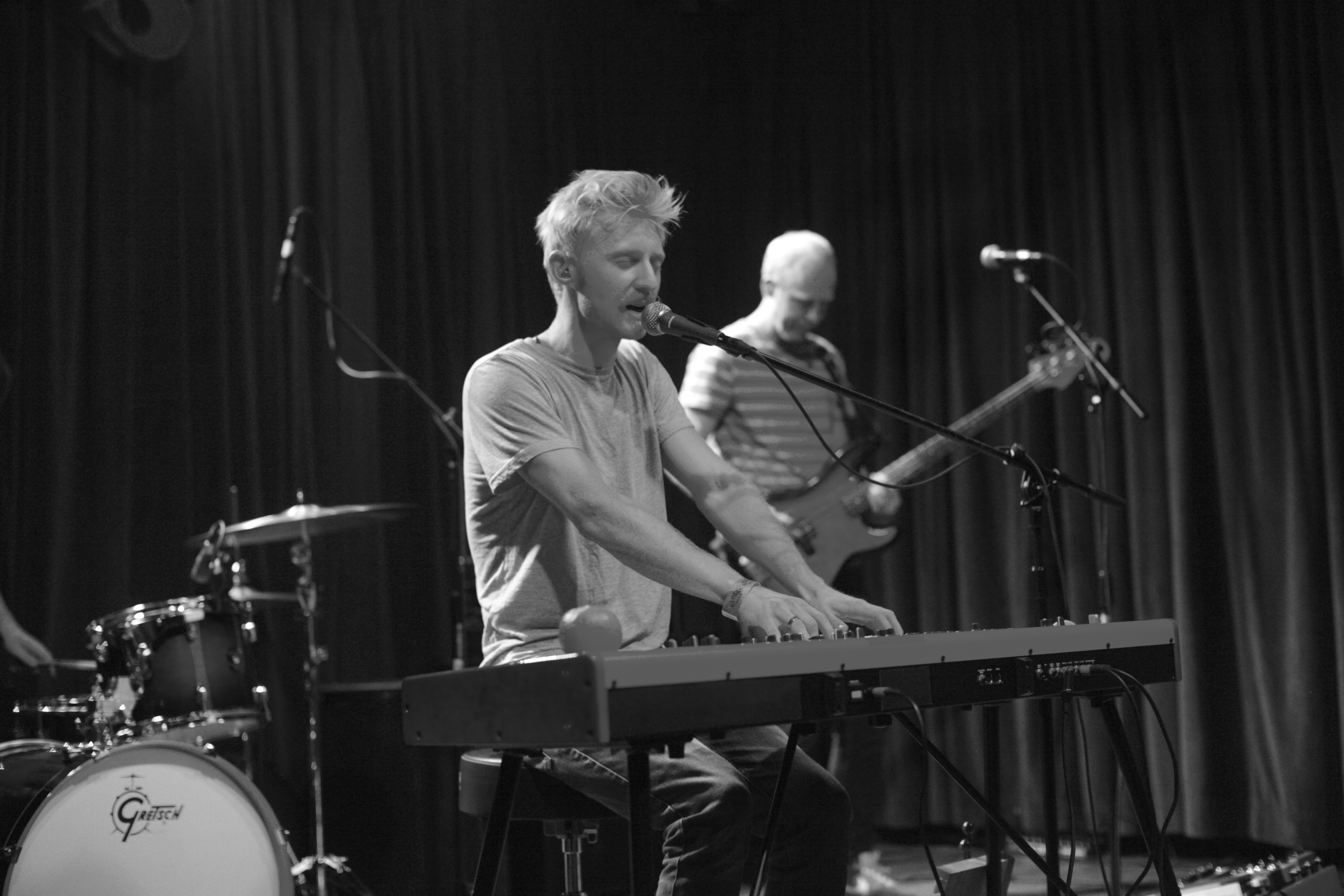
Ewert and the Two Dragons

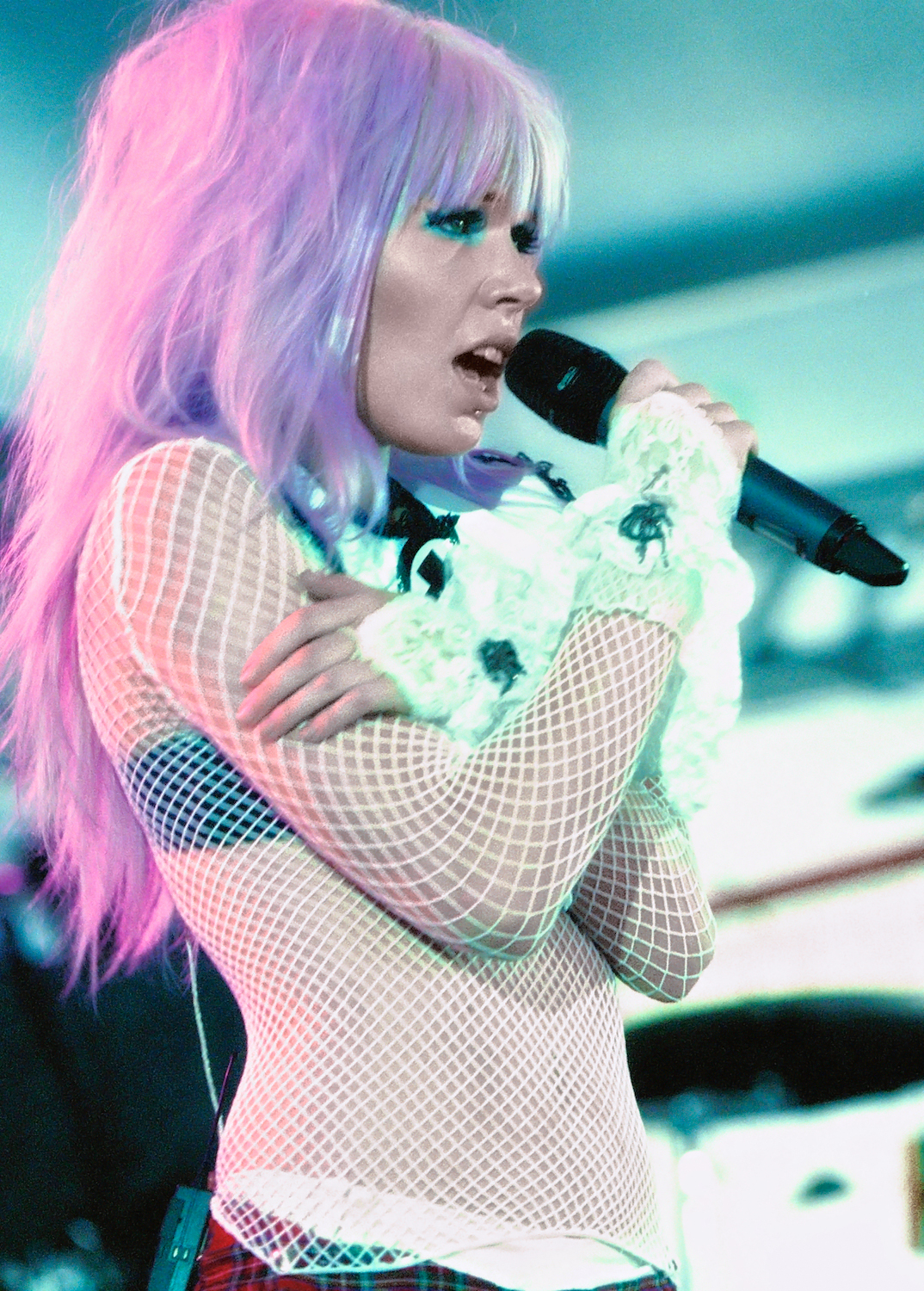
Kerli

== See also ==
- Estonia in the Eurovision Song Contest
- Estonian Song Festival
- List of Estonian composers
- List of Estonian choirs
- Estonian rock
- Viljandi Folk Music Festival
