= Krigul =

Krigul is an Estonian surname. Notable people with the surname include:

- Merle Krigul (born 1954), Estonian philologist and politician
- Ülo Krigul (born 1978), Estonian composer
- Vambola Krigul (born 1981), Estonian percussionist, chamber musician and singer
