= Tatjana Kozlova-Johannes =

Estonian-Russian composer (born 1977)

Tatjana Kozlova-Johannes (born 8 January 1977 in Narva) is an Estonian-Russian composer.

In 2000s, she graduated from Estonian Academy of Music and Theatre in composition speciality.

As of about 2020, she is teaching the composition at Georg Ots Tallinn Music School.

In 2015, she received Annual Prize of the Endowment for Music of the Cultural Endowment of Estonia.

Since 2004, she is a member of Estonian Composers' Union.

She received in 2022 the Lepo Sumera Composition Prize.

== Works ==
=== Chamber works ===
- Prisma (2001) for piano
- Changeable [Muutlik] (2002) for flute, Estonian zither
- kuumast klaasist tehtud [made of hot glass] (2003) for 2 flutes, alto flute, oboe, 2 clarinets/bass clarinet, bassoon, contrabassoon, horn, trombone, percussion, strings
- Võilillede lumi [Snow of Dandelions] (2003) for 4 flutes
- When I Was in Love [Siis, kui ma armastasin...] (2003) for violin
- Circles (2004) for flute, clarinet, violin, cello, percussion, piano
- Converting into Steam (2005) for 3 saxophones, double bass
- Doors 2 (2006) for flute, clarinet/bass clarinet, percussion, piano, violin, viola, cello, double bass
- Doors 2a [version] (2007) for flute, clarinet, violin, cello, piano, percussion
- Liikumatuse dimensioon / Dimension of Quiescence (Version of the piece written in 2009) (2010) for alto saxophone (clarinet or bass clarinet), percussion
- Horizontals [Horisontaalid] (2010) for flute, clarinet, violin, cello, percussion, piano
- Lovesong (2010) for violin, flute
- Towards Inward (Dissolution) [Suunaga sissepoole (Lahustumine)] (2011) for violin, cello, guitar, piano
- Disintegration Chain (2011) for flute, clarinet, percussion, sound object, violin, cello
- Eddy Current [Pöörisvool] (2012) for flute, piano
- Quicksilver (2012) for cello
- Lost Motion (2013) for saxophone quartet
- 8 Shades of My Shadow (2013) for kannel, harpsichord, harp
- White Bird [Valge lind] (2013) for bassoon, 2 violins, viola, cello, double bass
- Lovesong [version] (2015) for flute, violin, ensemble (clarinet, cello, piano)
- Six Bangs to Mister Boulez [Kuus pauku Härra Boulezi terviseks] (2015) for ensemble (2 lineups)
- Crasis (2016) for flute, clarinet, violin, cello
- Corners [Nurgad] (2017) for flute, clarinet, violin, cello, percussion, piano, electric guitars
- A Dance (2018) for flute, bass clarinet, harp, percussion
- Longing for Darkness (2018) for saxophone or clarinet, violin, cello, piano
- To Sing a Song Before the Night Comes (2020) for flute, bass clarinet, piano
- Black and White [Must ja Valge] (2021) for ensemble (two lineups)
- Mat'Selesnya (2022) for prepared piano & whirly tubes
- Through the Black Hole (2022) for piano
- Ainult õhk [Just Air] (2023) for flute, clarinet, violin, cello, piano, percussion

=== Orchestral works ===
- Karje vari [The Shadow of the Scream] (2004) for symphony orchestra
- Lighting the Fire [Tule süütamine] (2015) for symphony orchestra
- Creation [Loomine] (Part of a joint composition "Hiroshima - Nagasaki" together with composers Malle Maltis, Liisa Hirsch, Tatjana Kozlova-Johannes, Helena Tulve, Toivo Tulev and Eugene Birman) (2017) for string orchestra
- Orchestration and developments of Manfred MIM's opera "Estonian History. A Nation Born of Shock" (2017) for soloists, mixed choir, symphony orchestra
- Piano Concerto "Blow Your House Down" (2020) for piano, string orchestra
- Dark Wings (2022) for percussion, orchestra

=== Vocal works ===
- Tišina (Vaikus) [Silence] (2003) for vocal ensemble (or tenor), oboe, 2 violins, viola, cello, double bass
- Intermezzo jääs [Ice Intermezzo] (2004) for mixed choir
- Water Shards [Vee killud] (2008) for soprano, violin, flute
- No Selfhood (2008) for soloist, male choir
- Fountain 1 [Purskkaev 1] (2008) for 4 voices
- Tightrope Walker [Köielkõndija] (2009) for voice, flute, Estonian kannel, cello
- Summer Rain 2 [Suvevihm 2] (2009) for mixed choir, amateur symphony orchestra
- No Selfhood (Version of the piece of the same name written in 2008) (2010) for mixed choir
- Fountain 2 [Purskkaev 2] (2011) for voice, percussion (3 players)
- Three Feathers [Kolm sulekest] (2012) for voice, flute, cello, kannel, sound objects
- How to Draw a Door? [Kuidas joonistada ust] (2012) for solo voice, bass flute, kannel ad libitum
- Fall (2014) for soprano, bass, clarinet, percussion, double bass
- Letters [Kirjad] (2014) for soprano, viola
- Valgused [Lights] (2015) for 4 voices
- To My End and to Its End… (2017) for mixed choir
- I Will Cross This Road (2018) for mixed choir, male choir, string quartet
- Just One Breath (2018) for soprano, piano
- Fall (Version of the piece written in 2014) (2019) for soprano, bass clarinet, percussion, cello
- The Beauty of Decay [Lagunemise ilu] (2019) for voice, reader, DYI contrabass flute, guitar, kannel, violin, double bass, sound objects

=== Theatrical works ===
- Music for dance performance "Tempo" (co-author Helena Tulve) (2017) for tape, sound objects
- Music for dance performance "Juures" [Muusika tantsuetendusele "Juures"] (2020) for electroacoustical work
- söövitab.tuhk [etching.ash] (2022)

=== Electroacoustic works ===
- Doors 1 (2005) for flute, tape
- Jääkurvid [Ice Curves] (2012) for percussion (1 player), live electronics, tape
- Aaria [Aria] (2021) for electronics

=== Audiovisual works ===
- Dimension of Quiescence [Liikumatuse dimensioon] (2009) for alto saxophone, percussion, video (Tarvo Hanno Varres)
- Music for documentary film "Kalamees" [Fisherman] (2009)
- Music for documentary film "Naine" [Woman] (2009)
- Silent Witness (2018) for flute, clarinet, piano, percussion, violin, cello, fixed media, VR video (video created by Rein Zobel)

=== Works for unspecified instrumentation ===
- 30 Scales and Postlude (2011) (from one chromatic instrument to orchestra. In case of monodic instruments, please select more than four)
- Niidiotsad [Clews] (2015) for open instrumentation (starting with 6 players, preferably 8 and more)

=== Works for children ===
- Four Piano Pieces [Neli klaveripala] (2003) for piano (or kannel)
- Summer Rain [Suvevihm] (2006) for boys' choir
- Polaarpäeva algus / The Beginning of the Polar Day (2010) for flute, piano
- Journey of the Lionfish [Tiibkala teekond] (2019) for kannel
- Down from the Hill/Up to the Hill [Mäest alla/mäest üles] (2019) for kannel
