= Hedi Viisma =

Estonian musician

Hedi Viisma (born 1979) is an Estonian chromatic kantele artist. She began studies on her instrument, the kantele, at the age of seven and later earned a diploma in performance from the Georg Ots Conservatory in her native Tallinn, and a master's degree at the Sibelius Academy in Helsinki, Finland, where she studied under Ritva Koistinen, Finland's premier kantele pedagogue. Viisma is currently based in Helsinki, pursuing a doctoral degree at the Sibelius Academy, where she also coaches chamber music. Additionally, she holds the post of Lecturer at the Estonian Academy of Music and Theater.

From its roots as a six-string folk zither, the kantele has grown over the last half century into a full-fledged concert instrument, and Viisma has consistently been at the forefront of its technical and structural development through her commissions, transcriptions and work with instrument makers. Viisma's repertoire spans a wide variety of styles and periods, ranging from Renaissance and Baroque keyboard and lute works to piano music of the early twentieth century and new works composed especially for her. Her kantele model, a five-octave, sixty-one-string chromatic instrument, was debuted in 2010. Designed in collaboration with master kantele craftsman Otto Koistinen of Rääkkylä, Finland, the instrument is set to become the concert standard for the chromatic kantele. Hedi Viisma has recorded music by Bach for the Finnish IMU label, and has performed many new works for broadcast in Finland and Estonia. Her album “Reflections”, with cellist Seeli Toivio, was released in 2011, and features works by Vivaldi, Schubert, Rimsky-Korsakov and Pärt.

Since 2006 Hedi has been working at Koistinen Kantele, the leading kantele manufacturer in Finland.
