= Sophie Sooäär =

Estonian actress, singer, and dancer

- Born: 27 September 1914; Pärnu, Governorate of Livonia, Russian Empire
- Died: 14 March 1996 (aged 81); Tallinn, Estonia
- Other names: Sofie Sooäär; Sophie Rathfelder; Sophie Moisar
- Occupations: Actress, singer
- Years active: 1934–1976
- Spouse(s): Unknown Rathfelder (1935–1941); Dr. Erich Johannes Moisar (1961-1977; his death)

Sophie Sooäär (27 September 1914 – 14 March 1996) was an Estonian stage, television, and film actress and singer and dancer.

== Early life and education ==
Sophie Sooäär (occasionally credited as Sofie Sooäär) was born in Pärnu in 1914. She attended schools in Pärnu, graduating from secondary school in 1931; afterward, she studied dressmaking until 1934.

== Stage career ==
In 1934, Sooäär began an engagement at the Endla Theatre in her hometown of Pärnu as an actress and dancer. From 1941 until 1944, she performed as a soloist at the theatre. In 1944, she joined the Estonia Theatre in Tallinn as a soloist. However, the building which housed the Estonia song and drama society theatre and the Estonian National Opera was bombed and heavily damaged by Soviet air raids on 9 March 1944. She would return to the stages of the theatre and the Estonian National Opera once the building was reopened to the public in 1947. After the dissolution of the Estonia song and drama society in 1949, she remained at the Estonian National Opera as an actress and singer until 1971.

During her long career onstage at the Estonia Theatre, Sooäär performed in a number of stage plays, musicals and particularly operettas and was frequently paired with actor and singer Endel Pärn. Among her more memorable roles at the theatre, were works by composers such as: Franz Lehar, Priit Ardna, Hans Pflanzer, Emmerich Kálmán, Sigmund Romberg, Johann Strauss II, Rudolf Friml, Herbert Stothart, Franz Schubert, Edgar Arro, Leo Normet, Parashkev Hadjiev, Frederick Loewe, Ülo Raudmäe, Gerd Natschinski and Mitch Leigh.

== Film and television ==
Sophie Sooäär's first film appearances was in the 1955 Aleksandr Mandrõkin directed musical concert film Kui saabub õhtu for Tallinna Kinostuudio, showcasing Estonian singers, dancers and actors in productions of performing arts pieces. The film, featuring many members of the Estonian National Opera, features Sooäär as Linda, wife of Kalev and mother of the giant Kalevipoeg, in a performance of composer Eugen Kapp's ballet Kalevipoeg, inspired by Estonian mythology and choreographed by Estonian ballet masters Ida Urbel and Udo Väljaots.

In 1968, she appeared in the Sulev Nõmmik directed black-and-white television comedy film Mehed ei nuta, penned by Sulev Nõmmik and Enn Vetemaa for Eesti Telefim. Sooäär played the role of a farmhouse nurse to a group of insomniacs who have been taken to a remote island and given harsh and exhaustive (but sleepless) therapy and attempt to escape. The film has become extremely popular in Estonia and is still frequently broadcast on Estonian television.

In 1970, she appeared as Maria in the Veljo Käsper directed drama Tuulevaikus, based on the 1965 Einar Maasik penned novel Tuisu Taavi seitse päeva for Tallinnfilm. This was followed a year later by the role of Donna Laura in the Arvo Kruusement directed color film musical comedy Don Juan Tallinnas, starring Latvian actress Gunta Virkava in the title role of Don Juan, who arrives in Tallinn and is unwittingly waiting to be seduced by the city's women and challenged to duels by the city's men, not realizing that Don Juan is actually a woman disguised as a man and trading off of the real Don Juan's notoriety. Don Juan Tallinnas was based on the play Tookord Sevillas by Samuil Alyoshin and also produced by Tallinnfilm.

In 1974, Sooäär had a minor role in the 1974 Veljo Käsper directed World War II themed youth adventure film Ohtlikud mängud. This was her last film role.

== Personal life ==
Between 1934 and 1941, Sophie Sooäär was married to a man with the surname Rathfelder. In 1961, she married Dr. Erich Johannes Moisar. The two remained married until his death in 1977. Sooäär did not remarry. She died in Tallinn in 1996 at age 81 and was buried in Tallinn's Forest Cemetery.
