= Timo Steiner =

Estonian composer

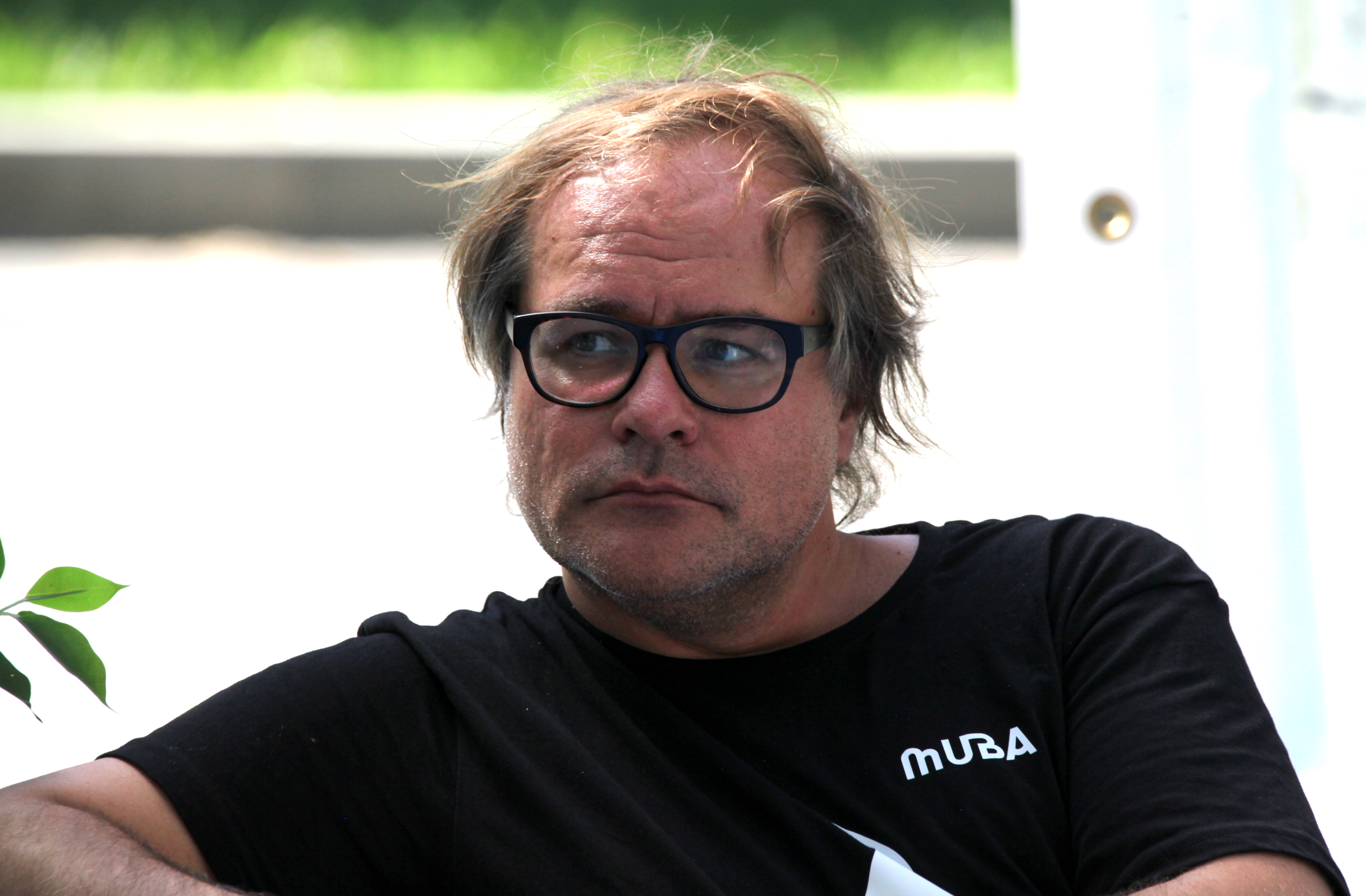
Timo Steiner

Timo Steiner (born 6 May 1976 in Tallinn) is an Estonian composer.

In 1999, he graduated from Estonian Academy of Music and Theatre in composition speciality.

In 1997, he founded Bowed Piano Ensemble, and was also its artistic director.

Since 2000, he has been the artistic director for Estonian Music Days.

Since 1999, he is a member of Estonian Composers' Union.

== Works ==
- 1999 cantata "Until We Meet"
- 2003 "Salute to Europe"
- "Sunrise Academy"
