= Otto Koistinen =

Finnish kantele maker (1925–2020)

Otto Koistinen (August 7, 1925 - February 22, 2020) was a Finnish kantele maker who specialized in building acoustic kanteles and Estonian kannel. He started to make his first kanteles in 1957 while he was working as a pilot on Pielinen Lake in North Karelia, and also built a few mandolins and guitars. 10 years later he found kantele drawings in the library of a hospital in Kontioniemi. During the winter he built his first kantele in the sauna of Ahveninen pilot station. Otto had a deep respect and close relationship with nature and he wanted to bring the beauty of Karelian nature into his kanteles. This unique tradition of kantele sound is in the essence of work by Koistinen Kantele.

As the first instrument was completed during winter 1957, Koistinen found out a number of lacks in construction and sound and thus lifetime development of Finnish and later Estonian chromatic kanteles was initiated. The influence of the family has always had an important role in this process. Otto’s daughter, Ritva Koistinen, started to play kantele at early age showing high level of talent and thus brought motivation for her father’s work. Otto's son Hannu Koistinen started to build kanteles with his father at the age of seven and later continued to develop the instrument and preserve family tradition by establishing Koistinen Kantele company.

In 2010 Otto Koistinen received the Master Kantele Builder Honorary title from The Finnish Guild of Masters Craftsmen.

In the past years Otto Koistinen has devoted most of his time to building chromatic kanteles based on Estonian tradition. Among the players who have played his instruments are Kristi Mühling, Hedi Viisma, Anna-Liisa Eller, Ella Maidre and others. Otto Koistinen died at the age of 94 in 2020; he continued working on kantele development until he turned 90 years old.
