= Malle (given name) =

Female given name

- Gender: Female
- Language: Estonian
- Name day: 22 July

Origin
- Region of origin: Estonia

Other names
- Related names: Magdaleena, Mall, Leen, Leena, Leeni, Made, Madli, Magda

Malle is an Estonian feminine given name, occasionally used as a diminutive of the name Magdaleena.

As of 1 January 2023, 2,775 women in Estonia bear the first name Malle, making it the 47th most popular female name in the country. People bearing the name Malle include:

- Malle Juhkam, Estonian Paralympic long jumper
- Malle Leis, (1940–2017), Estonian painter and graphic artist
- Malle Maltis (born 1977), Estonian composer
- Malle Pärn (born 1945), Estonian actress, theologian, publicist and politician
- Malle Talvet-Mustonen (born 1955), Estonian translator, poet and diplomat
- Malle Treial (born 1945), Estonian actress
