= Koistinen Kantele =

Finnish kantele manufacturer

Koistinen Kantele is a manufacturer of kanteles, traditional plucked string instruments of the dulcimer and zither family native to Finland. Located in Rääkkylä, North Karelia, Finland, its current CEO is Hannu Koistinen, and it is a family business. Officially founded in 2000, its history dates back to 1957, when Otto Koistinen built his first kanteles.

The company makes both acoustic and electric kanteles, and introduced the kantele as a modern instrument and developed high-level kantele amplifying equipment. Koistinen Kantele has long ago established itself as a leading kantele manufacturer in Finland; at present moment more than 50 Finnish music institutions are equipped with various models of kanteles by Koistinen.

Koistinen Kantele staff in Rääkkylä

== History ==
The company's history dates back to 1957, when Otto Koistinen made his first kanteles. Otto's daughter Ritva Koistinen started to play kantele at an early age and demonstrated a high level of musical talent, motivating Otto to build higher quality instruments. Later, Ritva Koistinen became the first traditional playing lecturer in Finland at the Joensuu Music Institute, and in 1987, she founded the solo kantele department at the Sibelius Academy in Helsinki. Soon after its establishment, the company became the biggest manufacturer of kanteles and has remained at the top since then.

Son of Otto Koistinen and the brother to Ritva Koistinen, Hannu Koistinen (born 1966) is a developer and designer of many kantele models in the Koistinen Kantele collection. Koistinen's innovations have expanded the image of the kantele, making it suitable for a wider variety of musical styles.

=== First modern concert kanteles ===
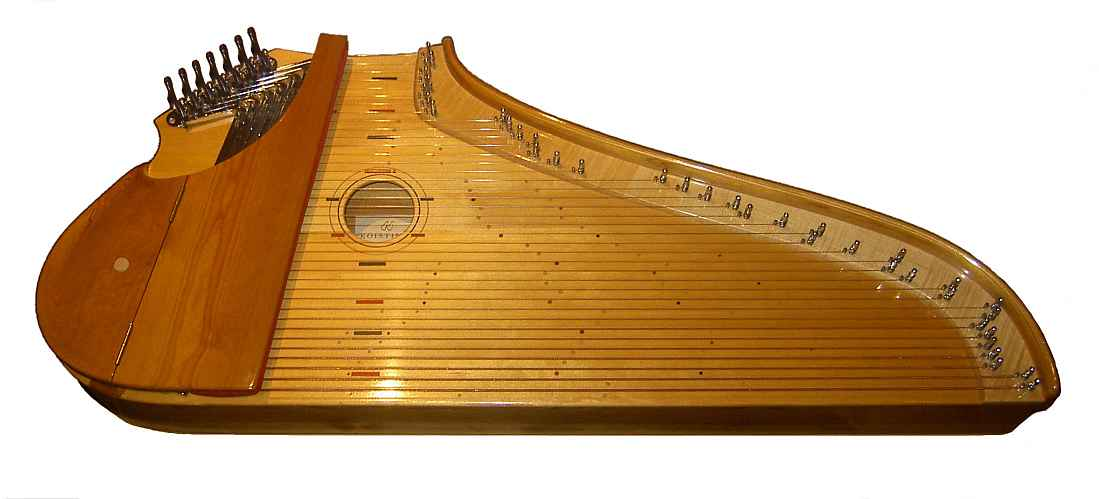
The first generation Koistinen concert kantele, No. H:8 made by Hannu Koistinen, 1993

In 1990–1993, Hannu Koistinen developed the first modern 38-string Concert Kantele model. Based on Paul Salminen's models, the instruments included new lever positions, a fully opening damper, and new string measurements, and which set a new standard of the kantele as a professional instrument.

The breakthrough was sped up by a double-blind concert kantele test in 1993. The concert was held at a musical instrument building school in Ikaalinen where two of the instruments placed first and second in a group of seven builders and eight kanteles. This further cemented the brand of new kantele models.

Besides Ritva Koistinen, among the many artists playing the Koistinen concert series are Timo Väänänen, Eva Alkula, Eija Kankaanranta, and Senni Eskelinen. Several patents were accepted and instruments featured more innovations like stronger string tension to allow a wider range of dynamics as well as bigger acoustic volume. In 1995, a 39-string model was added to the series.

=== First electric kantele ===
The next step in the modernization process was the invention of Koistinen Electric 1, the first fully developed 39-string solid-body electric kantele. The instrument was introduced at the 150th anniversary of Kalevala at Helsinki Ice Hockey Hall on 28 February 1999 where Timo Väänänen played it.

The model offered a player a new range of opportunities as an instrument suitable for a variety of musical styles and as a band instrument that could be used at any size venue. As the Finnish kantele's main features have always been its gentle and sensitive sound, it was necessary to make serious developments in its construction, aiming to get more volume and high quality amplifying. The main change is that two built-in microphones enable the entire range of the instrument to be balanced without altering the genuine sound too much. Another feature is the position in which the instrument had to be played: Instead of being placed on the table with a player sitting, the Electric 1 made to be played while standing. It has its own table that is tilted forward so the audience has a better view of the player's hands and the instrument's strings.

=== Modern Wing kantele collection ===
In 2001 the company introduced the Wing Collection which includes small modern kanteles with 5 to 15 strings and are in the shape of a pine seed. The prototype for this concept is grounded with the idea of the ancient Russian gusli and Latvian kokle. The models have a colorful design and come equipped with built-in pickups, shoulder straps, and levers.

=== More recent history ===
Since 2000, Koistinen Kantele has grown to a company of ten. This team includes professionals in different areas, and staff from outside Finland.Olga Shishkina is the first foreigner who graduated as a Master of Music in Finnish kantele from Sibelius Academy.

In 2010 Eero Broman became a part owner and a chairman of the Koistinen Kantele board. The same year, Ritva Koistinen became the second kantele artist after Ulla Katajavuori to perform at Carnegie Hall in New York. Today, Koistinen Kantele has several owners including staff and suppliers, as well as the Koistinen family.

== Awards ==
In 2006 the Koistinen Electric 1 was featured in the publication Finnish Design Yearbook along with Marimekko and Iittala products. On 21 April 2012 the company was awarded the Rantasalmi Prize, a Finnish award in woodworking given by the Finnish Cultural Foundation's South Savolax regional fund. They received the award for the remarkable improvement of the quality, sound, and design of its kantele and raising the image of the national instrument of Finland as a modern and high-quality instrument.
