= Hannu Koistinen =

Finnish kantele maker

Hannu Koistinen (born 1966, in Joensuu) is a Finnish kantele maker, founder and CEO of Koistinen Kantele. He is the son of the renowned kantele builder Otto Koistinen and the brother of Ritva Koistinen, a kantele artist and the founder of classical kantele education at Sibelius Academy. He started to work at his father’s workshop at the age of 7 and since 1989 he has been focusing on developing and modernising kanteles.

In 1990–1993 Koistinen created the first modern 38-string concert kantele models. Based on Paul Salminen’s drawings from 1920s, the instruments however included many innovations such as new lever positions, fully open damper and new string measurements specially invented for the use in art music. The latter made it possible to produce wider dynamic range on the kantele than ever before.

In 1993 two Koistinen’s instruments won a double-blind concert kantele test hold at musical instrument building school in Ikaalinen. This achievement made a start for his professional career as a kantele builder as well as helped create a strong brand vision for new kantele models. Since then Koistinen concert kanteles gained a respected position within kantele circles. The first 39-string kantele which was built in 1995 is still used at Sibelius Academy.

In 1999 Koistinen designed and built the first solid body electric kantele. A 39-string instrument supplied with 2 microphone systems, contact and magnetic, has opened an entirely new perspective of the kantele. The problem of audibility was now solved and the instrument could be incorporated in a band. Koistinen Electric 1 was featured in Finnish Design Yearbook 2006 along with the products by Marimekko and Iittala.

In 2012 Koistinen Kantele was awarded with Rantasalmi Prize, a Finnish award in the area of wooden products. The award was given because of the remarkable improvement of the quality, sound and design of Finnish kantele and raise of the Finnish national instrument as a modern and high quality instrument of our time.

Among the kantele artists who have played Koistinen’s instruments are Timo Väänänen, Ritva Koistinen, Eva Alkula, Eija Kankaanranta, Senni Eskelinen, Olga Shishkina and others.
