= Sooäär =

Sooäär is an Estonian surname, meaning "swamp edge". Notable people with the surname include:

- Imre Sooäär (1969–2025), Estonian businessman and politician
- Sophie Sooäär (1914–1996), Estonian actress and singer
