= Incantatio maris aestuosi =

1966 musical composition by Veljo Tormis

Incantatio maris aestuosi ("Incantation for a Stormy Sea") is an a cappella choral composition by the Estonian composer Veljo Tormis completed in 1996. The piece was commissioned by the Swedish Orphei Drängar and Finnish YL Male Voice Choir male choirs in remembrance of the victims of the MS Estonia ferry that sank on September 28, 1994. The piece is about six minutes in length.

== Text ==
The text of the piece is from the 18th and 42nd songs of the Finnish national epic Kalevala. The Latin translation of Kalevala from 1986 by Tuomo Pekkanen is used. Latin was chosen as the commissioning choirs conditioned that the choirs' native languages Finnish and Swedish should not be used.

== Recordings ==
- YL Male Voice Choir on Best of Ylioppilaskunnan Laulajat (2008)
- Cantus on There Lies the Home (2006)
- The Vocal Consort on "Incantations" (2012)
- Orphei Drängar on "Tormis: Curse upon Iron - Works for male choir" (2012)
