= Leo Normet =

Estonian composer (1922–1995)

Leo Normet (17 September 1922 – 27 December 1995) was an Estonian composer and musicologist.

== Life and career ==
Normet was born on 17 September 1922 in Pärnu, in the Republic of Estonia.

He first took lessons in composition from Eugen Kapp, with whom he played in state ensembles of the Estonian SSR during World War II. In 1950, he graduated from Tallinn State Conservatory in composition speciality.

From 1954, he taught music history at Tallinn State Conservatory.

As a musicologist, he was focused on Jean Sibelius' legacy.

He was one of the founders of Estonian Music Council in 1992, and also its first chairman.

From 1945 onwards, he was a member of Estonian Composers' Union.

He died on 8 December 1995 in Tallinn.

== Legacy ==
A memorial concert in commemoration of Normet's 101st birthday was held in the Arvo Pärt Centre on 17 September 2023. The concert was hosted by Sirje Normet and Alo Põldmäe, Leo's former student.

== Works ==
- operetta "Hermese kannul" (1946; with Boris Kõrver)
- operetta "Rummu Jüri" (1954; with Edgar Arro)
- operetta "Tuled kodusadamas" (1958; with Edgar Arro)
- operetta "Stella Polaris" (1961)
- opera "Valgus Koordis" (1955)
- opera "Pirnipuu" (1973)
