= Kristjan Kõrver =

Estonian composer (born 1976)

- Born: October 1, 1976 (age 49); Tallinn, then part of Estonian SSR, Soviet Union
- Education: Georg Ots Tallinn Music School; Estonian Academy of Music and Theatre
- Occupation: Composer
- Known for: Contemporary classical music, chamber opera
- Awards: Composer Prize – Estonian Music Days (2003, 2007); Annual Award – Cultural Endowment of Estonia (2013)

Kristjan Kõrver (born 1 October 1976, in Tallinn) is an Estonian composer.

In 1997, Kristjan Kõrver graduated in music theory from the Georg Ots Tallinn Music School where he also studied composition with Alo Põldmäe.

His music has been performed in various ensembles such as the Tallinn Chamber Orchestra, as well as by conductors Risto Joost and Lauri Sirp, mezzo soprano Iris Oja, Estonian zither (kannel) player Kristi Mühling, flutist Tarmo Johannes, cellist Leho Karin, Ensemble Resonabilis, pianists Kai Ratassepp and Irina Zahharenkova, Quartet SaxEst and many others.

He studied composition at the Estonian Academy of Music and Theatre, graduating in 2003.

Since 2003, has been a member of Estonian Composers' Union.

== Awards ==
- Composer Prize at the Estonian Music Days Festival 2003
- Composer Prize at the Estonian Music Days Festival 2007
- 2013 Annual Award of the Endowment for Music of Cultural Endowment of Estonia

== Works ==
Year	Title	Type	Instrumentation / Notes
2003	Expansio I	Chamber music	For four alto saxophones
2007	Gratis dictum	Ensemble work	For instrumental ensemble
2009	Symphonism 12	Orchestral work	For symphony orchestra
2013	The Iron-Ants (Raud-Ants)	Chamber opera	Opera for small ensemble and voices
2016	Schizzo concertato	Orchestral work	For string orchestra
