= Estonian Music Days =

Music festival in Estonia

Estonian Music Days (Estonian: Eesti muusika päevad) is a music festival which focuses on Estonian contemporary music. Since 1993 the festival take place annually and in spring. The festival is organized by Estonian Composers' Union in collaboration with Estonian Music Information Centre (:et) and with other institutions.

First festival took place in 1979 in Tallinn under the auspices of Estonian Composers' Union. First festival lasted 10 days and during the festival, 18 concerts, 8 theatrical performances, press conference were presented.

In 1981 the festival was organized as Tallinn Music Days.

Since 1991, the festival bears the name of Estonian Music Days and is organised annually in springs since 1993.

Artistic directors:

- Raimo Kangro
- Mare Põldmäe
- 2002-2005 Timo Steiner
- 2005-2014 Timo Steiner and Ülo Krigul
- since 2015 Helena Tulve.
