= Uno Naissoo =

Estonian composer and jazz musician

- Born: 25 March 1928; Viljandi, Estonia
- Died: 5 January 1980 (aged 51) Tallinn, then part of Estonian SSR, Soviet Union
- Genres: Jazz
- Occupations: Composer, musician

Uno Naissoo (born 25 March 1928, Viljandi – 5 January 1980, Tallinn) was an Estonian composer and jazz musician.

In 1952, he graduated from Tallinn State Conservatory. Naissoo then taught music theory subjects at Georg Ots Tallinn Music School from 1952 to 1980.

He has also directed several ensembles, including Swing Club (1947–1957), Rütmikud (1948–1950). Naissoo Unn has been a member of Estonian Composers' Union since 1954.

His son is pianist and composer Tõnu Naissoo.

== Awards ==
- 1965 Estonian SSR Merited Art Worker
- 1976 Annual Music Award of Estonian SSR
- 1978 Estonian SSR People's Artist

== Selected works ==
Context & Composition Insight

Uno Naissoo was a pioneering figure in post-war Estonian jazz, known for blending classical structure with improvisational elements. His compositions often integrated Estonian folk motifs with Western swing rhythms. Several of his jazz suites and choral works became staples in the Soviet-era Baltic repertoire, performed by school ensembles and national symphonies alike.

- 7 jazz suites
- song "My Home"
- song "When It’s Midsummer Day"
- song "The May Began in March"
- choral song “The Woodpecker’s Warning” (original "Metsa telegramm")
