= Ülo Krigul =

Estonian composer (born 1978)

- Born: 7 November 1978 (age 47); Tallinn, Estonia
- Education: Estonian Academy of Music and Theatre
- Occupations: Musician; composer
- Years active: 1990s–present
- Family: Vambola Krigul (brother)
- Musical career
- Genres: Rock; jazz
- Instrument: Keyboard

Ülo Krigul (born 7 November 1978 in Tallinn) is an Estonian composer.

In 1997, he graduated from Tallinn Music High School. In 2006, he graduated from the Estonian Academy of Music and Theatre, specialising in composition.

He has been a music organizer; from 1995 to 1999, he belonged to the staff of the Jazzkaar festival. From 2005 to 2014, he was one of the artistic directors of the Estonian Music Days festival.

He has also been a member (as keyboard player or arranger) of several rock and jazz ensembles, such as Compromise Blue and Contus Firmus.

Since 2003, he has been a member of the Estonian Composers' Union.

Krigul's younger brother is the classical musician Vambola Krigul.
