= Hillar Kareva =

Estonian composer (1931–1992)

Hillar Kareva (8 December 1931 Tallinn – 17 June 1992 Tallinn) was an Estonian composer.

In 1956, he graduated from Tallinn State Conservatory in composition speciality.

From 1966–1982, he taught music theory at Tallinn State Conservatory.

Since 1959, he was a member of Estonian Composers' Union.

His daughter is poet Doris Kareva.

== Works ==
- Sonate nr. 1 for altsaxophone and piano op. 19
- Sonate nr. 2 for altsaxophone and piano op. 29 nr. 2
- Sonate nr. 3 for altsaxophone and piano op. 30
- Elegy for altsaxophone and piano
