= Tõnu Naissoo =

Estonian composer and jazz pianist

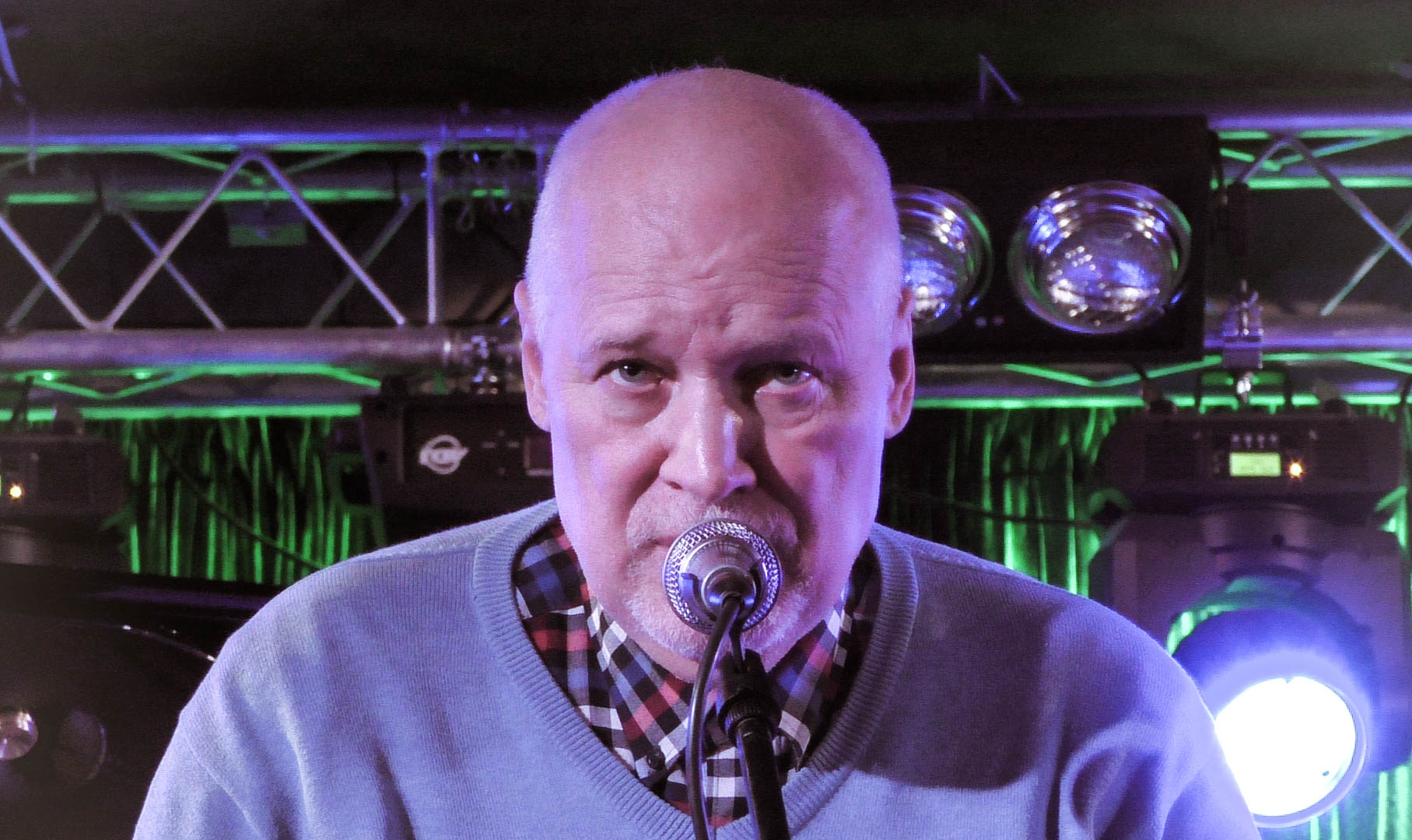
Tõnu Naissoo in 2017

Tõnu Naissoo (born 18 March 1951) is an Estonian composer and jazz pianist.

Naissoo Tõnn was born in Tallinn. He is the son of composer Uno Naissoo. He began studying classical piano at the age of six at the Tallinn Music School, graduating in 1970 with a degree in music theory. In 1982 he graduated from the Tallinn State Conservatory in composition under instruction from Eino Tamberg.

He has played on several musical groups, including Tõnu Naissoo Trio, Optimistid (1967–1968), Collage (1967–1972), Sinilind (1971–1972), Laine (1972–1976), Synthesis (1977–1980), Kaseke (1980–1981). About 30 years he has been a pianist in the Viru Hotel.

He has written music for films and theatrical stages.

Awards:

- 1991: Estonian Radio's Musician of the Year
- 2011: Music Prize of the Estonian Music Council
- 2020: Order of the White Star, V class.
