= Vambola Krigul =

Estonian musician and singer

Vambola Krigul (born 12 April 1981 in Tallinn) is an Estonian percussionist, chamber musician and singer.

Krigul studied flute, percussion instruments, clarinet and saxophone at the Nõmme Music School. After graduating from the Tallinn Music High School in 1999 he continued in percussion classes Estonian Academy of Music and Theatre, where he graduated from in 2004 with a bachelor's degree and in 2006 in master's degree.

In 2000, he reached to the final in Eurovision Young Musicians. The same year, he founded the percussion ensemble PaukenfEST. He is a member of chamber choir Voces Musicales, and he is a bass singer of sacral music ensemble Heinavanker.

Krigul has performed with Estonian National Symphony Orchestra since 2000, as well as the Symphony Orchestra of Estonian National Opera since 2002. From 2002 until 2006 he was a teacher at the Nõmme Music School, and has conducted master classes in Põltsamaa and Võru summer courses for young wind instrument and percussion players.

Krigul's older brother is composer Ülo Krigul.
