= Ester Mägi =

Estonian composer (1922–2021)

Ester Mägi (10 January 1922 – 14 May 2021) was an Estonian composer. She has been called the "first lady of Estonian music."

== Education ==
She trained under Mart Saar at the Tallinn Conservatoire, then from 1951 to 1954 at the Moscow Conservatory under Vissarion Shebalin.

== Career ==
Her compositional output ranged from chamber and vocal music to choral and symphonic works. Amongst her best-known works are her Piano Sonata (1949); Piano Trio in F minor (1950); Piano Concerto (1953); Violin Concerto (1958); Symphony (1968); Variations for Piano, Clarinet and Chamber Orchestra (1972); Bukoolika for orchestra (1983); and Vesper for violin and piano or organ (1990, arranged for strings in 1998). Much of her work was inspired by Estonian folk music.

She taught music theory at the Tallinn Conservatoire until her retirement in 1984.

In 1999 she was awarded an honorary doctorate by the Estonian Academy of Music.

== Death ==
Mägi died in May 2021 at the age of 99.
