= Malle Maltis =

Estonian composer (born 1977)

Malle Maltis (born 11 March 1977 in Tallinn) is an Estonian composer. She currently teaches composition and electronic music at the Estonian Academy of Music and Theatre and has been a music director at the Estonian Drama Theatre since 2013. She is also a member of the Estonian Composers' Union.

== Education ==
Maltis began her musical studies with playing recorder and oboe. In 1999, she studied composition at the Estonian Academy of Music and Theatre. In 2003, she studied at the Hogeschool voor de Kunsten Utrecht in Utrecht, Netherlands. In 2005-2006 she studied at the Conservatorio Giuseppe Tartini in Trieste, Italy. Finally, in 2007-2008, she studied at both the Sibelius Academy in Helsinki, Finland and the Catalonia College of Music in Barcelona, Spain.

== Career ==
Mattis has written and composed a wide array of works, such as chamber ensembles, chamber orchestra, solo instruments, electro-acoustic compositions and film music. Her work has been performed in Estonia and across Europe, including various festivals, such as Gaudeamus Music Week in Amsterdam, Avantgarde-Tirol Festival, and Festival Sounds New in Canterbury. Her current teaching focuses on the symbiosis of electronic and acoustic music; acoustic music inspired by electronic music and vice versa; esthetics of acoustic sound world used in electronic works; and works for solo instruments and ensembles, electro-acoustic and film music.

== Awards ==
- 2004: 1st prize Musica Nova at the International Electroacoustic Music Competition in Prague
- 2005: Composter's Prize at the Estonian Music Days Festival
- 2007: Composter's Prize at the Estonian Music Days Festival
- 2010: 3rd place ECPNM contest for live-electronic music works
- 2010: 3rd place European Conference of Promoters of New Music (ECPNM) contest
