= Margo Kõlar =

Estonian composer (born 1961)

Margo Kõlar (born 2 October 1961 in Tartu) is an Estonian composer.

In 2006 he finished his doctoral studies at Estonian Academy of Music and Theatre.

1986-1993 he worked as a sound engineer at Estonian Radio. 1987-1993 he was a music director of Estonian State Puppet Theater. 1997-2001 he was a composition teacher at Heino Eller Tartu Music School. From 1999 he is a lecturer (since 2015 professor) and director of the electronic music studio of the Estonian Academy of Music and Theatre.

In 1996 he founded the vocal ensemble Heinavanker.

Since 1987 he is member of the Estonian Composers' Union. Since 1999 he is a member of the Association of Estonian Professional Musicians.
