= Lauri Jõeleht =

Estonian composer (born 1974)

Lauri Jõeleht (born 14 December 1974 in Tallinn) is an Estonian composer.

In 2003, he finished his master's thesis in composition speciality at Estonian Academy of Music and Theatre.

Since 1996, he has been working as a guitar teacher. Since 2014, he has also been teaching at the Institute of Instrumental and Vocal Pedagogy of the Estonian Academy of Music and Theatre.

Since 2002, he is a member of Estonian Composers' Union.

== Works ==
works for solo instrument(s) and orchestra

- "Concerto for Accordion and Chamber Orchestra"
- "A Mystical Hymn of the Medieval"
- "Horizon"
