= Jazzkaar =

Estonian music festival

Jazzkaar (Estonian: Jazzkaar) is an Estonian music festival which focuses on jazz music. This festival is the biggest jazz festival in Baltic states.

First festival took place in 1990.

In general, the festival lasts 10 days. Since 1990 about 3000 foreign artists from about 60 countries have participated. Past performers have included Gregory Porter, Pat Metheny and Jan Garbarek.

In spring 2017, the festival was visited by about 25,000 people. To date, this is an all-time record for this festival, which is the best-attended festival in Estonia.
