= Edgar Arro =

Estonian composer

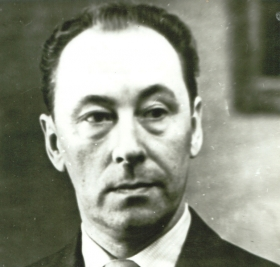
Edgar Arro

Edgar Arro (24 March 1911 – 24 December 1978) was a renowned Estonian composer and organist. Born in Tallinn, he studied organ under August Topman, completing his degree in 1935, and composition with Artur Kapp, graduating in 1939 from the Tallinn Conservatory. Arro was employed as an organist at the Estonian Broadcasting Corporation (1936–1940) and at Tallinn’s Kaarli Congregation (1940–1941).

During WW II, he was mobilised to the rear area in the Soviet Union. During the war times, he assumed the work of the State Artistic Ensembles of the Estonian SSR.

Since 1944, he was a member of Estonian Composers' Union.

From 1944 to 1952 he taught at Tallinn Music School. From 1944 to 1978, he taught music theory at Tallinn State Conservatory.

Best known for his small-scale works, Arro composed extensively for organ, piano, chamber ensembles, choirs, and solo voice. His musical style was shaped by national romanticism and Estonian folk influences. Some of his most noted compositions include the operetta "Rummu Jüri" (1954) and, with Leo Normet, the operetta "Tuled kodusadamas" (1958). His popular songs and organ works gained substantial recognition at home and abroad.

== Works ==
- 1954: operetta "Rummu Jüri"
- 1958: operetta "Light in the Home Port" (composed in cooperation with Leo Normet)
