= Erkki-Sven Tüür =

Estonian composer

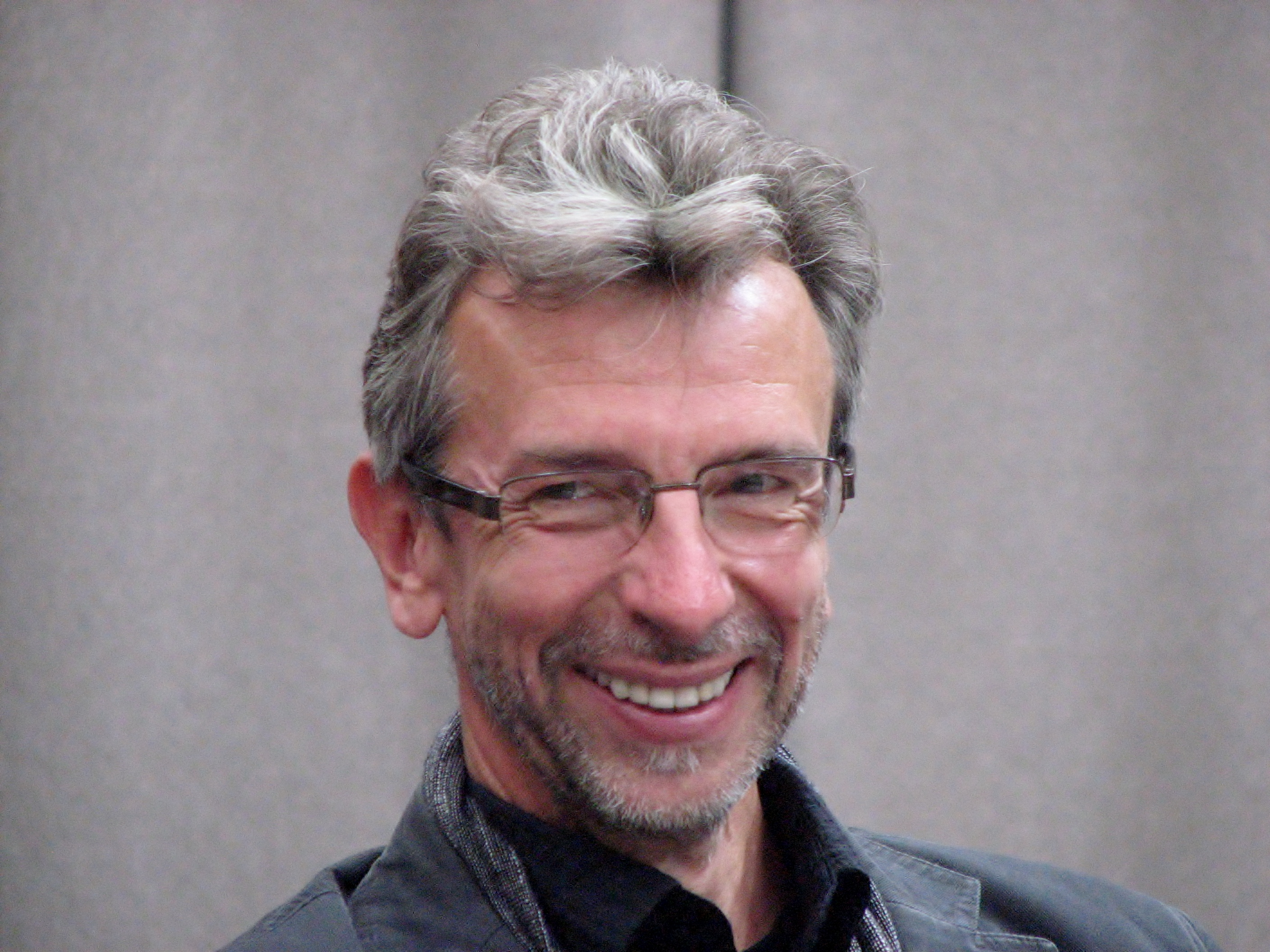
- Tüür in 2013
- Born: 16 October 1959 (age 66); Kärdla, Hiiu County, then part of Estonian SSR, Soviet Union
- Education: Tallinn Music School, Estonian Academy of Music
- Occupation: Composer
- Years active: 1979–present
- Organizations: Estonian Academy of Music
- Notable work: Lighthouse, Insula Deserta, Requiem
- Style: Rock, Contemporary
- Website: www.erkkisven.com

Erkki-Sven Tüür (Estonian pronunciation: [tyːr]; born 16 October 1959) is an Estonian composer.

== Life and career ==
Tüür was born in Kärdla on the Estonian island of Hiiumaa. He studied flute and percussion at the Tallinn Music School from 1976 to 1980 and composition with Jaan Rääts at the Tallinn Academy of Music and privately with Lepo Sumera from 1980 to 1984. From 1979 to 1984 he headed the rock group In Spe, which quickly became one of the most popular in Estonia.

Tüür left In Spe to concentrate on composition, and with the advent of perestroika soon found an audience in the west. The Helsinki Philharmonic, the Hilliard Ensemble, the Stockholm Saxophone Quartet and the City of Birmingham Symphony Orchestra are among those who have commissioned works from him.

His Concerto for Viola and Orchestra, entitled '"Illuminatio"', was premiered by violist Lars Anders Tomter and South Jutland Symphony Orchestra in October 2008.

Since 1985, Tüür is member of the Estonian Composers' Union.

== Style ==
Tüür's early work is polystylistic. Influencing styles were Rock, Post-Romantic, Minimalism, Gregorian Chant.

His music is characterized by expressive, energetic, organic amalgamation of opposite styles: tonality vs. atonality; repetitive rhythm vs. complex rhythm; meditation vs. explosive power; intellectual vs. emotional. The first pure example is his opus Oxymoron.

Tüür has developed a vector-based voice leading technique. The vectors are sequences of intervals, expressed as numbers. He compares this compositional method with a source code, a germ that grows, or a gene that mutates.

Starting point of the composition process is an abstract drawing, that visualizes the music.

=== Tonal ===
- Triad
- Linear Polyphony
- Modality

=== Atonal ===
- Twelve-tone technique
- Tone cluster
- Microtone

== Awards ==
Tüür received numerous national awards.

He was awarded the Cultural Prize of Estonia in 1991 and 1996 and the Baltic Assembly Prize for Literature, the Arts and Science in 1998.

- 2015 Prize of the Christoph and Stephan Kaske Foundation

== Works ==
Tüür's works are published by Edition Peters and Fennica Gehrman.

=== Stage ===
- Wallenberg, Opera in 2 acts (2001); libretto by Lutz Hübner

=== Symphonies ===
- Symphony No. 1 (1984)
- Symphony No. 2 (1987)
- Symphony No. 3 (1997)
- Symphony No. 4 Magma in one movement for solo percussion and orchestra (2002) (also see under Concertante)
- Symphony No. 5 for electric guitar, orchestra and big band (2004)
- Symphony No. 6 Strata in one movement (2007)
- Symphony No. 7 Pietas for mixed chorus and orchestra (2009)
- Symphony No. 8 (2010)
- Symphony No. 9 Mythos (2017)
- Symphony No. 10 Æris in one movement for horn quartet and orchestra (2020)

=== Orchestral ===
- Insula Deserta for string orchestra (1989)
- Searching for Roots (Hommage a Sibelius) (1990)
- Zeitraum (1992)
- Architectonics VI for chamber orchestra (1992) (also see under Architectonics)
- Show (Action – Passion – Illusion) for string orchestra (1993)

1. Action
2. Passion
3. Illusion

- Crystallisatio for chamber orchestra (1995)
- Lighthouse for string orchestra (1997)
- Exodus (1999)
- Aditus: In memoriam Lepo Sumera (2001–2002)
- Aqua for string orchestra (2003)
- Rada ja jäljed (The Path and the Traces) for string orchestra (2005)
- Flamma for string orchestra (2011)
- De Profundis for orchestra (2013)
- Le poids des vies non vécues for orchestra (2013)
- Tormiloits / Incantation of Tempest for orchestra (2014)
- L'ombra della croce (Dedicated to Manfred Eicher) for string orchestra (2014)
- Sow the Wind... for orchestra (2015)
- Phantasma for orchestra (2018)

=== Concertante ===
- Concerto for cello and orchestra (1996)
- Concerto for violin and orchestra (1999)
- Concerto for marimba and orchestra Ardor (2001)
- Magma, Symphony No. 4 in one movement for solo percussion and orchestra (2002)
- Concerto for bassoon and orchestra (2003)
- Concerto for violin, clarinet and orchestra Noesis (2005)
- Concerto for piano and orchestra (2006)
- Whistles and Whispers from Uluru for recorder and string orchestra (2007)
- Prophecy for accordion and orchestra (2007)
- Concerto for viola and orchestra Illuminatio (2008)
- Concerto for clarinet and orchestra Peregrinus Ecstaticus (2013)
- Solastalgia for piccolo flute and orchestra (2016)
- Concerto for violin and orchestra No. 2 Angel's Share (2017)
- Concerto for violin and orchestra No. 3 Kõnelused Tundmatuga (Conversations with the Unknown) (2019–2020)
- Concerto for cello and orchestra No. 2 Labyrinths of Life (2023)
- Concerto for oboe and orchestra Desert Wind

=== Architectonics ===
- Architectonics I for woodwind quintet (1984)
- Architectonics II for clarinet, cello and piano (1986)
- Architectonics III "Postmetaminimal Dream" for flute, alto flute, clarinet, bass clarinet, 2 pianos, synthesizer, percussion (2 players), violin and cello (1990)
- Architectonics IV "Per Cadenza ad Metasimplicity" for violin (or electric violin), bassoon, baritone saxophone and piano (or synthesizer) (1990)
- Architectonics V for electric guitar and amplified piano (1991)
- Architectonics VI for chamber orchestra (1992)
- Architectonics VII for flute, cello and harpsichord (or flute, bass clarinet and piano) (1992)

=== Chamber music ===
- Graafiline leht (Prints) for flute and harp (1985)
- String Quartet "In memoriam Urmas Kibuspuu" (1985)
- Sisemonoloog (Inner Monologue) for flute solo (1986)
- Dedication for cello and piano (1990)
- Dick ja Toff imedemaal (Dick and Toff in Wonderland) for flute and tuba (or bass clarinet) (1991)
- Kaljukitse märgi all (The Tropic of Capricorn) for flute, clarinet, vibraphone, violin, electric guitar (2nd electric guitar ad libitum) and MIDI electronics (1991)
- Miraaž (Mirage) for electronics (1991)
- Spiel for cello and guitar (1992)
- Drama for flute (or vibraphone), violin and guitar (1994)
- Spectrum II for organ, trumpet and percussion ad libitum (1994)
- Conversio for violin and piano (1994)
- Lamentatio for 4 saxophones (1995)
- Mängu võlu (The Glamour of the Game) for double bass, live electronics and MIDI percussion (1995)
- Symbiosis for violin and double bass (1996)
- Motus I for percussion (1998)
- Motus II for percussion (4 players) (1998)
- Fata Morgana for violin, cello and piano (2002)
- Sisemonoloog II (Inner Monologue II) for flute and electronics
- Oxymoron (Music for Tirol) for chamber ensemble and live electronics (2003)
- Spectrum IV for cello and organ (2004)
- Confession for violin solo (2007)
- Synergie for violin and cello (2010)
- String Quartet No. 2 "Lost Prayers" (2012)

=== Organ ===
- Spectrum I (1989)
- Spectrum III (1999)

=== Piano ===
- Kristiinale (To Kristiina) (1981, 1995)
- Sonatina for 2 pianos (1984)
- Piano Sonata (1985)
- Mõeldes Hiiumaast (Hiiumaa; Souvenir of Hiiumaa) (1992)
- Ülekanne (Transmission) for 6 pianos (1996)
- Short Meeting of Dark and Light (2003)
- Mida nägin mäetipule jõudes (What I Saw from the Top of the Mountain), Music for Children (2003)

=== Vocal ===
- Excitatio ad Contemplandum for alto, 2 tenors, baritone (or mixed chorus) and organ (1996)
- Questions... for countertenor, 2 tenors, baritone and string orchestra (2007)

=== Choral ===
- Raerituaal (Town Council Custom) for mixed chorus, early music ensemble, electric guitar and chamber orchestra (1982–2004)
- Ante Finem Saeculi, Oratorio for soprano, tenor, bass, mixed chorus and orchestra (1985); Biblical text and words by Viivi Luik
- Lumen et Cantus, Mass for male chorus and orchestra (1989)
- Inquiétude du Fini for male chorus and chamber orchestra (1992); words by Tõnu Õnnepalu
- Psalmody for mixed chorus and early music ensemble (1993, 2005); Biblical text
- Requiem "In memoriam Peeter Lilje" for soprano, tenor, mixed chorus and chamber orchestra (1994)
- Rändaja õhtulaul (The Wanderer's Evening Song) for mixed chorus a cappella (2001)
- Meditatio for mixed chorus and saxophone quartet (2003)
- Salve Regina for male chorus and orchestra (2005)
- Igavik (Eternity) for male chorus and chamber orchestra (2006); words by Doris Kareva
- Questions... for countertenor, tenor, baritone, mixed choir and string orchestra (2007)
- Triglosson trishagion for mixed chorus a cappella (2008)
- Väike eestimaine laul (Little Estonian Song) for children's chorus (2009)
- Ärkamine (Awakening) for mixed choir and orchestra (2011)
- Missa brevis for mixed choir (2014)

=== Film scores ===
- Elu ilma Gabriella Ferrita (Life without Gabriella Ferri) (2008)

== Discography ==
- Symphony No. 9 Mythos; Incantation of Tempest; Sow the Wind...; Estonian Festival Orchestra, Paavo Järvi
- Symphony No. 8 Illumination; Whistles and Whispers from Uluru, Lawrence Power, viola; Genevieve Lacey, recorders; Tapiola Sinfonietta, Olari Elts
- Peregrinus ecstaticus; Les poids de vies non vecues; Noesis. Christoffer Sundqvist, clarinet; Pekka Kuusisto, violin; Finnish Radio Symphony Orchestra, Hannu Lintu
- Symphony No. 7 Pietas; Piano Concerto, Laura Mikkola; Frankfurt Radio Symphony Orchestra, Paavo Järvi
- Symphony No. 6 Strata; Noēsis, Nordic Symphony Orchestra, Anu Tali
- Symphony No. 5; Prophecy for Accordion and Orchestra, Mika Vayrynen; Helsinki Philharmonic Orchestra, Olari Elts
- Symphony No. 4 Magma, Dame Evelyn Glennie, percussion; Estonian Philharmonic Chamber Choir, Estonian National Male Choir, Estonian National Symphony Orchestra, Paavo Järvi
- Architectonics VI; Passion; Illusion; Crystallisatio; Requiem. Kaja Urb, soprano; Tiit Kogermann, tenor; Tõnu Kaljuste/Estonian Philharmonic Chamber Choir, Tallinn Chamber Orchestra
- Symphony No. 3; Concerto (cello); Lighthouse. David Geringas, cello; Dennis Russell Davies/Radio Symphonieorchester Wien
- In the Memory of Clear Water. American Wind Symphony Orchestra
- Insula deserta; Searching for Roots (Hommage à Sibelius); Zeitraum. Juha Kangas, Ostrobothnian Chamber Orchestra, Paavo Järvi, Royal Stockholm Philharmonic
- Lighthouse. Juha Kangas/Ostrobothnian Chamber Orchestra (Finlandia: 3964-29718)
- Spiel. Boris Björn Bagger, guitar; Martin Ostertag, cello
- Symphony No. 2. Paul Mägi/USSR Ministry of Culture State Symphony Orchestra
- Oratorium: Ante Finem Saeculi. Tõnu Kaljuste/Estonian Philharmonic Chamber Choir, Estonian Opera-Theatre Orchestra
- Sonata. Kalle Randalu, piano
- Architectonics I-VII; Spectrum II. NYYD Ensemble
- Architectonics I-VII. Absolute Ensemble
- Motus II. Cabaza Percussion Quartet
- Spectrum I. Andres Uibo, organ
- Spectrum II. Jüri Leiten, trumpet; Andres Uibo, organ; M. Metsamart, percussion
- String Quartet. Tallinn Quartet
- String Quartet. Duke Quartet
- String Quartet No. 2 "Lost Prayers" (2012). Armida Quartett (Music for Strings)
