= List of Estonian choirs =

There are over 700 choirs in Estonia, a country of only 1.4 million people. The following is a list of some of the notable choirs.

Name	Type of choir	Location (city/town)	Further info
Estonian Philharmonic Chamber Choir	mixed	Tallinn	Professional choir. Conductor: Paul Hilliard
Estonian National Male Choir	male	Tallinn	Professional choir. Conductor: Mikk Üleoja
Mixed Choir of Estonia Society	mixed		conductor: Heli Jürgenson
Tallinn Old Town Mixed Choir	mixed	Tallinn	conductors: Lauri Aav and Tuuli Metsoja

== College choirs ==
- Chamber Choir of Tallinn Technical University (Tallinna Tehnikaülikooli Kammerkoor) - conductor: Rihards Zarins
- Tallinn Music High School Chamber Choir (Tallinna Muusikakeskkooli Kammerkoor) - conductor: Evi Eespere
- Academic Male Choir of Tallinn Technical University (Tehnikalikooli Akadeemilise Meeskoori) - conductor: Peeter Perens
- Tallinn University Academic Male Choir (Tallinna Ülikooli Akadeemiline Meeskoor) - conductors: Jüri Rent and Indrek Vijard
- Tartu Academic Male Choir (Tartu Akadeemilne Meeskoor)
- Mixed Choir of Tartu Teacher Training College (Tartu Õpetajate Seminari Segakoor)
- Tartu University Women's Choir (Tartu Ülikooli Akadeemiline Naiskoor) - conductor: Triin Koch

== Church choirs ==
- St. Charles Church Concert and Chamber Choir (Tallinn Kaarli Kiriku Koork) - conductor: Heli Jürgenson

== Male choirs ==
- Estonian National Male Choir - conductor: Mikk Üleoja
- Estonian United Boys Choir and Revalia Male Chamber Choir - conductor: Hirvo Surva
- Tallinn Boys Choir (Tallinna Poistekoor) - conductor: Lydia Rahula
- Tartu Boys Choir (Tartu Poistekoor)

== Women's choirs ==
- Tartu University Female Choir - conductor: Triin Koch
- Estonian TV Girls' Choir and Children's Choir - conductor: Aarne Saluveer
- Estonian Academy of Music Female Choir - conductor: Ene Kangrun
- Ellerhein Girls' Choir - conductor: Ingrid Kõrvits
- Emajõe Laulikud - conductor: Vilve Maide
- EKN - Estonian Choral Conductors' Female Choir - conductor: Ants Sööt
- Estonian National Girls' Choir LEELO - conductor: Külli Kiivet

== See also ==
- Estonian Song Festival
