= Ludwig Busbetzky =

Estonian organist and composer

Ludwig Busbetzky (Lovies Busbetsky; Busbet) was an Estonian organist and composer during the 17th century. Coming from a family of musicians, Busbetzky studied with Dieterich Buxtehude in Lübeck around 1680.

From 1687 to 1699 Busbetzky was the organist at the German church in Narva.

Only two of his compositions are known to have survived, both of which were previously attributed to Buxtehude.

- Erbarm dich mein ô Herre Gott for soprano, alto, tenor, bass, 2 violins, 2 violas, bassoon or violone, and continuo.
- Laudate Dominum for soprano, 2 violins, bassoon or violone, and continuo.

== See also ==
- Culture of Estonia
