= Olga Shishkina (musician) =

Russian born gusli and kantele artist (born 1985)

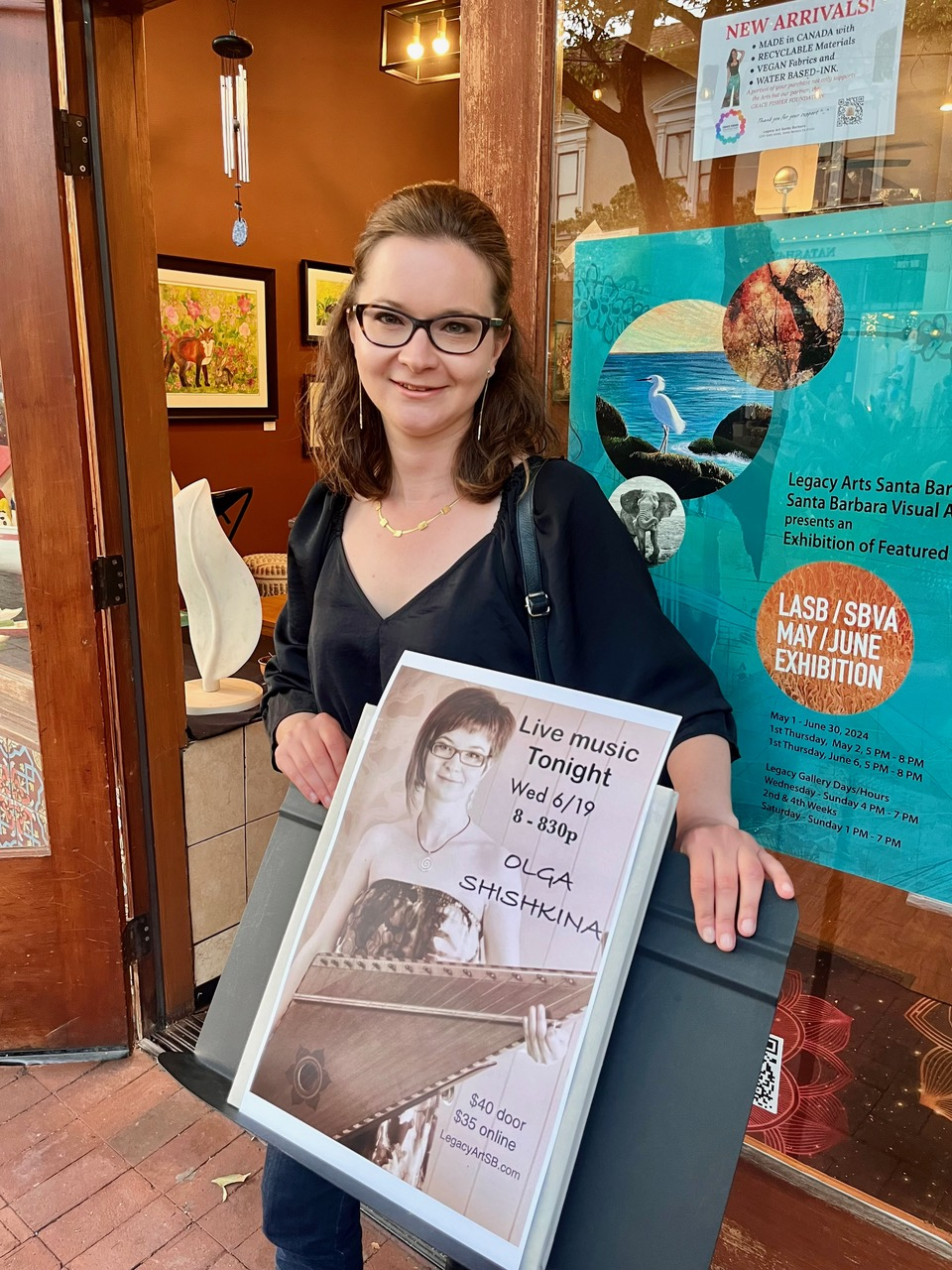
Olga Shishkina

Olga Shishkina (Russian: Ольга Шишкина; born 23 May 1985, Leningrad) is a Russian born gusli and kantele artist currently residing in Helsinki, Finland.

== Education ==
Shishkina started to play gusli at the age of 8. In 1993–2001 she attended Andreev music school where she studied gusli, piano, balalaika and classical guitar. At the age of 16 she got the 2nd prize at 6th All-Russian Competition (2001, Tver) where she became the youngest prize winner in the competition's history. Since then Shishkina has been performing at numerous festivals in Scandinavia, UK, Japan, USA, Switzerland and other countries. In 2003 she was accepted to St.Petersburg Rimsky-Korsakov Conservatory on exceptional basis without compulsory studies at music college. She majored in gusli, but at the same time also studied piano, organ and orchestral conducting. After graduating with the highest honours from the Conservatory she continued her education at Sibelius Academy in Helsinki where she studied Finnish kantele, classical and jazz piano. Shishkina became the first foreigner to have graduated as a Master of Music in Finnish concert kantele in 2012. Since 2014 she has been holding a position of a board member of Kanteleliitto, Finnish kantele association. Shishkina has been a jury member at such competitions as International Kantele competition (Petrozavodsk, 2014) and International Kantele competition (Helsinki, 2015).

== Collaborations ==
Throughout her career Shishkina has been involved in different music genres. Since 2004 she has been playing in a duo with a Russian flutist Alexander Kiskachi where her instrument is a chromatic gusli. Other collaborations include work with such Finnish musicians as Timo Kämäräinen, Mika Mylläri, Terttu Iso-Oja and Saara Aalto and Estonian jazz guitarist Ain Agan. In 2013 she was invited as a special guest to perform at Jazz Harp Festival (Leiden, Netherlands) where she appeared together with a Grammy-nominated jazz harpist Deborah Henson-Conant. In January 2014 Shishkina was involved as both a musician and a composer in a theatre play "Finnphonia Emigrantica" produced by European Theatre Collective. The play was reviewed positively in Helsingin Sanomat. Apart from gusli and kantele, Shishkina also appeared on Chinese guzheng on a few occasions.

== Awards ==
- International Youth Andreev Competition (1996 – 3rd prize, 1998 – 2nd prize, 2000 – 3rd prize, St. Petersburg)
- 6th All-Russian Competition (2001, Tver – 2nd prize)
- First Shalov Competition (2007, St.Petersburg – 1st prize)
- First International Kantele Competition (Helsinki, 2011 – 3rd prize plus special prize from the Society of Finnish Composers for her performance of Jukka Linkola's "Terracotta lady")

== Recordings ==
=== Solo albums ===
- Olga Shishkina. Con Brillio (2010) ERP Estonian record productions

=== Appears also on ===
- Sound of Koli (2011), concert and electric kantele, Koistinen Kantele
- Brazilian Aeroplane "Simetria: Bo Kasper in Brazil" (2010), electric kantele, piano
- Saara Aalto "Angels" (2011), concert kantele
- Pepe Deluxe "Queen of the Wave" (2011), wing-shaped and chromatic gusli
- YLE Finnish broadcasting company TV Documentary production of Kati Juurus' "Kaksi miestä Kiinasta" (2011), guzheng
- Jukka Tiensuu YLE radio recording, Egregore (2012), concert kantele

== Links ==
- http://www.olgashishkina.me
- http://www.erpmusic.com/artists/instrumentalists/olga-shishkina
- http://www.sirp.ee/index.php?option=com_content&view=article&id=12782:mozarti-maeng-ja-monda-&catid=5:muusika&Itemid=12&issue=3353
