= Veljo Tormis =

Estonian composer (1930–2017)

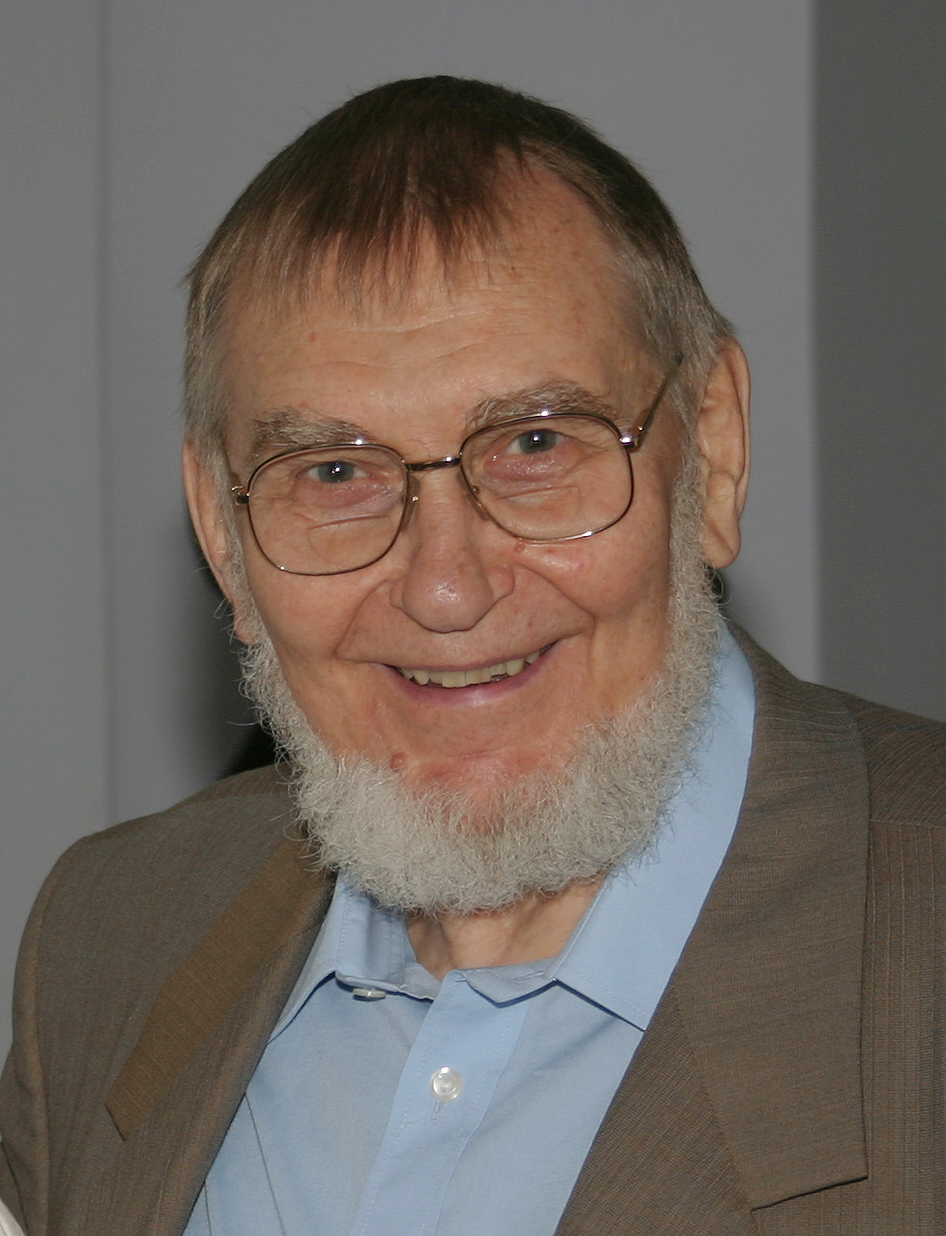
Tormis in 2004

Veljo Tormis (7 August 1930 – 21 January 2017) was an Estonian composer, regarded as one of the great contemporary choral composers and one of the most important composers of the 20th century in Estonia. Internationally, his fame arises chiefly from his extensive body of choral music, which exceeds 500 individual choral songs, most of it a cappella. The great majority of these pieces are based on traditional ancient Estonian folksongs (regilaulud), either textually, melodically, or merely stylistically.

His composition most often performed outside Estonia, Curse Upon Iron (Raua needmine, 1972), invokes ancient Shamanistic traditions to construct an allegory about the evils of war. Some of his works were banned by the Soviet government, but because folk music was fundamental to his style most of his compositions were accepted by the censors.

More recently, Tormis' works have been performed and recorded by Tõnu Kaljuste with the Estonian Philharmonic Chamber Choir, and others. In the 1990s, Tormis began to receive commissions from some a cappella groups as the King's Singers and the Hilliard Ensemble.

Tormis famously said of his settings of traditional melodies and verse: "It is not I who makes use of folk music, it is folk music that makes use of me." His work demonstrates his conviction that traditional Estonian and other Balto-Finnic music represents a treasure which must be guarded and nourished, and that culture may be kept alive through the medium of song.

== Biographical highlights ==
Born in Kuusalu in 1930, Tormis had a profound experience with choral music starting at an early age. His father was a choral director, organist, and music teacher. His delight in the contrasting timbres provided by the organ stops may also be connected to his later orchestration of choral textures, a hallmark of his mature style.

Tormis began his formal musical education in 1943 at the Tallinn Music School, but was interrupted by World War II and illness. In 1949, he entered the Tallinn Conservatory and continued his studies at the Moscow Conservatory (1951–1956). He quickly acquired teaching positions at the Tallinn Music School (1955–60) and the Tallinn Music High School (1962–66), but by 1969 was supporting himself exclusively as a freelance composer. One of his pupils was composer Kuldar Sink.

Tormis was married to theatre scholar, historian, critic and teacher Lea Tormis (née Rummo). They had one son, Tõnu Tormis.

From his student days until his retirement from composition in 2000, Tormis composed over 500 individual choral songs, as well as other vocal and instrumental pieces, 35 film scores, and an opera. Despite the censorship of several of his more politically provocative works in the late 1970s and the 1980s, he remained an incredibly celebrated composer whose works were performed throughout the Soviet Union and Eastern Europe. In Eastern Europe, he is regarded as one of the great contributors to the 20th century repertory of choral music. Dissolution of the Soviet Union in 1991 has allowed increased access to the Soviet censored compositional output. The music of Tormis, along with other composers in the region, is experiencing increased rates of programing and publishing, allowing for increased appreciation of the choral and vocal music traditions.

== Selected works ==
- Kihnu pulmalaulud (Kihnu Island Wedding Songs), 1959
- Overture No. 2, 1959
- Sügismaastikud (Autumn Landscapes), 1964
- Luigelend (opera), 1965
- Eesti kalendrilaulud (Estonian Calendar Songs), 1966–67
- Maarjamaa ballaad (Ballad of Mary's Land), 1967
- Raua needmine (Curse Upon Iron), 1972
- Pikse litaania (Litany To Thunder), 1974
- Eesti ballaadid (Estonian Ballads), 1980
- Laulusild (Bridge of Song), 1981
- Varjele, Jumalan soasta (God, Protect us from War), 1984
- Unustatud rahvad (Forgotten Peoples), 1970–89
- Piispa ja pakana (The Bishop And The Pagan), 1992
- Incantatio maris aestuosi (Incantation for a Stormy Sea), 1996

== See also ==
- Music of Estonia
