= Doris Kareva =

Estonian poet and translator

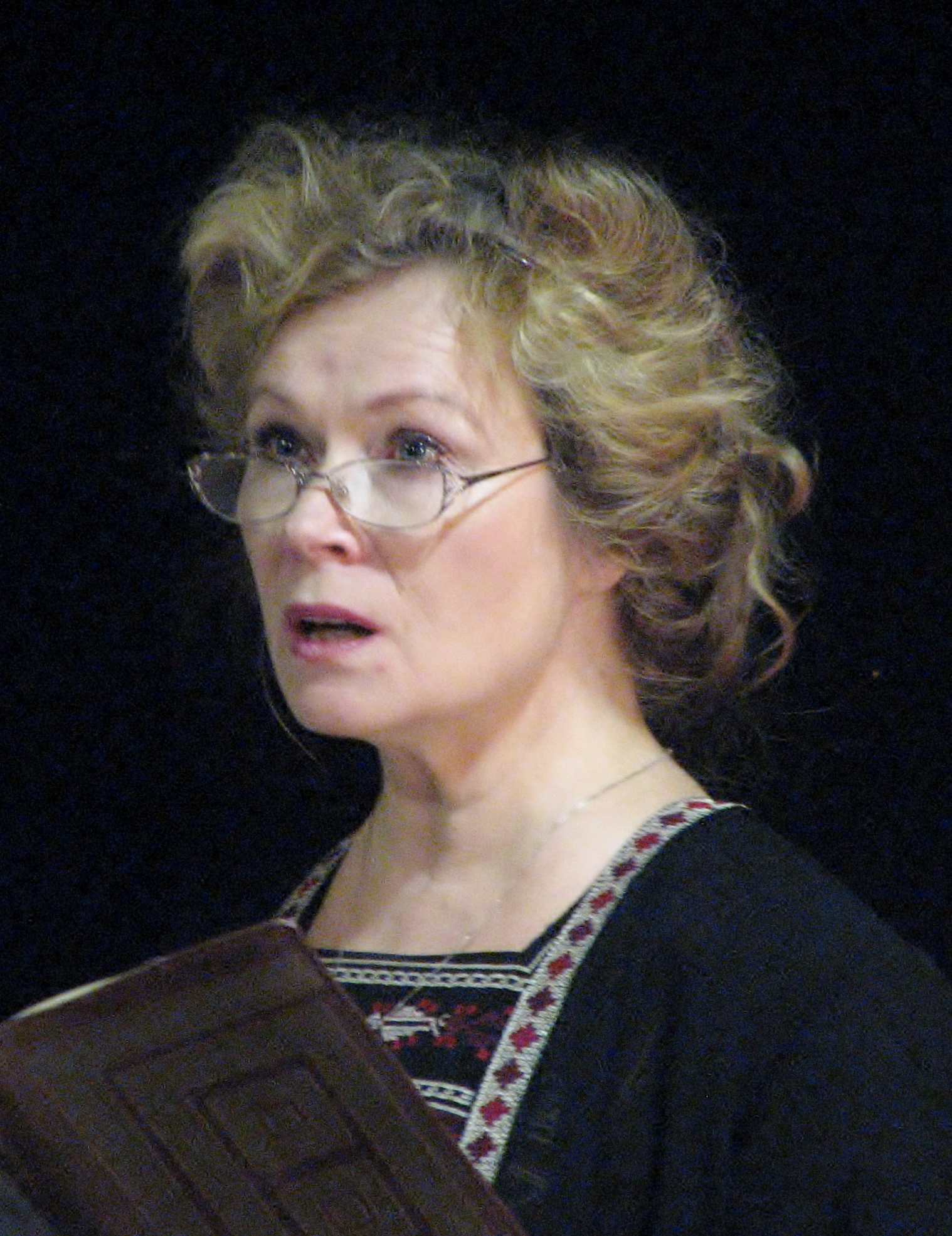
- Kareva at the Dovlatov Festival in Tallinn
- Born: 28 November 1958 (age 67); Tallinn, then part of Estonian SSR, Soviet Union
- Education: University of Tartu
- Occupations: Journalist, poet, editor, translator, writer
- Writing career
- Notable awards: Juhan Liiv Poetry Award (1991)

Doris Kareva (born 28 November 1958) is an Estonian poet and translator. She served as the secretary general of the Estonian National Commission in UNESCO between 1992 and 2008.

== Biography ==
Kareva was born in Tallinn. Her father, Hillar Kareva, was a notable composer. She studied English language and literature at the University of Tartu and started to write poetry in the 1960s. She is a recipient of a number of state awards, including two Estonian State Cultural Awards and the Order of the White Star.

Kareva's poetry was translated to 18 languages as of 2014. She translated to Estonian, among other authors, William Shakespeare, Anna Akhmatova, Emily Dickinson, Joseph Brodsky, Kahlil Gibran, Kabir, W. H. Auden, and Samuel Beckett.

== Selected works ==
Poetry books

- Päevapildid (1978)
- Ööpildid (1980)
- Puudutus (1981)
- Salateadvus (1983)
- Vari ja viiv (1986)
- Armuaeg (1991)
- Kuuhobune (1992)
- Maailma asemel (1992)
- Hingring (1997)
- Mandragora (2002)
- Aja kuju (2005)
- Tähendused (2007)
- Lõige (2007)
- Deka (2008)
- Sa pole üksi (2011)
- Perekonnaalbum (2015)
