= Helena Tulve =

Estonian composer

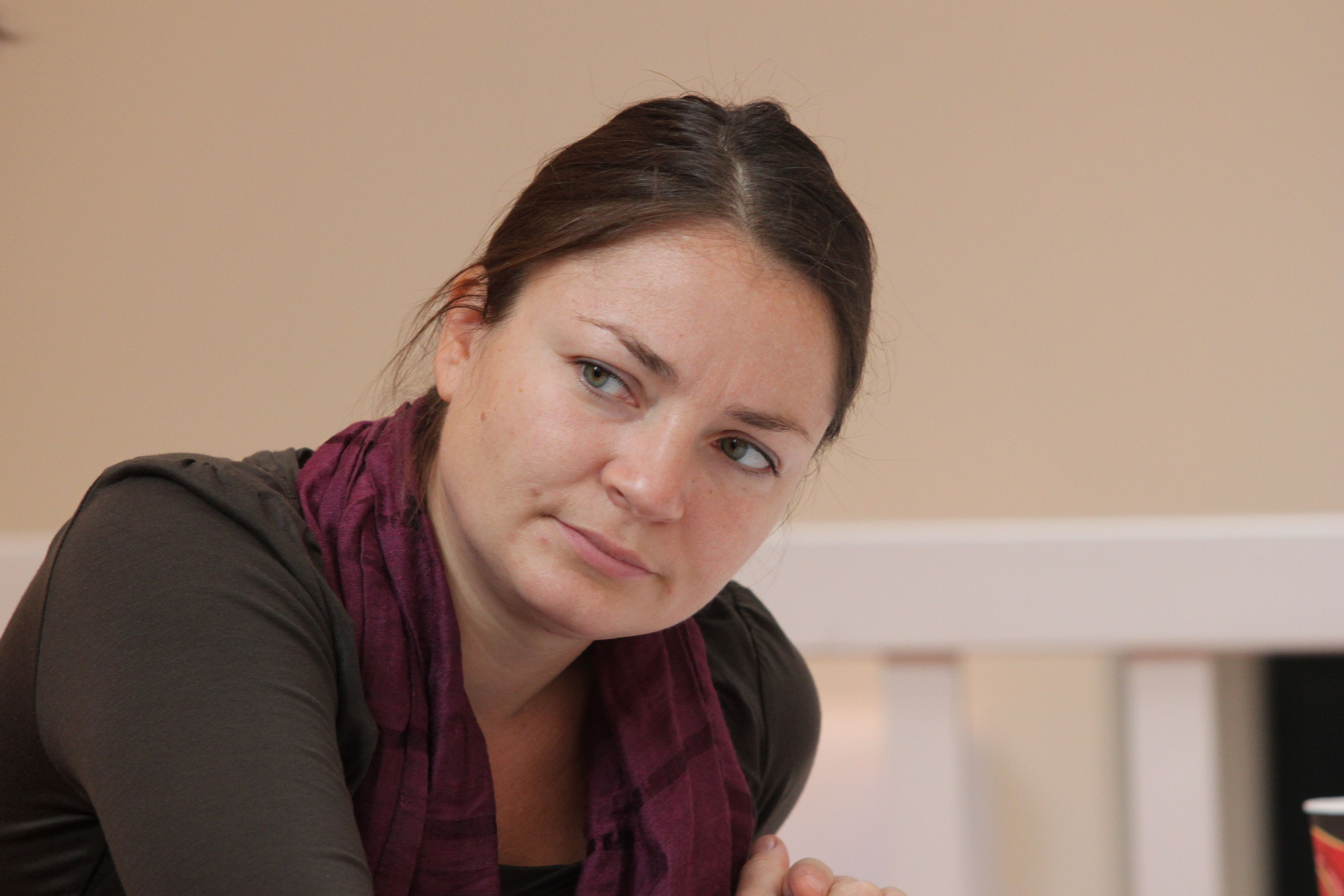
Helena Tulve

Helena Tulve (born 28 April 1972) is an Estonian composer.

Born in Tartu, she studied composition at the Tallinn Secondary Music School under Alo Põldmäe and from 1989 to 1992 at the Estonian Academy of Music with Erkki-Sven Tüür, being the latter's sole student of composition thus far. In 1994 Tulve graduated with the Premier Prix from Jacques Charpentier's composition class at the Conservatoire Superieur de Paris. Between 1993 and 1996 she furthered her knowledge of Gregorian chant. She has also attended György Ligeti’s and Marco Stroppa’s summer courses.

She is married to composer Jaan-Eik Tulve.

== Selected works ==
- Reyah hadas ´ala for male voices and ancient music instruments (2005, text by Shalom Shabazi)
- Lendajad for amplified flutes (2005)

[fl.in C (fl. picc./ fl. basso) & fl. in C (fl. picc./ fl. in G)]

- ligne d´horizon for ensemble (2005)

[ 1-1-1-0/ 0-0-0-0/ pno-arpa-mandolino-guit.-1batt./ 1-1-1-1]

- lumineux/opaque new version for clarinet, cello, piano and 3 wine glasses (2004)
- chamber-opera It Is Getting So Dark (2003/04, text by Sei Shōnagon)

[14 female voices & ensemble: flauto-corno-vla-cb.-arpa-batt.]

- ...il neige for harpsichord and kannel (2004)
- nec ros, nec pluvia... for string quartet (2004)
- effleurements, éclatements... for guitar and percussion (2003)
- abysses for flute and ensemble (2003)

[fl.picc./in C/alto/basso-fl.picc./in C/alto-ob.-fag.- tr.ne-batt.-v.la-vc. ]

- lijnen for soprano and ensemble (2003)

[fl.-cl.-ob.-fag.-corno-vln.-vla- vc.-cb.]

- delta soundscape for tape (2003)
- Vie secrète for chamber choir (2002)
- lumineux / opaque for violin, cello, piano and 3 wine glasses (2002)
- Valvaja for oboe solo (2002)
- Cendres for ensemble (2001)

[fl.-cl.-vln.-vc.-cb.-2 batt.-2 pn.]

- Traces for ensemble (2001)

[fl.-ob.-cl.-sax.bar./sax.alto-batt.-vln.-cb.]

- Vertige for piano (2000)
- Ithaque for female voice, violin

and piano (2000)

- Sula (Thawing) for orchestra (1999, commissioned by the NYYD Festival)

[3-3-3-3/ 4-3-3-0/ 5 batt./ 1 pn./ 1 arpa/ 16-14-12-10-8/ didgeridoo]

- Passage secret for two clarinets (1999)
- Sans titre for harpsichord (1999, commissioned by the NYYD Festival for Jukka Tiensuu)
- Sinine (Blue) for chamber ensemble (1998, commissioned by the NYYD Ensemble)

[ 1-1-1-1/ 1-1-1-0/ 1 batt./ 1pn./ 1-1-1-1-1]

- à travers for chamber ensemble (1998, commissioned by the NYYD Ensemble)

[ 1-1-1-1/ 1-0-1-0/ 1 batt./ 1-1-1-1-1]

- Öö (Night) for saxophone quartet (1997, for Stockholm Saxophone Quartet, premiere at the NYYD Festival '97)
- Sõnajalad (Ferns) for voice and piano with words by Karl Ristikivi (1994)
- Saar (Island) for violin and clarinet (1993)
- Exodus for chamber choir (1992/93)
- Lethe for chamber ensemble (1991, fl., ob., cl., pn., vc.)
- Phainomenon for piano, percussions and tape (1989/90)

== Discography ==
- Lijnen (ECM Records, 2008)
- Arboles lloran por lluvia (ECM, 2014)
- Sula (Eesti Raadio, 2005)
