= Alo Põldmäe =

Estonian composer (born 1945)

Alo Põldmäe (born 22 May 1945 in Tartu) is an Estonian composer.

In 1970, he graduated from the Tallinn State Conservatory.

From 1972 to 1980, he was music editor in film studio Tallinnfilm.

In 2009, he founded Estonian National Piano Museum.

Since 1971, he is a member of Estonian Composers' Union.

Awards:

- 2005: Annual Prize of the Endowment for Music of the Cultural Endowment of Estonia
- 2007: Heino Eller Music Prize

== Works ==
- ballett "Merineitsi" (1974)
- "Concert for Oboe" (1974)
- puppet musical "Verine John" (1980)
- chamber opera "Raeooper" (1986)
