= Lepo Sumera =

Estonian composer (1950–2000)

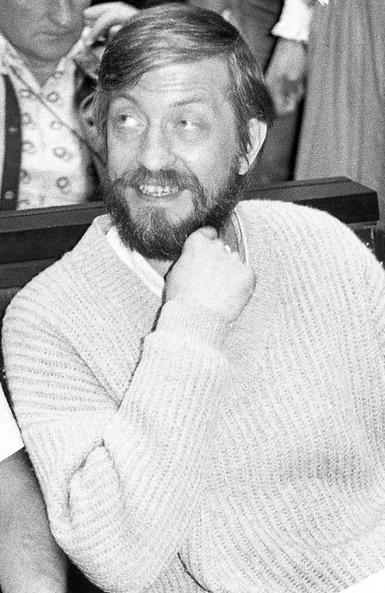
Lepo Sumera in 1988

Lepo Sumera (8 May 1950 – 2 June 2000) was an Estonian composer and teacher.

== Life and career ==
He was born in Tallinn and studied with Veljo Tormis in his teens, and from 1968, with Heino Eller at the Estonian Academy of Music and Theatre (then Tallinn State Conservatory). After Heino Eller's death in 1970, he studied with Heino Jürisalu, graduating in 1973. He then did postgraduate study at the Moscow Conservatory (1979–1982) with the Russian composer Roman Ledenev. Sumera first came to notice in 1972 with In Memoriam, an orchestral tribute to Eller.

Sumera composed six symphonies, most notably Symphony No. 4 from 1992, known also as "Serena Borealis", which includes parts on guitar.

Another noteworthy work is Seenekantaat (Mushroom Cantata), completed in 1983. The chorus text largely consists of the Latinate names of mushroom species.

== Legacy ==
He is considered one of Estonia's most renowned composers along with Heino Eller, Eduard Tubin and Arvo Pärt. He was also his country's Minister of Culture from 1988 to 1992 during the days of the Singing Revolution. As such he was the last Minister of Culture of the Estonian SSR, and the first Minister of Culture after Estonia re-gained independence.

== See also ==
- 20th-century classical music
- Culture of Estonia
