= Ritva Koistinen =

Finnish kantele musician, player

- Born: 1956 (age 68–69)
- Occupation: Lecturer of Kantele Music
- Instrument: Kantele

Ritva Koistinen (born 1956) is a kantele artist and the founder of soloist kantele education at Sibelius Academy (Classical music department). She has been teaching there since 1987, as the Lecturer of Kantele Music from 1995, and during this time she has educated the young generation of Kantele musicians in Finland.

Koistinen started performing already in her childhood, and since the 1980s she has been giving concerts as a soloist both in Finland and abroad, e.g. in the USA, UK, Sweden, Norway, Estonia, Germany, France, Spain, Israel, Canada, and Russia. She has co-operated with several composers and given the first performances of numerous contemporary pieces, among them several chamber music works as well as Kantele Concertos by Pekka Jalkanen and Pehr Henrik Nordgren which she performed with the Ostrobothnian Chamber Orchestra and Sinfonia Lahti. Among the most notable recent collaborations is the one with Kronos Quartet that led to the concerts in Scotland and the USA. In 2010 Ritva Koistinen became the second kantele artist to perform at Carnegie Hall after Ulla Katajavuori.

== Recordings ==
Ritva Koistinen has recorded three solo CDs:

- "The New Finnish Kantele" (1993)
- "From the Eastern Lands" (1998)
- "Hiljaisin Hetkin" (2010)

In 2007, Tamara Bernstein wrote after a concert in Toronto in a review in “globeandmail.com”: “Finland’s Ritva Koistinen gave magical performances of music by Rehnqvist and Pekka Jalkanen on the Finnish Kantele – a small Psaltery that in Koistinen’s hands conjured pure enchantment, from top notes that glittered like cold starlight to bass notes that throbbed with the pulse of an ancient forest.”
