= Estonian Composers' Union =

Organization based in Estonia

Estonian Composers' Union (abbreviation ECU; Estonian: Eesti Heliloojate Liit) is an Estonian creative union which encompasses professional composers and musicologists in Estonia. The chairman of ECU is Märt-Matis Lill.

Since 2005, ECU is a member of the International Society of Contemporary Music (ISCM).

As of 2021, ECU has 120 members.

== History ==
The predecessor of ECU was Estonian Academical Society of Sound Artists which was founded on 19 November 1924. In 1940 the ECU predecessor was liquidated. During Soviet Estonia, similar organization was Association of Vocational Sound Artists which later was re-organized into Estonian SSR Composers' Union. In 1989, Estonian SSR Composers' Union was renamed to Estonian Composers' Union.
