= List of compositions for viola: I to K =

This article lists compositions written for the viola. The list includes works in which the viola is a featured instrument: viola solo, viola and piano, viola and orchestra, ensemble of violas, etc. Catalogue number, date of composition and publisher (for copyrighted works) are also included. Ordering is by composer surname.

This pages lists composers whose surname falls into the I to K alphabetic range. For others, see respective pages:

- List of compositions for viola: A to B
- List of compositions for viola: C to E
- List of compositions for viola: F to H
- List of compositions for viola: L to N
- List of compositions for viola: O to R
- List of compositions for viola: S
- List of compositions for viola: T to Z

== I ==
- Anthony Iannaccone (b. 1943)

Remembrance for viola and piano (1968); Tritone Press
Sonata for viola and piano (1961)

- Jacques Ibert (1890–1962)

Aria for viola and piano (1930); original for voice and piano, published in various versions; transcription by Paul-Louis Neuberth; Éditions Alphonse Leduc
Le petit âne blanc (The Little White Donkey) for viola and piano; original for piano; transcription by Alan H. Arnold; Éditions Alphonse Leduc

- Toshi Ichiyanagi (1933–2022)

Duet for piano and string instrument (1961); C.F. Peters

- Airat Ichmouratov (b. 1973)

Concerto No. 1 for viola and orchestra, Op.7 (2004); Canadian Music Centre
Concerto No. 2 "in Baroque Style" for viola and orchestra, Op. 41 (2015); Canadian Music Centre
Fantasy on D. Shostakovich's Opera "Lady Macbeth of Mtsensk" for viola and orchestra, Op. 12 (2006)
Three Romances for viola, string orchestra and harp, Op. 22 (2009); Canadian Music Centre
Sonata for viola and piano, Op. 10 (2005)

- Akira Ifukube (1914–2006)

La Fontaine sacrée (聖なる泉) for soprano, viola, bassoon and harp (1964, 2000); arrangement by the composer from the 1964 film score Mothra vs. Godzilla
Lake Kimtaankamuito (Lake Mashū) (摩周湖, Mashū-ko) for soprano, viola and harp or piano (1992)

- Shin'ichirō Ikebe (b. 1943)

Bivalence III for 2 violas (1999); Zen-On Music Company
Emerald Colored Haze: In the Cold Morning (瑠璃色の靄 – 冷たい朝に) for ondes Martenot and viola (1997)

- Alexander Ilyinsky (1859–1920)

Berceuse (Колыбельная песня) from Noure and Anitra (Нур и Анитра) for viola and piano, Op. 13 (1907); original for orchestra; transcription by Watson Forbes; Chester Music

- Kamran İnce (b. 1960)

Road to Memphis for viola and harpsichord (2008)

- Vincent d'Indy (1851–1931)

Choral varié for saxophone or viola and orchestra, Op. 55 (1903)
Lied for cello or viola and orchestra, Op. 19 (1884)

- Richard Ingham (b. 1954)

Nature Morte au Panier for viola solo (2009)

- Désiré-Émile Inghelbrecht (1880–1965)

Impromptu in F minor for viola and piano (1922); Éditions Alphonse Leduc
Nocturne for cello (or violin, or viola) and piano (1922); A.Z. Mathot
Prélude et Saltarelle for viola and piano (1907); A.Z. Mathot

- Atli Ingólfsson (b. 1962)

Annað sjálf álfsins (The Elves' Other Self) for viola solo (1994); Iceland Music Information Centre

- Pedro Ipuche-Riva (1924–1996)

Sonata en re for viola and piano (1959–1961)

- Gabriel Iranyi (b. 1946)

Hommage à György Kurtág, 3 Pieces for viola solo (1999)
Sonata for violin or viola solo (2010–2011)

- John Ireland (1879–1962)

The Holy Boy for viola and piano; transcription by Lionel Tertis (published 1918)
Sonata in G minor for viola and piano (1923); original for cello and piano; transcription by Lionel Tertis (1941); Augener

- Yoshirō Irino (1921–1980)

Suite (無伴奏ヴィオラのための組曲) for viola solo (1971)

- Regina Irman (b. 1957)

Hügel bei Céret for 2 violas and double bass (1983); Musikedition Nepomuk Rupperswil; Édition Musicale Suisse

- Mark Isaacs (b. 1958)

Night Songs for viola and piano (2004); Australian Music Centre

- Kan Ishii (1921–2009)

Sonata for viola and piano (1962); Ongaku-no-tomo Edition

- Timur Ismagilov (b. 1982)

Novella (Новелла) for viola solo, Op. 23 (2010)
Fantasia (Фантазия) for viola and piano, Op. 46 (2019–2020)

- André Isoir (1935–2016)

3 Pièces for viola and piano (2006); Editions Delatour

- Miloslav Ištvan (1928–1990)

Canto No. 1 for viola solo (1978–1979); Český Hudební Fond
Canto No. 2 for prepared violas and female voice (1980)
Fantasie for clarinet, viola and piano (1949); Český Hudební Fond
Mikrosvěty mého města (Micro-Worlds of My Town) for 2 violas, oboe and clarinet (1977); Český Hudební Fond
Písně (Songs) for soprano, viola and piano (1949); Český Hudební Fond
Ronda (Rondos) for viola and piano (1950); Editio Bärenreiter Praha; Český Hudební Fond
Rotace a návraty (Rotations and Returns), 4 Movements for English horn, viola and cello (1988); Český Hudební Fond

- Jean Eichelberger Ivey (1923–2010)

Aldébaran for viola and tape (1972); Carl Fischer
Music for viola and piano (1976); Carl Fischer

== J ==
- Gabriel Jackson (b. 1962)

Lunae glaciales for piccolo (flute), viola and harp (1996, revised 1999)

- Gordon Jacob (1895–1984)

Adagio and Allegro by Antonio Vivaldi; arrangement for viola and piano (1939) by Gordon Jacob
Air and Dance for viola and piano (1957); Oxford University Press
Concert Piece for viola and orchestra (1977); Corda Music Publications
Concerto No. 1 in C minor (in One Movement) for viola and orchestra (1925, revised 1976); Boosey & Hawkes; Oxford University Press
Concerto No. 2 in G major for viola and string orchestra (1979); Boosey & Hawkes
Hearken Unto Me for soprano, viola and organ (1978)
A Little Minuet for viola and piano (1972); in New Pieces for Viola, Book 1; Associated Board of the Royal Schools of Music
Miniature Suite for clarinet and viola (1956); Breitkopf & Härtel; Musica Rara
Nocturne for viola and cello (1959); Corda Music Publications
Prelude, Passacaglia and Fugue for violin and viola (1948); Stainer & Bell
Rigadoon for viola and piano (1972); in New Pieces for Viola, Book 1; Associated Board of the Royal Schools of Music
Sonata No. 1 for viola and piano (1949); Anglo-American Music Publishers
Sonata No. 2 for viola and piano (1978); Anglo-American Music Publishers
Sonatina for 2 violas (1973); Oxford University Press
Sonatina for viola or clarinet and piano (1946); Novello & Co.
Suite for 8 violas (1976); Anglo-American Music Publishers
Three Pieces (Elegy, Ostinato, Scherzo) for viola and piano (1930); J. Curwen & Sons
Trio for clarinet, viola and piano (1969); Breitkopf & Härtel; Musica Rara
Trotting Tune for viola and piano (1972); in New Pieces for Viola, Book 1; Associated Board of the Royal Schools of Music
Variations for solo viola (1975); Breitkopf & Härtel; Musica Rara
When Autumn Comes for viola and piano (1972); in New Pieces for Viola, Book 1; Associated Board of the Royal Schools of Music

- Frederick Jacobi (1891–1952)

Fantasy for viola and piano (1941); Carl Fischer
Penelope for viola and piano (1943); Independent Music Publishers

- Maurice Jacobson (1896–1976)

Berceuse for viola and piano (1946); Oxford University Press
Humoreske for viola and piano (1948); Alfred Lengnick
Lament for viola and piano (1941)
Salcey Lawn for viola and piano (1946); Augener

- Hanoch Jacoby (1909–1990)

Concertino for viola and orchestra (1939); Israeli Music Institute
King David's Lyre (כינור היה לדוד) for viola and piano (1948) or viola and string orchestra (1978); Israeli Music Institute
Three Songs (שלושה שירים) for mezzo-soprano, viola and piano (1938); words by Rainer Maria Rilke; Israeli Music Institute

- Leoš Janáček (1854–1928)

Říkadla (Nursery Rhymes) for voice(s), viola and piano; Universal Edition

- Nino Janjgava (b. 1964)

E-flat and D-sharp (მი ბემოლი და რე დიეზი; Mi bémol et ré dièse; Es und Dis) for guitar and 6 violas, Op. 37 (2002)

- Karel Janovický (b. 1930)

Sonata for viola and piano, Op. 12 (1955); Český Hudební Fond
Sonata for viola and piano (2008)
Terzina for viola and piano (1978)

- Leopold Jansa (1795–1875)

Cantilène for viola and piano, Op. 84 (1867); Laurentius-Musikverlag
6 Duos for violin and viola, Op. 70 (1845)

- Pierre Jansen (1930–2015)

3 Caractères (3 Characters) for viola and piano (2003); Editions Delatour
Duo for violin and viola (2006); Editions Delatour
Concerto for viola and chamber orchestra (1988); Éditions Salabert

- Robert Janssens (b. 1939)

Ballade for viola and piano (2002); Fibonacci Publishing
Mutatis mutandis for viola and piano (1991); Alain Van Kerckhoven Editeur
Sonata for viola and piano; Éditions J. Maurer

- Émile Jaques-Dalcroze (1865–1950)

Chant mélancholique et romance for violin (or viola) and piano, Op. 2 (1892)
Larmes, Pièce lyrique for soprano, viola (or cello) and piano (1902)

- Armas Järnefelt (1869–1958)

Kehtolaulu (Berceuse) for viola and piano (1904); original for orchestra

- Michael Jarrell (b. 1958)

Assonance IV for tuba, viola and live electronics (1990); Éditions Henry Lemoine
Émergences-Résurgences for viola and orchestra (2016); Éditions Henry Lemoine
From the Leaves of Shadow for viola and orchestra (1991); Éditions Henry Lemoine
...more leaves... for viola, 5 instruments and electronics (2000); Éditions Henry Lemoine
...some leaves II... for viola solo (1998); Éditions Henry Lemoine

- Keith Jarrett (b. 1945)

Bridge of Light for viola and orchestra (1990); Edition Schott

- Sándor Jemnitz (1890–1963)

Duo-Sonata for viola and cello, Op. 25 (1927); Edition Schott
Sonata for viola solo, Op. 46 (1941); Rózsavölgyi; Editio Musica Budapest

- Zoltán Jeney (1943–2019)

Aritmíe – Ritmiche for flute, viola and cello (1967)
A Leaf Falls: Brackets to e. e. cummings for violin or viola (with contact microphone) and prepared piano (1975); Editio Musica Budapest

- Joseph Willcox Jenkins (1928–2014)

Sonata (in One Movement) No. 1 in D minor for viola and piano, Op. 7 (1950)

- Donald Martin Jenni (1937–2006)

Musica dell'estate for viola alone (1974); Associated Music Publishers

- Willem Jeths (b. 1959)

Capriccio for violin or viola solo (2009)
Elegia for viola solo (2002); Donemus
Meme for 2 violas and orchestra (2006); Donemus

- Ivan Jevtić (b. 1947)

Grand Trio for violin, viola and piano (1992)
Préludes for viola and piano (1987); Éditions Gérard Billaudot; United Music Publishers
Soleil, soleil!! La nuit tombe... for 4 violas (1997)
Sonata for viola solo (1996)
Vers Byzance... (To Byzantium), Concerto for viola and string orchestra (1984); Éditions Gérard Billaudot; United Music Publishers

- Marta Jiráčková (b. 1932)

Růžová pivoňka (The Pink Peony; Die Rosa Pfingstrose), Fantasie on the Painting by Bohumil Klimeš-Kozina for viola and piano, Op. 56 (2000); Český Hudební Fond
Svatý Václave (Saint Wenceslas), Evocation of the Ancient Choral Manuscript for soprano, viola and piano, Op. 39 (1991); Český Hudební Fond

- Karel Boleslav Jirák (1891–1972)

Smuteční hudba (Funeral Music) for viola and organ, Op. 58 (1946) for viola and orchestra (1962); Český Hudební Fond
Sonata for viola and piano, Op. 26 (1925); N. Simrock, Leipzig

- Joseph Joachim (1831–1907)

Drei Stücke (3 Pieces) for violin or viola and piano, Op. 2 (c.1848–1852)
1. Romanze
2. Fantasiestück
3. Eine Frühlingsfantasie
Hebräische Melodien, nach Eindrücken der Byron'schen Gesänge (Hebrew Melodies, after Impressions of Byron's Songs) for viola and piano, Op. 9 (1854–1855)
Variationen über ein eigenes Thema (Variations on an Original Theme) in E major for viola and piano, Op. 10 (1854)

- Otto Joachim (1910–2010)

Dialogue for viola and piano (1964); Canadian Music Centre
Music for Violin and Viola (1953); Canadian Music Centre
Petite œuvre for flute, viola and cello (2000); Canadian Music Centre
Requiem for viola solo (1976); Canadian Music Centre

- Bertil Palmar Johansen (b. 1954)

Capriccio for viola solo (1993); Music Information Centre Norway

- David Johnson (1942–2009)

The Ballad of Thomas the Rhymer, Concerto for viola and chamber orchestra (1972); Scottish Music Centre

- Tom Johnson (b. 1939)

Action Music IV for viola solo (1968); Two-Eighteen Press; Editions 75
Tilework: Canon in Three Tempos (2:3:4) for viola solo (2003); Two-Eighteen Press; Editions 75
Verses for viola solo (1976); Two-Eighteen Press

- Betsy Jolas (b. 1926)

L'ardente for viola and piano (1978); Éditions Heugel
Come Follow for bassoon and viola (2001)
Episode sixième for viola solo (1984); Alphonse Leduc
Frauenleben for viola and orchestra (1992); Éditions Billaudot
Frauenliebe for viola and piano (2011)
Music to Go for viola and cello (1995); Éditions Salabert
Points d'aube for viola and 13 wind instruments (1968); Éditions Heugel
Quatre Duos for viola and piano (1979); Éditions Heugel
Remember for English horn or viola and cello (1971); Éditions Heugel
Ruht wohl for viola and piano (2011)

- André Jolivet (1905–1974)

Chant d'oppression for viola and piano (1935); Éditions Salabert
Cinq églogues for viola solo (1967); Gérard Billaudot
Petite suite for flute, viola and harp (1941); Éditions Musicales Transatlantiques

- Jens Joneleit (b. 1968)

Sonata Semplice for viola solo, Op. 98 (1998); Alliance Publications
Vers Divin for viola solo, Op. 91 (1995); Alliance Publications

- Charles Jones (1910–1997)

Threemody for viola solo (1947)
Triptychon for violin, viola and piano (1975)

- Daniel Jones (1912–1993)

8 Pieces for viola and piano (1948)
Sonata for viola and piano (1937)
Suite: 6 Movements from a Twelve-tone Row for viola and cello (1949); Robert Lienau; C.F. Peters

- Matthew Jones (b. 1974)

Fantasia on "My Welsh Home" for viola solo (2002)

- Robert W. Jones (1932–1997)

Airs and Fancies, Some Pleasant Music for 2 violas
Concerto for viola and orchestra (1984)
A Joyful Noise for high voice and viola
Sonata da chiesa (Words of Praise) for solo viola and mixed chorus
Sonata for Worship No. 8 for viola and organ
Sonatina for viola and piano
Songs and Dances for viola and cello (1985); Latham Music
Tower Sonatina for viola and piano
Twogether for flute and viola (1989)

- Marinus De Jong (1891–1984)

Blancifloer's klacht (Blancifloer's Complaint) for mezzo-soprano, viola and piano, Op. 70 (1947); CeBeDeM
Concerto for viola and orchestra, Op. 111 (1958); CeBeDeM
Epische Ballade "Mitsanoboe" for viola and piano, Op. 65 (1957); CeBeDeM
Sonata for viola solo, Op. 106 (1973); Metropolis Music Publishers

- Joseph Jongen (1873–1953)

Adagio for violin and viola, Op. 22 No. 1 (1901); CeBeDeM
Allegro Appassionato for viola and piano or orchestra, Op. 79 (1925); Masters Music
Andante Espressivo for viola and piano (1900); CeBeDeM
Andantino grazioso for viola and piano; CeBeDeM
Carnaval for viola and orchestra
Concertino for viola and piano, Op. 111 (1940); Éditions Max Eschig
Introduction et Danse for viola and piano or orchestra, Op. 102 (1935); Éditions Max Eschig; Associated Music Publishers
Lecture for double bass or viola (1927); CeBeDeM
Prélude, variations et finale, Trio for violin, viola and piano, Op. 30 (1906–1907); Éditions Durand
Suite in D major for viola and piano or orchestra, Op. 48 (1915); Henry Lemoine

- Léon Jongen (1884–1969)

Aria for viola solo (1957); CeBeDeM
Lecture for viola solo (1956); CeBeDeM
Pastorale et gigue for viola and piano (1955); Éditions Musicale Brogneaux; CeBeDeM

- Mihail Jora (1891–1971)

Sonata for viola and piano, Op. 32 (1956); Editura de Stat Pentru Literatură şi Artă, București

- Wilfred Josephs (1927–1997)

Concerto for viola and small orchestra, Op. 131 (1983); Mornington Music; Novello & Co.
Meditatio de Beommundo, Concertante for viola and small orchestra, Op. 30 (1960–1961); Edition Eulenburg; Josef Weinberger

- Christian Jost (b. 1963)

Hamlet Echoes for voice, viola and piano (2008); Schott Music
Mozarts 13097. Tag, Sinfonia Concertante for violin, viola and orchestra (2005); Schott Music

- Werner Josten (1885–1963)

Sonata for cello (or viola, or clarinet) and piano (1938); Associated Music Publishers

- John Joubert (1927–2019)

Four Images for oboe, viola and harp, Op. 149 (2003); Maecenas Music
Six Miniatures after Kilvert for violin and viola, Op. 140 (1997); Novello & Co.
Sonata for viola and piano, Op. 6 (1952); Novello & Co.

- Paul Juon (1872–1940)

Divertimento in C major for clarinet and 2 violas, Op. 34 (1906); Robert Lienau; Edition Peters
Romanze in F minor for viola (or cello) and piano (1898, 1899); adaptation from movement II of the Violin Sonata, Op. 7; Schlesinger
Wiegenliedchen (Slumber Song) for viola and piano, Op. 38, No. 6 (1926); original for piano; Schlesinger, E.C. Schirmer
Sonata in D major for viola and piano, Op. 15 (1901)
Sonata in F minor for viola and piano, Op. 82a (1923)

- Liis Jürgens (b. 1983)

Ämbliktektoonika (Spidertectonics) for viola solo (2007)

== K ==
- Ričardas Kabelis (b. 1957)

Dasonata for violin, viola and piano (1980)
Ląstelė (Cell; Zelle) for violin, viola and piano (1992); Sema Edition; Lithuanian Music Information and Publishing Centre
Syrtium for soprano, viola and bassoon (1985); words by Leonardas Gutauskas
Schattenspiel for soprano and viola (1981); words by Leonardas Gutauskas
Viola for viola and live electronics (1994)

- Pál Kadosa (1903–1983)

Concertino for viola and orchestra, Op. 27 (1936); Editio Musica; Zeneműkiadó Vállalat, Budapest

- Jouni Kaipainen (1956–2015)

Concerto for viola and orchestra, Op. 56 (1997); Edition Wilhelm Hansen
Inno for viola and piano or harp, Op. 91g (2010–2013)
Sonata for viola and piano or harp, Op. 91e/f (2010–2013)

- Viktor Kalabis (1923–2006)

Sonata for viola and piano, Op. 84 (1997); Český Hudební Fond
Tristium, Concerto Fantasia for viola and string orchestra, Op. 56 (1981); Český Hudební Fond

- Vakhtang Kakhidze (b. 1959)

Brüderschaft (Брудершафт) for viola, piano and string orchestra (1996)

- Johannes Kalitzke (b. 1959)

Flucht im Gewölbe (Escape the Vault), Spiral for solo viola and digital space simulation (1987)
Labyrinth (Kafka-Komplex I), Spiral for solo viola and digital space simulation (1989); Boosey & Hawkes
Trio infernal, Gespenstermechanik in 5 Kapiteln (Ghosts Mechanics in 5 Parts) for viola, cello and double bass (1985); Edition Gravis

- Jan Kalivoda (1801–1866)

2 Duos for violin and viola, Op. 208 (1855)
Fantaisie: Souvenir de Cherubini in F major for viola and piano, Op. 204 (1855)
6 Nocturnes for viola and piano, Op. 186 (1851); published 1882

- Friedrich Kalkbrenner (1785–1849)

Duos for violin, viola or cello and piano, Op. 11
Grand Duo in D minor for flute (or cello, or viola, or violin) and piano, Op. 63 (c.1824)

- Sándor Kallós (b. 1935)

3 Ricercari (Три ричеркара) for viola solo; Sovetsky Kompozitor

- Edvin Kallstenius (1881–1967)

Cavatina for viola and chamber orchestra, Op. 30 (1943); STIM; Swedish Music Information Centre
Visa (Canzone) from Dalarapsodi (Dalecarlia Rhapsody) for cello (or viola) and organ, Op. 18 (1931); original for orchestra; Eriks Musikandel och Förlag

- László Kalmár (1931–1995)

Terzina for violin, viola and harp (1976); Editio Musica Budapest

- Heinrich Kaminski (1886–1946)

Magnificat for solo soprano, solo viola, small off-stage chorus and orchestra (1925); Universal Edition
Präludium und Fuge (Prelude and Fugue) in C major for viola solo (1931–1932); C.F. Peters

- Arthur Kampela (b. 1960)

Bridges for solo viola (1994)

- Giya Kancheli (1935–2019)

Abii Ne Viderem (Left In Order Not To See) for viola solo, piano, bass-guitar and string orchestra (1992); G. Schirmer
Caris Mere for soprano and viola (1994); G. Schirmer
Styx for viola, mixed choir and orchestra (1999); G. Schirmer
Vom Winde Beweint (Mourned by the Wind), Liturgy for solo viola and orchestra (1989); G. Schirmer

- Sukhi Kang (1934–2020)

Dialog for viola and piano (1978); Edition Modern, München

- Shigeru Kan-no (b. 1959)

Concerto for viola and orchestra, WVE 236 (2006)
Der Cid Suite for flute, viola and harp, WVE 181e (2001)
Der Cid Suite for viola and piano, WVE 181j (2002)
Four Elemente for clarinet, violin and viola, WVE 82 (1994)
Iikangen-Trio for alto saxophone, viola and piano, WVE 261 (2008)
Image for viola and piano, WVE 208e (2005)
Kleines Stück (Little Piece) for 2 metal percussionists and 4 violas (1987, revised 1996)
Kyosou for tenor saxophone and viola, WVE 80 (1994)
Semi-Kyosou for bass saxophone and viola, WVE 80a (1994)
Super Solo for viola solo, WVE 180d (2001)

- Jan Kapr (1914–1988)

Fantasie for viola and piano (1937); Hudební Matice Umělecké Besedy
String Quartet No. 8 for viola (as the main instrument), two violins and cello (1976); Panton

- Nikolai Kapustin (1937–2020)

Sonata for viola and piano, Op. 69 (1992); Schott Music
Sonatina for viola and piano, Op. 158 (2015); Schott Music

- Ivan Karabyts (1945–2002)

Impromptu (Експромт) for viola and piano (1976)
Valse (Вальс) for viola solo (1995); Duma Music

- Louis Karchin (b. 1951)

Fantasy for violin or viola solo (1972); American Composers Alliance
Viola Variations for viola and piano (1981); C.F. Peters

- Sigfrid Karg-Elert (1877–1933)

Sonata No. 2 in B major for clarinet or viola and piano, Op. 139b (1919); Musikverlage Zimmermann

- Kjell Mørk Karlsen (b. 1947)

Concerto for viola and string orchestra, Op. 159 (2007); Music Information Centre Norway
Partita brevis over en norsk folketone for viola and organ (or piano), Op. 7 No. 5 (1993); Norsk Musikforlag
Sonata Nova for viola and piano, Op. 101 (1992); Music Information Centre Norway

- Jurgis Karnavičius (1884–1941)

Daina (Song) for voice and viola (published 1924); words by Percy Bysshe Shelley; Muzsektor gosudarstvennoe izdatelstva; Vaga, Vilnius
Gluosnį linguoja (Swinging Willow) for voice and viola (1916); words by Konstantin Balmont; Lithuanian Music Information and Publishing Centre
Serenada (Serenade) for voice and viola (1916); words by Afanasy Fet; Lithuanian Music Information and Publishing Centre
To for voice and viola (published 1924); words by Percy Bysshe Shelley; Muzsektor gosudarstvennoe izdatelstva; Vaga, Vilnius
Žiedlapėliai putokšlio (Milkwort Petals) for voice and viola (1916); words by Konstantin Balmont; Lithuanian Music Information and Publishing Centre

- Richard Karpen (b. 1957)

Aperture for amplified viola and interactive electronics (2006)
Solo/Tutti: Variations on an Irrational Number for amplified viola and real-time computer processing (2002)

- Laura Karpman (b. 1959)

About Joshua for flute, viola and harp (2003); Fat Rock Inc.
Common Tone for 5-string electric viola and electronics (2003); MMB Music
...For Viola and Piano (1983); MMB Music
Rounds for viola and piano (2000); MMB Music

- Elena Kats-Chernin (b. 1957)

For Alex No. 2 (Robyn's Request) for viola and piano (2004); Australian Music Centre
Gypsy Ramble for viola, cello and piano (1996); Boosey & Hawkes; Australian Music Centre
Still Life for viola and piano (2001); Boosey & Hawkes; Australian Music Centre
Three Interludes for solo viola (2000, 2003); Boosey & Hawkes; Australian Music Centre
1. Rag Interlude
2. Tranquil Interlude
3. Naive Interlude

- Dick Kattenburg (1919–1944)

Allegro Moderato (Movement I of a Viola Sonata) for viola and piano (1944)

- Georg Katzer (1935–2019)

Kette (Chain) for viola solo (1986); Deutscher Verlag für Musik
Mi for flute, viola and harp (1987)
Miteinander–Gegeneinander (Cooperation–Conflict), Duo concertante for English horn and viola (1982); Deutscher Verlag für Musik; Breitkopf & Härtel
Wiedergänge (Recourses) for oboe, horn and viola (2003)

- Hugo Kauder (1888–1972)

Kleine Suite (Little Suite) in A minor for viola solo (1924); Universal Edition; Seesaw Music
Kleine Suite (Little Suite) for viola and piano (1939); Seesaw Music
Serenade for flute, violin and viola (1947); Seesaw Music
Sonata No. 1 in F major for viola and piano (1918); Seesaw Music
Sonata No. 2 in G for viola and piano (1938); Seesaw Music
Sonata No. 3 in D for viola and piano (1953); Seesaw Music
Sonata No. 4 in D for viola and piano (1958); Seesaw Music
Sonata for cello or viola and harp (1955); Seesaw Music
Sonatina for cello or viola and piano (1953); Seesaw Music
Suite No. 1 for flute, violin and viola (1971); Seesaw Music
Suite No. 2 for flute, violin and viola (1972); Seesaw Music
Trio for flute, violin and viola (1969); Seesaw Music
Trio for oboe, viola and piano (1916); Universal Edition; Seesaw Music
Trio for clarinet, viola and piano (1957); Seesaw Music
Trio No. 1 for flute, oboe and viola (1936); Seesaw Music
Trio No. 2 for flute, oboe and viola (1960); Seesaw Music

- Walter Kaufmann (1907–1984)

Partita for viola solo
Sonata for 3 violas (1980)
Suite for 3 violas (c.1965)

- Masaru Kawasaki (1924–2018)

La Preghiera (祈り Inori), Prayer Music No. 4 for viola solo (2006); Academia Music (アカデミア・ミュージック)

- Don Kay (b. 1933)

Canzona I for flute and viola (1974); Australian Music Centre
Canzona II for flute and viola (1972); Australian Music Centre
Canzona III for flute and viola (1974); Australian Music Centre
Cloud Patterns for solo viola (1988); Australian Music Centre
Concert Music for viola and string orchestra (1973); Australian Music Centre
Earth Forms for solo viola (1989); Australian Music Centre

- Ulysses Kay (1917–1995)

Sonatina (in 1 Movement) for viola and piano, W2 (1939); American Composers Alliance

- Heinrich Ernst Kayser (1815–1888)

Grand duo concertant in B♭ major for clarinet (or violin) and viola, Op. 2
Duo concertant for clarinet and viola, Op. 27 (1865)
Nouvelle méthode d'alto (New Viola Method), Op. 54 (published c.1880)

- Minna Keal (1909–1999)

Ballade in F minor for viola (or cello) and piano (1929); Corda Music Publications

- Nigel Keay (b. 1955)

Adagietto Antique, Trio for clarinet, viola and piano (2009)
Concerto for viola and orchestra (2000); Centre for New Zealand Music
Double Jeu for 2 violas (2012); Centre for New Zealand Music
Labyrinthe for flute and viola (2018)
Moderato à cent d'huîtres for viola and piano (2014); Centre for New Zealand Music
Terrestrial Mirror for flute, viola and harp (2004)
Visconti Variations, Duo for violin and viola (2008); Centre for New Zealand Music

- Andrew Keeling (b. 1955)

Meditatio (Rosa) for solo viola, harp, cimbalom and string orchestra (1989, revised 1992)
Off the Beaten Track for viola and prepared piano (1999)

- Milko Kelemen (1924–2018)

Phantasmen for viola and orchestra (1985); Hans Sikorski
Trois Danses (Three Dances) for viola and string orchestra (1957); London Universal Edition

- Homer Keller (1915–1996)

Sonata for viola and piano (1951); American Composers Alliance

- Max E. Keller (b. 1947)

Inseln for viola and cello (2002); Édition Musicale Suisse
Kreisen in den Tiefen for viola, cello and double bass (1988); Édition Musicale Suisse
Unione e tremolo for violin and viola (2002); Édition Musicale Suisse

- Robert Kelly (1916–2007)

Concerto for viola and orchestra, Op. 53 (1976); American Composers Alliance
Concerto for violin, viola and orchestra, Op. 57 (1980); American Composers Alliance
Sonata for viola and piano, Op. 16 (1950); American Composers Alliance
Suite for solo viola, Op. 28 (1955); transcription of the Cello Suite; American Composers Alliance
Theme and Variations for violin, viola and piano, Op. 11 (1947); American Composers Alliance
Three Expressions for violin and cello (or viola), Op. 49 (1971); American Composers Alliance

- Rudolf Kelterborn (1931–2021)

Concerto for viola and orchestra (2009); Tre Media Musikverlage
Duett for viola and contrabass clarinet (1989); Tre Media Musikverlage
Kammermusik (Chamber Music) for flute, viola and piano (1957); Edition Modern
Monodie II for flute, viola and harp (1977–1990); Hug Musikverlage
Neun Momente (Nine Moments) for viola and piano (1973); Bote & Bock; Boosey & Hawkes
Six Short Pieces for flute, viola and guitar (1984); Bote & Bock

- Wilhelm Kempff (1895–1991)

Abendphantasie (Evening Fantasy) for voice, viola and organ, Op. 27 (1926); words by Hans Peter Eisenmann; Edition Walhall

- Tālivaldis Ķeniņš (1919–2008)

Adagio and Fugue for viola, cello and organ (1985); Canadian Music Centre
Canzona Sonata for solo viola and string orchestra (1986); Canadian Music Centre
Concerto for viola and orchestra (1998)
Elegy and Rondo for viola and piano (1979); Canadian Music Centre
Fantasy-Variations on an Eskimo Lullaby for flute and viola (1967–1972); Canadian Music Centre
Partita Breve for viola and piano (1971); Canadian Music Centre
Sonata for viola and piano (1995); Canadian Music Centre

- Kent Wheeler Kennan (1913–2003)

Nocturne for viola and orchestra (No. 2 of Three Pieces for orchestra) (1937); Eastman Rochester Archives; Prairie Dawg Press

- Oliver Kentish (b. 1954)

Draumar og dansar (Dreams and Dances) for viola and chamber orchestra (2002); Íslenzk Tónverkamiðstöð
Jakobslag, Little Duet for viola and marimba (1999); Íslenzk Tónverkamiðstöð
Kvinnan fróma for viola and piano (2008); Íslenzk Tónverkamiðstöð
Prelúdía og fúga (Prelude and Fugue) for 10 violas (2005); Íslenzk Tónverkamiðstöð

- Mihkel Kerem (b. 1981)

Bullocks to That for viola solo (2014)
Carmina Contrita for viola and cello (2020)
Concerto for viola and orchestra (1994)
Lament (Lamento) for cello or viola and string orchestra (2008, 2009); Fennica Gehrman
Max's Spider for viola solo (2015)
Nimetud lood (Nameless Pieces) for clarinet, viola and piano (2006)
Sonata for viola and piano (2007)

- Aaron Jay Kernis (b. 1960)

Concerto for viola and orchestra (2014); AJK Music
Passacaglia-Variations for viola and piano (1985); Associated Music Publishers

- Louise Lincoln Kerr (1892–1977)

Berceuse for viola and piano; Classic Unlimited Music
Etude for violin and violin (1969); American Viola Society Publications
Habañera for viola and piano; Classic Unlimited Music
Lament for viola and piano; Classic Unlimited Music
Las Fatigas del Querer (The Sorrows of Loving) for viola and piano; Classic Unlimited Music
Orientale for violin and violin
Toccata for viola and piano; Classic Unlimited Music

- Gordon Kerry (b. 1961)

Antiphon for solo viola (2000); Australian Music Centre
Caritas for viola and piano (2001); Australian Music Centre
Concerto for viola and orchestra (1992); Australian Music Centre
Etude for solo viola (1999); Australian Music Centre
He Wishes for the Cloths of Heaven for mezzo-soprano and viola (1999); Australian Music Centre
Nocturne for clarinet, viola and piano (2008); Australian Music Centre
Parardi (Rain) for viola and piano (1988); Grevillea Editions
Sinfonia for viola, cello and string orchestra (1993); Australian Music Centre
Solitary Birds for 6 violas (2008); Australian Music Centre

- Willem Kersters (1929–1998)

Sonata for viola and piano, Op. 6 (1954); CeBeDeM

- Aram Khachaturian (1903–1978)

Sonata-Song (Соната-Песня) for viola solo (1976); Soviet Music; G. Schirmer
Suite for viola and piano (1929); published 2011 in Khachaturian: Works for Viola and Piano and Viola Solo (Хачатурян: Произведения для альта и фортепиано и альта соло); Muzyka; Boosey & Hawkes

- Ivan Khandoshkin (1747–1804)

Concerto in C major for viola and orchestra (1801); now thought to be written by Mikhail Goldstein; See musical hoax.
Variations on the Russian Song "I Lost What I Loved" (Вариации на русскую песню "То теряю, что люблю") for viola and piano; transcription by Vadim Borisovsky (published 1955); Gosudarstvennoe muzykalnoe izdatelstvo (State Music Publishing House)

- Quddus Khojamyarov (1918–1994)

3 Pieces (Три пьесы) for viola and piano (1976); Sovetsky Kompozitor

- Michael Kibbe (b. 1945)

Ariam Duo for viola and English horn or clarinet, Op. 123
Duo Sonata for 2 violas, Op. 15
Duo Sonata for viola and double bass, Op. 86 (1985)
Lyric Duo for violin and viola or English horn, Op. 79 (1984)
Malibu Music for violin and viola, Op. 113 (1991)
Partita for viola solo, Op. 118
Pastoral Trio for flute, viola or clarinet and bassoon, Op. 3 (1967); Seesaw Music Corporation
Sonata for viola and piano, Op. 29 (1977)
Trio for flute, viola and harp, Op. 99 (1989); Fatrock Ink
Views of Atlantis for oboe, viola and piano, Op. 136 (2001)

- Friedrich Kiel (1821–1885)

Sonata in G minor for viola and piano, Op. 67 (1870)
3 Romanzen for viola and piano, Op. 69 (1871)

- Peter Kiesewetter (1945–2012)

Bereshit (בראשית), Azione sacra for soprano, viola, zither, percussion and tape, Op. 70 (1995–1996)
Sancti Francisci Laudes Creaturarum for soprano, viola and string orchestra (or organ), Op. 45 (1991); Klangmueller-Edition
Shir (שיר) for viola solo, Op. 62 No. 1 (1990); Vierdreiunddreissig Musikverlag
Shoshanim (שושנים) for viola and zither, Op. 61 No. 1 (1993); Vierdreiunddreissig Musikverlag

- Valeri Kikta (b. 1941)

Concerto for viola and orchestra (1974)
Nocturne (Ноктюрн) for flute, viola and harp (1979)
Sonata for viola and harp (2001)
Sonata for viola and harp (2002)
Trio in Honor of M. N. Yermolova (Трио в честь М. Н. Ермоловой) for flute, viola and harp (1985)

- Wilhelm Killmayer (1927–2017)

Die Schönheit des Morgens (The Beauty of Morning), 5 Romances for viola and piano (1994); Edition Schott

- Alastair King (b. 1967)

Claire's Three Piece Suite for clarinet or viola (1997); Chester Music Ltd

- John Kinsella (1932–2021)

Dialogue for viola solo (1991); Contemporary Music Centre Ireland
Rhapsody on a Poem of Joseph Campbell for viola solo (1975); Contemporary Music Centre Irelan

- Theodor Kirchner (1823–1903)

Acht Stücke (8 Pieces) for viola and piano, Op. 79 (1886); original for piano solo

- Volker David Kirchner (1942–2020)

Nachtstück: Varianten über eine Wagnersche Akkordverbindung (Nocturne: Variants on a Wagnerian Chord Progression) for viola and chamber orchestra (1980–1981, revised 1983); Schott Music
Schibboleth, Poème Concertante for viola and orchestra (1989); Schott Music

- Victor Kissine (b. 1953)

Duo (after Osip Mandelstam) for viola and cello (1998); M.P. Belaieff

- Cyrill Kistler (1848–1907)

Serenade in D minor for violin, or viola (viola alta), or cello and orchestra, Op. 72 (1903)

- Uuno Klami (1900–1961)

Sonata in B♭ minor for viola and piano, Op. 6 (1920); Fennica Gehrman

- Peter Klatzow (1945–2021)

Sonata In Memory of Oleg for viola solo (2009)
The World of Paul Klee for flute, viola and harp (1972)
The World of Paul Klee III for mezzo-soprano, flute, viola and harp (1972)

- Dmitri Klebanov (1907–1987)

Concerto for viola and string orchestra (1983)

- Ståle Kleiberg (b. 1958)

Concerto for viola and orchestra (2019–2020); Norsk Musikforlag
Trio Luna for flute (alto flute), viola and harp (2016); Norsk Musikforlag

- Gideon Klein (1919–1945)

Duo v systému čtvrttónovém (Duo in Quarter-tone System) for violin and viola (1939–1940); Bote & Bock; Boosey & Hawkes
Preludium for viola solo (1940); Bote & Bock; Boosey & Hawkes

- Richard Rudolf Klein (1921–2011)

Choral-Triptychon for viola and organ (1998); Edition P.J. Tonger
Memorial for viola solo (1996); Edition P.J. Tonger
Sonatina for viola and piano (1965); Möseler Verlag

- Paul Klengel (1854–1935)

Drei Romanzen (3 Romances) for viola and piano, Op. 46 (1912)
Sechs Stücke (6 Pieces) for viola and piano, Op. 39 (1910)
Serenade for violin and viola, Op. 45 (1911)
Vier Phantasiestücke (4 Fantasy Pieces) for viola and piano, Op. 48 (1912)

- John Klenner (1899–1955)

Fantasia for viola and orchestra; Sprague-Coleman

- Karl Klingler (1879–1971)

Phantasie-Sonate in C minor for viola solo (1953)
Sonata in D minor for viola and piano (1909); N. Simrock

- Friedrich Klose (1862–1942)

Elegie for violin or viola and piano, Op. 7 (1889)

- August Klughardt (1847–1902)

Schilflieder (Songs of the Reeds), 5 Fantasy Pieces for oboe (or violin), viola and piano, Op. 28 (1872); after poems of Nikolaus Lenau

- Julia Klumpkey (1870–1961)

Lullaby in F major for viola and piano (published 1937); Wesley Webster; American Viola Society Publications
Quatre pièces (4 Pieces) for viola and piano (published 1932); Éditions M. Senart
San Francisco Bay, Suite for viola and piano (published 1951); Wesley Webster
Second Suite for viola and piano (published 1935); George Austin

- Jan Klusák (b. 1934)

Monolog "Ubi vult" (Monologue "Ubi vult") for viola solo (1987)
Partita for viola solo (1954)
Rejdovák for bass clarinet, viola and double bass (1965); Český Hudební Fond

- Armin Knab (1881–1951)

Rosa Mystica for alto and viola (1949); Edition Schott

- Adrian Knight (b. 1987)

Livet Innanför Väggarna (Life inside Walls) for 2 violas, cello and double bass (2008–2009); Swedish Music Information Centre

- Edward Knight (b. 1961)

Beneath a Cinnamon Moon for clarinet, viola and piano (2007); Subito Music
Inbox for flute, viola and piano (2010); Subito Music

- Milan Knížák (b. 1940)

Sonata for viola solo (2005); Český Hudební Fond

- Charles Knox (1929–2019)

Music for Viola and Percussion (1989); C. Alan Publications

- Garth Knox (b. 1956)

Fuga libre for viola solo (2008); Schott Music
Jonah and the Whale for viola and tuba (2009)
Ockeghem Fantasy for viola d'amore and 5 violas (2009)
Viola Spaces, Contemporary Viola Studies for viola solo (2004, 2007); Schott Music

- Marcelo Koc (1918–2006)

Concerto for viola and orchestra, Op. 35 (1986); audio link
Concerto for viola and orchestra, Op. 40 (1989)
Diálogos for viola and piano, Op. 31c (1979, 1980); original for violin and piano

- Erland von Koch (1910–2009)

Concerto for viola and orchestra, Op. 33 (1946, revised 1966); STIM; Swedish Music Information Centre
Larghetto for viola (or cello) and piano (1937, revised 1966); Peer Music Classical; Southern Music Publishing
Lyrisk episod (Lyrical Episode) for viola and piano, Op. 29 (1944); STIM; Swedish Music Information Centre
Monolog Nr. 16 (On a Swedish Folk Tune) for viola solo (1978); Carl Gehrmans Musikförlag
Scherzo for viola (or cello) and piano (1937, revised 1966); Peer Music Classical; Southern Music Publishing

- Günter Kochan (1930–2009)

Concerto for viola and orchestra (1973–1974); Verlag Neue Musik
Sonata for viola and piano (1984–1985); Verlag Neue Musik

- Miklós Kocsár (1933–2019)

Concerto lirico for viola and orchestra (2000); Editio Musica Budapest
Duó-Szerenád (Duo Serenade) for violin and viola (1955)
Hét változat mélyhegedűre (7 Variations) for viola solo (1983); Editio Musica Budapest

- František Kočvara (1730?–1791)

3 Sonatas for viola with basso continuo, Op. 1 (published c.1780)
4 Sonatas for viola with basso continuo, Op. 2 (published c.1775)
Trio Sonata VI in C major for 2 violas with basso continuo (published c.1777)

- Zoltán Kodály (1882–1967)

Adagio for violin or viola and piano (1905, revised 1916); transcription for viola and string orchestra by Imre Sulyok (1984); Editio Musica Budapest
Szerenád (Serenade) for 2 violins and viola, Op. 12 (1919–1920); Universal Edition

- Charles Koechlin (1867–1950)

Idylle for 2 clarinets or violin and viola, Op. 155b (1936); Le Chant du Monde
Quatre petites pièces (4 Little Pieces) for horn, violin (or viola) and piano, Op. 32 (1894–1907); Éditions Max Eschig
Sonata for viola and piano, Op. 53 (1911–1913); Editions Maurice Senart

- René Koering (b. 1940)

Symphonie Concertante for violin, viola and string orchestra (2003); Éditions Salabert

- Hans von Koessler (1853–1926)

Trio Suite for violin, viola and piano (c.1919); N. Simrock

- Jan Koetsier (1911–2006)

Concertino for viola and orchestra, Op. 21 (1940, revised 1955); Heinrichshofen Verlag
Concertino Drammatico for violin, viola and string orchestra, Op. 88 (1981); Donemus
Duo Giocoso for trumpet (or oboe) and viola, Op. 69 (1979); Donemus
Introduction and Variations on a Theme from the Opera "Die Zaubergeige" by Werner Egk for viola and piano, Op. 82 No. 3 (1978); Donemus
Trio Romantico for viola, cello and piano, Op. 111 (1987); Donemus

- Ctirad Kohoutek (1929–2011)

Panychida letní noci (Prayer for the Dead), Music in Two Sound Layers for viola, piano, percussion and tape (1968); Český Hudební Fond
Suita romantica for viola and piano (1957); Český Hudební Fond

- Ellis Kohs (1916–2000)

Burlesca II for clarinet, viola and horn (1945); American Composers Alliance
Chamber Concerto for viola and string nonet (1949); Mercury Music
Elegy and Credo for flute, viola and piano (1951–1952)

- Rezső Kókai (1906–1962)

Verbunkos rapszódia (Verbunkos Rhapsody) for violin, or viola, or clarinet, and piano (1952); arrangement by Árpád Kígyósi; Editio Musica Budapest

- Barbara Kolb (b. 1939)

Cavatina for violin or viola solo (1983, revised 1985); Boosey & Hawkes
Related Characters for viola and piano (1982); Boosey & Hawkes

- Mikhail Kollontay (b. 1952)

Concerto for viola and orchestra, Op. 8 (1979–1980)
Sonata "Eight Psalms" (Восемь псалмов) for viola solo, Op. 7 (1977)

- Jō Kondō (b. 1947)

Falling for 2 violas, double bass and electric piano (1973); University of York Music Press
The Moor, Trio for viola, bassoon and piano (1982); University of York Music Press
Res sonorae for oboe, viola and 12 instruments (1987); University of York Music Press

- Eva Noer Kondrup (b. 1964)

Ulvemælk for viola and orchestra (2002); Edition Samfundet

- Štěpán Koníček (1928–2006)

Eine kleine Trauermusik, Quarter-Tone Composition for viola solo (1980); Filmkunst Musikverlag
Duo microtonale, Quarter-Tone Composition for viola and cello (1989); Filmkunst Musikverlag

- Servaes de Koninck (c.1654–c.1701)

Sonata in D minor for viola and harpsichord (c.1700); Broekmans & Van Poppel

- Marek Kopelent (1932–2023)

Toccata for viola and piano (1978); Breitkopf & Härtel

- Herman David Koppel (1908–1998)

Concertino for violin, viola and cello soli with orchestra, Op. 110 (1983); Edition Samfundet
Concerto for violin, viola and orchestra, Op. 43 (1947); Edition Wilhelm Hansen
Divertimento pastorale for oboe, viola and cello, Op. 61 (1955); Edition Samfundet
Patchwork for flute, viola and harp, Op. 106 (1981); Edition Samfundet

- Peter Paul Koprowski (b. 1947)

Concerto for viola and orchestra (1995); Canadian Music Centre

- Mark Kopytman (1929–2011)

Dedication (הקדשה) for viola solo (1986); Israeli Music Publications
Cantus V (V קאנטוס), Concerto for viola and orchestra (1990); Israeli Music Publications
Kaddish (קדיש) for viola and string orchestra (or piano) (1981); Israeli Music Publications

- Peter Jona Korn (1922–1998)

Duo for viola and piano, Op. 66 (1978, 1986); Filmkunst-Musikverlag; Edition Korn

- Egon Kornauth (1891–1959)

Drei Stücke (Three Pieces) for viola and piano, Op. 47 (1954); Ludwig Doblinger
Notturno (Andante) for viola and chamber orchestra, Op. 3b (1912); movement II from the Viola Sonata
Sonata in C♯ minor for viola and piano, Op. 3 (1912); Ludwig Doblinger
Sonatine for viola and piano, Op. 46a (1952); Ludwig Doblinger
Valse triste (from Trio-Suite, Op. 45) for viola and piano (1948); Ludwig Doblinger

- Nikolai Korndorf (1947–2001)

Concerto for viola and string orchestra (1970)
Sonata for viola solo (1970)

- Karl Korte (1928–2022)

Viola Redux, Viola Dance for viola and piano (2000, revised 2006); K-note Press

- Tõnu Kõrvits (b. 1969)

Chaconne for viola solo (2008)

- György Kósa (1897–1984)

Az éj zsoltára (Psalm of the Night) for voice and viola (1964); words by Endre Ady; manuscript lost
Duo for violin and viola (1943); Editio Musica Budapest
Hat új miniatűr (Six New Miniatures) for viola and harp (1969)
Megemlékezés... (In Memoriam...) for viola solo (1977); Editio Musica Budapest
Istenes énekek (Sacred Songs) for tenor, baritone and viola (1936); words by Mihály Babits
Szálkák (Splinters) for voice, viola and cello (1972); words by János Pilinszky

- Viktor Kosenko (1896–1938)

Sonata for viola and piano (1928)

- Pekka Kostiainen (b. 1944)

Sonatina for viola and piano (1980); Edition Fazer; Fennica Gehrman; Warner/Chappell Music Finland; Finnish Music Information Centre

- Péter Kőszeghy (b. 1971)

ENTROPIE/beta for (amplified) viola and percussion (2005)
Mirror for (amplified) viola and CD (2004–2009)
Weibliche Hörbilder, 10 Aphorisms for alto voice and viola (2003)

- Boris Koutzen (1901–1966)

Concerto for viola and orchestra (1949)

- Leo Kraft (1922–2014)

Partita No. 2 for violin and viola (1961); Seesaw Music

- Heinz Kratochwil (1933–1995)

Concerto for viola and chamber orchestra, Op. 67 (1970); Verlag Doblinger
Sonata for viola and piano, Op. 21 (1961); Verlag Doblinger
Spiegelungen (Reflections) for viola, cello and piano, Op. 120 (1980)

- Joseph Martin Kraus (1756–1792)

Concerto in C major for viola and chamber orchestra, VB 153b; attributed to Roman Hoffstetter (1742–1815); Edition Schott
Concerto in E♭ major for viola and chamber orchestra, VB 153c (1785–1787); attributed to Roman Hoffstetter (1742–1815); Willy Müller, Süddeutscher Musikverlag
Concerto in G major for viola and chamber orchestra with cello obbligato, VB 153a (1785–1787); attributed to Roman Hoffstetter (1742–1815); Möseler Verlag
Sonata (Duo) in D major for flute and viola, VB 158 (1778); Amadeus Verlag; Musikverlage Zimmermann

- Veronika Krausas (b. 1963)

Inside the Stone for viola solo (1997); Canadian Music Centre

- Jaroslav Krček (b. 1939)

Hudba (Music) for viola and piano (1968)
Hudba (Music) for viola, bassoon and piano (1977); Český Hudební Fond

- Alexander Krein (1883–1951)

Prologue (Пролог) in F major for viola and piano, Op. 2 (1902–1911, 1927); Sovetsky Kompozitor; Universal Edition

- Ernst Krenek (1900–1991)

Sonata for viola solo, Op. 92 No. 3 (1942); Bomart Music Publications
Sonata for viola and piano, Op. 117 (1948); Affiliated Musicians
Sonatina for flute and viola, Op. 92 No. 2a (1942); Independent Music Publishers
Sonatina for violin and viola (1921)

- Emil Kreuz (1867–1932)

Concerto in C minor for viola and orchestra, Op. 20 (1885); Augener
Der Violaspieler: Sammlung von progressiv geordneten Stücken für Viola und Klavier (The Viola Player: A Series of Progressive Pieces for Viola and Piano), Op. 13

No. 1 – 12 Very Easy Pieces
No. 2 – Progressive and Easy Pieces
Nos. 3 & 4 – 20 Progressive Melodies

Sketch; Augener

No. 5 – 3 Easy Sketches
No. 6 – Sonata in A minor; Amadeus Verlag

4 Duos for violin and viola, Op. 39; Amadeus Verlag
Frühlingsgedanken, 3 Pieces for viola and piano, Op. 9; Augener
Liebesbilder (Pictures of Love), 3 Pieces for viola and piano, Op. 5 (1885); Amadeus Verlag
Suite de pièces for viola and piano, Op. 45 (1897); Augener
Trio in C major for violin, viola and piano, Op. 21 (published 1892); Augener
Trio facile in C for violin, viola and piano, Op. 32; Amadeus Verlag

- Jaroslav Křička (1882–1969)

Sonatina for violin and viola, Op. 48 (1926); Hudební Matice Praha

- Edino Krieger (1928–2022)

Brasiliana for viola and piano (or string orchestra) (1983); L K Produções Artísticas, Rio de Janeiro; Academia Brasileira de Música

- Milan Křížek (1926–2018)

Concerto grosso for violin, viola and orchestra (1989); Český Hudební Fond
Diferencias for viola solo (2014)
Koláž III (Collage III) for 2 violins and viola; Český Hudební Fond
Lyrické fragmenty (Lyric Fragments) for mezzo-soprano, flute and viola (1990); Český Hudební Fond
Sonata for viola solo (1994); Český Hudební Fond

- Karl Kroeger (b. 1932)

Sonata for viola and piano (1951); American Composers Alliance

- Franz Krommer (1759–1831)

13 Pieces for 2 clarinets and viola, Op. 47
Sonata in D major for violin with viola accompaniment, Op. 27
Sonata in A major for violin with viola accompaniment, Op. 29
Sonata for violin with viola accompaniment, Op. 42
Sonata in F major for viola, cello and piano, Op. 32 (1802); also seen as Op. 34

- Gail Kubik (1914–1984)

Symphony Concertante for trumpet, viola, piano and orchestra (1952, revised 1953); Ricordi

- Ladislav Kubík (1946–2017)

Sonata for viola solo (1978); Český Hudební Fond

- Augustin Kubizek (1918–2009)

Concerto for viola and orchestra, Op. 48 (1980)
Es liegt ein Schloß in Österreich, Variations for viola (or clarinet, or violin, or cello) and orchestra, Op. 43c (1982); Verlag Doblinger
Kleine Suite (Little Suite) for violin and viola, Op. 5 No. 2 (1953); Verlag Doblinger
Sonatine for viola (or clarinet or cello) and piano, Op. 5 No. 1 (1953); Verlag Doblinger

- Joseph Küffner (1776–1856)

Concerto in A major for viola and orchestra, Op. 139 (1823)
Divertissement in F major for horn or viola and piano, Op. 231 (1831)
Potpourri in D major for viola and orchestra, Op. 57 (1816)

- Michael Kugel (b. 1946)

Il Carnevale di Venezia for viola and piano (2001); Alain Van Kerckhoven Éditeur
Classical Preludes for viola and piano (1999); Alain Van Kerckhoven Éditeur
Sonata-Poem for viola solo (1987); Alain Van Kerckhoven Éditeur
Suite in Memoriam Shostakovich for viola and piano (1988); Alain Van Kerckhoven Éditeur

- Claus Kühnl (b. 1957)

Gewendete Figur for flute(s), viola and double bass (2003)
Morceau '95 for viola and piano (1995); Friedrich Hofmeister Musikverlag

- Felicitas Kukuck (1914–2001)

Aus tiefer Not schrei ich zu dir (1964); Hänssler-Verlag Stuttgart

1. Partita for viola and organ (or piano)
2. Geistliches Konzert (Sacred Concerto) for baritone, viola, organ and chorus

Der 6. Psalm (Psalm 6), Cantata for tenor and viola (1991)
Der 13. Psalm (Psalm 13), Cantata for tenor and viola (1991)
Die Tänze der Mirjam (The Dances of Miriam), 10 Dances for viola solo (1988); Furore Edition
Fantasie for viola and piano (1951); Möseler Verlag; Schott Music
Volkslieder-Variationen (Folk Song Variations) for viola and piano (1942)
Zaubersprüche, Cantata for female voice, viola and piano (c.1955)

- Hanna Kulenty (b. 1961)

A Fourth Circle for viola (or violin, or cello) and piano (1994); Donemus

- Gary Kulesha (b. 1954)

"...and dark time flowed by her like a river..." for viola (or violin, or cello) and piano (1993); Canadian Music Centre
Concerto for viola and chamber orchestra (1992)

- Friedrich August Kummer (1797–1879)

Fantaisie sur les motifs de l'opéra "Lucia di Lammermoor" de G. Donizetti for cello or viola and piano, Op. 68 (1841)

- Kaspar Kummer (1795–1870)

Trio in C major for flute, viola (or violin) and piano, Op. 75 (1832)
Sérénade in D major for flute, viola (or violin) and guitar, Op. 81 (1835)
Sérénade in C major for flute, viola (or violin) and guitar, Op. 83 (1835)

- Pierre Kunc (1865–1941)

Rapsodie for viola and piano (1940); Éditions Max Eschig
Sonata in B minor for viola and piano (or orchestra) (1919–1921); Buffet-Crampon

- Luigi von Kunits (1870–1931)

Sonata for viola and piano (1917)

- Meyer Kupferman (1926–2003)

Among the Windy Places for violin, viola and bassoon (1994); Soundspells Productions
Aspen Duo for trumpet and viola (1982); Soundspells Productions; Subito Music
Concerto for Six Instruments (flute, oboe, horn, violin, viola and cello) and Orchestra (1978)
Duo Arsenalas for flute and viola (1996)
Icarus for viola, cello and guitar (1976)
Ich Bin der Eine for speaker and viola (1984); words by Stefan George
Image I for clarinet and viola (1984); Soundspells Productions
Image II for clarinet and viola (1985); Soundspells Productions
Image of the Third Garden for clarinet and viola (1986); Soundspells Productions
Infinities No. 2 for viola solo
A Little Bit for clarinet and viola (1988); Soundspells Productions
Little Fantasy for viola and piano (1980); General Music Publishing
Phantom Episodes for clarinet and viola (1989); Soundspells Productions
Phantom Sonata for viola and piano (1979); Soundspells Productions
Poetics No. 6 for clarinet, viola and piano (1983)
Quiet Play for viola and piano (1987); Soundspells Productions; Subito Music
Romanza d'Amore for viola and double bass (1986); Soundspells Productions
Serenade for guitar and viola (1995); Soundspells Productions
Sound Objects No. 8 for clarinet, viola and double bass (1978)
Sound Phantoms No. 1 "On Beauty and the Beast" for viola and piano (1979)
Two for One for viola solo (1990); Soundspells Productions; Subito Music

- Giedrius Kuprevičius (b. 1944)

Pirmieji šeši žodžiai arba viskas iš vandens (The Six First Words or All from Aquatic) for flute, viola and piano (2006)
Maži pokalbiai (Small Conversations) for violin and viola (1994); Lithuanian Music Information and Publishing Centre

- György Kurtág (b. 1926)

...Concertante... for violin solo, viola solo and orchestra, Op. 42 (2003); winner of the 2006 Grawemeyer Award for Music Composition; Editio Musica Budapest
Concerto for viola and orchestra (1954); Editio Musica Budapest
Hommage à R. Sch. for clarinet (also bass drum), viola and piano, Op. 15d (1990); Editio Musica Budapest
Jelek (Signs) for viola, Op. 5 (1961; revised 1992); Editio Musica Budapest
Jelek, játékok és üzenetek (Signs, Games and Messages) for viola solo (1961, 1987, 1992–2001; revised 1991–2005); Editio Musica Budapest
Jelek, játékok és üzenetek (Signs, Games and Messages) for string duo (2 violas; viola and violin, or cello, or double bass) (1983, 1986, 1990–2006; revised 1991, 1993, 2003); Editio Musica Budapest
Tétel (Movement) for viola and orchestra (1953–1954); Editio Musica Budapest

- Bronius Kutavičius (1932–2021)

Ant kranto (On the Shore) for soprano and 4 violas (1972); words by Jonas Mekas; Vaga, Vilnius; Lithuanian Music Information and Publishing Centre
Sonata for viola and piano (1968); Sovetsky Kompozitor; Edition Peters

- Mati Kuulberg (1947–2001)

Viis eesti rahvaviisi (Five Estonian Folk Tunes; Fünf estnische Volksweisen) for clarinet, viola and double bass (1969, 1988); Bella Musica; Antes Edition; Edition 49

- Vyacheslav Kuznetsov (b. 1955)

Capriccio (Капрыччио) for viola solo (1988)
Heterophony (Гетэрафонія) for oboe, violin and viola (1993)

- Johan Kvandal (1919–1999)

Elegi og Capriccio (Elegy and Capriccio) for viola solo, Op. 47 (1977); Norsk Musikforlag
Sonata "Elgsonaten" (The Elk Sonata) for viola and piano, Op. 81 (1995); Norsk Musikforlag

- Jaroslav Kvapil (1892–1958)

Duo for violin and viola (1949)
Suita (Suite) for viola and chamber orchestra (1955); Český Hudební Fond

- Otomar Kvěch (1950–2018)

Haiku o Praze (Haiku of Prague), Melodrama for recitor and viola (or violin) (2007); words by Karel Trinkewitz
Missa con Viola Obligata for mixed chorus, viola solo, percussion and organ (1998)
Sonata for viola and piano (1989); Český Hudební Fond

- Yannis Kyriakides (b. 1969)

Four Maggots for viola and double bass (1992)
