= Elmo Tiisvald =

Estonian conductor

Elmo Tiisvald (born 13 June 1967) is an Estonian conductor born in Tallinn. He started his music studies at the Tallinn Music High School in the violin class of Tiiu Peäske and continued his studies, violin with Lemmo Erendi and choral conducting with Enn Oja, at the Tallinn Georg Ots Music School.

He has been involved at the Estonian Boys Choir for many years as a choir singer and soloist. From 1977 to 1979 he sang the title role of Britten's The Little Sweep at the Estonian National Opera.

Tiisvald has graduated from the Estonian Academy of Music both as a choral conductor (class of Prof. Ants Üleoja) in 1993, and orchestra conductor (class of Prof. Paul Mägi and Prof. Roman Matsov) in 2003. Elmo Tiisvald has attended master courses with John Eliot Gardiner and Helmuth Rilling at the Stuttgart Bach Academy and participated in several masterclasses with Jorma Panula, Neeme Järvi and Sylvain Cambreling.

In 1992–1995, Tiisvald worked as a singer, chorus master and conductor of Estonian Philharmonic Chamber Choir and a lecturer at the Estonian Academy of Music. In 1995, Tiisvald started his work as the assistant conductor of the Symphony Orchestra of Estonian NO and a chief chorus master at the same opera company (1998 – 2009). During the period of 1991–2009, Tiisvald was the music supervisor of more than thirty oratorical works, about thirty five operas, four operettas and six musicals. Tiisvald has conducted operas, ballets and musicals at the Estonian NO and at numerous music festivals in Estonia, Russia and Germany. Tiisvald has worked with the Estonian National SO, Pärnu City Orchestra, Tallinn Baroque Orchestra, Estonian Philharmonic Chamber Choir, Mixed Choir of Estonian Radio, Estonian National Male Choir, Oratorio Choir and the Opera Choir of the Estonian National Opera.

He has worked for the second time from 2013 to 2021, chief chorus master of Estonian NO, while continuing to work as a lecturer in the faculty of conducting and the artistic director and conductor of Opera Studio at Estonian Academy of Music and Theatre. In 2014, Elmo Tiisvald was nominated as candidate for the Conductor of the Year Music Award.

Currently, Elmo Tiisvald works as a lecturer in the conducting department and opera studio of the Estonian Academy of Music and Theatre. In addition, Elmo Tiisvald contributes to the training of young musicians in music theory, jazz theory and music technology at the orchestra Nissi Trollid Music School. From 2021, he teaches orchestration and arranging in Helsinki. Since 2023, he has also been a music history and music theory lecturer at three leading music schools in Estonia. Elmo Tiisvald he founded Nissi Church Music Festival in 2021 and he is its artistic director today.

== Recordings ==
- Enchanted operetta - Margit Saulep & Urmas Põldma - Pärnu City Orchestra, CD - conductor
- Olav Ehala: musical Arabella Birgitta Festival, Estonian Youth Symphony Orchestra, Tallinn Concert Choir, Maria Soomets (Arabella), Hannes Kaljujärv (Taaniel Tina), Rain Simul (Hasso), Andero Ermel (Halleluuja), Veiko Tubin (Adalbert), Priit Volmer (Raudpats), Tatjana Mihhailova (Rosita), Mart Toome (Haak), Priit Kruusement (Meremõrtsukas), Mart Toome (Martsipan), Olari Viikholm (Suur Aadam), Aare Kodasmaa (Väike Aadam), Mati Vaikmaa (Puujalg), CD - conductor
- Voices of the Estonian National Opera, CD – chorusmaster
- Erkki-Sven Tüür: opera Wallenberg, DVD – chorusmaster
- Cyrillus Kreek: Requiem, CD – chorusmaster
- Henry Purcell: Ode for St. Cecilias Day “Welcome to all the pleasures” Tallinn Baroque Orchestra and Concert Choir, CD - conductor
- Henry Purcell: opera Dido and Aeneas, CD – conductor
- The King Arthur's Opera Gala, DVD – chorusmaster
- Tauno Pylkkänen: opera Mare and her Son, CD – chorusmaster
- Rudolf Tobias: oratorio Jonah's Mission, 300 Years of St. Peterburg, DVD – chorusmaster
- Olav Ehala: family musical Bumpy, DVD – conductor
- A. S. Dargomõžski (ru): opera Mermaid, VHS – chorusmaster
- Eino Tamberg: opera Cyrano de Bergeraque, CD, VHS – assistant conductor
- Verdi: opera Nabucco, DVD, CD – chorusmaster
- Rauno Remme: Voices, Cor mundum, CD – conductor
- Mari Vihmand: Chamber Music Album, Estonian National Broadcasting – conductor
