= Trio of flute, viola and harp =

The trio of flute, viola and harp is a standard chamber music ensemble. It was first popularized by a work by Claude Debussy in 1915, namely the Sonata for Flute, Viola and Harp, L. 137. The earliest known composition for this trio is the Terzettino by Théodore Dubois (1905).

This trio has gained popularity partly due to its unique timbre: with its arco (bowed) and pizzicato abilities, the viola bridges the gap between the smooth flute sound and plucked harp tones.

There are also musical ensembles containing this instrumentation.

== Early works for flute, viola and harp ==
The earliest two works composed for flute, viola, and harp are Théodore Dubois's Terzettino (1905) and Claude Debussy's Sonata for Flute, Viola and Harp (1915). The Terzettino is a relatively short work in one movement lasting approximately five minutes, and its main theme is a lyrical, romantic-style melody. Considered to be a beautiful work because of its simplicity and elegant style, the Terzettino is sometimes programmed alongside Debussy's trio to showcase the contrast between the two. Written ten years after the Terzettino, Debussy's famous sonata for these instruments is a multi-movement work that explores less-traditional tonalities and a wider range of emotions through its ethereal, transparent sound and careful interplay between the instrumental voices. Originally composed for flute, oboe, and harp, Debussy changed the planned instrumentation of his trio to make use of the viola's more flexible timbre that unifies the harp and flute sounds. Debussy's trio for flute, viola and harp is known a staple for the ensemble and the model that inspired other composers to write for the same instrumentation. Both of these early works for flute, viola and harp demonstrate the ensemble's unique sound, paving the way for numerous trios by various composers in the twentieth and twenty-first centuries.

== List of flute, viola and harp groups ==
- Aglica Trio (United Kingdom)
- Astralis Chamber Ensemble (United States)
- Auréole (United States)
- Aurora Trio (United Kingdom)
- Auros Trio (Germany)
- Beau Soir Ensemble (Washington, D.C.)
- Bohemia Luxembourg Trio (Luxembourg)
- Cosmos Trio (United States)
- Debussy Trio (United States)
- Debussy Ensemble (United Kingdom)
- Deciduous Trio (United States)
- ensemble infini (Japan)
- Ensemble Transparent (Finland)
- Fire Pink Trio (United States)
- Formosa Trio (Indiana, USA)
- Giverny Trio (New Zealand)
- janus trio (Brooklyn, NY)
- La Mer Trio (United Kingdom)
- Lorien Trio (Poland)
- Los Angeles Harp Trio (United States)
- Mauris Ensemble (Poland)
- Midnight Rose Trio (United States)
- MirAnDa Trio (Netherlands)
- Myriad Trio (United States)
- Naiades Ensemble (United Kingdom)
- New York Harp Trio (United States)
- Pelléas Ensemble (United Kingdom)
- Trilogy Ensemble (United Kingdom)
- Trio Alexander (United States)
- Trio Anima (Great Britain)
- Trio Arcane (Switzerland)
- Trio Charolca (Germany)
- Trio Couleurs (Netherlands)
- Trio Beau Soir (Québec, Canada)
- Trio BECEL (Belgium)
- Trio Lyra (Canada)
- Trio Farben (United Kingdom)
- Trio Mallarmé (Germany)
- Trio Medicis (Belgium)
- Trio Momentum (Germany, Italy, Japan)
- Trio Notturno (United States)
- Trio Sospiroso (United Kingdom)
- Trio Spiritus (France)
- Trio Verlaine (Canada)
- Triolet (Italy)
- Turner Trio (France)

== Selected works for flute, viola and harp ==
For standard flute, viola and harp unless otherwise noted

Composer	Title	Publisher
Samuel Adler (b. 1928)	Triolet (1989)	C.F. Peters
Miguel del Águila (b. 1957)	Submerged (2014)	self published
Luna Alcalay (1928–2012)	un sogno à tre (1990)	Music Information Centre Austria
Jan Bach (b. 1937)	Five Penny Poems for mezzo-soprano, flute, viola and harp (2005)	Meadow Music; words by Penny Walker Bosselmann
Henk Badings (1907–1987)	Trio No. 10 for alto flute, viola, and harp (1977)	Donemus
Sándor Balassa (1935–2021)	Fűzérke (Little Garland), Op. 51 (1994)	
Claude Ballif (1924–2004)	Trio, Op. 43 No. 1 (1969)	Éditions Choudens
Milton Barnes (1931–2001)	Classical Cat (1999)	Canadian Music Centre
Milton Barnes (1931–2001)	Harbord Street (1991)	Canadian Music Centre
Milton Barnes (1931–2001)	Tango 99 (2000)	Canadian Music Centre
Pierre Bartholomée (b. 1937)	Et j'ai vu l'âme sur un fil...elle dansait (2000)	Quindicesima Publishing
Arnold Bax (1883–1953)	Elegiac Trio (1916)	Chester Music Ltd.
Sally Beamish (b. 1956)	Between Earth and Sea (1997)	Scottish Music Centre
Louis-Noël Belaubre (b. 1932)	Les Romances de Gai Savoir, Op. 37	Louis-Noël Belaubre
Paul Ben-Haim (1897–1984)	Chamber Music (מוסיקה קאמרית) (1978)	Israeli Music Publications
Richard Rodney Bennett (1936–2012)	Sonata after Syrinx (1985)	Novello & Co. Ltd.
Moisès Bertran (b. 1967)	Sonatina líquida (2006)	Clivis Publicacions
Harrison Birtwistle (b. 1934)	Dinah and Nick's Love Song (1994)	Universal Editions
Herbert Blendinger (b. 1936)	Tre Impressioni (3 Impressions) for flute (bass flute), viola and harp, Op. 26 (1976)	Orlando-Musikverlag
Konrad Boehmer (1941–2014)	Nuba (1998)	Tonos Musikverlags
Jacques Bondon	Le Soleil multicolore (1970)	Éditions Max Eschig
Cesar Bresgen	Concetti (1974)	
Salvador Brotons (b. 1959)	Ad Infinitum (1976, revised 1991)	Clivis Publicacions
David Bruce (b. 1970)	The Eye of Night (2011)	Red Balloon Music
Linda Buckley (b. 1979)	all collisions end in static (2003)	
Jeremy Cavaterra (b. 1971)	Trio (2012)	
Carlos Chávez (1899–1978)	Trio (1940)	
Brian Cherney (b. 1942)	Music for a Summer Wedding (2000)	Canadian Music Centre
Anna Clyne (b. 1980)	Beware Of (2007)	
Tristan Coelho (b. 1983)	Hokusai Mixtape: for flute, viola, harp and live electronics (2021)	Australian Music Centre
Barry Conyngham (b. 1944)	Streams (1988)	Australian Music Centre
Jean-Michel Damase (1928–2013)	Trio (1947)	Éditions Henry Lemoine
Jean-Luc Darbellay (b. 1946)	Asia (2008)	Tre Media Musikverlage
Matthew Davidson (b. 1964)	Trio Sonata (2012)	American Composers Alliance
Claude Debussy (1862–1918)	Sonata, L. 137 (1915)	
Caspar Diethelm (1926–1997)	Jadis, Ballet Suite, Op. 297 (1993)	
Stephen Dodgson (1924–2013)	Solway Suite (1974)	Stephen Dodgson Charitable Trust
Franco Donatoni (1927–2000)	Small II (1993)	Ricordi
Théodore Dubois (1837–1924)	Terzettino in E♭ major (1905)	Éditions Heugel; Ut Orpheus Edizioni
Joël-François Durand (b. 1954)	Le Tombeau de Rameau (2008)	Éditions Musicales Européennes
Ross Edwards (b. 1943)	Mobile (1965)	Australian Music Centre
Andrea Ferrante (b. 1968)	Il petalo blu (2010)	
Michael Finnissy (b. 1946)	Untitled Piece in Memory of Igor Stravinsky (1971)	Tre Media Musikverlage
Bjørn Fongaard (1919–1980)	Trio (1971)	Music Information Centre Norway
Malcolm Forsyth (b. 1936)	Intimacies (1977, 2000)	Counterpoint Music Library Services; Canadian Music Centre
Dorothea Franchi	Suite	
Isadore Freed (1900–1960)	Trio (1940)	
Harry Freedman (1922–2005)	Touchpoints (1994)	Canadian Music Centre
Sean Friar (b. 1985)	Two Solitudes (2014)	
Fritz Geißler (1921–1984)	Trio (1979)	
Harald Genzmer (1909–2007)	Trio (1947)	C.F. Peters
Giorgio Federico Ghedini (1892–1965)	Concertato (1941)	Rugginenti Editore
Srul Irving Glick (1934–2002)	Trio (1988)	Canadian Music Centre
Sofia Gubaidulina (b. 1931)	Garten von Freuden und Traurigkeiten (The Garden of Joys and Sorrows) for flute, viola, harp and narrator (1980)	
Daron Hagen (b. 1961)	Harp Trio (1988–1989)	E.C. Schirmer Publishing
Adolphus Hailstork (b. 1941)	As Falling Leaves (2002)	Theodore Presser Company
Lars Hegaard (b. 1950)	13 Short Pieces (1990)	Edition Samfundet
Philippe Hersant (b. 1948)	Trio (2000)	
Philippe Hersant (b. 1948)	Trois Nocturnes (2001)	Éditions Durand
Airat Ichmouratov (b. 1973)	Fujin's Dream (2018)	Canadian Music Centre
Gabriel Jackson (b. 1962)	Lunae glaciales for piccolo (flute), viola and harp (1996, revised 1999)	
Stephen Jaffe (b. 1954)	Offering (1998)	Theodore Presser Company
Pertti Jalava (b. 1960)	While You Were Sleeping, I opened the Door... (2010)	
André Jolivet (1905–1974)	Petite suite (1941)	Éditions Musicales Transatlantiques
Georg Katzer (1935–2019)	Mi (1987)	
Nigel Keay (b. 1955)	Terrestrial Mirror (2004)	Centre for New Zealand Music
Rudolf Kelterborn (1931–2021)	Monodie II (1977–1990)	Hug Musikverlage
Michael Kibbe (b. 1945)	Trio, Op. 99 (1989)	Fatrock Ink Music
Valeri Kikta (b. 1941)	Nocturne (Ноктюрн) (1979)	
Valeri Kikta (b. 1941)	Trio in Honor of M. N. Yermolova (Трио в честь М. Н. Ермоловой) (1985)	
Herman David Koppel (1908–1998)	Patchwork, Op. 106 (1981)	Edition Samfundet
Libby Larsen (b. 1950)	Trio in Four Movements (2005)	Libby Larsen
Marc Lavry (1903–1967)	Suite concertante, Op. 348 (1966)	
Henri Lazarof (1932–2013)	Harp Trio "The Litomar" (2004)	Merion Music; Theodore Presser Company
René Leibowitz (1913–1972)	Sonatina, Op. 69 (1966)	Mobart Music
John Anthony Lennon (b. 1950)	Serpent (2007)	Fatrock Ink Music Publishers
Fred Lerdahl (b. 1943)	Imitations (6 Études) (1979)	Mobart Music
Ulrich Leyendecker (b. 1946)	Sonata (1988)	Hans Sikorski
Malcolm Lipkin (b. 1932)	Trio (1982)	
Jonathan Lloyd (b. 1948)	Like Fallen Angels (1986)	Boosey & Hawkes
Dan Locklair (b. 1949)	Dream Steps, Dance Suite (1993)	Subito Music
Alain Louvier (b. 1945)	Envols d'écailles (1987)	Éditions Alphonse Leduc
Ami Maayani (b. 1936)	Improvisation variée (1966)	
Ami Maayani (b. 1936)	Trio (1969); revision of Improvisation variée	Lyra Music Co.
Ami Maayani (b. 1936)	Serenade, Op. 25 (1980); arrangement of Beethoven's Serenade for flute, violin and viola in D major (1801)	Lyra Music Co.
Andrew MacDonald (b. 1958)	Pleiades Variations, Op. 45 (1998)	Canadian Music Centre
Andrew March (b. 1973)	Dragonfly (2001; 2016)	Alea Publishing and Recording
Mètres (1972)	Éditions Musicales Transatlantiques	
Philip Martin (b. 1947)	Fantasy "Footfalls Echo in the Memory" (2008)	
William Mathias (1934–1992)	Zodiac Trio (1975)	Oxford University Press
Siegfried Matthus (1934–2021)	Trio (1971)	Breitkopf & Härtel; Deutscher Verlag für Musik
Arne Mellnäs (1933–2002)	Dagsfärd och natthärbärge, 3 Songs for soprano, flute, viola and harp (1959)	words by Ella Hillbäck; Swedish Music Information Centre
Gregory Mertl (b. 1969)	Madra's Musings (2005)	Four Glimpses Music
Arthur Meulemans (1884–1966)	Sonate (1948)	CeBeDeM
Krzysztof Meyer (b. 1943)	Hommage à Nadia Boulanger, Op. 17 (1971; new version 1991)	Wydawnictwo Muzyczne Agencji Autorskiej
Darius Milhaud (1892–1974)	Adieu, Cantata for voice, flute, viola and harp, Op. 410 (1964)	words by Arthur Rimbaud; Elkan-Vogel Co.
Marjan Mozetich (b. 1948)	Goodbye My Friend (2002)	Canadian Music Centre
Marjan Mozetich (b. 1948)	A Veiled Dream (1977)	Canadian Music Centre
Jan Müller-Wieland (b. 1966)	Drei Gedichte von Birgit Feusthuber for mezzo-soprano, flute, viola and harp (1996)	Hans Sikorski
Lior Navok (b. 1971)	Veiled Echoes (2000)	Lior Navok Music
Maria Newman (b. 1960)	The Pied Piper	Maria Newman
Tage Nielsen (1929–2003)	Salon (1984)	Edition Samfundet
Per Nørgård (1932–2025)	Billet Doux à Madame C. for alto flute, viola and harp (2005)	Edition Wilhelm Hansen
Emmanuel Nunes (1941–2012)	Impromptu pour un voyage II (1974–1975)	Éditions Jobert
Eoin O'Keeffe (b. 1979)	Trio and Over Again (2005)	Contemporary Music Centre Ireland
Vivienne Olive (b. 1950)	And the Willows Drowse and Sleep (2002)	Furore Verlag
Roman Palester (1907–1989)	Trio (1985)	
Yiannis Papaioannou (1910–1989)	Night (Νυχτερινό) (1937)	
Yiannis Papaioannou (1910–1989)	Pastorale (Παστοράλε) (1938)	
Yiannis Papaioannou (1910–1989)	Romanesca (Ρομανέσκα) (1938)	
Ödön Pártos (1907–1977)	Invenzione a tre, Homage to Debussy (1977)	Israel Music Institute
Robert Paterson (b. 1970)	Embracing The Wind (1999)	Bill Holab Music
Walter Piston (1894–1976)	Souvenir (1967)	Associated Music
Matan Porat (b. 1982)	Horo (2010)	Matan Porat
Teresa Procaccini (b. 1934)	Trio, Op. 124 (1990)	Edizioni Edi-Pan
Bernard Rands (b. 1934)	"...sans voix parmi les voix..." (1995)	Helicon Music Corporation
Günter Raphael (1903–1960)	Sonatina, Op. 65 No. 1 (1948)	Breitkopf & Härtel
Alan Rawsthorne (1905–1971)	Suite (1968)	Oxford University Press
Karel Reiner (1910–1979)	Repliky (Replicas) (1973)	Český Hudební Fond
Michèle Reverdy (b. 1943)	Les Jeux de Protée (1984)	Éditions Salabert
Marga Richter (1926-2020)	Düsseldorf Concerto for flute, viola, harp and small orchestra (1981–1982)	
Dennis Riley (b. 1943)	Apparitions (1983-1984)	C. F. Peters
Niels Rosing-Schow (b. 1954)	Spectre du temps (2004)	Edition Wilhelm Hansen
Niels Rosing-Schow (b. 1954)	Trio (1983)	Edition Wilhelm Hansen
Rudolf Růžička (b. 1941)	Trio (1963)	Rudolf Růžička at the Czech Music Information Centre
Osmo Tapio Räihälä (b. 1964)	Corpi celesti (2020)	Hans Sikorski
Kaija Saariaho (1952-2023)	New Gates (1996)	Chester Music Ltd.
Timothy Salter (b. 1942)	Mosaics for flute (optionally doubling piccolo), viola and harp (1991)	Usk Edition
Rhian Samuel (b. 1944)	Through Windows and the Balustrades Beyond (1998)	Stainer & Bell
Bogusław Schaeffer (b. 1929)	Trio for flute, viola, harp and tape (1966)	
Martin Schlumpf (b. 1947)	Trio (1970)	Martin Schlumpf
Gary Schocker (b. 1959)	Go To Sleep (2000)	Theodore Presser Company
Gary Schocker (b. 1959)	Summer Morning, Summer Afternoon (2006)	Falls House Press
Aleksandr Shymko (b. 1977)	The Book of Night Secrets (Книга таємниць ночі) (2005)	Aleksandr Shymko
Leo Smit (1900–1943)	Trio (1926)	Donemus
Johannes Maria Staud (b. 1974)	Sydenham Music (2007)	
Ben Steinberg (b. 1930)	Suite (1981)	Canadian Music Centre
Ben Steinberg (b. 1930)	Three Songs (1975)	Canadian Music Centre
David Stock (b. 1939)	A Vanished World (1999)	MMB Music
Atli Heimir Sveinsson (b. 1938)	Springsongs I-IV and Minning (Manuela in Memoriam) (2006)	Iceland Music Information Centre
Atli Heimir Sveinsson (b. 1938)	Minning II (Manuela in Memoriam) for bass flute, viola and harp (2006)	Iceland Music Information Centre
Toru Takemitsu (1930–1996)	And Then I Knew 'Twas Wind (1992)	Schott Japan
Hilary Tann (b. 1947)	From the Song of Amergin (1997)	Oxford University Press
Jiří Teml (b. 1935)	Dvě folklórní studie (2 Folklore Studies) (1999)	Český Hudební Fond
Jiří Teml (b. 1935)	Zelená flétna (The Green Flute), Melodrama on Verses of Miroslav Florian for reciter, flute, viola and harp (1983)	
Johannes Paul Thilman (1906–1973)	Aspekte	Edition Peters
George Tsontakis (b. 1951)	Lullaby of Crete for soprano, flute, viola and harp (1999)	
Dmitri Tymoczko (b. 1969)	Cathedral (2005)	
Chinary Ung (b. 1942)	Child-Song (Version III) for alto flute, viola and harp (1985)	C.F. Peters
Janika Vandervelde (b. 1955)	Genesis III (1985)	
Giulio Viozzi (1912–1984)	Trio (1960)	Edizioni Musicali G. Zanibon
Hans Vogt (1911–1992)	Trio (1951, 1989)	
Mieczysław Weinberg (1919-1996)	Trio, Op. 127 (1979)	peermusic
James Wilson (1922–2005)	Consequences, Op. 169 (2004)	
René Wohlhauser (b. 1954)	Quantenströmung (Quantum Current), Ergon 23 (1996)	Édition Musicale Suisse
Benjamin Yusupov (b. 1962)	But in Vain, Op. 44 (1997)	Hans Sikorski
Eric Zeisl (1905–1959)	Arrowhead, Trio (1956)	Doblinger Verlag

== See also ==
- Chamber music
