= Sulkhan Tsintsadze =

Georgian Composer

- სულხან ცინცაძე
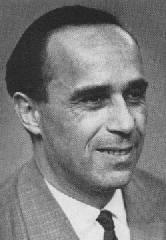
- Born: August 23, 1925; Gori, Transcaucasian SSR, Soviet Union
- Died: November 15, 1991 (aged 66); Tbilisi, Georgia
- Occupations: Music director, Composer
- Organizations: Tbilisi Opera and Ballet Theatre, Georgian State Symphony Orchestra, Tbilisi Center for Music and Culture, Tbilisi Symphony Orchestra
- Awards: People's Artist of the Georgian SSR (1961)

Sulkhan Tevdores dze Tsintsadze (Georgian: სულხან თევდორეს ძე ცინცაძე; Russian: Сулхан Фёдорович Цинцадзе, romanized: Sulkhan Fyodorovich Tsintsadze; August 23, 1925 – November 15, 1991) was a Georgian composer known for his chamber music and his film scores.

== Early life and education ==
Tsintsadze was born in Gori, Georgia, in 1925. When he was seven years old, the family moved to Tbilisi, where his father, Fyodor, was appointed chief inspector of the Transcaucasus for sheep breeding. There, Tsintsadze began taking cello lessons with First Musical Gymnasium professor E. N. Kapelnitsky, though on the basis of his talent, he was soon transferred to the Tbilisi State Conservatory’s new department for gifted children to continue studies with Kapelnitsky. In 1937, Fyodor Tsintsadze was arrested as part of the Great Purge.

In 1942, Tsintsadze began formal studies in the orchestra department of the Tbilisi State Conservatory with cellist Konstantin Minyar-Beloruchev, who died in January 1944. While enrolled at the conservatory, Tsintsadze also played in the GSSR State Symphony Orchestra. He was also the founding cellist of the original State String Quartet of Georgia, of which he was a member from 1944 to 1946.

From 1945 to 1953, Tsintsadze attended the Moscow State Tchaikovsky Conservatory, where he studied cello with Semyon Matveyevich Kozolupov until 1950 and composition with Semyon Bogatyryov until 1953.

== Career ==
The young Tsintsadze was spotted by fellow Georgian composer Nikolai Narimanidze, who saw him as the future of Georgian national music at a time when the Soviet Union emphasized the contributions of national minority composers. In 1949, Tsintsadze presented to the Union of Russian composers his second string quartet, two viola pieces (including one based upon the khorumi, a southwestern Georgian war dance), and romance settings of poetry by Aleksandr Pushkin. The committee’s preference for the former two pieces, which incorporated elements of Georgian folk music, was borne out by praised bestowed upon him by Genrik Litinsky and Vladimir Fere, who saw his talent as far above those of other Georgian composers whose music they had heard.

The reception of his music, particularly his second string quartet, was largely positive. Because of his adherence to the Soviet ideals of socialist realism through bright writing and a distinctly folk-influenced style, Tsintsadze enjoyed a positive reputation among Soviet-affiliated elites. His third string quartet, auditioned for the composers’ union in 1951, incorporated elements of 19th-century Russian compositional practice, as several compositional mentors had advised him to do. This melding of Georgian national idioms and Russian history played favorably into the ideals of the Friendship of the Peoples, a Soviet social movement intended to celebrate diversity within the umbrella of the state. The work does not use specific Georgian folk melodies, though its fourth movement incorporates the lezginka, a Caucasian dance popular in Jewish communities around Dagestan.

Musicologist Tamara Livanova and composers Vano Muradeli, Mieczysław Weinberg, and Aram Khachaturian all felt that the third string quartet marked an important advancement in both Tsintsadze’s personal style and in the creation of a distinctly Georgian identity within Soviet classical music. Narimanidze, however, felt that the music had strayed too far from the Georgian idiom that had initially attracted him to Tsintsadze’s sound.

In his later string quartets, Tsintsadze experimented with polyphony and dissonance, both essential components of Georgian folk music, as well as with form. His sixth string quartet, written in 1967, features a single movement divided into five sections, while his tenth string quartet, written in 1984, is subtitled “Polyphonical” to reflect its extensive counterpoint. Tsintsadze’s other compositional influences included Vissarion Shebalin and Dmitri Shostakovich.

Tsintsadze also composed a number of film scores during the 1950s and 1960s, including those for The Dragonfly (1954), Bashi-Achuki (1956), A Woman’s Burden (1958), Maia Tskneteli (1959), and A Soldier’s Father (1964). After his death, his music also featured in the television series Oqros oboba.

Tsintsadze’s most famous solo piano work is his 24 Preludes for Piano, written in 1971 for the Georgian pianist Roman Gorelashvili, who edited the set and recorded it in 1972. He wrote a separate set of 24 preludes for cello and piano in 1980.

Tsintsadze taught an orchestration class at the Tbilisi State Conservatory from 1963 and became a professor of orchestration from 1973; between 1965 and 1984, he was the rector of the conservatory. His orchestration and composition students included Nino Janjgava, a Georgian composer who won third prize in the 1986 young composers’ competition in Moscow.

After leaving his post as rector, Tsintsadze was the chairman of the Union of Composers of Georgia from 1984 to 1991 and was also a member of the Georgian SSR’s Union of Cinematography.

Tsintsadze was awarded the People's Artist of Georgia (1961) and People's Artist of the USSR (1988) titles, the USSR Stalin Prize (1950) for his Quartet No. 2 and his 3 Miniatures, and the Zakharia Paliashvili Prize (1974) and Shota Rustaveli Prize (1981) from the Georgian government.

== Personal life ==
Tsintsadze died in Tbilisi on September 15, 1991—the year that he completed his 12th string quartet. He is buried in the Didube Pantheon in Tbilisi.

Tsintsadze’s son Irakli, born 1964, is a composer in his own right who studied at the Tbilisi State Conservatory from 1976 to 1986, while his father was rector, and later with Theo Brandmüller. He now teaches analysis and polyphony at the Tbilisi State Academy of Arts.

He died in November 1991.

== Compositions ==
Concerti

Cello Concerto No. 1 (1947)

Violin Concerto No. 1 (1947)

Piano Concerto No. 1 after Georgian Themes (1949)

Fantasy for piano and orchestra (revision of Piano Concerto No. 1) (1949)

Fantasy for piano and orchestra (1954)

Cello Concerto No. 2 (1964)

Violin Concerto No. 2 (1967)

Piano Concerto No. 2 (1968)

Cello Concerto No. 3 (1973)

Concertino for cello and orchestra (1976)

Fantasy for string quartet and orchestra (1977)

Orchestral music

Symphony No. 1 (1952)

Symphony No. 2 (1963)

Symphony No. 3 (1969)

Twenty-Four Preludes for violin, celesta, piano, bells and chamber orchestra (1978)

Symphony No. 4 (1979)

Chamber music

Three Miniatures for string quartet (1945)

1. Lale

2. Indi-Mindi

3. Sachidao

String Quartet No. 1 (1947)

Two Pieces for viola and piano (1948)

Khorumi, Georgian Dance

Romance

String Quartet No. 2 (1948)

Five Pieces on Folk Themes for cello and piano (1950) Duration: 10'

1. Villain's Song on a Carriage

2. Tchonguri (Chonguri)

3. Sachidao

4. Nana

5. Dance Tune

String Quartet No. 3 (1951)

Suite for string quartet (1951)

String Quartet No. 4 (1955)

Suite No. 3 for string quartet (1955)

Seventeen Miniatures for string quartet (1961)

String Quartet No. 5 (1962)

Georgian Melodies for cello and piano (1967)

String Quartet No. 6 (1967)

String Quartet No. 7 "To the Memory of Bela Bartok" (1970)

Five Romances after Pjotr Grusinsky for high voice and piano (1974)

String Quartet No. 8 (1974)

String Quartet No. 9 (1978); dedicated to the memory of Dmitri Shostakovich

Twelve Miniatures for string quartet (1978)

Twelve Children Songs after Chuta Berulav for voice and piano (1979)

Twenty-Four Preludes for cello and piano (1980)

String Quartet No. 10 "Polyphonic" (1984)

String Quartet No. 11 (1986)

Eight Miniatures on Georgian Folk Tunes for string quartet (1988)

Fantasy after themes from Dolidze's opera "Keto and Kote" for violin and strings (1989)

Five Miniatures on Jewish Folk Tunes for string quartet (1990)

Fantasy on Themes from Gershwin's "Porgy and Bess" for violin and chamber orchestra (1991)

String Quartet No. 12 (1991)

Operas and operettas

The Golden Fleece, opera (1953); libretto by Ira Gelovani

The Spider's Web, operetta (1963)

Singing in the Forest, operetta (1967); libretto by Lewan Tsubabrya

Immortality, oratorio (1969)

The Hermit, opera (1972); libretto by Pjotr Grusinsky

Švejk against Franz Joseph, operetta (1974)

Ballets

The Treasure of the Blue Mountain (1954); libretto by Ira Gelovani

Suite from The Treasure of the Blue Mountain (1954)

Demon (1958) libretto by V. Tsabukiani;

Suite from Demon (1958)

Antique Sketches (1973)

Suite from Antique Sketches (1975)

Dali and the Hunters (1975); libretto by Georgi Aleksidze

Rivares (1982)

Large-scale choral works

Farewell Song, cantata (1956)

The Milkstreet, cantata (1975)

Ballad of a Soldier, requiem (1988)

Solo works

Twenty-Four Preludes for piano (1971)

Sonata for cello solo (1975)

Twelve Children's Pieces for piano (1979)

Film scores

Patara takhvi chuka (1953, short film)

Niko da Nikora (1954, short film)

The Dragonfly (1954)

Suite from The Dragonfly (1954)

Chrdili gzaze (1956)

Bashi-Achuki (1956)

The Scrapper (1956)

A Woman’s Burden (1958)

Otaraant qvrivi (1958, acting as himself)

Maia Tskneteli (1959)

Gantiadi (1961, short film)

Treasure (1961)

Tkhunela (1962)

Zgvis biliki (1962)

Khelmarjve ostati – Sportsmeni (1962, short film)

Tojinebi itsinian (1963)

Father of a Soldier (1964)

Look at These Young People! (1969)

Levan Khidasheli (1973)

Chitis rdze (1975, television film)

Jadosnuri game (1983)

Oqros oboba (1992 television series)
