= Mati Kuulberg =

Estonian composer, violinist and educator

Mati Kuulberg (9 July 1947 Tallinn, Soviet Union – 14 June 2001, Tallinn, Estonia) was an Estonian composer, violinist and educator.

In 1966, he graduated from Tallinn State Conservatory in the music composition speciality. 1966-1974 he was a violinist at Eesti Televisioon and Radio Symphony Orchestra.

1970-1998 he taught music theory and composition in two schools: Georg Ots Tallinn Music School and Tallinn Music High School. Students: Mirjam Tally, Timo Steiner and Mihkel Kerem.

== Works and Legacy ==
- Mati Kuulberg composed orchestral, chamber, and choral works, incorporating elements of Estonian folk melodies and modernist techniques. His notable compositions include:
  - Symphony No. 1 (1972), premiered by the Estonian Radio Symphony Orchestra.
  - String Quartet No. 3 (1985), performed at the Tallinn International Chamber Music Festival.
  - Cantus Balticus (1991), a choral piece commissioned for the Estonian Song Festival. Kuulberg’s pedagogical approach emphasized blending classical rigour with experimentalism.
