= Malcolm Lipkin =

English composer

Malcolm Lipkin (2 May 1932 – 2 June 2017) was an English composer.

== Early life and career ==
Malcolm Leyland Lipkin was born in Liverpool. While a schoolboy at Liverpool College, he studied the piano privately with Gordon Green from 1944 to 1948, and theory with Dr. Caleb Jarvis. In 1949 he won a scholarship to the Royal College of Music in London, where he continued his piano studies with Kendall Taylor until 1953, as well as harmony and counterpoint with Bernard Stevens. Lipkin began his compositional career writing music for his instrument. He played his Second Piano Sonata to Georges Enesco at the 1950 Bryanston Summer School of Music, where he also took composition lessons from Boris Blacher.

From 1954 to 1957 Lipkin studied composition with Mátyás Seiber and later read music externally at London University for his B.Mus. under the guidance of Dr. Anthony Milner, eventually being awarded the degree of D.Mus.Lond for his published, reviewed, publicly performed works. His first major success was the Violin Sonata No 1 (1957), which received over 100 performances within a year of its composition. This was written for the violinist Yfrah Neaman and premiered by Neaman and Howard Ferguson.

Neaman then commissioned the second Violin Concerto (1960-62). The death of Seiber in 1960 in a car accident, while on a lecture tour in South Africa, had shocked Lipkin, and the middle movement of the concerto was written in his memory. Like much of Lipkin's music in the 1960s, the concerto was composed in his early tonal style. The String Trio, dedicated to Joy Finzi, to whose country home at Ashmansworth he was encouraged to come and compose, followed in 1964, showing the clear influence of Seiber, and through him, Bartók.

In 1966 the Royal Liverpool Philharmonic Society commissioned Lipkin's first Symphony, the Sinfonia di Roma. This was a turning point in his developing style, revealing the influence of Seiber in its construction from small melodic and rhythmic cells. However, Lipkin never fully adopted serial technique, so fashionable in the 1960s, and he always remained his own man, becoming something of an outsider in the context of compositional trends of the time, eventually finding an individual identity in his later music.

== Later years ==
During the 1970s, the influence of 17th-century English poetry resulted in Four Departures for Soprano and Violin (settings of Herrick) and The Pursuit (Symphony No. 2), inspired by a quatrain of Andrew Marvell. Herrick was again a starting point for another major work, Sun (Symphony No.3), premiered in 1993. It is structured in arch form, with the three movements representing the morning, noon and evening of human life, and with the central scherzo representing noon, or (in the composer's words) the zenith. It is in such works as the Third Symphony and the Oboe Concerto of 1988 (commissioned by the BBC) that Lipkin found his personal voice. As Meredith Oakes commented on The Pursuit: "Lipkin, who studied with Seiber and Blacher, doesn't exactly sound new but he doesn't sound like anyone else either."

Chamber music was the primary focus of his later years, with works such as the Wind Quintet (1985), Variations on a Theme of Bartok for string quartet (1989), and the Second Violin Sonata (1997). He also returned to composing for the piano, completing his Sixth Sonata in 2002. His eight nocturnes were composed over a 21-year period between 1987 and 2008.

For many years he was a member of the Composers' Guild of Great Britain and for a time served on its executive committee. He was a patron of the Seiber Trust.

Lipkin died on 2 June 2017. His final work was The Journey for recorder solo (2016) written as a tribute to fellow composer (and Liverpudlian) John McCabe.

He died 12 days after his wife, Judith (née Frankel), whom he had married in 1968. They had a son, Jonathan.

== Principal compositions ==
=== Orchestral ===
- Sinfonia di Roma, Symphony No. 1 (1958–1965)
- The Pursuit, Symphony No. 2 (1975–1979)
- Sun, Symphony No. 3 (1979–1986)
- From Across La Manche, Suite for string orchestra (1998)

=== Concertante ===
- Piano Concerto (1957)
- Violin Concerto No. 1 (1951–1952)
- Violin Concerto No. 2 (1960–1962)
- Concerto for Flute and Strings (1974)
- Oboe Concerto (1988–1990)

=== Chamber and instrumental music ===
- Sonata No. 1 for violin and piano (1957)
- Suite for flute and cello (1961)
- String Trio (1963–1964)
- Interplay for recorders, cello and harpsichord (1976)
- Clifford's Tower for wind quintet and string trio (1977)
- Trio for flute, viola and harp (1982)
- Prelude and Dance, for cello and piano (1987)
- Naboth's Vineyard for recorders, cello and harpsichord (1983)
- Piano Trio (1988)
- Variations on a Theme of Bartók for string quartet (1989–1990)
- Dance Fantasy for solo violin (1991)
- Sonata No. 2 for violin and piano (1997)
- Pierrot Dances for viola and piano (1998)
- Little Suite for Flute and Piano (2000)
- Three Pieces for Children for Instrumental Ensemble (2001-3)
- Diversions for Woodwind Sextet (2010)
- Walsingham Variations for chamber ensemble (2013)
- Invocation for Double Bass and Piano (2013)
- The Journey for Solo Recorder (2016)
- In Memoriam John McCabe for Clarinet, Viola and Piano (2016)

=== Keyboard ===
- Piano Sonata No 2 (circa 1950)
- Piano Sonata No 3 (1951)
- Piano Sonata No 4 (1954)
- Metamorphosis for harpsichord (1974)
- Piano Sonata No 5 (1986)
- Piano Sonata No 6 Fantasy (2002)
- Eight Nocturnes (1987-2006)

=== Choral ===
- Psalm 96 for mixed chorus and orchestra (1969)

=== Vocal ===
- Four Departures to Poems of Herrick for soprano and violin (1972)
- Five Songs to Poems of Shelley for soprano and piano (1978)

== Some performances of key works ==
- 1951 Piano Sonata No.3 at Gaudeamus International Music Week, Bilthoven, Holland, played by the composer
- 1952 Piano Sonata No.3 at Mercury Theatre, London, in a Macnaghten Concert, played by the composer
- 1957 Violin Concerto No.1 at Liverpool Stadium, played by Yfrah Neaman and the Royal Liverpool Philharmonic Orchestra conducted by Sir John Pritchard
- 1958 Violin Sonata No.1 on BBC Third Programme played by Yfrah Neaman and Howard Ferguson
- 1963 Violin Concerto No.2, commissioned and played by Yfrah Neaman, with the Bournemouth Symphony Orchestra conducted by Constantin Silvestri
- 1966 Sinfonia di Roma (Symphony No.1) at Philharmonic Hall, Liverpool, the RLPO conducted by Sir Charles Groves
- 1977 Composer's Portrait on BBC Radio 3, featuring Violin Concerto No.2, Metamorphosis for Harpsichord and Four Departures for Soprano and Violin
- 1980 Clifford's Tower for Wind Quintet and String Trio at Cheltenham International Festival of Music, played by the Nash Ensemble
- 1982 Trio for Flute, Viola and Harp at Rye Festival, commissioned and played by the Faber Trio
- 1983 The Pursuit (Symphony No.2) at BBC Manchester, the BBC Philharmonic conducted by Sir Edward Downes
- 1988 Sinfonia di Roma at Broadcasting House, Glasgow, the BBC Scottish Symphony conducted by Lionel Friend
- 1991 Oboe Concerto at St John's Smith Square, London, BBC commission, Gareth Hulse, London Chamber Symphony conducted by Odaline de la Martinez
- 1992 Variations on a theme of Bartók at Newbury Spring Festival, Chelmsford Cathedral Festival and on BBC Radio 3, played by the Delmé String Quartet
- 1993 Sun (Symphony No.3) at Royal Northern College of Music, Manchester, the BBC Philharmonic conducted by Adrian Leaper
- 1996 String Trio at Madley Festival and Chester Summer Music Festival, played by the Leopold String Trio
- 1997 Piano Sonata No.5 at Purcell Room, London, and at Wigmore Hall the following year, commissioned and played by Jeremy Carter, written in memory of Gordon Green
- 1998 From Across La Manche (Suite for Strings) commissioned by Primavera Chamber Orchestra for a tour of South-East England and Northern France, first performed at Canterbury
- 1998 Violin Sonata No.2 commissioned by Green Room Music, Tunbridge Wells, for Levon Chilingirian and Clifford Benson, first performed at Trinity Arts Theatre, Tunbridge Wells
- 2012 Variations on a theme of Bartók at Kings Place London played by the Carducci String Quartet
- 2018 Five Bagatelles for oboe & piano, Pierrot Dances for viola and piano, Little Suite for flute & piano, Duo for violin & cello, Nocturnes for piano. A celebration of the life and music of Malcolm Lipkin, New Brighton Music.

== Recordings ==
- 1985: Clifford's Tower, String Trio and Pastorale arranged for horn and string quintet, recorded on Hyperion Records by the Nash Ensemble
- 1992: Piano Trio, commissioned and recorded on Kingdom Records by the English Piano Trio
- 2005: From Across La Manche (Suite for Strings) recorded on Naxos Records by Royal Ballet Sinfonia conducted by Gavin Sutherland
- 2015: The Symphonies (Sinfonia di Roma, The Pursuit, Sun), recorded by the BBC and released by Lyrita
- 2018: In Memoriam John McCabe, released as part of A Garland for John McCabe on Divine Art
- 2019: Invocation, Leon Bosch, on Meridian
- 2020: String Trio, Pastorale, Clifford's Tower, Prelude and Dance, Naboth's Vineyard, Interplay, and The Journey. On Divine Art
- 2021: Trio for flute, viola and harp, Aurora Trio, EM Records EMRCD069
- 2023: Metamorphosis, Duncan Honeybourne, on Prima Facie
- 2023: Piano Sonatas Nos 5 and 6, Eight Nocturnes, Nathan Williamson, on Lyrita
