= Six sonatas for various instruments =

Chamber music by Claude Debussy

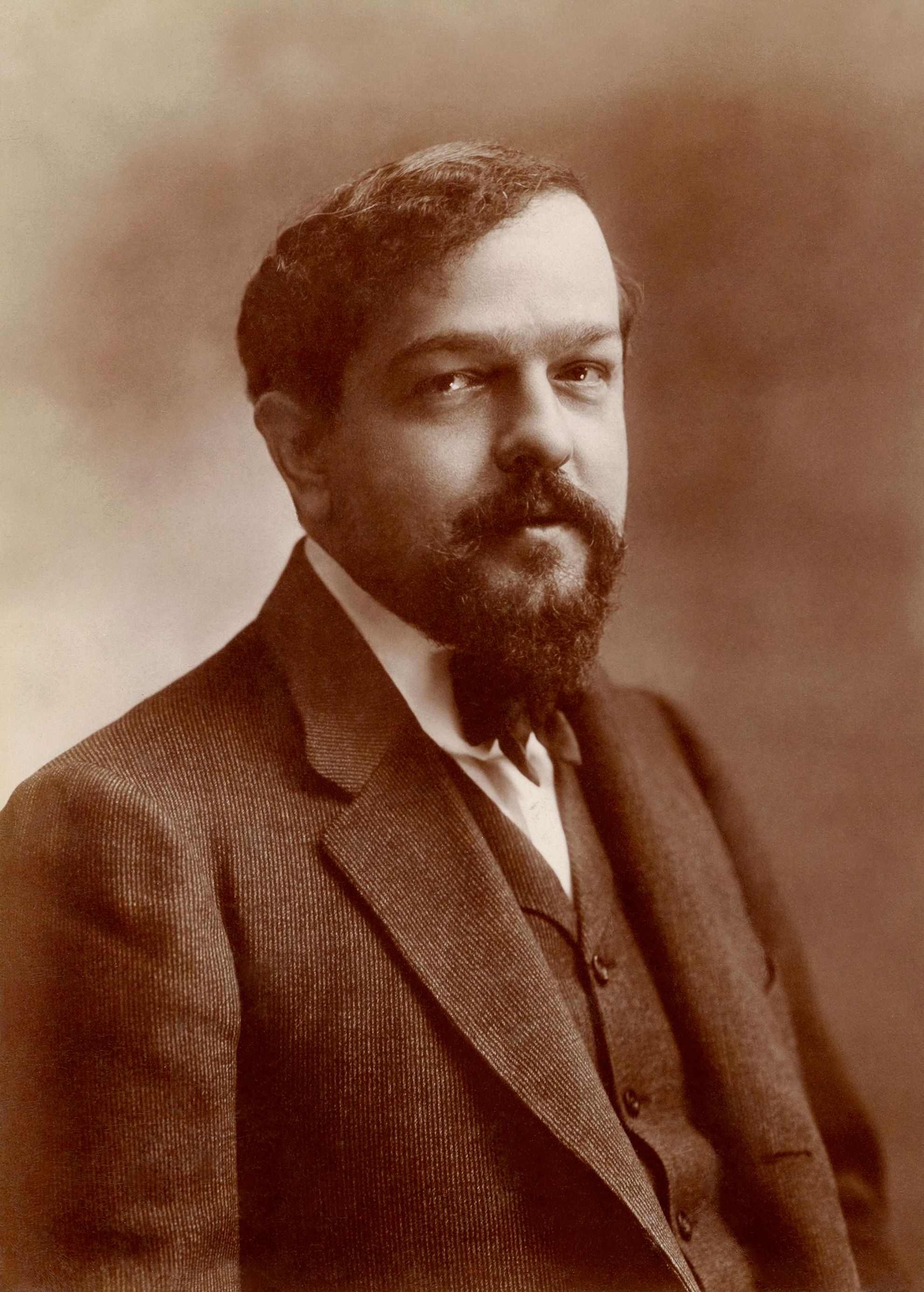
Claude Debussy c. 1900 by Nadar

Claude Debussy's Six sonatas for various instruments (French: Six sonates pour divers instruments) was a projected cycle of sonatas that was interrupted by the composer's death in 1918, after he had composed only half of the projected sonatas. He left behind his sonatas for cello and piano (1915), flute, viola and harp (1915), and violin and piano (1916–1917).

== History ==
From 1914, the composer, encouraged by the music publisher Jacques Durand, intended to write a set of six sonatas for various instruments, in homage to the French composers of the 18th century. The effects of the First World War and an interest in baroque composers Couperin and Rameau inspired Debussy as he was writing the sonatas.

Durand, in his memoirs entitled Quelques souvenirs d'un éditeur de musique, wrote the following about the sonatas' origin:

After his famous String Quartet, Debussy had not written any more chamber music. Then, at the Concerts Durand, he heard again the Septet with trumpet by Saint-Saëns and his sympathy for this means of musical expression was reawoken. He admitted the fact to me and I warmly encouraged him to follow his inclination. And that is how the idea of the six sonatas for various instruments came about.

In a letter to the conductor Bernard Molinari, Debussy explained that the set should include "different combinations, with the last sonata combining the previously used instruments". His death on 25 March 1918 prevented him from carrying out his plan, and only three of the six sonatas were completed and published by Durand, with a dedication to his second wife, Emma Bardac.

== Sonatas ==
=== Sonata for cello and piano ===
The sonata for cello and piano, L. 135, was written in 1915, and is notable for its brevity, most performances not exceeding 11 minutes. It is a staple of the modern cello repertoire and is commonly regarded as one of the finest masterpieces written for the instrument.

The work has three movements:

1. Prologue: Lent, sostenuto e molto risoluto
2. Sérénade: Modérément animé
3. Finale: Animé, léger et nerveux

The final two movements are joined by an attacca. Instead of sonata form, Debussy structures the piece in the style of the eighteenth-century monothematic sonata, and was particularly influenced by the music of François Couperin.

The piece makes use of modes and whole-tone and pentatonic scales, as is typical of Debussy's style. It also uses many types of extended cello technique, including left-hand pizzicato, spiccato and flautando bowing, false harmonics and portamenti. The piece is considered technically demanding.

Whether descriptive comments related to characters of the Commedia dell'arte were actually given by Debussy to cellist Louis Rosoor remains unclear.

=== Sonata for flute, viola and harp ===
The sonata for flute, viola, and harp, L. 137, was also written in 1915.

The first performance of the Sonata took place in Boston, at Jordan Hall in the New England Conservatory, on 7 November 1916. The performers were members of a wind ensemble called the Longy Club, which had been founded by the principal oboist of the Boston Symphony Orchestra, George Longy. The first performance in France was a private one that occurred on 10 December 1916, at the home of Debussy's publisher, Jacques Durand. The first public performance in France was thought to be at a charity concert on 9 March 1917. However, Thompson reported a performance of the sonata at London's Aeolian Hall by Albert Fransella, Harry Waldo Warner and Miriam Timothy on 2 February 1917 as part of a concert otherwise given by the London String Quartet. A typical performance lasts between 17 and 18 minutes.

According to Léon Vallas (1929), Debussy initially planned this as a piece for flute, oboe and harp. He subsequently decided that the viola's timbre would be a better combination for the flute than the oboe's, so he changed the instrumentation to flute, viola and harp.

The work has three movements:

1. Pastorale: Lento, dolce rubato
2. Interlude: Tempo di Minuetto
3. Finale: Allegro moderato ma risoluto

This instrumentation of flute, viola and harp was formerly rare, but later became a standard ensemble, largely influenced by this work.

=== Sonata for violin and piano ===
The sonata for violin and piano in G minor, L. 140, was written in 1917. It was the composer's last major composition and is notable for its brevity; a typical performance lasts about 13 minutes. The premiere took place on 5 May 1917, the violin part played by Gaston Poulet, with Debussy himself at the piano. It was his last public performance.

The work has three movements:

1. Allegro vivo
2. Intermède: Fantasque et léger
3. Finale: Très animé

=== The unfinished sonatas ===
Debussy wrote in the manuscript of his violin sonata that the fourth sonata should be written for oboe, horn, and harpsichord, and the fifth for trumpet, clarinet, bassoon and piano.

For the final and sixth sonata, Debussy envisioned a concerto where the sonorities of the "various instruments" combine, with the gracious assistance of the double bass, making the instrumentation of the six sonatas as follows:

Instrumentation in the Six Sonatas
Sonata 1	Sonata 2	Sonata 3	Sonata 4	Sonata 5	Sonata 6
					Double bass
				Trumpet	Trumpet
				Clarinet	Clarinet
				Bassoon	Bassoon
			Oboe		Oboe
			Horn		Horn
			Harpsichord		Harpsichord
		Violin			Violin
	Flute				Flute
	Viola				Viola
	Harp (or Piano)				Harp
Cello					Cello
Piano	Harp (or Piano)	Piano		Piano	Piano

== Influence and legacy ==
The idea of combining the instruments oboe, horn, and harpsichord, inspired Thomas Adès to write his Sonata da Caccia, and the combination of the instruments trumpet, clarinet, bassoon and piano, inspired Marc-André Dalbavie to write his Axiom.

The American composer Steven Stucky wrote a 7-movement sonata for oboe, horn, and harpsichord entitled Sonate en forme de préludes, inspired by the fourth sonata's instrumentation

The Australian composer Lyle Chan has written three sonatas for the same combinations of instruments as in the three unfinished Debussy sonatas. Chan based his works on his research about Debussy's engagement with the clavecinistes of the French Baroque, Debussy's editions of Bach and Chopin, and an apparent structure that sonatas 1, 3 and 5 are for conventional groupings of instruments of Debussy's time, whereas 2, 4 and 6 are for unusual ones.

== Bibliography ==
- Lockspeiser, Edward; Halbreich, Harry (1980). Claude Debussy (in French). Paris: Fayard. p. 823. ISBN 2-213-00921-X.
