= Eva Noer Kondrup =

Danish classical composer

Eva Noer Kondrup (born 23 April 1964) is a Danish composer of classical music who has written piano pieces, chamber music, orchestral works and operas. As resident composer with the Aalborg Symphony Orchestra in the early 2000s, she wrote Ulvemælk (for viola and symphony orchestra) and Salt strøm salt (for soprano and orchestra). She is however associated above all with her operas, Neja (1999) and Den Rejsende or The Traveller (2018).

== Biography ==
Born in 1964, Eva Noer Kondrup enjoyed listening to music and playing folk music as a child but it was first when she was 18 that she became seriously interested in classical music. Despite following an introductory course to music at Holsterbro Musikskole, it was not until her late twenties that she started to study composition at the Royal Danish Academy of Music, graduating in 1997. In addition, she attended master classes with Iannis Xenakis, George Crumb and Louis Andriessen and studied composition under Hans Gefors at the Malmö Academy of Music.

Her latest composition, the 50-minute experimental opera Den Rejsende (The Traveller) is inspired by the large number of refugees who crossed the Danish border in September 2015 and made their way to Sweden, walking along the motorway. The music is based on the folk music traditions of the Middle East and the Balkans. The première on 3 February 2018 is to be presented in the Takkelloftet room at the Royal Danish Theatre in Copenhagen.

== Compositions ==
Noer Kondrup's compositions include:

- 3 Studies for Piano, 1993
- Wave piece, chamber music, 1993
- 3 sange fra Det, mezzo-soprano solos with instrumental accompaniment, 1995
- Epilog, chamber music, 1995
- Diary from the Mountains, flute solo, 1996
- Klara's Perle, orchestra, 1997
- While Time Sleeps..., violin and piano, 1997
- Neja, opera, 1999
- Neja Sange, solo with instrumental accompaniment, 1999
- Ulvemælk, viola solo with orchestra, 2002
- En tur på stranden, piano solo, 2016
- Den Rejsende, opera, 2018

== Awards ==
In 2002, Noer Kondrup received De unges Sonningpris (the Sonning Youth Prize) from the Danish Léonie Sonnings Music Foundation.
