= Mihkel Kerem =

Estonian composer and violinist (born 1981)

Mihkel Kerem (born 23 January 1981 in Tallinn) is an Estonian composer and violinist.

== Career ==
Kerem was born in Tallinn, where his father Jaan Karem played with the Estonia Opera for 40 years. He studied at the Tallinn Music High School (where his mother taught violin), and then at the Estonian Academy of Music and Theatre from 1999 to 2002, studying two disciplines: violin and composition. He then moved to the UK to complete a master's thesis at the Royal College of Music under William Mival and Levon Chilingirian.

He has been a violinist in several musical groups, such as the Kerem Quartet and the Tobias String Quartet and (since 2015) as Joint Assistant Leader First Violin for the Royal Liverpool Philharmonic Orchestra.

Kerem has been a prolific composer since childhood, and completed over 170 works, including nine symphonies, many concertos and ten string quartets. His musical soundworld has been described by Paul Conway as sitting "somewhere between Sibelius and Schnittke". In 2021 Kerem composed the score for 1984, a film directed by Gijs Besseling, Emlyn Stam and Sophie Hunter.

== Works ==
Orchestral

- Symphony No. 1 (1996)
- Symphony No. 2 (unfinished)
- Symphony No. 3 For the Victims of Communism (2003)
- Divertimento for orchestra (2007)
- Fanfare for symphony orchestra (2010)
- Sinfonietta Portobellica (2010)
- Symphony No. 4 2016 (2019)
- Symphony No. 5 (2020)
- Symphony No. 6 (2020)
- Symphony No. 7 (2021)
- Symphony No. 8 (2022)
- Sinfonietta Belle d’Oca (2025)
- Symphony No. 9 To Fight Against This Age, text by Rob Riemen (2025)

Concertante

- Concerto for viola and orchestra (1994)
- Concerto for violin and orchestra (1994)
- Concerto for two cellos (2000)
- Lament (Lamento) for cello or viola and string orchestra (2008/2009)
- 1984 for cello, actor and orchestra (2017)
- Violin Concerto (2018)
- Cello Concerto (2020)
- Piano Concerto (2023)

Chamber music

- String Quartet No. 1 (1993)
- Six sonatinas for solo violin (1993-1994)
- Sonata No. 1 for violin and piano (1993–1994)
- String Quartet No. 2 (1994)
- String Quartet No. 3 (1995)
- String Quartet No. 4 (1995)
- Sonata No. 2 for violin and piano (1996)
- Piano Quintet (1997)
- String Octet (1997)
- String Quartet No. 5 (1999)
- String Quartet No. 6 (2001)
- String Quartet No. 7 (2002)
- String Quartet No. 8 (2004)
- String Sextet (2004)
- Nimetud lood (Nameless Pieces) for clarinet, viola and piano (2006)
- Sonata No. 3 for violin and piano (2006)
- Sonata for viola and piano (2007)
- Sonata for cello and piano (2008)
- String Quartet No. 9 Beefsquartet (2009)
- Piano Sonata (2011)
- Retrospect for violin and piano (2013)
- Sonata for solo cello (2013)
- Dersim for violin and piano (2014)
- Kurdish Suite, piano quintet (2016)
- The Society Trilogy, violin, viola, cello, bass (2016)
- Mesopotamia for violin and piano (2017)
- 1984 Suite, chamber ensemble (2019)
- Mutations for violin and cello (2019)
- String Quartet No. 10 (2020)
- A Haunting from the Past, cello and piano (2023)
- Sonata for violin and piano No. 4 (2024)
- Piano Trio (2025)

Vocal and choral

- Four Kurdish Songs (2017)
- The Seasons for chamber choir (2013)
- The Book of Longing (text Leonard Cohen), male voice and cello (2011)

=== Recordings ===
- Violin Sonatas Nos. 1-3, Toccata Classics TOCC0140 (2012)
- Orchestral and Chamber Music: Symphony No. 3, Lamento for viola and strings, String Sextet, Toccata TOCC0173 (2013)
- Baltic Soundscapes: includes A Haunting from the Past for cello and piano. Stradivarius STR37343 (2026)
- Orchestral Music Vol. 2: Symphonies Nos. 7 and 8. Toccata TOCC0776 (2026)
