= Tallinn Music High School =

Music school in Tallinn

Coordinates: 59.3722°N 24.6615°E

- Tallinna Muusikakeskkool
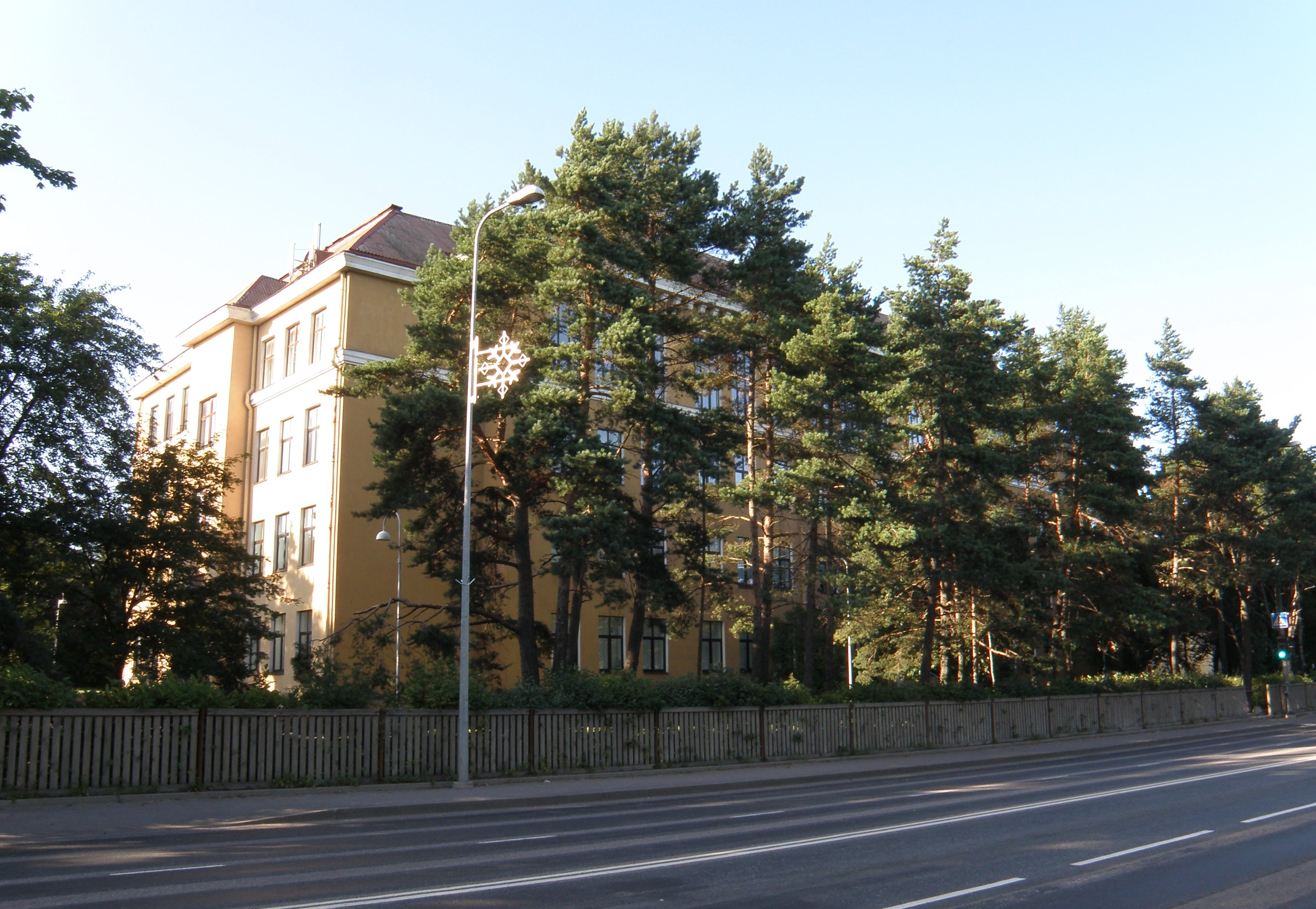

Location
- Vabaduse puiestee 130; 10920 Tallinn; Estonia

Information
- Type: Public
- Established: September 1961
- Principal: Timo Steiner
- Grades: 1–12
- Age: 7 to 19
- Enrollment: ca. 400
- Average class size: 25
- Language: Estonian
- Colors: Dark blue, red, white
- Website: www.tmkk.edu.ee

Tallinn Music High School (Estonian: Tallinna Muusikakeskkool) was a special music high school in Tallinn, Estonia.

== History ==
TMHS was founded in 1961 to ensure a sufficient number of quality applicants to the Tallinn State Conservatory (now Estonian Academy of Music and Theatre). It did fulfill its goal successfully, as 80–100% of graduates continued their studies at EAMT or at other music academies abroad.

TMHS was the only school in Estonia that provided a professional music education alongside the general primary and secondary curriculum. This system prepared students for a career in music or in any other field.

There were 38 senior teachers and 23 teachers on staff with qualifications to teach at the university level. Also, no fewer than 27 professors from the Estonian Academy of Music and Theatre also tutored students at TMHS. TMHS was closed in spring 2022; since September 2022, similar education is provided by Tallinn School of Music and Ballet which was formed by merger of TMHS, Georg Ots Music School of Tallinn, and Tallinn Ballet School.

== Principals ==
- 1961–1965 Eugen Kapp
- 1965–1968 Jüri Plink
- 1968–1975 Endel Loitme
- 1975–1977 Harald Aasa
- 1977–1987 Ants Elvik
- 1987–1991 Jüri Plink
- 1991–2005 Tiina Ehin
- 2005–2021 Timo Steiner
- 2021–2022 Marja Jürisson

== Notable alumni ==
Most of Estonia's better-known musicians of the middle and younger generations are alumnae of TMHS, including:

Composers:

- René Eespere
- Mati Kuulberg
- Rein Rannap
- Jüri Reinvere
- Urmas Sisask
- Lepo Sumera
- Helena Tulve
- Ardo Ran Varres
- Mari Vihmand

Conductors:

- Olari Elts
- Tõnu Kaljuste
- Mikk Murdvee
- Andres Mustonen
- Erki Pehk
- Anu Tali
- Elmo Tiisvald
- Arvo Volmer

Pianists:

- Ivari Ilja
- Peep Lassmann
- Sten Lassmann
- Marko Martin
- Mihkel Poll
- Kalle Randalu
