= Birgitta Festival =

Music festival in Tallinn, Estonia

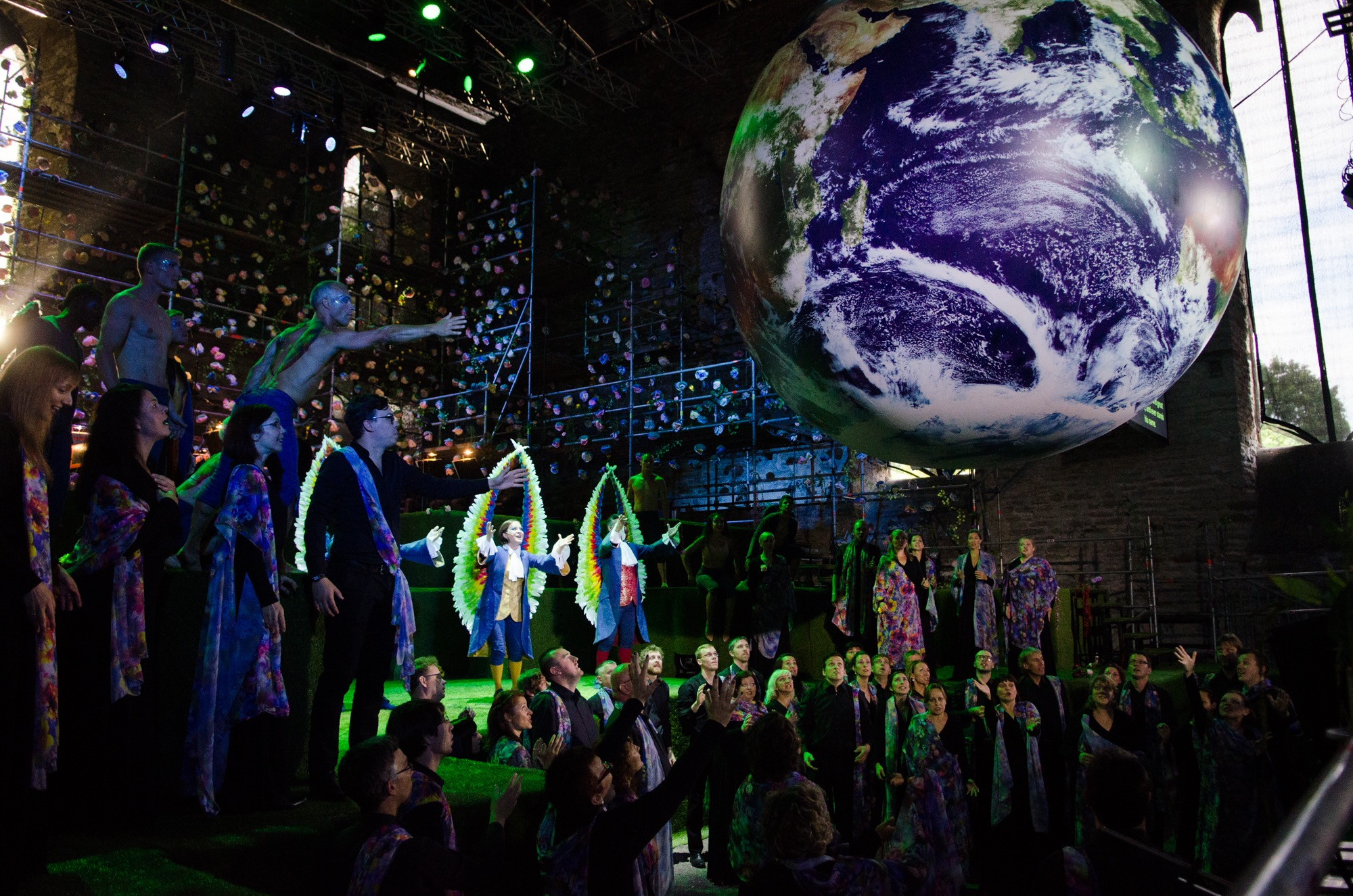
Festival during the oratorium "The Creation" in 2015

Birgitta Festival (Estonian: Birgitta festival) is an Estonian musical theatre festival which every year takes place in Pirita convent, Tallinn. The festival is the only one of its kind in the Baltic states. The festival is organised by Tallinn Philharmonics.

First festival took place in 2005 and it was initiated by Eri Klas together with Tallinn City Government.

Since 2020 festival's artistic director is Dmitry Bertman.

Festival's number of visitors is about 8000.
