= Robert W. Jones =

American composer (1932–1997)

Robert William Jones (16 December 1932 – 28 May 1997) was a 20th-century American composer.

== Life ==
Robert W. Jones was born in Oak Park, Illinois. He studied at University of Redlands, University of Minnesota and at the American Conservatory of Music in Chicago. He was a student of Wayne Bohrnstedt.

From 1965 to 1969 he taught at public schools in West Hartford, thereafter at Schoolcraft College in Livonia, Michigan and at the University of Minnesota.

== Works (selection) ==
- Sonata for Worship No 2 (Prelude; Offertory; Postlude), Shawnee HF-32
- Sonata for Worship No 3 (Preamble; Echo Fantasy; Recessional), Shawnee HF-34
- Sonata for Worship No 6 (Introit; Invocation and Dance; Meditation; 1971), org/electronic tape, Flammer HF-5067
- "St. Denio": a Toccata for Organ, Sacred Music Press/Boosey & Hawkes
