= Nino Janjgava =

Georgian composer (born 1964)

- Born: 1964 (age 61–62); Tbilisi, Georgian SSR, Soviet Union
- Occupation: Composer
- Era: Contemporary

Nino Janjgava (Georgian: ნინო ჯანჯღავა, romanized: nino janjghava; born July 29, 1964) is a Georgian music composer.

== Biography ==
Nino Janjgava studied composition with Aleksandre Machavariani, orchestration with Sulkhan Tsintsadze and polyphony with Archil Chimakadze at Tbilisi Conservatory, where she graduated in 1988. She had postgraduate studies in composition with Sulkhan Tsintsadze from 1988 to 1990.

Her composition Three Poems by Jarji Pkhoveli was awarded the third prize in Moscow's International Competition in 1986.

She has been a member of the Georgian Composers Union since 1990.

Janjgava has composed for ballet, symphonic, choral, vocal, chamber and instrumental music styles, as well for theater and cinema.

In 2006 she founded the choral–instrumental ensemble Theatre of Sound.
