= Mari Vihmand =

Estonian composer

- Born: 17 May 1967 (age 59); Tallinn, then part of Estonian SSR, Soviet Union
- Education: Estonian Academy of Music and Theatre

Mari Vihmand (born 17 May 1967 in Tallinn) is an Estonian composer. From 1987 to 1995 she taught music theory at the Tallinn Music High School.

== Early life and education ==
In 1997 she graduated from Estonian Academy of Music and Theatre. 1995–1997, she studied at Lyon Conservatory of Music in France.

Since 1992 she has been a member of Estonian Composers' Union. Since 1997, she lives in the town Bad Urach near Stuttgart.

Most of her work is chamber music

== Style of music ==
Vihmand's musical style is recognized for its restrainedly lyrical and freshly sentimental quality, while her music language is often described as poetic and expressive, with an emphasis on balancing the emotional and rational aspects. Her finely crafted sound qualities distinguish her music from others. Vihmand achieved international recognition for her orchestral piece "Floreo," which won the first prize in the category of under-30-year-olds at the UNESCO International Rostrum of Composers held in Paris in 1996. She was also awarded the Cultural Prize of the Republic of Estonia for her chamber opera "Lugu klaasist...Geschichte von Glas" (1995).

== Notable works and recognition ==
Mari Vihmand's compositions have been featured prominently in various international festivals and performances. Her chamber opera "The Story of Glass," premiered in 1995 at the NYYD Festival, draws on allegories from fairy tales by Hans Christian Andersen and Villy Sorensen. This work earned her the Cultural Prize of the Republic of Estonia in the same year. Her orchestral piece "Floreo" was awarded first prize at the UNESCO International Rostrum of Composers in Paris in 1996, in the under-30 category, showcasing her early international recognition.

== Works ==
- Laul õnnelikust Corydonist ja Phyllisest (for sopran and chamber ensemble, 1992)
- Sinfonie (1993)
- Lugu klassist (chamber opera, 1995)
- Armastuse valem (opera, 2008)
