= Robert Kelly (composer) =

American composer, composition teacher, and violinist

J. Robert Kelly (September 26, 1916 in Clarksburg West Virginia – July 4, 2007 in Urbana, Illinois) was an American composer, composition teacher, and violinist. Kelly began studying violin at six with Albert Kember and later majored in violin at the Juilliard School of Music under Samuel Gardner. Kelly earned his Bachelor of Music Degree (1942) from the Curtis Institute of Music, where he studied composition with Rosario Scalero. After earning his Bachelor's degree and some time teaching junior college, Kelly begin teaching at the University of Illinois (1946-1976). Later on Kelly continued his studies at the Eastman School of Music, where he studied with Herbert Elwell and earned his Master of Music Degree in Composition (1952).

Robert Kelly Picture

== Biography ==
=== Early life ===
Robert Kelly was born in Clarksburg, WV on September 26, 1919; to Dallas D. Kelly and Fannie M. Robinson. While Kelly's parents were not musicians, despite his father playing the saxophone on rare occasions, the town of Clarksburg was filled with professional musicians. Kelly studied violin with Albert Kember at the age of six and clarinet with Frank Migliaccio. It was during Kelly's high school career that he began exploring the world of composing. After the world premiere of The Rhyme of the Ancient Mariner by Gibson Morrissey in Clarksburg, Kelly began to write his own works. Without a teacher to guide him, Kelly states "I just composed with what little knowledge I had." Kelly began writing for violin and piano and with some help from his accompanist on the piano part; it was with this that Kelly began his journey of becoming a composer.

=== Juilliard ===
Kelly began studying at the Institute of Musical Arts of the Juilliard School of Music in the fall of 1935. Kelly studied violin with Samuel Gardner, to whom Kelly admired for his piece, From the Canebrake. It was not until the second semester of his first year that Kelly began to compose again. He put together two works for violin and piano, still without any assistance from a teacher. The following school year (fall 1936), Kelly was unable to return to Juilliard due to financial reasons. In order to continue his studies in music, Kelly needed to find a job, but with the depression, jobs were unavailable in his home town of Clarksburg. Kelly decided to go back to New York with his high school companion, Raymond Castello who was studying at Juilliard at the time. Kelly found work in the Eagle Pencil Paper Box Factory, but after several months in the factory, Kelly realized that his efforts was not going to get him back into Juilliard.

=== Salem College ===
After returning home from working in the Eagle Pencil Paper Box Factory in New York, Kelly spoke to his old violin teacher, Albert Kember, who encouraged him to attend Salem College, Salem WV. Kelly spent a couple of years at Salem College, but it was not until the college hired Matthew N. Lundquist that Kelly felt like he belonged there. Lundquist was hired on as the new choral conductor, but he was also a composer and Kelly quickly began studying composition with him. After sometime studying with Lundquist, he encouraged Kelly to apply in composition to The Curtis Institute of Music. Kelly was accepted in the spring of 1938 and began studying composition with Rosario Scalero in the fall of 1939.

=== University of Illinois ===
After three years in the Army, Kelly was discharged in late February 1946; it was then that he decided to try for a teaching position at a college. Kelly received interviews from two universities, Indiana University and the University of Illinois, however he cancelled his interview with Indiana University and took the job as an assistant professor at the University of Illinois in August 1946. During his time at the University of Illinois, Kelly's completed list of compositions grew and his work matured. Kelly became exposed to some of the greatest composers that inspired him in different ways. One of the first visiting composers was Igor Stravinsky in the spring of 1949, Stravinsky was there to conduct some of his works with the Faculty Chambermusic Orchestra for the University of Illinois Contemporary Music Festival. Kelly was playing viola with the group at the time and although Stravinsky was unaware of it, he was giving Kelly a composition lesson as he explained to the group exactly how he wanted his music performed. Kelly stated that Stravinsky's clarity of rhythms and melodic punctuations influenced him in his own works.

In the fall of 1964, Kelly had a two semester appointment as Associate Member of the University of Illinois Center for Advanced Study. Kelly was to begin work on a full length dramatic opera, which gave creation to The White Gods. Before the music was composed, Kelly spent time researching the Aztec culture, in order to better portray the resentment that was caused by the intrusion of the white man into the highly developed culture of the Aztec. Unfortunately the production was never given a full stage production, mainly because of expense. There have been several performances of parts of the opera including: Four Aztec Dances and a Suite for Orchestra from the opera.

== Honors and commissions ==
- 1957 Guest Composer of the New York City Composers Forum
- 1963 Appointed Associate Member of the University of Illinois Center for Advanced Study with a grant to compose an opera, The White Gods.
- 1958 Commission from University of Illinois for Symphony No. 2.
- 1961 Commission from University of Illinois for Emancipation Symphony.
- 1968 Commission from National Endowment for the Arts for Concerto for Violin and Orchestra.
- 1976 Commission from National Endowment for the Arts for Concerto for Viola and Orchestra.

== Selected works ==
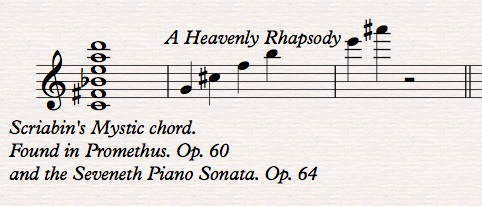
Example from Robert Kelly's "A Heavenly Rhapsody"

- Miniature Symphony, Op. 14 (1948)
- Symphony No. 2 (1958)
- Emancipation Symphony, Op. 39 (1961)
- Concerto for Violin and Orchestra (1968)
- Concerto for Viola and Orchestra (1976)
- Walden Pond for string quartet (1975)
- The White Gods, Opera in 3 acts, Op. 44 (1963–1965)
- A Heavenly Rhapsody, Op. 63

Literary works

- Kelly, Robert. The Evolution of an American Composer. Urbana, IL. (101 W. Windsor Rd. #4314, Urbana 61802). (Self-published)

== Recording ==
Suite for Cello Solo, Op. 28
