= Michael Kibbe =

American classical composer

Michael Kibbe (born 1945) is an American contemporary classical music composer born in San Diego, California. He has composed over 240 concert works and created numerous arrangements. His writing covers many musical styles, encompassing tonal, modal and non-diatonic languages. His style typically incorporates modern structures, but in a way that is still accessible to all kinds of classical listeners. There are influences of American composer Gershwin in the Serenade Number 2 for two clarinets that seem at once blues, jazz and classical. Some of his writings have been compared to work by Prokofiev.

== Compositions ==
At the core of his output are the 14 wind quintets, several works for solo woodwind with strings, and numerous other chamber music pieces for winds, strings, keyboards and percussion. Three Sonatas for bass clarinet and piano have also proven popular with clarinetists. His work also encompasses larger forms: over a dozen concertos and works for band, orchestra and chorus. His Humboldt Currents Brass Octet (3 trumpets in B flat, horn, three trombones, and tuba), is a work in three movements.

His works have been played throughout the United States, Europe, Russia, Mexico, China and Israel by both professional and University orchestral and chamber groups. Recent performances have been by the San Fernando Valley Symphony, the Eureka Symphony Orchestra, Humboldt State University Concert Band and the University of Texas Pan American Cello Festival. Many of his works have been performed on radio and published on music CDs.

== Commissioned pieces ==
Kibbe has written pieces on commission for the Cultural Affairs Department of the City of Los Angeles, Humboldt State University Concert Band, Pacific Serenades (Los Angeles), the Jewel City Flute Choir (Glendale, CA) and the Buffalo-Niagara Concert Band, among others. In 1988, Kibbe won the Debussy Trio Award for best composer by the National Association of Composers in a national competition.

== Performances ==
Kibbe performs on most of the standard woodwind instruments, and holds a performing degree in oboe and bassoon from New Mexico State University and a composition degree from California State University, Northridge.

For four decades he worked with the Los Angeles film and recording industry in roles that included instrumental performer and music copyist for films, radio, TV and live venues. For 17 years he was an oboist with the North Wind Quintet which did numerous public (including radio) and school performances and performed concert tours of Mexico three times. He was also the principal oboist of the Symphonic Winds of Los Angeles for five years. Kibbe has performed as an artist on numerous published classical music CD's.

Kibbe continues to compose and perform in Northern California. His wife—Vanessa Kibbe—is a professional violinist with the Eureka Symphony Orchestra.

== Discography ==
Masks, Selected Chamber Works, a compilation of chamber music works composed by Kibbe for winds, string and mixed ensembles. Includes, Six Preludes for Solo Cello, Wind Quintets #1 and #7, a string duo and the atmospheric "Death in the Backyard" for soprano and small ensemble. 2017.

Debussy Trio Plays Harp, Flute, and Viola Trios. Michael Kibbe is composer of one piece entitled, Trio Op. 99.

Fantastic Voyage by North Wind Quintet. Kibbe is Oboist and arranger of the pieces.

Fantasy for Wizards performed by Wizards! Kibbe is composer of Divertimento Op. 39

Trio Indiana Kibbe is composer for Ebony Suite for 3 clarinets Opus 116

String of Pearls by LuminArias includes a 3 movement piece by Kibbe called Malibu Music for violin and viola.

Dance of the Renaissance, with Kibbe playing Oboe and Recorder

Bozza Nova by Mariinsky Clarinet Club with Kibbe works: Ebony Suite and Shtetl Tanzen

Bassics Music for Bass Clarinet and Piano, Henri Bok, Sonata, Opus 40 by Michael Kibbe
