= Metsakalmistu =

Cemetery in Tallinn, Estonia

Coordinates: 59°28′11″N 24°52′14″E

Tallinn Forest Cemetery Chapel, designed by architect Herbert Johanson

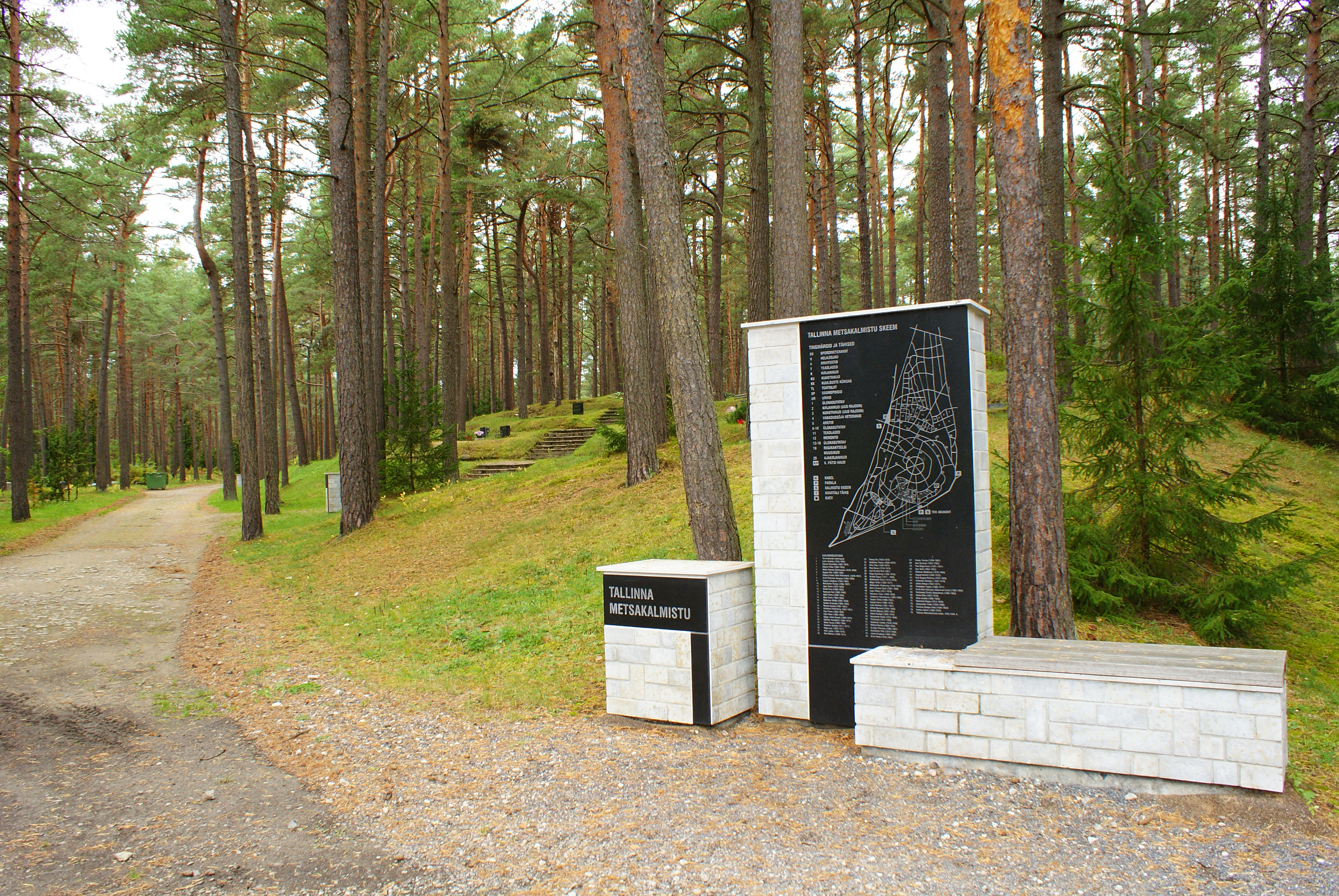

Metsakalmistu (English: Forest Cemetery) is a cemetery in the Pirita district of Tallinn.

== History ==
Metsakalmistu was originally planned to be a public central city cemetery. Eduard Vilde was the first to be buried in 1933. The original area of the cemetery was 24.2 hectares, but it has since expanded to 48.3 hectares.

Metsakalmistu was officially opened in 1939. That same year, 15 people were buried in the cemetery. In 1939, the nearby Kloostrimetsa Farm cemetery was created, which eventually, through expansion, became part of an expanded Metsakalmistu.

At first, the designers of the cemetery were unanimous about the general design requirements of the cemetery, but the area was still dominated by the appearance of a wild forest. Initially, there was placement of crosses, girders, ranks, and calcareous stones, the largest size of which were 80 × 50 cm. Subsequently, the use of natural barriers, such as grass slabs, were built and have been extended to include a moss bed cover, along with borders marked by flowers. Monumental gravestones were not recommended initially for the cemetery, but they still exist to a small extent. At present, the permissible maximum height for a pillar is 1.5 m.

The main chapel of Metsakalmistu was built in 1936, with its main architect being Herbert Johanson. The chapel was vandalized by the Soviet Union after the establishment of the Estonian SSR, but in 1996, it was restored with the support of the Tallinn City Government. In 2006, a columbarium was built.

Tombstones in Metsakalmistu are reserved for notable Estonian people involved in, among other professions, theatre, sports, composing, writing, the arts, journalism, medicine, architecture, and science, as well as other public figures; those who were soldiers in the Finnish Infantry Regiment 200, as well as the veterans of the Estonian War of Independence, are also buried here.

== Notable people interred in the cemetery ==
- Evald Aav
- Urmas Alender (cenotaph)
- August Alle
- Ants Antson
- Lydia Auster
- Eduard Bornhöhe
- Heino Eller
- August Englas
- Gustav Ernesaks
- Ants Eskola
- Illar Hallaste
- Helle-Reet Helenurm
- Johannes Hint
- Ella Ilbak
- August Jakobson
- Jaak Joala
- Jüri Järvet
- Ottniell Jürissaar
- Karl Kalkun
- Eugen Kapp
- Nikolai Karotamm
- Kärt Jänes-Kapp
- Paul Keres
- Kaljo Kiisk
- Tõnu Kilgas
- Virve Kiple
- Albert Kivikas
- Paul Kogerman
- Lydia Koidula
- Konstantin Konik
- Johannes Kotkas
- Raimund Kull
- Ilmar Kullam
- Henn-Ants Kurg
- Betty Kuuskemaa
- Johannes Käbin
- Heli Lääts
- Ants Lauter
- Artur Lemba
- Astrid Lepa
- Kalju Lepik
- Robert Lepikson
- Voldemar Lender
- Heino Lipp
- Endel Lippmaa
- Viljar Loor
- Sulev Luik
- Ada Lundver
- Meta Luts
- Ottomar Maddison
- Heino Mandri
- Alo Mattiisen
- Roman Matsov
- Lennart Meri
- Lepo Mikko
- Mati Nuude
- Sulev Nõmmik
- Bruno Oja
- Karl Oole
- Georg Ots
- Rein Otsason
- Ülo Õun
- Kristjan Palusalu
- Boris Parsadanian
- Konstantin Päts
- Paul Pinna
- Dan Põldroos
- Voldemar Puhk
- Helmi Puur
- Edgar Puusepp
- Endel Puusepp
- Egon Rannet
- Alfons Rebane
- Salme Reek
- August Rei
- Arnold Rüütel
- Johannes Semper
- Juhan Smuul
- Sophie Sooäär
- Ülo Sooster
- Olev Subbi
- Lepo Sumera
- Aino Talvi
- Väino Tamm
- A. H. Tammsaare
- Ruut Tarmo
- Otto Tief
- Villu Toots
- Friedebert Tuglas
- Lo Tui
- Mati Unt
- Artur Vader
- Katrin Välbe
- Raimond Valgre
- Edgar Valter
- Johannes Vares-Barbarus
- Asta Vihandi
- Juhan Viiding
- Edgar Viies
- Aarne Viisimaa
- Vello Viisimaa
- Eduard Vilde
- Silvi Vrait

== See also ==
- List of cemeteries in Estonia
