= Viisimaa =

Surname list

Viisimaa is an Estonian surname. Notable people with the surname include:

- Aarne Viisimaa (1898–1989), Estonian operatic tenor and opera director
- Vello Viisimaa (1928–1991), Estonian singer and actor, son of Aarne
