= Meta Luts =

Estonian actress (1905–1958)

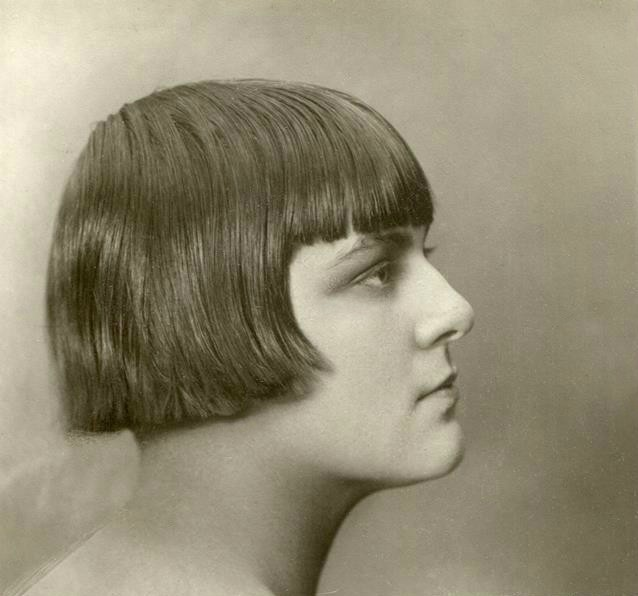
- Luts in the 1920s
- Born: 5 September 1905; Riidaja Parish, Governorate of Livonia
- Died: 1 July 1958 (aged 52); Tallinn, Estonia
- Occupation: Actress
- Years active: 1923–1958
- Relatives: Karin Luts (sister); Julius Gentalen (cousin)

Meta Luts (5 September 1905 – 1 July 1958) was an Estonian actress. Known mostly for her appearances on stage, she also performed in radio theatre and appeared in several films. Her career spanned nearly forty years.

== Early life and education ==
Meta Luts was born in the rural municipality of Riidaja in Valga County to parents Andres and Juuli Mari Luts (née Gentalen). She had two older sisters, Lonny and Karin, and a younger brother named Elmar. Karin would go on to become a successful painter and graphic artist. Her first cousin was artist Julius Gentalen. The family moved to Pärnu in her early childhood where she attended primary and secondary schools and took dance lessons from Marie Kalbek-Maddi, who worked as a dance instructor for the Endla Theatre. Later, when instructors from the Estonia Theatre (now, the Estonian National Opera) came to Pärnu to offer theatre courses, she studied dance with actor and dancer Robert Rood and was convinced by her father's friend, Estonia Theatre director and theatre pedagogue Karl Jungholz, to become a stage actress.

== Career ==
=== Stage ===
In 1923, Luts began an engagement at Endla Theatre that lasted until 1925, when she joined the Estonia Theatre in Tallinn. Luts left the Estonia Theatre in 1949 to begin an engagement at the Tallinn State Drama Theatre (now, the Estonian Drama Theatre), where she appeared as an actress until her death in 1958. During her prolific stage career, she appeared in productions in works by such varied international playwrights and authors as: William Shakespeare, Henrik Ibsen, Friedrich Schiller, Adolphe Adam, Maxim Gorky, Pierre Beaumarchais, Aleksis Kivi, Franz Grillparzer, Anton Chekhov, Konstantin Trenyov, and George Bernard Shaw. Luts also appeared in a number of roles in productions of works by Estonian authors and playwrights, including those of: Hugo Raudsepp, August Kitzberg, Hella Wuolijoki, A. H. Tammsaare, and August Jakobson.

=== Film ===
In 1947, Meta Luts was cast in the role of Mrs. Emilie Värihein in the Herbert Rappaport-directed Lenfilm drama Elu tsitadellis. Luts had performed the role on stage the year previously. The film was based on the 1946 play of the same name by Estonian author and communist politician August Jakobson and was the first post-World War II Estonian feature film following the annexation of Estonia into the Soviet Union. The plot largely revolves around the arrival of the Soviets following the German occupation of Estonia in 1944 and justice being meted out to Estonians who had collaborated with German occupying forces. The film ends with jubilant Estonians celebrating their "liberation" and inclusion into the Soviet Union; accepting the communist ideology. The film and was awarded the Stalin Prize. Other prominent film roles include that of Paula in the 1956 Viktor Nevežin-directed historical drama Tagahoovis, based on the 1933 story of the same name by author and playwright Oskar Luts (no relation), for Tallinna Kinostuudio (now, Tallinnfilm); and the role of Heli's grandmother in the 1957 Aleksandr Mandrõkin-directed drama Pöördel.

== Death ==
Meta Luts died in Tallinn at age 52. She had never married or had children. She was buried at Metsakalmistu in Tallinn.

== Acknowledgements ==
- Merited Artist of the Estonian SSR (1955)
