= Karin Luts =

Estonian painter and graphic artist (1904–1993)

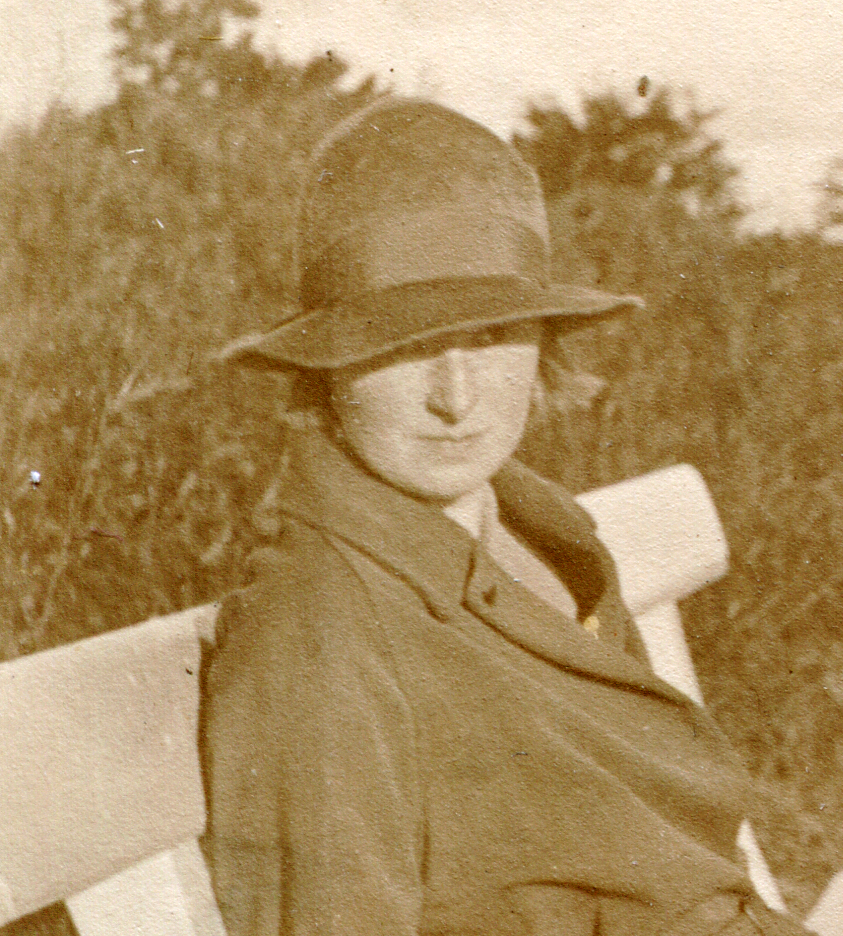
- Born: 29 April 1904; Riidaja Parish, Governorate of Livonia
- Died: 14 May 1993 (aged 89); Stockholm, Sweden
- Spouse: Peeter Arumaa
- Relatives: Meta Luts (sister); Julius Gentalen (cousin)

Karin Luts (29 April 1904 – 14 May 1993) was an Estonian painter and a graphic artist.

== Biography ==
Karin Luts was born in Riidaja in Valga County to parents Andres and Juuli Mari Luts (née Gentalen) in April 1904 where she was one of three sisters, Lonny, Meta and Karin, and a brother Elmar. Her father was a teacher. She completed her studies in Pärnu Estonian School Society Progymnasium in 1922. She had studied under artist Konstantin Süvalo. Luts then went to the Art College in Pallas, Tartu to study with Konrad Mägi. When Mägi died she continued with Ado Vabbe. Luts learned etching and lithography from Magnus Zeller. Luts graduated in 1928. In 1928 Luts spent a year at the Académie de la Grande Chaumière with André Lhote before returning to Estonia to work as an artist in Tallinn.

Luts worked as a costume designer and illustrator. One of her works was the illustrations for Eduard Visnapuu's children's book Loomade talu in 1933. She began to work with textile designs in 1935. The Ministry of Economy commissioned her to complete a tapestry design to be displayed in the Estonia pavilion of the Paris World's Fair in 1937. The work won a gold medal. She traveled to Finland and Denmark with Andrus Johani before she published her first article. Luts article was a critic of an exhibition of Italian women artists held in Tallinn in 1937. By 1939 Luts was part of the group of artists known as Pallas.

In 1939 Luts traveled through Rome with the Tallinn Women's Club where she took the opportunity to work in the studio of the artist Countess Mola. She had planned to return to Rome but the outbreak of the Second World War prevented it. She began working for the Konrad Mägi College of Art in 1940 as a lecturer. She married fellow professor Peter Arumaa and in 1944 they fled the soviet occupation of Estonia and went to Sweden. They both became citizens in the 1950s.

In Sweden Luts took up graphic design and gained recognition in painting and graphics internationally though she died relatively unknown having left Estonia as one of her best known women artists. She studied graphics from 1960 to 1968 in Stockholm and went on to study in Salzburg. She died in Stockholm in 1993. She left her art to the Tartu Art Museum and her writings to the Estonian Literary Museum.

Luts was married to linguist Peeter Arumaa. Her sister was the actress Meta Luts and her cousin was artist Julius Gentalen.

== Images ==
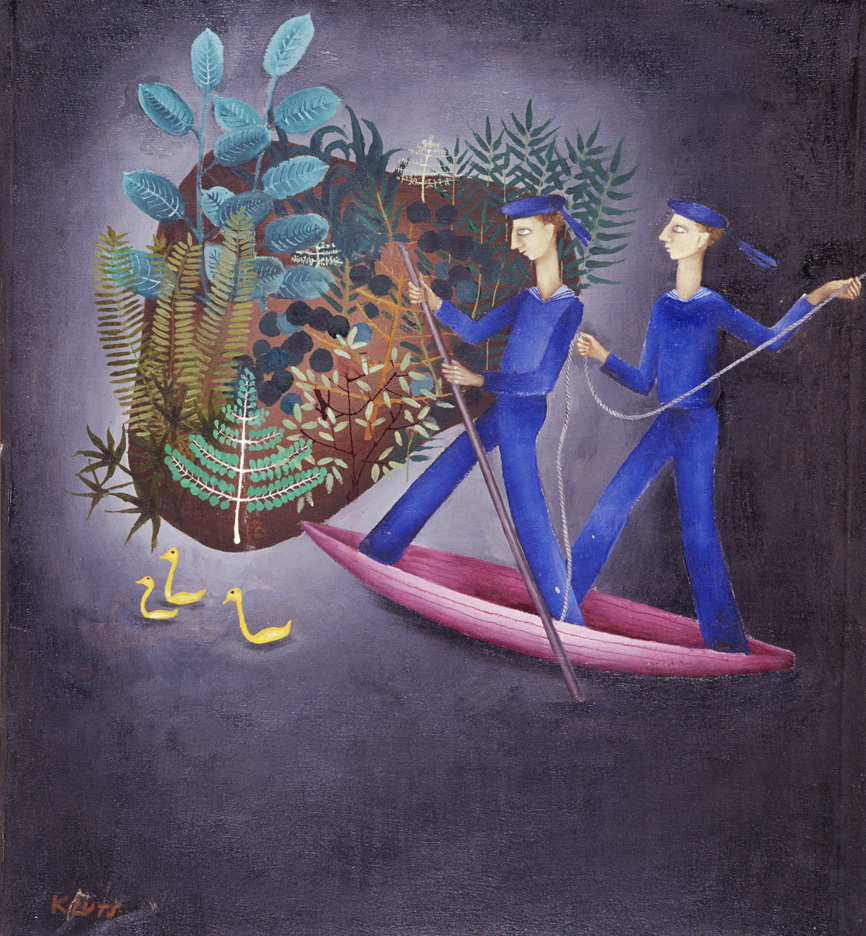
Kompositsioon. Õnnesaar, 1927

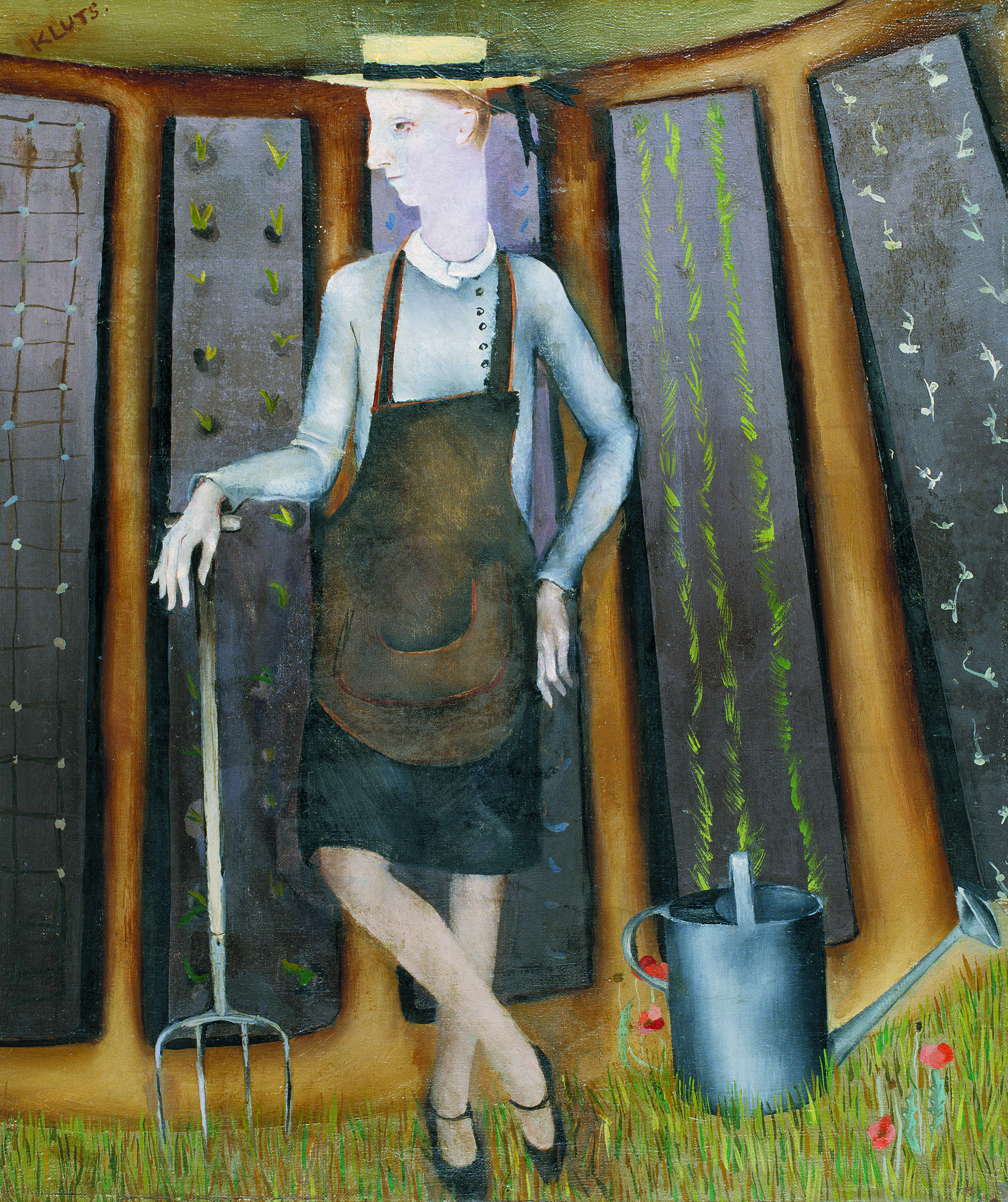
Aednik, 1928

Süüta laste tapmine, 1928

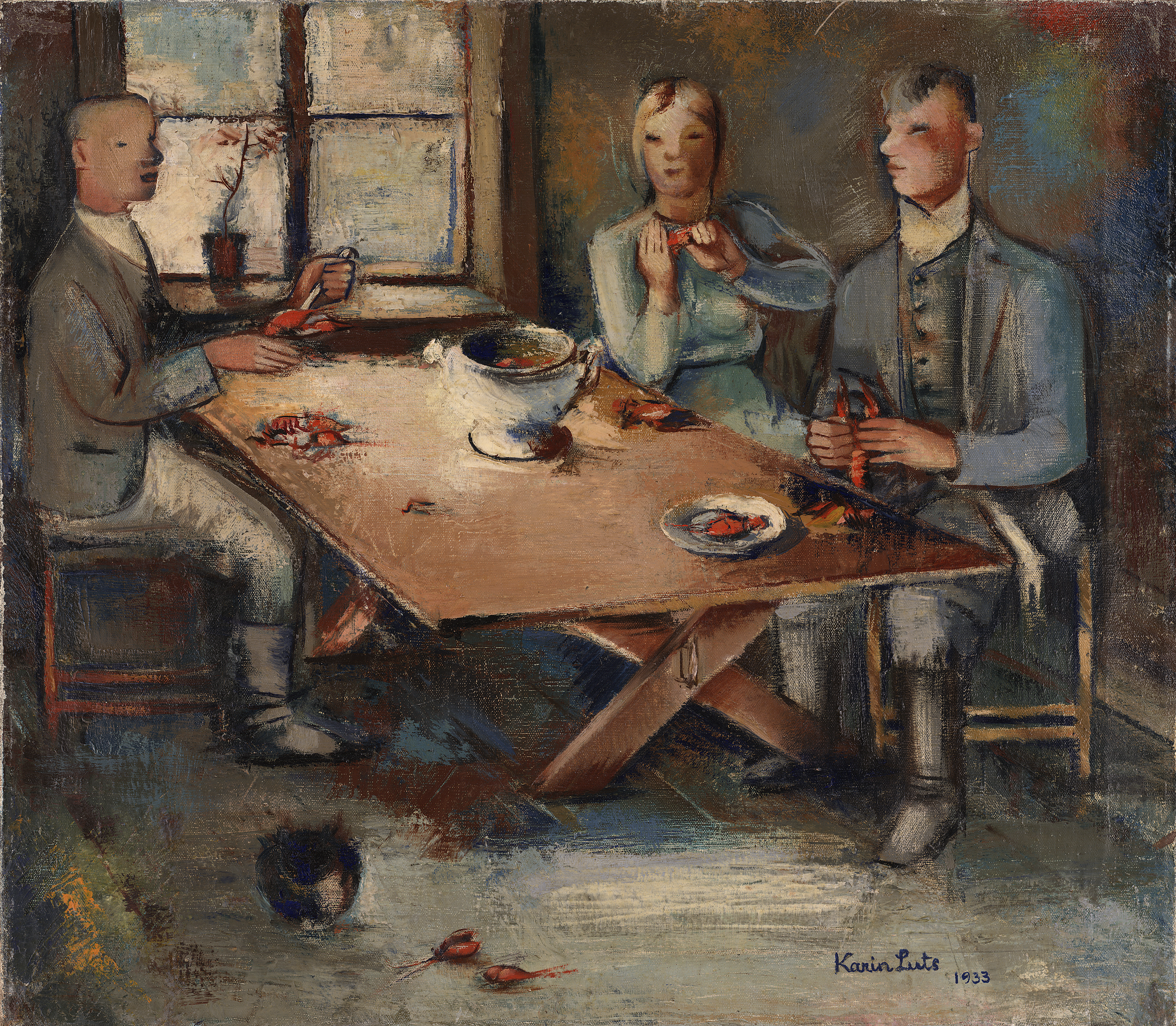
Vähjasööming, 1933

Leerilapsed, 1936

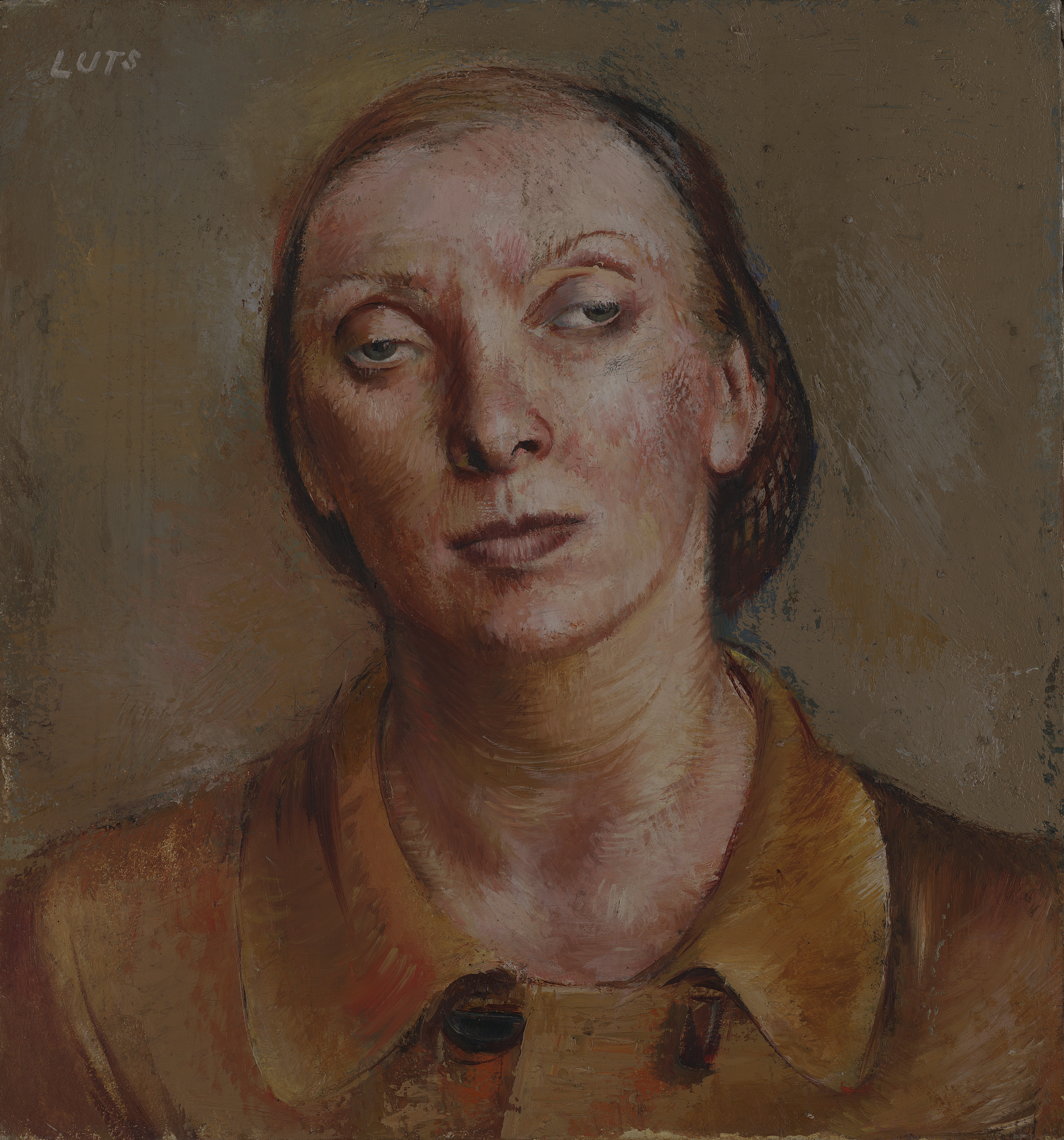
Self-portrait, 1939

Kaluritüdruk rannal, 1943

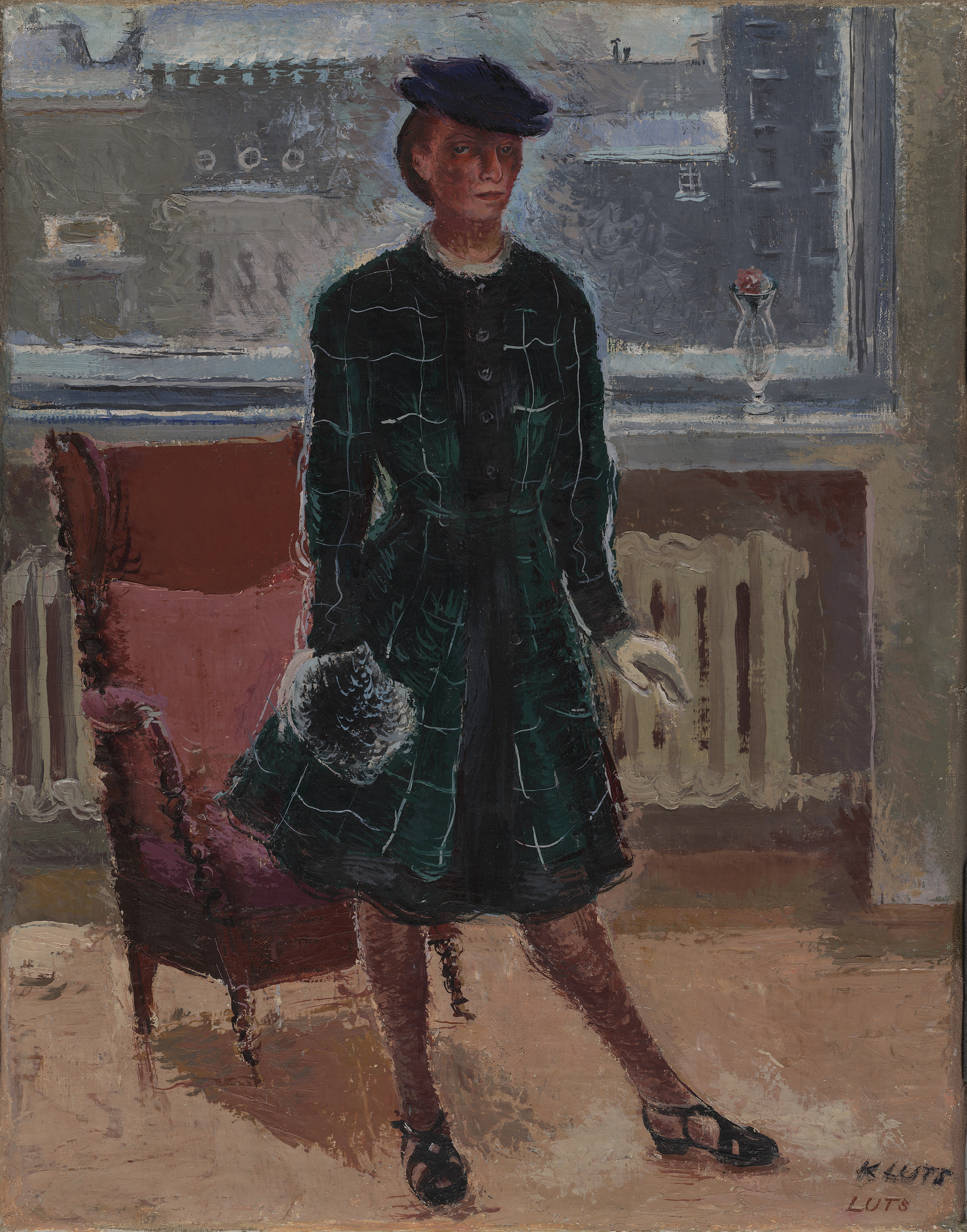
Self-portrait, 1943
