= Virve Kiple =

Estonian actor (1927-2009)

Virve Kiple (18 August 1927 – 2 September 2009) was an Estonian ballerina, actress, and director.

== Education ==
Kiple studied at Tiina Kapper Dance Studio from 1940 to 1942 and at the Vanemuine from 1942 to 1944.

== Career ==
Kiple made her debut at the Vanemuine in 1944. From 1948, she studied at the Russian Institute of Theatre Arts.

Kiple was selected as a model for the Golden Sheaf monumental Fountain in which she wore the national costume of Muhu.

Kiple was an actor at the Estonian Drama Theatre from 1953 to 1956. From 1958 to 1984 Kiple worked as a director for Eesti Televisioon. From 1956 to 1958 and from 1984 to 1986, Kiple was once again an actor at the Vanemuine.

After finishing her career as an actor and director, Kiple worked as an Estonian language teacher.

== Personal life ==
Kiple was married to Armenian-Estonian composer Boris Parsadanian.

Kiple is buried at Metsakalmistu.

== Selected stage roles ==
- Eleven Unknown by Nikita Bogoslovsky (1947)
- Barbarians by Maxim Gorky (1953)
- Fenja, In The Backyard by Oskar Luts
- Maret, Mikumärdi by Hugo Raudsepp
- Kersti, Exams by Liidia Kompus (1957)
- Keisrinna, A White Night by Tikhon Khrennikov (1984)
