= Riidaja Airfield =

Airfield in Estonia

Coordinates: 58°05′06″N 025°53′55″E

Riidaja Airfield (Estonian: Riidaja lennuväli; ICAO: EERD) is a private airfield in Riidaja, Valga County, Estonia.

The airfield's owner is Ants Taul.
