= Sergei Cheryomin =

- Сергей Черёмин

Personal details
- Born: 5 July 1963 (age 63) Kislovodsk, Stavropol Krai, Russian SFSR, Soviet Union
- Education: Moscow State Institute of International Relations
- Profession: statesman

Sergei Evgenievich Cheryomin (Russian: Сергей Евгеньевич Черёмин; born July 5, 1963, in Kislovodsk, Stavropol Krai) is a Russian businessman and statesman. He is a Minister of the Government of Moscow and head of the Department for External Economic and International Relations of Moscow.

== Biography ==
Cheryomin was born on July 5, 1963, in Kislovodsk, Stavropol Krai. In 1989, he graduated with honors from the Moscow State Institute of International Relations (MGIMO) with a degree in international journalism and completed his postgraduate studies at the Faculty of International Economic Relations at Moscow State University (MGU) with a specialization in world economics. In 2003, he defended his dissertation on "New Directions and Forms of Russia's Integration into the World Economy," earning a Candidate of Science degree.

In 1989, he began his career at the newspaper Pravda as a special correspondent in the international information department. He worked there for two years.

From 1991 to 1992, he served as the First Deputy Chairman of the Board of Directors of Printbank.

In 1992, he was appointed chairman of the Board of Moscow Export-Import Bank (Moseximbank), a position he held until 1998.

In 1992, he interned at New York University as part of a program on Investments and International Settlements, and in 1993, he completed an internship at Fairfield University (Fairfield, CT) as part of a program for banking specialists.

In 1998, he joined the Board of Directors of Zheldorbank.

From 1998 to 2000, he was Vice President of Ural Trust Bank.

In 2000, he became an advisor to the President of Commercial bank "Severo-Vostochny Alliance", later becoming the President. He left the company in 2003.

From 2004 to 2005, he served as chairman of the Board of Directors of the Moscow Bank for Reconstruction and Development (MBRD) and chairman of the Board of Directors of East-West United Bank (Luxembourg).

From 2005 to 2009, he was chairman of the Board of Directors of MBRD as well as Senior Vice President and head of foreign relations at AFK Sistema JSFC.

In 2009, he became deputy chairman of the Board of Directors of AFK Sistema, overseeing the Group's activities in Russia and abroad. His responsibilities included forming the agenda for the board of directors.

In 2009, he joined the Intergovernmental Russian-Indian Commission on Trade, Economic, Scientific, Technical and Cultural Cooperation.

The same year, he became Chairman of the Business Council for Cooperation with India, later taking the post of deputy chairman in 2015.

Since 2010, he has been a Minister of the Government of Moscow and the head of the Department for External Economic and International Relations of Moscow (for the term of the Mayor of Moscow).

In this role, he is responsible for Moscow's foreign economic activities and attracting investments to the capital. His duties also include participating in congressional and exhibition activities, engaging with international organizations, supporting foreign businesses in localizing in Moscow, interacting with city government departments, structuring complex foreign economic contracts, and more. Notably, Sergei Cheryomin has modernized the department's structure, and under his leadership, the city has signed memoranda of cooperation with Berlin, Rio de Janeiro, and Dublin.

He is also President of the Moscow Golf Federation.

== Awards ==
- Order of the Star of Italy, Commander degree (June 2, 2013, Italy)
- Gold Medal of Yerevan for significant contributions to strengthening and developing friendly relations between Yerevan and Moscow
- Certificate of Honor of the Government of the Russian Federation (2010)
- Certificate of Gratitude of the Mayor of Moscow (2013)
- Gold Medal of the Mayor of Yerevan (2013)
- Order of Merit of the Grand Duchy of Luxembourg, Commander degree
- Order of Civil Merit of Spain, Commander degree
- Jubilee Medal “70 Years of the Russian Nuclear Industry” (2015)
- Badge “For Cooperation” from the Ministry of Foreign Affairs of the Russian Federation (2016)
- Certificate of Honor of the President of the Russian Federation
- Honorary Jubilee Badge “Moscow City Duma: 25 Years”
- Commemorative medal for significant contributions to organizing the Russia-Africa Summit and Economic Forum (2019)
- Order of Friendship
- Badge “For Contributions to International Cooperation” from the Ministry of Foreign Affairs of the Russian Federation (2023)
- Badge of Distinction “For Impeccable Service to the City of Moscow” (2023)
- Certificate of Honor of the Moscow City Duma (2023)
- Medal of Distinction of the Government of Moscow “For the Development of Moscow Sports” (2023)
