= Fuat Mansurov =

Soviet and Russian conductor (1928–2010)

Fuat Mansurov Tatar: Фуат Шакир улы Мансуров Russian: Фуат Шакирович Мансуров
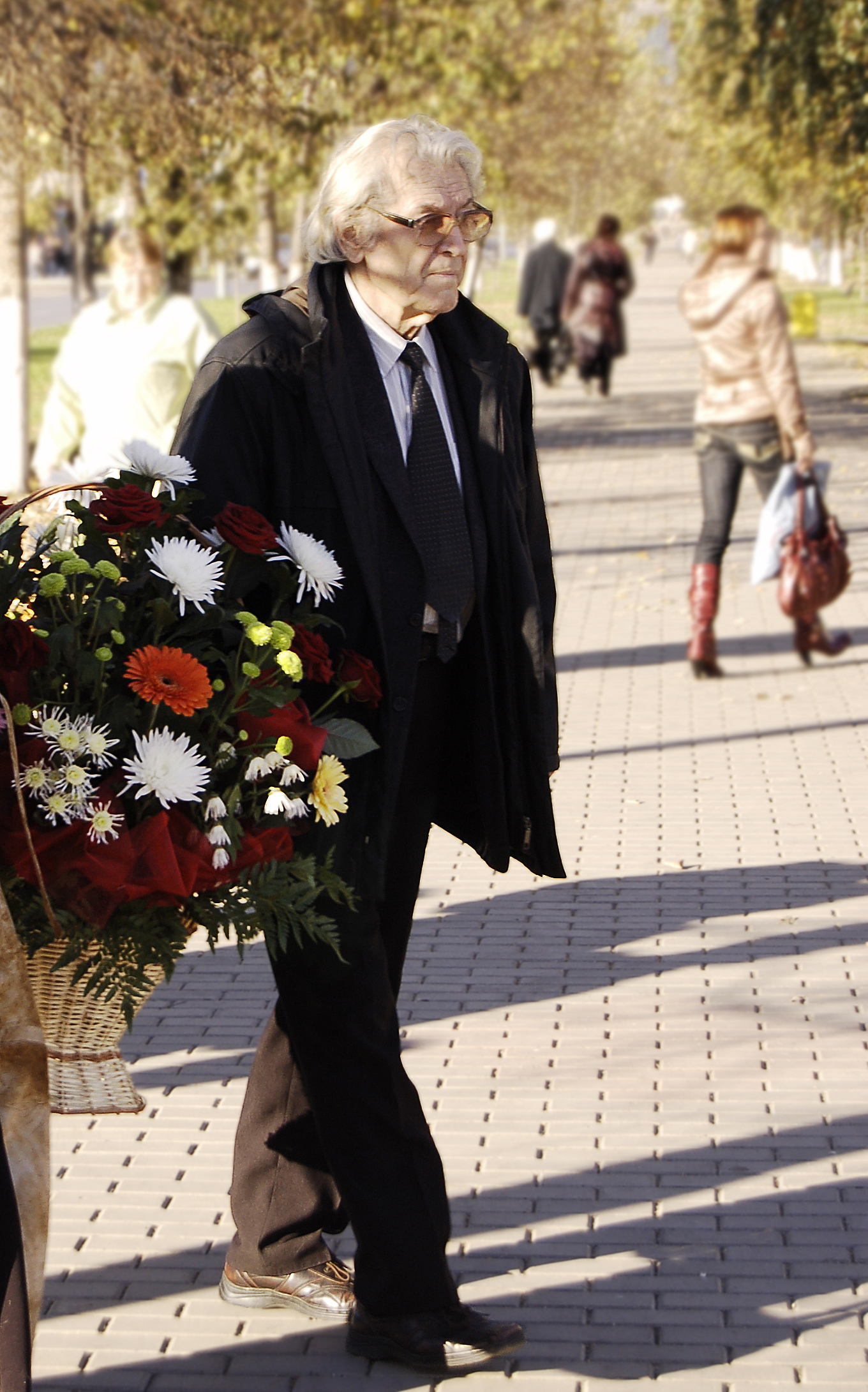
- Maestro Fuat Mansurov participates in the wreath-laying ceremony to the Ğabdulla Tuqay memorial on October 3, 2007 in Almetyevsk, Republic of Tatarstan, Russia

Background information
- Born: January 10, 1928; Almaty, RSFSR, Soviet Union
- Died: June 12, 2010 (aged 82) Moscow, Russia
- Genres: Classical
- Occupation: Conductor

Fuat Mansurov (Tatar: Фоат Шакир улы Мансуров, Russian: Фуат Шакирович Мансуров; January 10, 1928 – June 12, 2010) was a Soviet and Russian conductor.

== Biography ==
Mansurov was born in Almaty. He graduated from Al-Farabi University in 1950 as a mathematician and then became a faculty member of the School of Math and Sciences there.

In 1951 Mansurov graduated from Kurmangazy Kazakh National Conservatory in Almaty, as a conductor. While at Kurmangazy Conservatory, he studied under Achmet Kujanowitsch Schubanow and Isidor Zach and then took his Doctoral studies at the Moscow Conservatory under Leo Ginzburg. Then Mansurov became an assistant conductor to Igor Markevitch.

== Career ==
Between 1949 - 1952 Mansurov was a conductor of the Kurmangazy Kazakh Orchestra of Folk Instruments and then he became a conductor of Kazakh Radio Symphony Orchestra. Since 1951 Mansurov became a faculty member of the Kurmangazy Kazakh National Conservatory in Almaty.

In 1958 Mansurov became a founding member of the Kazakh National Symphony Orchestra. He held a position of Music Director and Principal Conductor with this orchestra till 1962. With this orchestra, Mansurov toured Germany, Poland, and Italy.

Between 1953 - 1956 and then between 1963 - 1968 Mansurov worked as an opera and ballet conductor of the Abay Opera House. In 1966 he won the second All-Union Conductors Competition.

Since 1968 Mansurov became a Principal Conductor and Artistic Director of the Tatar State Academic Opera and Ballet Theatre named after Musa Cälil. Since 1969 Mansurov became a conductor of Moscow Bolshoi Theatre.

In 1970 Mansurov became a Professor of Moscow Conservatory and in 1986 became a Professor of Kazan Conservatory in Kazan. From 1989 and till his death in 2010, Mansurov was a Principal Conductor and Music Director of Tatar State Symphony Orchestra in Kazan.

He was a People's Artist of Russia, Tatarstan, and Kazakhstan.

In 1991 Mansurov conducted the Bolshoi at the New York Metropolitan Opera for performances of Mlada and Eugene Onegin.

== Death ==
He died at the age of 82 in Moscow.
