= Voldemar Puhk =

Estonian politician

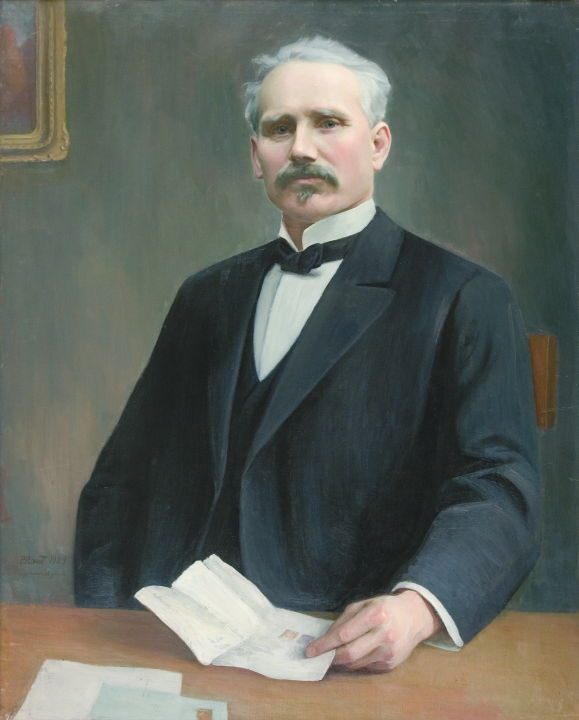
Portrait of Voldemar Puhk by Paul Raud (1929)

Voldemar Puhk (11 December 1897, Viljandi – 3 May 1937, Tallinn) was an Estonian diplomat, businessman, economist and politician.

From 1918 to 1919, he was the acting Minister of Commerce and Industry. He is buried at Tallinn's Forest Cemetery.
