= Kislovodsk =

City in Stavropol Krai, Russia

Kislovodsk Кисловодск
- City
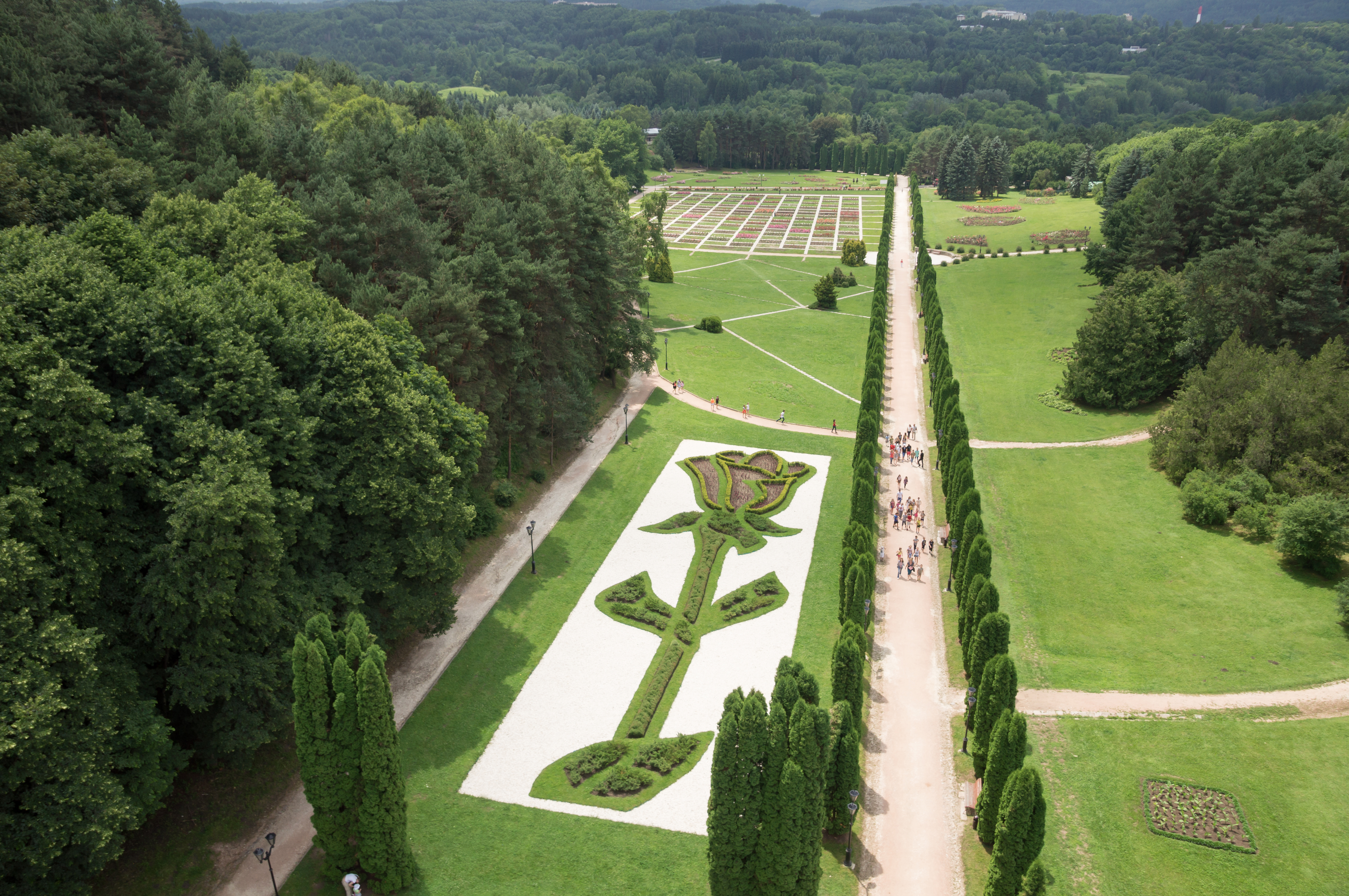
- Kislovodsk National Park, Kislovodsk

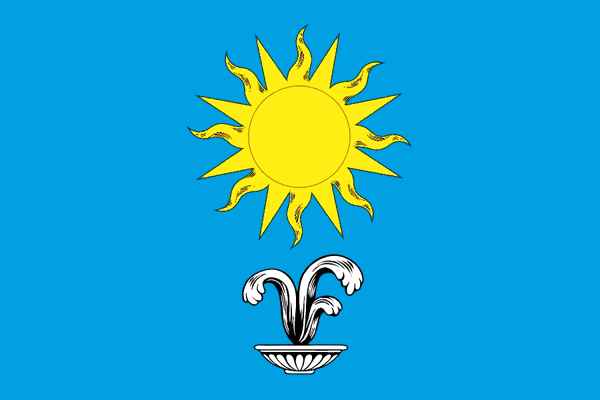
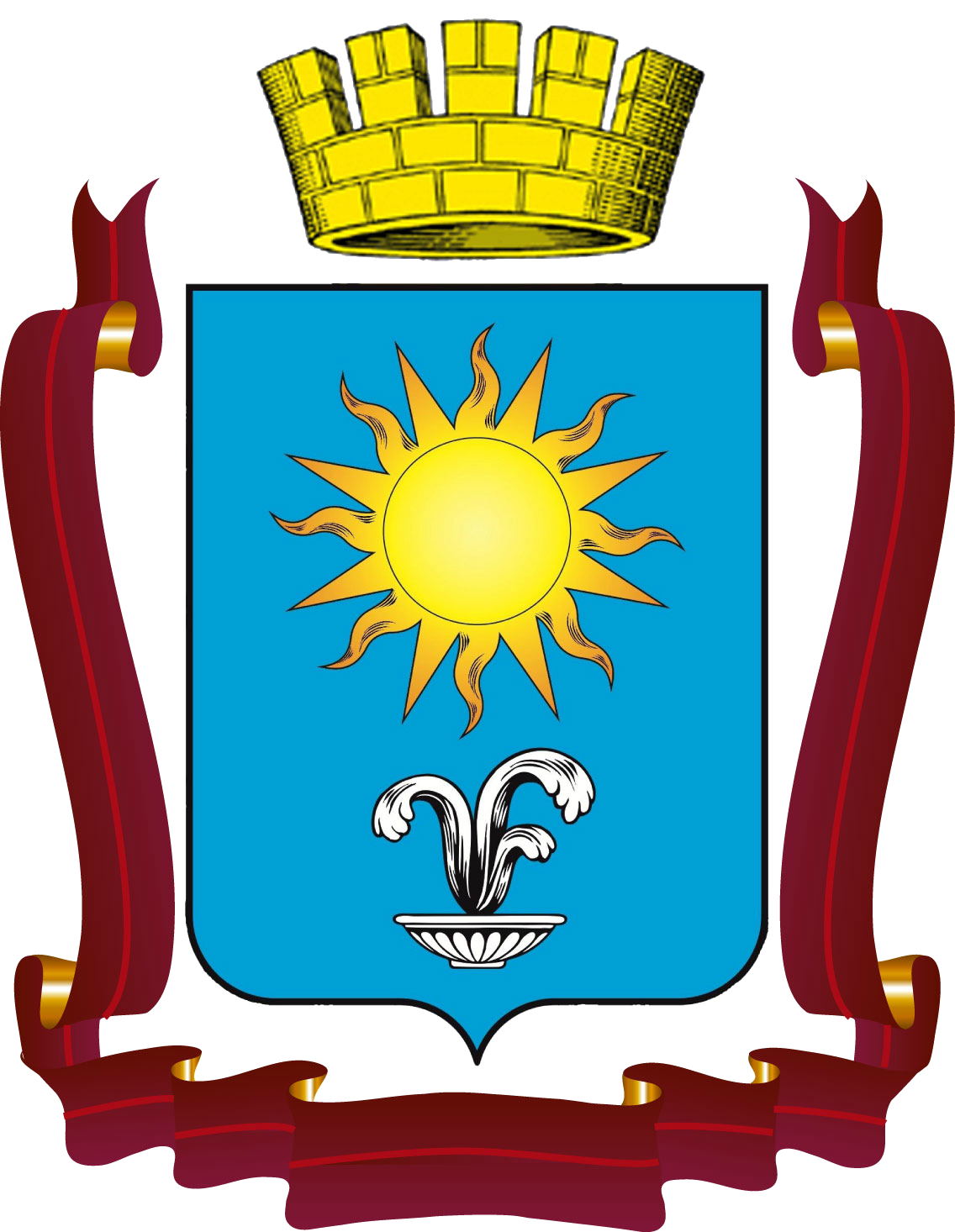
- Flag Coat of arms
- Interactive map of Kislovodsk
- Location of Kislovodsk Kislovodsk (Stavropol Krai)
- Coordinates: 43°55′N 42°43′E
- Country: Russia
- Federal subject: Stavropol Krai
- Founded: 1803
- City status since: 1903

Government
  - Body: Council of Deputies
  - Head: Evgeny Moiseev

Area
  - Total: 72 km^{2} (28 sq mi)
- Elevation: 815 m (2,674 ft)

Population (2010 Census)
  - Total: 128,553
  - Estimate (2025): 125,931 (−2%)
  - Rank: 128th in 2010
  - Density: 1,800/km^{2} (4,600/sq mi)

Administrative status
  - Subordinated to: city of krai significance of Kislovodsk
  - Capital of: city of krai significance of Kislovodsk

Municipal status
  - Urban okrug: Kislovodsk Urban Okrug
  - Capital of: Kislovodsk Urban Okrug
- Time zone: UTC+3 (MSK)
- Postal code: 357700
- Dialing code: +7 87937
- OKTMO ID: 07715000001
- City Day: last Saturday in May
- Website: kislovodsk-kurort.org

Kislovodsk (Russian: Кислово́дск; Kabardian: Нартсанэ; Karachay-Balkar: Ачысуу) is a spa city in Stavropol Krai, in the North Caucasus region of Russia which is located between the Black and Caspian Seas. It is part of the Caucasian Mineral Waters region.

== Demographics ==
Population: 128,553 (2010 census); 129,788 (2002 census); 114,414 (1989 Soviet census).

== Etymology ==
The Russian-language name of the city translates as "sour water" and originated due to the abundance of narzan mineral-water (Russian: нарзан, romanized: narzan) springs in the area.

== History ==
The settlement gained town status in 1903. Several of the events in Mikhail Lermontov's 1840 novel A Hero of Our Time take place in Kislovodsk.

== Archaeology ==
Numerous settlements of the Koban culture (ca. 1100 to 400 BC) are found in the Kislovodsk city and its surroundings. They include the sites of Industria I, Sultan-gora I, Berezovka I, Berezovka II, Berezovka III, Berezovka IV.

== Administrative and municipal status ==
Within the framework of administrative divisions, it is, together with seven rural localities, incorporated as the city of krai significance of Kislovodsk—an administrative unit with the status equal to that of the districts. As a municipal division, the city of krai significance of Kislovodsk is incorporated as Kislovodsk Urban Okrug.

== Geography ==
The city is located in the North Caucasus region of Russia which is located between the Black and Caspian Seas.

=== Climate ===
Climate data for Kislovodsk (extremes 1886-present)
Month	Jan	Feb	Mar	Apr	May	Jun	Jul	Aug	Sep	Oct	Nov	Dec	Year
Record high °C (°F)	18.5 (65.3)	20.9 (69.6)	27.7 (81.9)	32.3 (90.1)	34.2 (93.6)	35.2 (95.4)	36.2 (97.2)	36.4 (97.5)	36.0 (96.8)	31.1 (88.0)	26.3 (79.3)	24.4 (75.9)	36.4 (97.5)
Mean daily maximum °C (°F)	3.6 (38.5)	5.1 (41.2)	9.0 (48.2)	14.4 (57.9)	19.1 (66.4)	22.6 (72.7)	25.1 (77.2)	25.2 (77.4)	21.0 (69.8)	16.0 (60.8)	9.7 (49.5)	5.2 (41.4)	14.7 (58.4)
Daily mean °C (°F)	−2.2 (28.0)	−1.4 (29.5)	2.6 (36.7)	7.9 (46.2)	12.9 (55.2)	16.6 (61.9)	19.1 (66.4)	18.9 (66.0)	14.5 (58.1)	9.3 (48.7)	3.2 (37.8)	0.6 (33.1)	8.5 (47.3)
Mean daily minimum °C (°F)	−6.1 (21.0)	−5.7 (21.7)	−1.8 (28.8)	3.1 (37.6)	7.9 (46.2)	11.4 (52.5)	13.8 (56.8)	13.6 (56.5)	9.3 (48.7)	4.5 (40.1)	−1.0 (30.2)	−4.6 (23.7)	3.7 (38.7)
Record low °C (°F)	−24.4 (−11.9)	−26.2 (−15.2)	−18.0 (−0.4)	−13.1 (8.4)	−3.8 (25.2)	−0.4 (31.3)	4.2 (39.6)	4.6 (40.3)	−6.0 (21.2)	−11.5 (11.3)	−25.0 (−13.0)	−28.9 (−20.0)	−28.9 (−20.0)
Average precipitation mm (inches)	19.2 (0.76)	18.9 (0.74)	38.7 (1.52)	60.3 (2.37)	106.8 (4.20)	123.1 (4.85)	95.8 (3.77)	62.6 (2.46)	60.3 (2.37)	37.8 (1.49)	27.2 (1.07)	23.1 (0.91)	673.8 (26.51)
Source: pogoda.ru.net

== In literature ==
Several of the events in Mikhail Lermontov's 1840 novel A Hero of Our Time take place in Kislovodsk.

== Notable people ==
Nobel Prize winner Aleksandr Solzhenitsyn (1918-2008) was a native of Kislovodsk. A museum was planned in the house he was born. Renovations were to begin in 2011. Nikolai Yaroshenko's (1846-1898) memorial house is open to the public.

The Ukrainian historian Mykhailo Hrushevskyi (1866-1934) died in exile in Kislovodsk.

- Arthur Adamov was a playwright, one of the foremost exponents of the Theatre of the Absurd of Armenian descent
- Zuhra Bayramkulova (1940–2013), farmer and politician, was born there.
- Sergei Cheryomin (born 1963), businessman and government official
- Felix Feodosidi (born 1933), wine maker
- Nikolai Levashov, psychic healer, occultist and writer
- Boris Parsadanian, composer, was born there.
- Karine Shadoyan, wrestler born in Kislovodsk who represented Armenia
- Pyotr Mikhailovich Skarzhinsky (1747 - 1805) Russian Major General, and Governor of Caucasian Governorate 1793-1796. He owned a Gothic-style mansion in Kislovodsk.

== Twin towns and sister cities ==
Kislovodsk is twinned with:

- Aix-les-Bains, France
- Baguio, Philippines
- (Georgia (country)) Batumi, Georgia
- Kiryat Yam, Israel
- Muscatine, Iowa, United States
- Nazran, Republic of Ingushetia, Russia
- Velingrad, Bulgaria

== Gallery ==
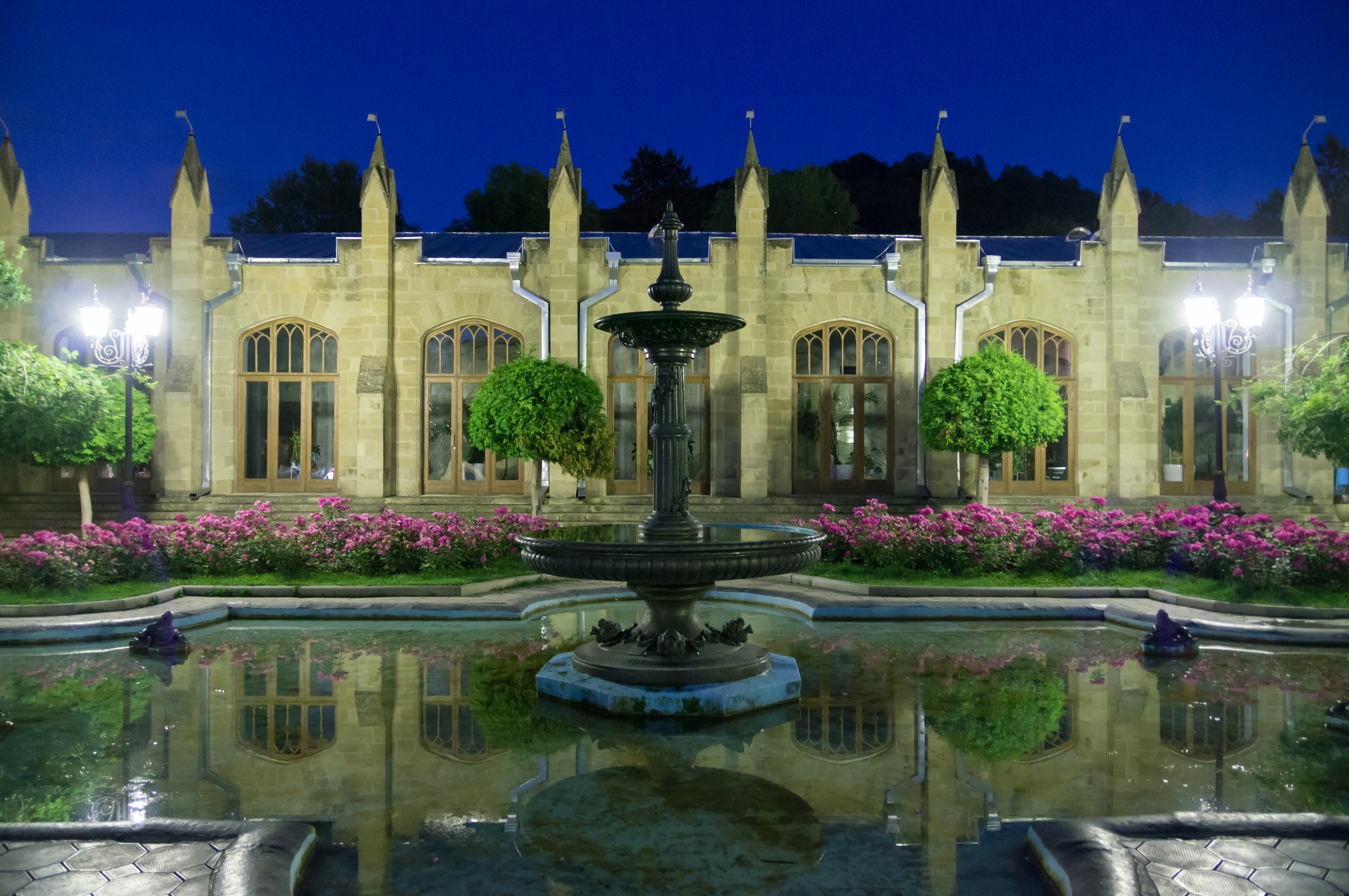
Narzan Gallery

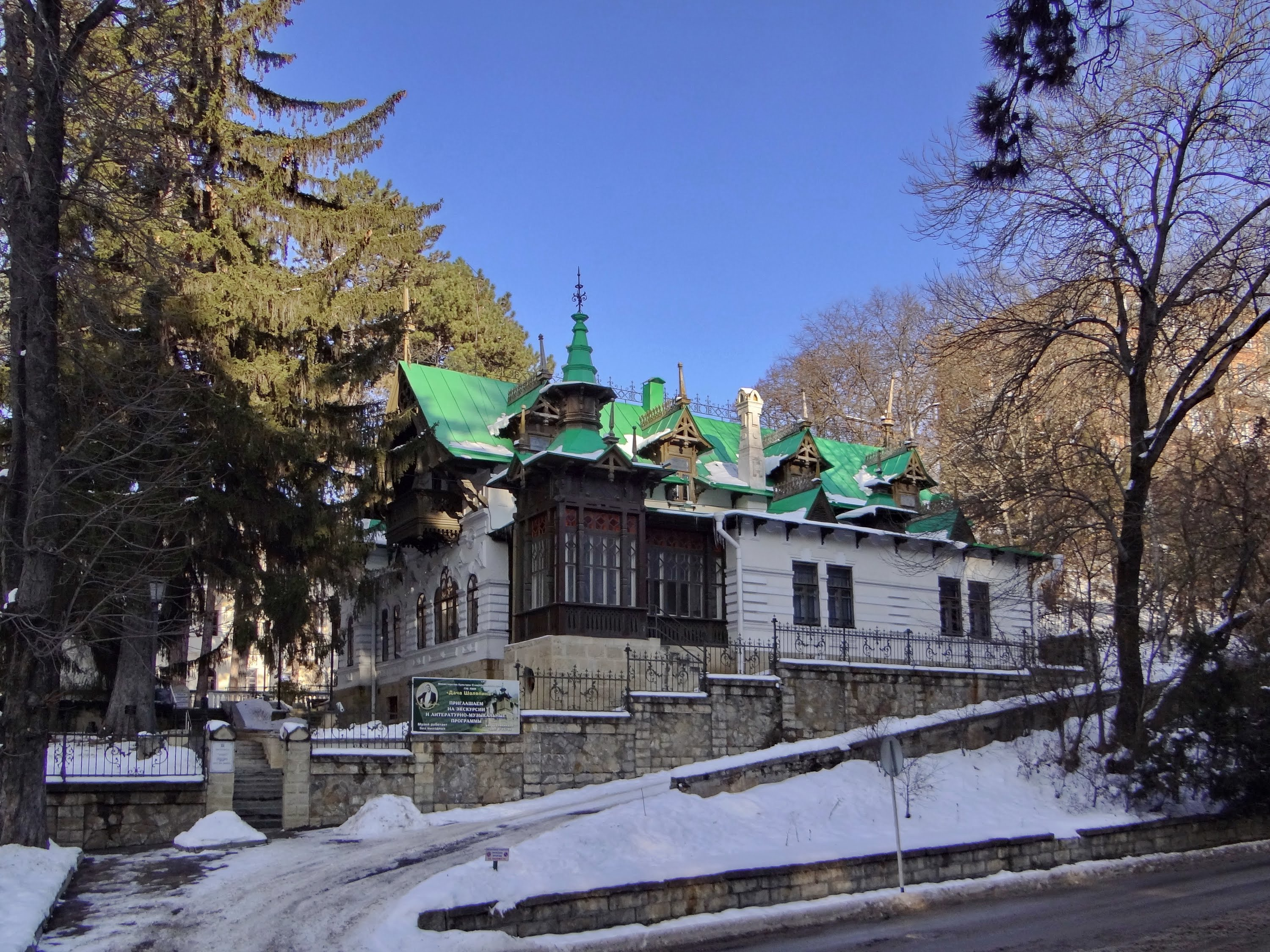
Chaliapin’s Mansion

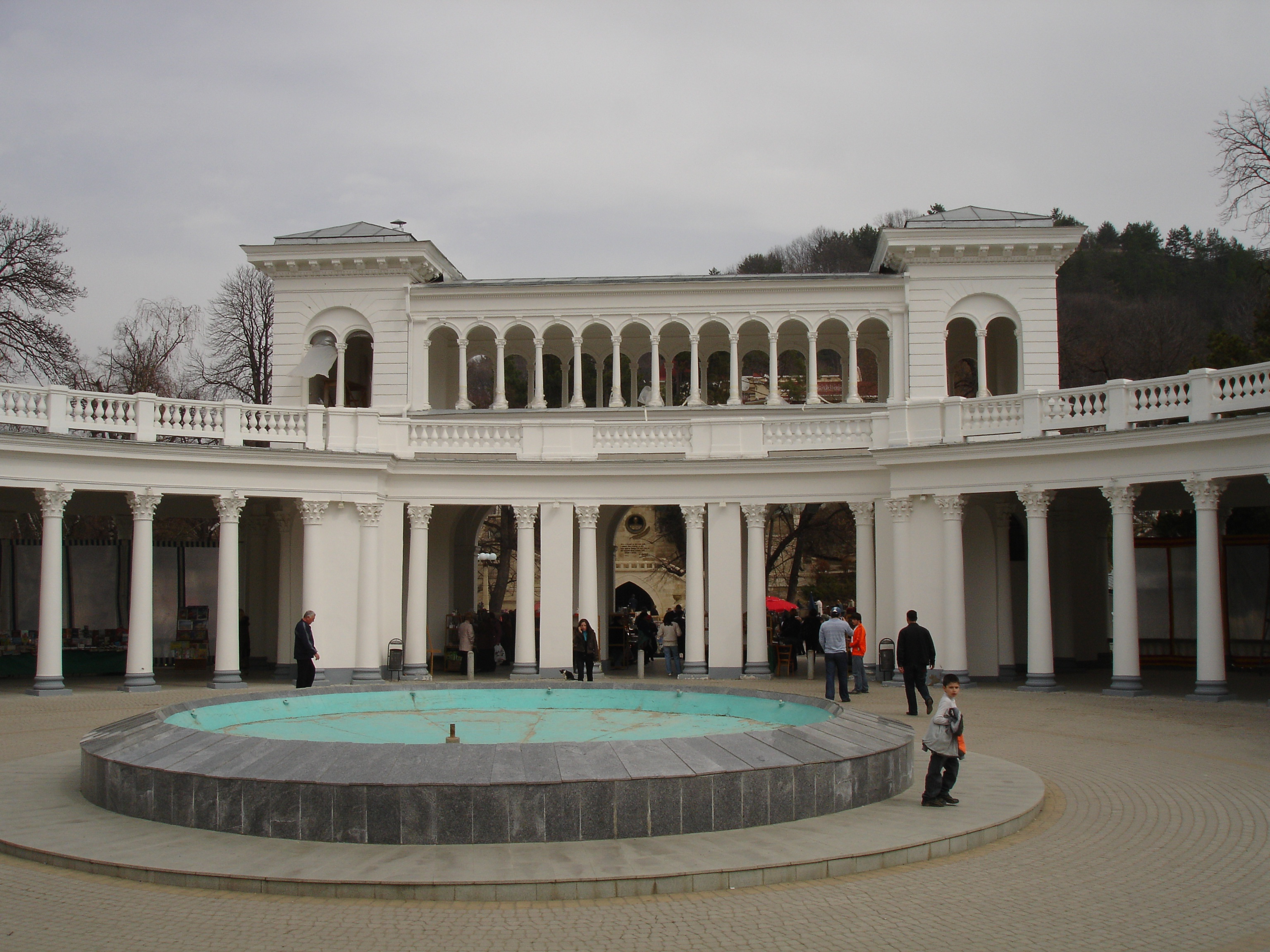
Kislovodsk Colonnade

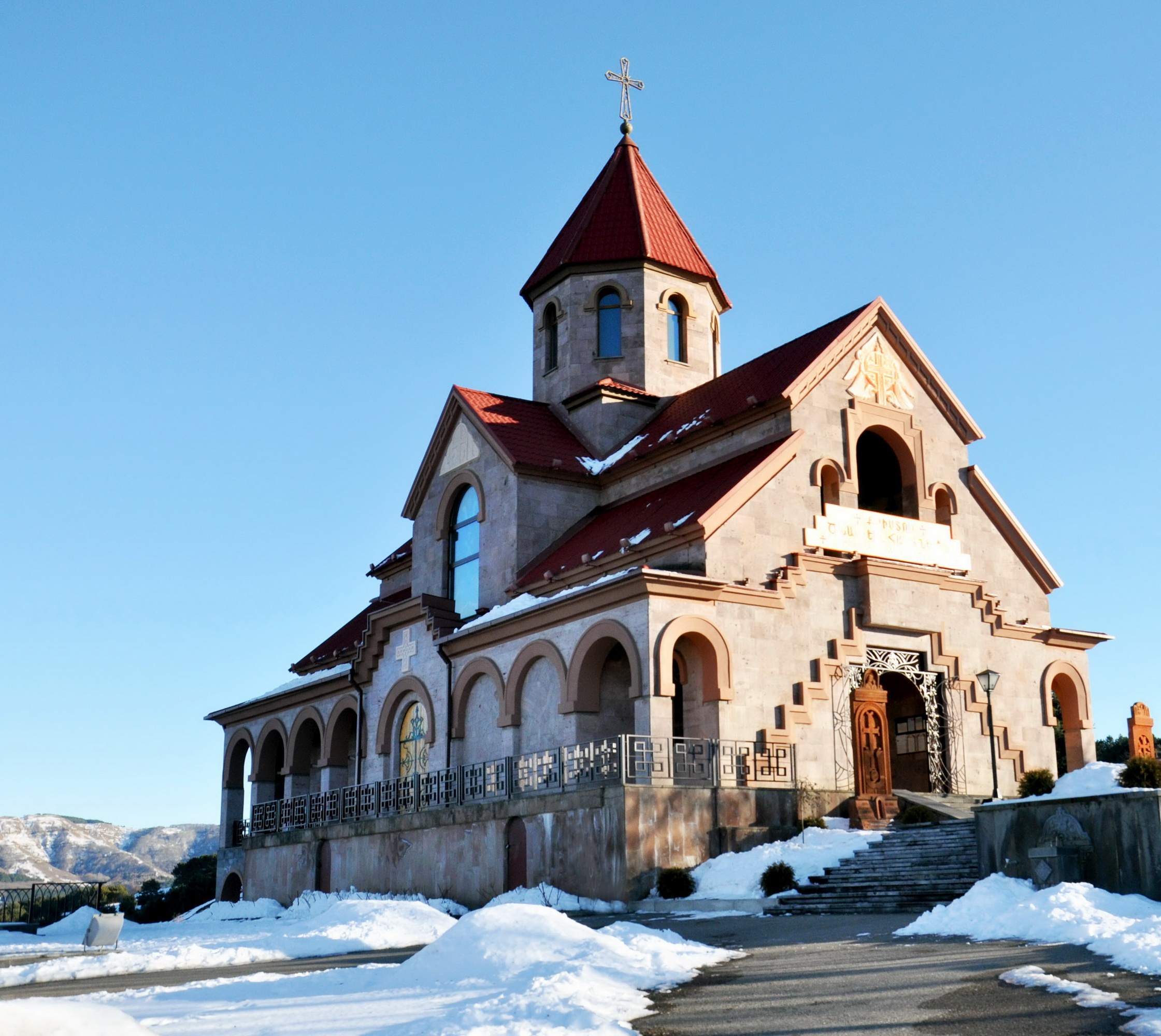
Armenian Church

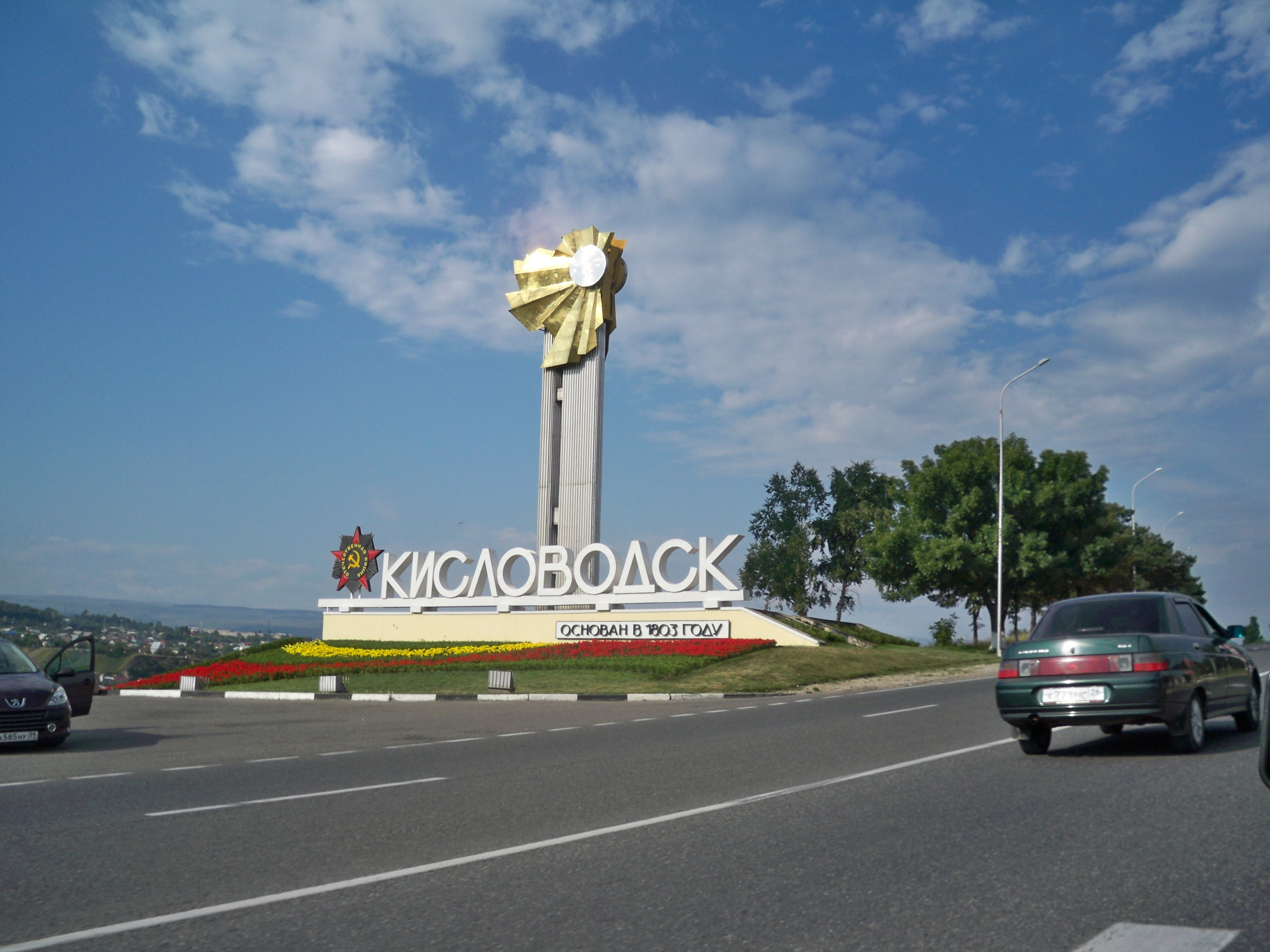
Welcome to Kislovodsk

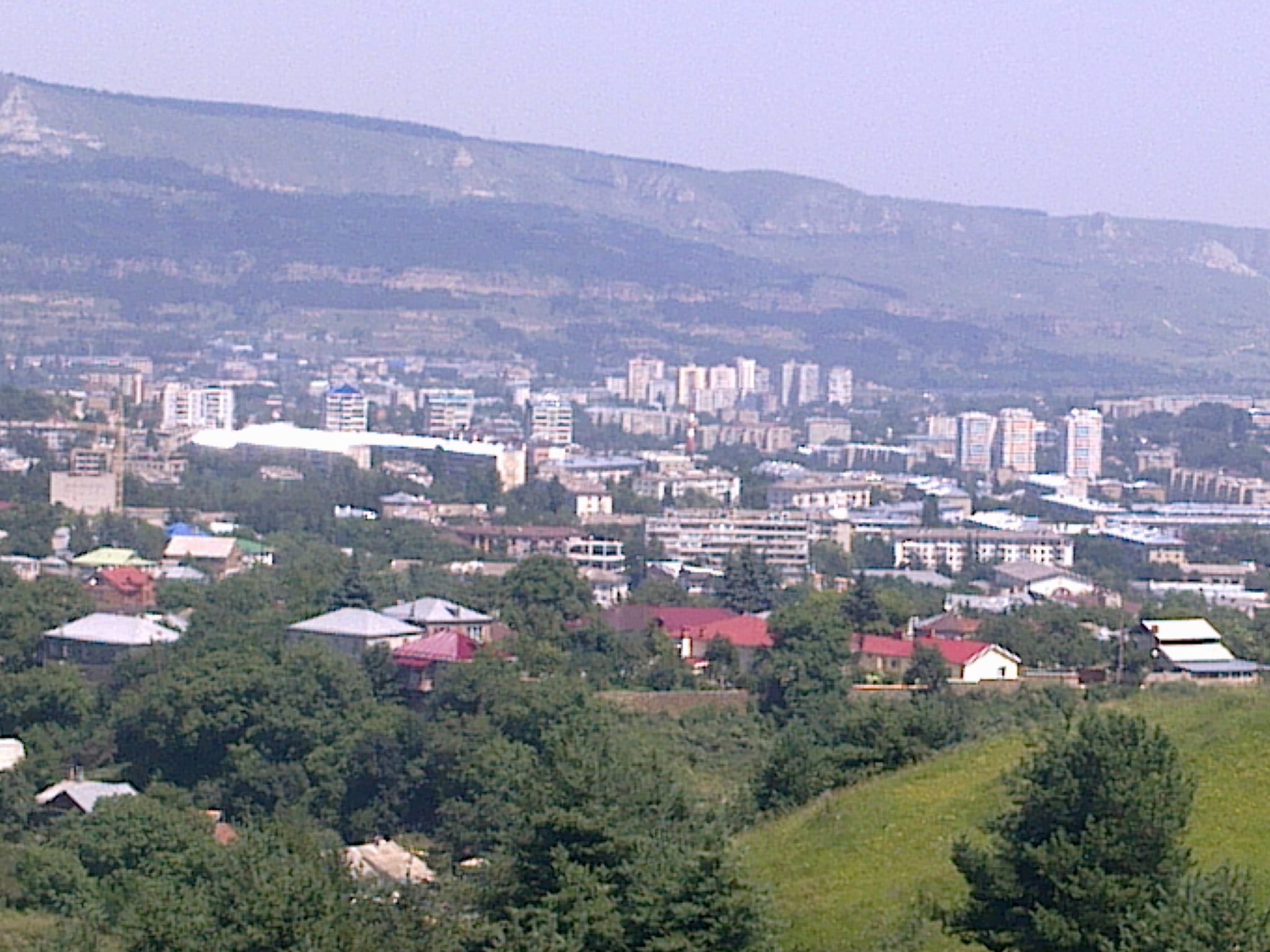
View of Kislovodsk

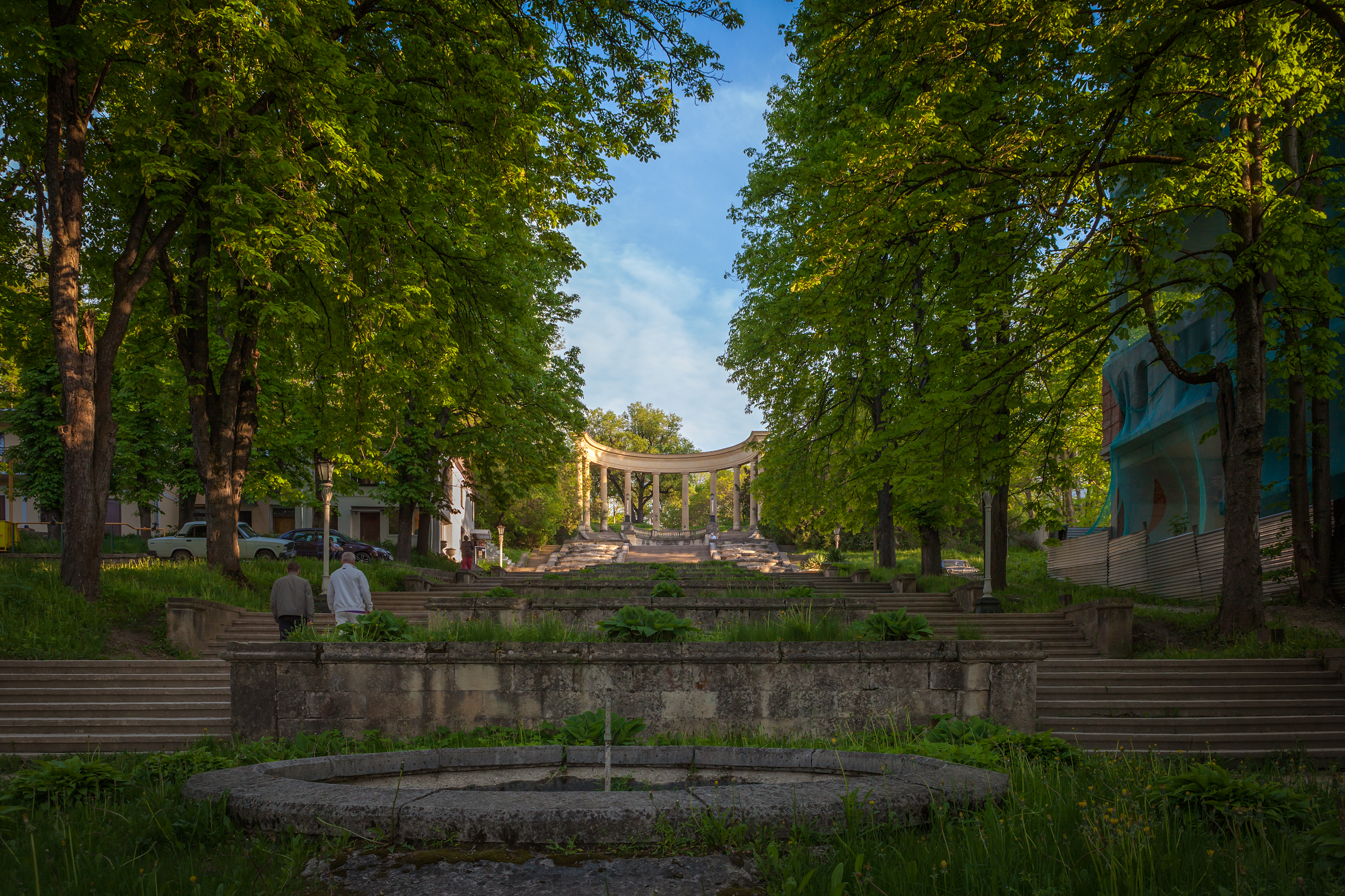
The Cascade Staircase in Kislovodsk

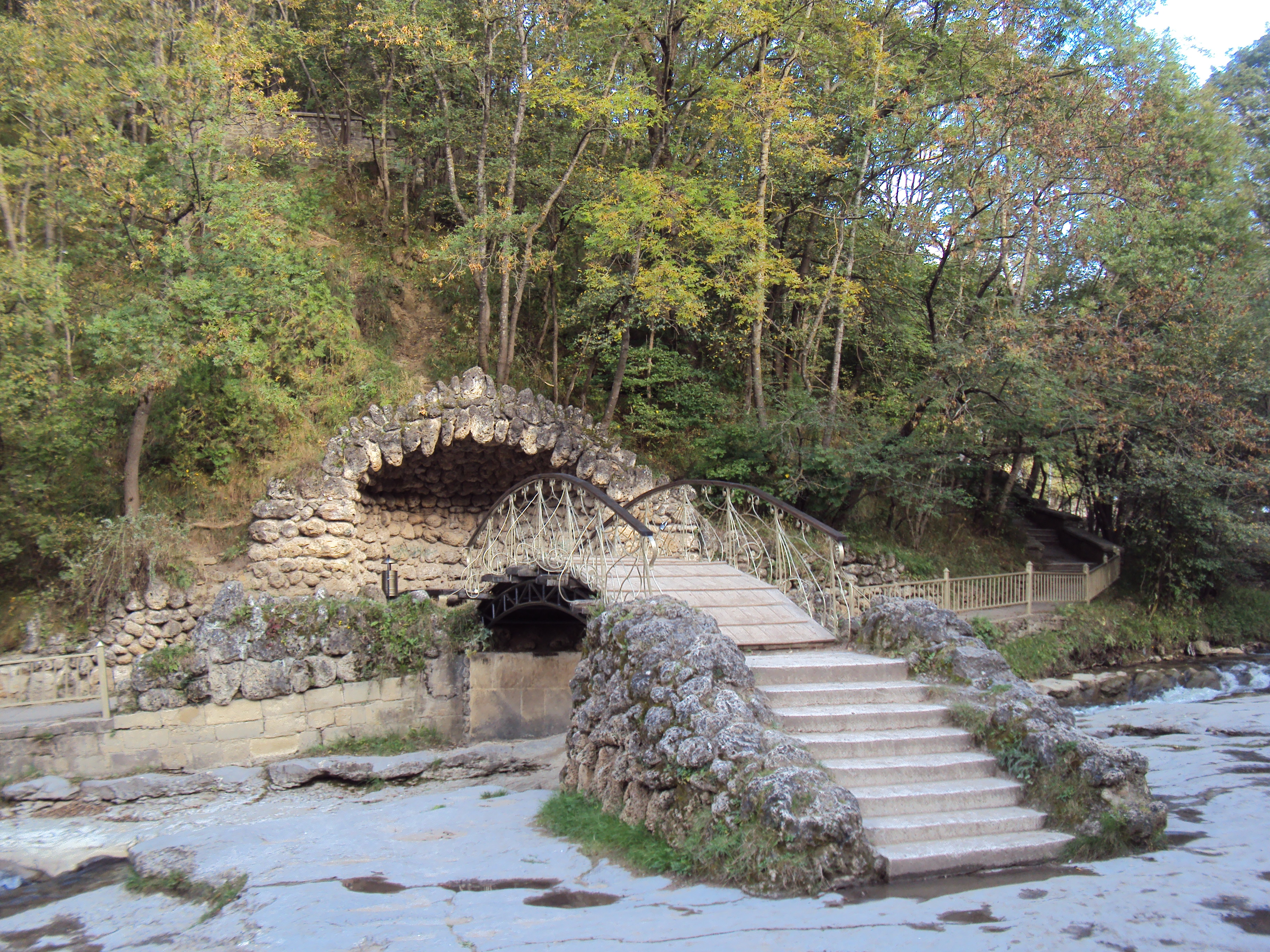
The pedestrian bridge - "Lady's Whim"

== See also ==
- History of the Jews in Kislovodsk
