= Konstantin Ivanov (conductor) =

Soviet conductor (1907–1984)

Konstantin Ivanov Константин Иванов
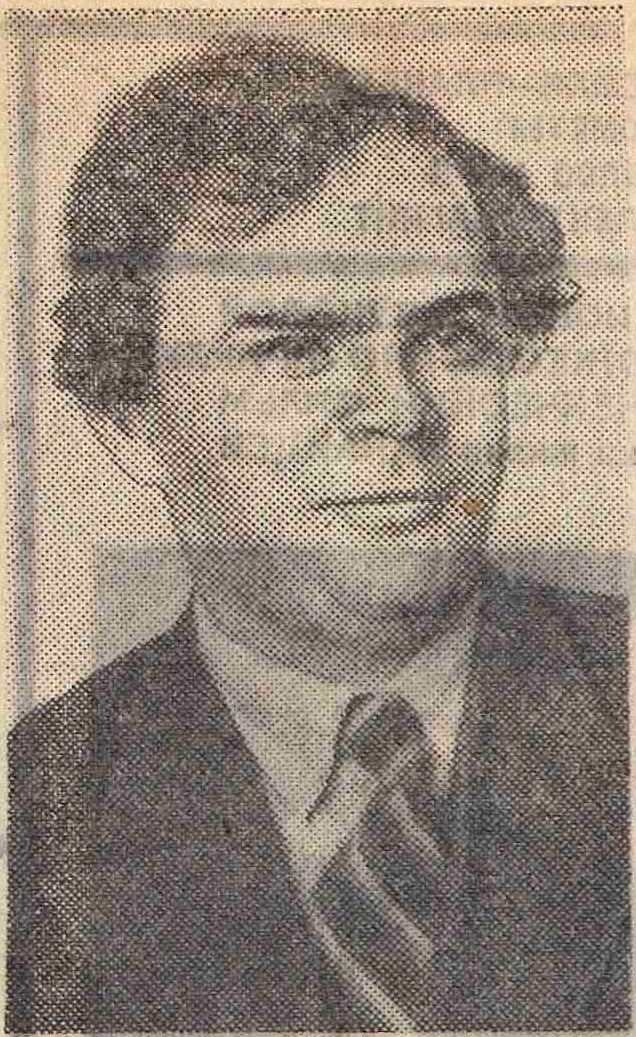
- Ivanov in 1938

Background information
- Born: 8 May 1907 [O.S. 21 May] Yefremov, Tula Governorate, Russian Empire
- Died: 15 April 1984 (aged 76) Moscow, Russian SFSR, Soviet Union
- Genres: Classical
- Occupations: Conductor; composer
- Instrument: Trumpet

Konstantin Konstantinovich Ivanov (Note: Russian: Константин Константинович Иванов, romanized: Konstantin Konstantinovich Ivanov) (21 May 1907 [O.S. 8 May] – 15 April 1984) was a Soviet conductor and composer.

== Career ==
A brief article in The Great Soviet Encyclopaedia says he was born on May 8, 1907, in the town of Yefremov or Efremov (Russian: Ефре́мов) in the Tula Oblast. At the age of 13, he was adopted by a regiment of the Red Army. He became a trumpeter in army orchestras. He attended the Moscow Conservatory where he studied conducting with the conductor L. M. Ginzburg. Ivanov graduated in 1937, and the following year won the third prize at the first edition of the All-Union Conductors Competition. Engagements with the Bolshoi Theatre and the All-Union Radio Symphony Orchestra followed in 1941.

In 1945, Ivanov succeeded Nathan Rakhlin as Principal Conductor of the USSR State Symphony Orchestra. Under Ivanov's direction, the orchestra began an extensive program of touring. Initially this was to the republics of the Soviet Union, but in 1956 it performed in the Soviet allied states of Poland and Romania. As the Cold War thawed, Ivanov and the orchestra travelled outside the Communist bloc. In 1958 they made an appearance at an international exposition in Brussels where they performed for Queen Elizabeth of Belgium. In the same year they also visited China. In 1960, the orchestra visited the United States, then in 1961 appeared at the Vienna Festival.

Konstantin Ivanov was succeeded as Principal Conductor of the USSR Symphony Orchestra in 1965 by Yevgeny Svetlanov. His reputation in later years, at least in the west, was somewhat eclipsed by the rise of a younger generation of Soviet conductors such as Svetlanov, Rozhdestvensky and Kondrashin, all of whom became much better known, and who travelled abroad more frequently. He died on April 15, 1984, only 16 days shy of his 77th birthday.

== Recordings ==
Some of Ivanov's recordings became available in the west through the association of Britain's EMI Group with the Soviet state label Melodiya. These included his account of Glazunov’s 5th Symphony. The Dutch Melodia disc (562.265) of this performance was backed with four works by Anatoly Lyadov. EMI-Melodiya used these as fillers on LPs of Tchaikovsky’s First and Third Symphonies, conducted by Ivanov's successor Yevgeny Svetlanov. Ivanov also conducted Rimsky-Korsakov’s Antar Symphony with the USSR Radio and TV Symphony Orchestra on a 3-disc set of the composer's orchestral music. In 1973 Melodiya issued an LP of Rimsky-Korsakov's suites from Le Coq d'Or and Tsar Sultan. This also appeared on EMI-Melodiya. At various times, Ivanov recordings of Tchaikovsky's 5th Symphony have been in circulation, as have symphonies by Eshpai and Arensky, along with Shostakovich’s cantata The Sun Shines Over the Motherland.

The recordings considered here were heard in the following incarnations: Arensky: Suite No. 1 World Record Club (Australia) R 09475. Moscow Radio Symphony Orchestra (Coupled with Symphony No. 1 conducted by Eduard Serov) Glazunov: Symphony No 5 HMV-Melodiya LP ASD 2540 (Coupled with Rimsky-Korsakov, Symphony No 1 conducted by Boris Khaikin), Moscow Radio Symphony Orchestra. The Symphony was also released on Dutch Melodia LP 562.265 with Liadov's Kikimora, Baba Yaga and two orchestral polonaises. The Liadov items were played by the USSR Symphony Orchestra. Myaskovsky: Symphony No. 5 Melodiya Australia CD MA 3019 (no longer available). USSR Radio and TV Symphony Orchestra. Coupled with Symphony No. 11 (Moscow Symphony Orchestra conducted by Veronika Dudarova. Rimsky-Korsakov: Symphony No. 2 Antar, Moscow Radio Symphony Orchestra. World Record Club (Australia) 3-LP set R 06847–9. Suites from Le Coq D'or and Tsar Sultan have been issued by HMV-Melodiya, World Record Club (Australia), and on CD from Melodiya Australia MA 3027 (no longer available). Shostakovich: The Sun Shines Over The Motherland. RFSFR Russian Chorus (Director: Alexander Yurlov), USSR Symphony Orchestra. Russian Disc RDCD 11 048 (no longer available). Some of the LPs were issued by Capitol/Angel in the United States.
