= Felix Feodosidi =

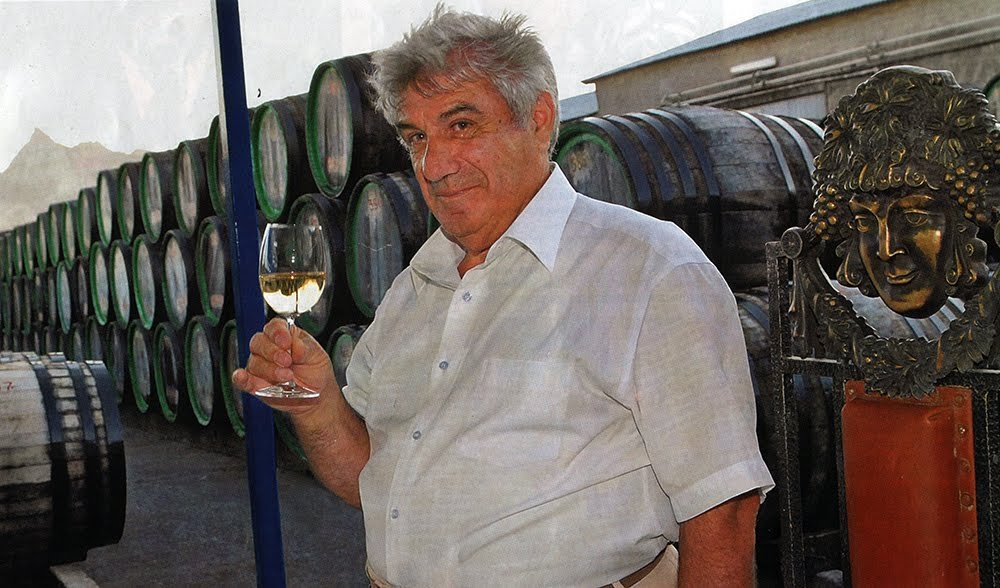
- Born: 31 July 1933; Kislovodsk, Russia
- Occupation: Winemaker

Felix Feodosidi (Greek: Φήλιξ Θεoδοσίδης; born July 31, 1933) is a Russian-Greek winemaker.

== Biography ==
Feodosidi was born in Kislovodsk on July 31, 1933, into a Pontic Greek family. His ancestors immigrated to Greece after escaping the Greek massacre in 1915–1916. His mother was Sophia Fedorovna Fulidi (1895–1964), and his father was Pericle Feliksovich Feodosidi (1891–1968), a native of Kars.

Feodosidi completed his high school education in Kislovodsk. After high school, he attended the Praskoveysky College of Viticulture and Winemaking, earning his degree in 1954. After graduating from college, he worked at the farm-factory Theodosia in Feodosia and the Suvorovsky-Beshtau winery in the Stavropol Kray. He worked as a winemaker and head of production.

Feodosidi has served as the major winemaking department chief at the farm-factory Koktebel since 1965. Feodosidi studied at the Crimean Agricultural Institute from 1970 to 1976. He liaised with the institute of viticulture and winemaking Magarach.

== Recognition and awards ==
- Medal "Veteran of Labor";
- Medal "For Valiant Labor. To commemorate the 100th anniversary of V. I. Lenin;
- Order of Merit »III degree;
- Medal to commemorate the 15th anniversary of Independence of Ukraine;
- Honored Worker of viticulture and winemaking of the Autonomous Republic of Crimea;
- Jury member of the International Union of tasting wine of the Autonomous Republic of Crimea.
