= Johannes Hint =

Estonian scientist

Johannes Rudolph Hint (20 September 1914 – 5 September 1985) was an Estonian scientist and the only person to create and successfully run a limited company under the communist planned economy of the Soviet Union. With his company, Dessim Ltd, he earned millions for the Soviet Union. His most important scientific invention was the building material silikaltsiit (Laprex), which was developed through the execution of the disintegrator system. His inventions are still widely used in Germany, Austria, the United States, Japan and Russia.

== Early life and education ==
Johannes Rudolph Hint was born in Kuusnõmme, a small fishing village in the west of Saaremaa island, Estonia, on 20 September 1914. His father, Alexander Hint, was a sailor and a member of the government in the Estonian Republic. His mother, Mare Hint, was a housewife.

In 1933, Hint graduated from Saaremaa Gymnasium with a concentration in science. From 1933 to 1934, he undertook an undergraduate degree in mathematics at Tartu Ülikool (Tartu University), and from 1935 to 1936, he continued his studies in the same technology department, majoring in building technology. In 1941, he graduated as a building engineer from Tallinn's Polytechnic Institute.

== Career ==
From 1961 to 1966, Hint was the head of operations of the Soviet Institute of Technological Research and projects of Silikatsiit (Silicalcite/Laprex) and between 1974 and 1981, the head of the construction and technological limited company Desintegraator (Disintegrator), which he established. Desintegraator (Disintegrator) joined forces with Austrian company Simmering-Graz-Pauker in 1977 and together they established an international company "Dessim", which was the first and possibly, the only successfully run business collaboration between the Soviet Union and the Western World.

== Scientific activity ==
Hint experimented with Rotary Impact Mill or Contra Rotating Mill – Disintegrator for decades. The Disintegrator processed the mixture by fine grinding and mechanical activation of material components with water, which further strengthened autoclave effects. Silicatsite (Laprex) factories were opened initially in Estonia but then all over the Soviet Union as well as in Japan and Italy. His company did not only concentrate on building materials but also manufactured and distributed universal disintegrator-activator and UDA technology.

From 1978 to 1981, the Disintegrator began trial production of biotechnological products. Especially, popular were food preparations that contained bio-active substances, which although sometimes regarded as "quack remedies" were distributed, not only across the Soviet Union, but also to the western world. The medical qualities and effects of two of the preparations, AU-8 (for internal use) and L-1 (for external application), were identified, after, Johannes Hint had been rehabilitated and production had been stopped. At a later date, these preparations were widely acknowledged as food preservatives, as journalist Siim Kallas confirmed in his 1988 article published in "Rahva Hääl", since similar biological samples, heralded the nutrition therapy boom in the west, a few years later.

== Political activity ==
Hint became a member of the Estonian Communist Party between 1941 and 1943. He was persuaded by his brother Aadu Hint, who later became a famous author in the Soviet Union. In 1943, he was arrested by the Nazis, who were occupying Estonia, as Hint was blacklisted as a communist. He was put to Nazi concentration camp in Estonia to await his execution. He managed to escape from the camp and flee to nearby Helsinki, Finland on a little fishing boat, crossing the Gulf of Finland in the middle of the night. His plan was to flee to nearby neutral Sweden, as Finland was allied with Nazi Germany, at the time. But, Hint failed, and was arrested in Helsinki, and placed in a war prisoners’ camp.

He was returned to his native Estonia after the end of Second World War. Estonia, then was occupied by the Soviet Union. By the end of the 1960s, Johannes had become deeply disappointed in the Soviet political system, and became what can be described as a "free mind", keeping a unique individualism and distance from the political and social ideologies of the communist regime. He was openly vocal to his friends and co-workers about his feelings against Soviet Rule. Johannes Hint, also had connections with members of the underground resistance, the Estonian Democratic Movement.

== Death ==
On 13 November 1981, Hint was arrested by the government officials under fabricated charges of embezzlement and forgery against him. The court case was finalized in December 1983. The result of the highly political court case found him guilty of abuse of office, and sentenced to prison for 15 years. Hint's national prizes, rewards and honors including scientific degrees and title were annulled, and all his possessions were confiscated, as the result of the court ruling. Hint was denied medical care during his incarceration, and he died at Patarei Prison Hospital on 5 September 1985 and was buried in Metsakalmistu, Tallinn. The Supreme Court of Soviet Union rehabilitated Johannes Hint entirely on 25 April 1989. Hint's titles of honors and scientific degrees were fully rehabilitated, and some of his confiscated possessions were returned posthumously.

On the occasion of the 100th anniversary of his birth, the Museum of Occupations in Tallinn opened a small exhibition of his belongings donated to the museum by his daughter.

== Awards ==
- 1949 ENSV (Estonian Socialist Republic of Soviet Union) National Prize
- 1964 ENSV Distinguished Service Medal for Science
- 1962 The Lenin Science Award

== Works ==
Over, 200 scientific publications, 62 inventions, and 28 patents are on his name.
