= Ella Ilbak =

Estonian dancer (1895–1997)

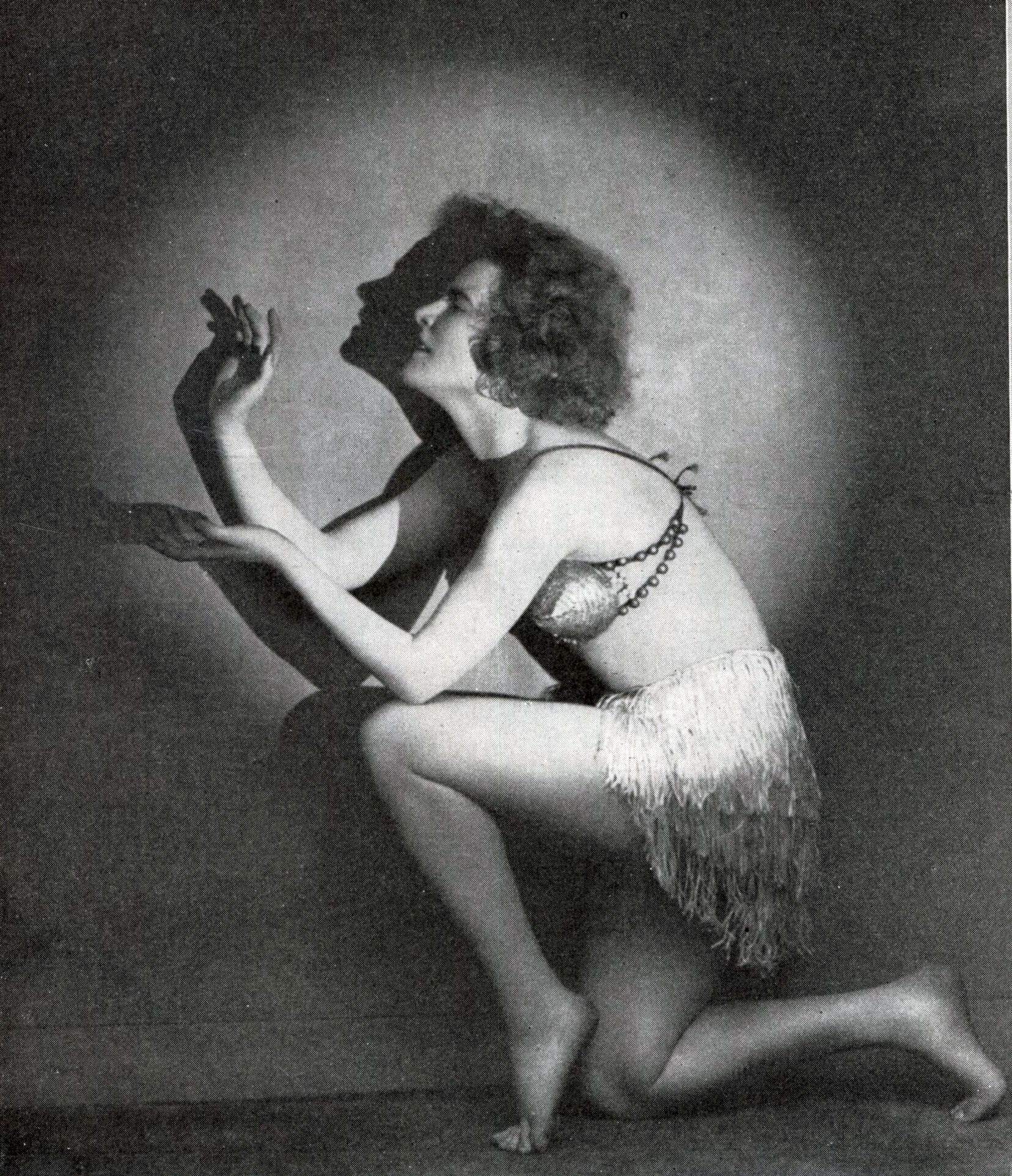
- Born: Ella Ilbak in 1938; November 12, 1895; Saksaveski farm, Karksi Parish, Governorate of Livonia, Russian Empire
- Died: August 8, 1997 (aged 101); Pontiac, Michigan, United States
- Occupations: Dancer, writer

Ella Ilbak (November 12 [O.S. October 31] 1895 – August 8, 1997) was an Estonian dancer and writer.

== Family ==
Ilbak was born at the Saksaveski farm in Karksi Parish in the Governorate of Livonia in the Russian Empire, the daughter of Juhan Ilbak (born 1857) and Tina Ilbak (born 1858) and the twin sister of Hilda Ilbak.

== Education ==
She attended primary schools in Tartu and Tartu Pushkin Girls' High School. From 1915 to 1917, she studied at Claudia Issatchenko's School of Plastic and Theater Arts in Petrograd, and in the eurhythmics courses of Serge Wolkonsky and Émile Jaques-Dalcroze.

== Career ==
In 1918 she performed at dance evenings in Estonia. From 1918 to 1919, she did further training in Paris at Maria Rutkowska's ballet studio, Raymond Duncan's academy, and Georges Hébert's acrobatic school.

Her best-known dance, Leek (The Flame), was set to the music of Richard Wagner's opera Die Walküre.

In the 1920s and 1930s, Ilbak performed extensively outside Estonia, primarily in Europe, but also in Jerusalem and Haifa. In the postwar years, she lived in France, and from there she moved to the United States in 1955, where she also pursued dance. She worked at a hospital for two years. Her last known performance was in 1967 in New York. Later she lectured at the Estonian House on the importance of beauty.

In addition, Ilbak published three autobiographical works in her later years: Otsekui hirv kisendab (1953) and a pair of novels, Tuvi Malm (1955) and Kumisev kannel (1966).

Ella Ilbak died at a nursing home in Pontiac, Michigan on August 8, 1997. In 1998, her ashes were laid to rest in Tallinn at Metsakalmistu (Forest Cemetery).

== Bibliography ==
- 1918: "Tants ja tantsjanna." In: Postimees (May 10, page 1)
- 1933: "Et, mis, kuidas..." In: Päewaleht (April 5, page 4)
- 1953: Otsekui hirv kisendab...: mälestusi ja tõekspidamisi (Lund: Eesti Kirjanike Kooperatiiv)
- 1955: Tuvi Malm: romaan (Lund: Eesti Kirjanike Kooperatiiv)
- 1966: Kumisev kannel: romaan (New York: Kultuur)
