= Lydia Auster =

Soviet and Estonian composer (1912–1993)

Lydia Martynovna Auster (Russian: Лидия Мартыновна Аустер, romanized: Lidiya Martynovna Auster; 30 May 1912 – 3 April 1993) was a Soviet and Estonian composer.

== Biography ==
She was born in Petropavlovsk, Akmolinsk Oblast, Russian Empire. After musical studies in Omsk in 1927–1931, she transferred to the Leningrad Conservatory, where she studied with Mikhail Youdin. She later continued studies at the Moscow Conservatory with Vissarion Shebalin. After her graduation in 1938, she continued post-graduate studies. These were interrupted in 1941, then resumed in 1944. During her period away from studies, she worked as a staff composer for the Ashgabat Philharmonic Orchestra in the Turkmen SSR.

After the end of the Great Patriotic War, Auster went to the Estonian SSR to study the local folk music. In 1948, Auster was appointed music director of the Estonian SSR Television and Radio Committee. Despite her position, she faced criticism for formalism by Soviet authorities. Nevertheless, she continued to serve in her position until 1984. She was also on the board of the Union of Composers of the Estonian SSR.

== Works list ==
Auster composed for ballet, orchestral works, music for the stage, chamber music, and songs, as well as an opera.

=== Ballets ===
According to Leonid Entelis, Auster's ballets, along with those of Eugen Kapp, were crucial in the development of ballet in Estonia.

- Tiina, Op. 20 (1955)
- Northern Dream, op. 22 (1960)
- Romeo, Juliet and Darkness (1969)
- Bamby (1986)

=== Works for symphony orchestra ===
- Sinfonietta in D Major (1939)
- Estonia (1945)
- Suite of Estonian Folk Tunes (Estonian suite) (1948)
- Honour to Soviet Estonia (1950)
- Melody (1973)
- Suite from ballet "Tiina" (1974)
- Fragments from ballet "Romeo, Juliet and Darkness" (1975)
- Festive Prologue (1976)
- Suite from ballet "Northern Dream" (1980)
- Gather the Hay, op. 40 (1984)
- Estonian Capriccio, Op. 16
- Flat-Footed Waltz

=== Opera ===
- May Morning (1970)

=== Musical and/or drama and/or dance works for stage ===
- Dance of Girlfriends (1961)
- Mushrooms (1961)
- Nightly Threshing (1967)

=== Works for string orchestra ===
- Two Pieces in the Memory of Alexandras Livontas, op. 31 (1974)
- Melody, Op. 30 (1973)

=== Works for solo instruments and orchestra ===
- Piano concerto in G Major, op. 18 (1952)
- Lyrical Concertino "Summer in Käsmu", op. 25 (1972)
- Ball Game, op. 42 (1986)
- Children's Games, Op. 43 (1988)

=== Works for ensemble ===
- String Quartet No 1 in A minor (1937)
- String Quartet No. 2, in G major (1939)
- String Quartet No. 3 in F minor (1945/1979)
- Suite on Estonian Folk Tunes (1946)
- Suite No. 1, Op. 16 (1947)
- Summer in Käsmu, op. 25 (1972)
- Ballade Sonata (1982)
- Four Pieces for Wind Quintet, op. 38 (1983)
- Amusing Walk (1987)
- Sonata for Clarinet and Piano (1988)
- Romance (1991)

=== Works for solo instrument ===
- Vernal Preludes and Fugues (1952)
- Eight Moods, Op. 36 (1978-1979)
- Reflections I, Op. 44 (1988-1989)

=== Vocal works ===
- Seasons (1936)
- Seven Romances, Op. 14 (1938-1945)
- A Song for Soviet Estonia (1946)
- Lullaby (1946)
- Not Allowed to Go Home (1946)
- Ski-ride (1946)
- Song of Mothers (1946)
- Traveling Proudly (1946)
- 24th of November (1946)
- May Came (1947)
- May Winner (1947)
- Work Heroes (1948)
- Romances on lyrics by Lydia Koidula (1949/1957)
- Two Brothers (1951)
- In the Evening (1952)
- Four Songs (1958)
- Leaving Song (1959)
- There, Where the Rivers Are Flowing (1966)
- Song about Irkutsk (1966)
- My Comrade’s Word (1967)
- A Child Is Drawing Peace (1967)
- The Year 1941 (1967)
- Morning of Peace, Op 32 (1975)
- Fisherman's Dream (1977)
- Iron Will (1977)
- Our Boys (1983)
- Eternal Flame, op. 40 (1984)

=== Incidental music ===
- Music for G. Vladytchin’s and O. Netchayev’s play "Marvelous Vassilissa" (1947)
- Music for Alexei Simukov’s play "Magic Grain" (1947)
- Music for N. Gernet’s play "Aladdin and the Wonderful Lamp" (1948)
- Music for Tamara Kovalevskaja’s play "Forest Fairy Tale" (1950)

== Legacy ==
Conductors who have championed her work include Neeme Järvi, Eri Klas, Roman Matsov, Rostislav Merkulov, Kirill Raudsepp, Alexander Ryabov.

Auster was awarded Honored Artist of the Estonian SSR and People's Artist of the Estonian SSR in 1957 and 1984 respectively.
