= Helmi Puur =

Estonian ballet dancer and ballet master

- 1954 Swan Lake debut, photo from the Estonian National Archives, with Artur Koit
- Born: 20 December 1933; Tallinn, Estonia
- Died: 6 July 2014 (aged 80); Tallinn, Estonia
- Other names: Helmi Kiik
- Occupation: ballerina
- Years active: 1953-2010

Helmi Puur (20 December 1933 – 6 July 2014) was an Estonian prima ballerina, dance master and coach. One of the first ballerinas to study in the Tallinn Ballet School, she helped establish the art of ballet in the country. She was honored with numerous awards throughout her career and is remembered for establishing the careers of many Estonian ballet dancers.

== Early life ==
Helmi Puur was born on 20 December 1933 in Tallinn, Estonia. Her father was a factory worker and the family of three children lived in difficult circumstances, in a basement apartment on Koplis street. She enrolled in the children's ballet studio at the Estonia Theatre in 1944 and then in 1946 when the Tallinn Ballet School was founded, became one of the first class of students. She completed her training with two years of study under the tutelage of Elena Shiripina (ru) at the Vaganova Academy of Russian Ballet, graduating in 1953.

== Career ==
Arriving back in Estonia, Puur debuted with Vladimir Bourmeister's staging of Swan Lake and gained acclaim with people coming from all over the country to see the event. She began working as the soloist at the Estonia Theatre and for two years was the principal dancer until a bout of tuberculosis forced her to withdraw. In 1957, she was awarded the title Honored Artist of the Estonian Soviet Socialist Republic and the following year returned as the principal of the Estonian Theater. In 1960, illness again drove her from the stage and Puur spent four years recovering from tuberculosis to return as the prima ballerina once again from 1964 to 1966. Her 1965 performance of Juliet in Romeo and Juliet moved the audience to a standing ovation and the orchestra to stop playing when Puur appeared on the stage.

In 1966, Puur retired from dancing, after a serious back injury, and became a dance master, teaching students like Kaie Kõrb, who studied with Puur in 1980. In 1968, she married the writer Heino Kiik. In 1976, she was awarded the title of People's Artist of the Estonian SSR; in 1993 she received the Special Prize of the Estonian Theater Workers' Union; in 1999 she was recognized for her lifetime achievements in the field of dance with the Philip Morris Award; and in 2001 was granted the Order of the White Star, third class.

Puur's most noted roles were as Odette-Odile in Swan Lake in her 1953 debut, as the flower waltz soloist in Tchaikovsky's The Nutcracker(1953) and as Beatrice in Mikhail Chulaki's Imaginary fiance (1954). Noted roles included Esmeralda in the opera of the same name, the title role in the ballet Giselle, Sylphide in Chopiniana, Maria in The Fountain of Bakhchisarai, as well as others. She was known for her lyricism, poetic rhythm and romantic presentation and noted for her role to establish ballet as an art form in Estonia.

In 2010, she was one of the featured artists in a play, Luikede järve, staged by choreographer Dmitri Hartsenko. The production featured Puur and Kaie Kõrb, both dancers of previous eras with young dancers just beginning their careers. Though she was aging, Puur insisted on trying out for the part and worked hard in rehearsals for the performance. The memorable performance was well received.

== Death and legacy ==
Puur died on 6 July 2014 and was buried in Forest Cemetery on 12 July 2014 after services held at the St. John's Church in Tallinn.

== Citations and references ==
=== Cited sources ===
- Allkivi, Kais (12 July 2014). "'Kes on korra luike tantsinud, jääb igavesti luigeks.'" [Who has once danced with swans, will forever remain a swan.]. Õhtuleht (in Estonian). Tallinn, Estonia. Archived from the original on 26 July 2014.
- Kaukvere, Tiina (7 July 2014). "Lahkus priimabaleriin Helmi Puur" [Prima ballerina Helmi Puur has passed]. Postimees (in Estonian). Tallinn, Estonia. Archived from the original on 2 April 2017.
- Григорович (Grigorovich), Юрий Николаевич (Yuri Nikolaevich), ed. (1981). "Пуур Хельми Александровна (Puur, Helmi Aleksandrovna)". Балет. Энциклопедия (Ballet. Encyclopedia) (in Russian). Moscow, Russia: Советская энциклопедия. OCLC 652294328. Archived from the original on 5 March 2016 – via ballet-enc.ru.
- Pedusaar, Heino (December 2013). "Legend Helmi Puur 80". Teater.Muusika.Kino (Theater, Music, Cinema) (in Estonian). Tallinn, Estonia: Perioodika. Archived from the original on 2 April 2017.
- Просянов (Prosyanov), Жан (Jean), ed. (7 July 2014). "Хельми Пуур" [Helmi Puur]. Kino-teatr.ru (in Russian). Moscow, Russia. Archived from the original on 2 September 2016.
- Vasli, Karoliina (8 July 2014). "Kaie Kõrb: Helmi Puur suutis tantsijatele hinge sisse puhuda" [Kaie Kõrb: Helmi Puur was able to catch the soul of the dancers]. Õhtuleht (in Estonian). Tallinn, Estonia. Archived from the original on 25 November 2015.
- "Galerii: Helmi Puur saadeti viimsele teele" [Gallery: Helmi Puur Takes her Last Journey]. Õhtuleht (in Estonian). Tallinn, Estonia. 13 July 2014. Archived from the original on 23 January 2016.
- "Suri baleriin Helmi Puur" [Died ballerina Helmi Puur]. Õhtuleht (in Estonian). Tallinn, Estonia. 7 July 2014. Archived from the original on 23 January 2016.
