= Boris Parsadanian =

Soviet and Estonian composer (1925–1997)

Boris Khristoforovich Parsadanian
- Борис Христофорович Парсаданян
- Born: May 14, 1925; Kislovodsk, Russian SFSR, USSR
- Died: May 14, 1997 (aged 72); Tallinn, Estonia
- Resting place: Metsakalmistu
- Other name: Boris Parsadanov

Boris Khristoforovich Parsadanian (Russian: Бори́с Христофо́рович Парсаданя́н, Armenian: Բորիս Փարսադանյան; May 14, 1925 – May 14, 1997) was a Soviet Armenian and Estonian composer, violinist, and arts administrator.

== Biography ==
Parsadanian was born in Kislovodsk, Russian SFSR, in 1925. He began his musical studies in Ashgabat, Turkmen SSR, studying violin with Anton Gerbler. Later he moved to Moscow and enrolled at the Armenian House of Culture, where he studied with Genrikh Litinsky. His studies were interrupted by his military service in World War II, during which he was decorated.

After the war Parsadanian enrolled in the Gnessin Institute where he studied composition and violin. He resumed studies with Litinsky and also began studying orchestration with Nikolai Timofeyev. He was well liked by his classmates for his playing and personality, but school staff initially disapproved of his behavior, particularly his constant playing of excerpts from Aram Khachaturian's Violin Concerto. Parsadanian graduated in 1950.

His first work to earn success was his Piano Trio, which was premiered at a student concert; the piano part was played by fellow student Yevgeny Svetlanov. This was followed by his tone poem David of Sassoun, which was based on the eponymous hero from the Armenian national epic, Daredevils of Sassoun. Parsadanian later became influenced by Dmitri Shostakovich, who encouraged the younger composer's efforts.

In 1953 Parsadanian married Virve Kiple and moved to the Estonian SSR, where she was born. Parsadanian enrolled at the Tallinn Conservatory, where he studied with Heino Eller. During this period Parsadanian played in the violin section of the Estonian SSR State Symphony Orchestra and joined the Estonian SSR Composers' Union. He graduated from the Tallinn Conservatory in 1959.

Parsadanian returned to Moscow, where he was appointed concertmaster of the Moscow State Symphony Orchestra. He also began to establish himself as a composer. His music was championed by Svetlanov, Alexander Gauk, Tatiana Grindenko, Roman Matsov, Neeme Järvi, Eri Klas, Peeter Lilje, and the Borodin Quartet. According to Svetlanov, Parsadanian's music was the closest any modern Armenian composer had yet come to approaching Komitas. From 1968 to 1970, Parsadanian worked with music programs at CT USSR.

In 1970 Parsadanian returned to Estonia permanently. There he served as director of the Estonian SSR State Philharmonic. He was awarded Honored Worker of the Arts of the Estonian SSR and People's Artist of the Estonian SSR in 1967 and 1988 respectively.

His compositions include eleven symphonies composed between 1958 and 1987. The Symphony No. 2 was dedicated to Martiros Saryan, who had sketched a portrait of the composer. Parsadanian also composed a violin concerto (1955), wind quintet (1967), string quartet (1974), violin sonata (1986), and other music.

Shostakovich gave the manuscript of his Intervision to Parsadanian; it was later acquired by the Juilliard Manuscript Collection.
