= Aarne Viisimaa =

Estonian opera singer

Aarne Viisimaa (born as Arnold Peeter Visman; 25 November 1898, Sangaste – 2 October 1989, Stockholm) was an Estonian operatic tenor and opera director. He was notably the director of the Estonian National Opera from 1927 to 1944. As an opera singer, he performed such roles as Eisenstein in Die Fledermaus, Lenski in Eugene Onegin, Ottavio in Don Giovanni, Pinkerton in Madama Butterfly, Tamino in The Magic Flute, and the title roles in Faust and Lohengrin among others. He is buried in the Metsakalmistu cemetery in Tallinn, Estonia.

Viisimaa was a member of the Ugala Fraternity.

His son Vello Viisimaa was an actor and also an opera singer.

== Sources ==
- Pŏldmäe, Mare. Aarne Viisimaa, Eesti Teatriliit 2000, ISBN 9985-860-13-6
