= All-Union Conductors Competition =

Soviet conducting competition

The All-Union Conductors Competition was a competition among musical conductors in the Soviet Union from 1938 to 1988. It took place in Moscow for its first time in 1938 when a set of prizes was awarded by a jury chaired by Samuil Samosud and including Nikolai Myaskovsky, Heinrich Neuhaus, Aleksandr Goldenweiser, Aleksandr Gauk, Dmitri Kabalevsky amongst other relevant musicians. From 1966 to 1988, the competition took place regularly averaging about one event per five years.

== Awarded list ==
=== 1938: I edition ===
- Yevgeny Mravinsky (first prize)
- Natan Rakhlin (second prize)
- Alexander Melik-Pashayev (second prize)
- Konstantin Ivanov (third prize)
- Marcos Paverman (fourth prize)
- Kiril Kondrashin (diploma)

=== 1966: II edition ===
- Yuri Temirkanov (first prize)
- Aleksandr Dmitriyev
- Fuat Mansurov
- Yuri Simonov
- Daniel Tyulin
- Maxim Shostakovich

=== 1971: III edition ===
- Alexander Lazarev
- Waldemar Nelson

=== 1976: IV edition ===
- Valery Gergiev

=== 1983: V edition ===
- Gintaras Rinkevičius

=== 1988: VI edition ===
- Alexander Polianichko (first prize)
- Alexander Polishchuk (third prize)
- Rashid Skuratov (third prize)
