= Vello Viisimaa =

Estonian actor and singer

- Born: Vello Visman; 1 January 1928; Tallinn, Estonia
- Died: 14 February 1991 (aged 63); Tallinn, then part of Estonian SSR, Soviet Union
- Occupations: Opera singer, actor
- Years active: 1944–1991
- Spouses: Laine Tarmo; Teesi Mõtus

Vello Viisimaa (1 January 1928 – 14 February 1991) was an Estonian opera singer and stage actor who appeared mostly in operettas.

== Biography ==
=== Career ===
Vello Viisimaa was born in Tallinn, Estonia, the son of opera singer Aarne Viisimaa and Hilda Marie Viisimaa (née Hansen). He had one older brother, Uno Viisimaa. From 1944 to 1980 he worked at the Estonia Theatre, from 1944 to 1949, he was a theater actor and stage manager, and from 1950 to 1980 he was a soloist. He also performed with the Estonian Philharmonic Chamber Choir.

In addition to his stage roles, Viisimaa appeared in several popular Estonian television comedy films directed by Sulev Nõmmik, such as Mehed ei nuta (1968) and Noor pensionär (1972).

=== Personal life ===
Vello Viisimaa was first married to Laine Viisimaa (née Tarmo). They had one daughter, Maris Kõrgema Viisimaa, before divorcing. He then married ballerina Teesi Viisimaa (née Mõtus) and the couple had one daughter, Piret Viisimaa. During his later years, he would tutor drama students in Pajusi, where he had a summer home. He died in 1991, aged 63, in Tallinn, and was buried at the city's Metsakalmistu cemetery.

=== Legacy ===
Following his death in 1991, Viisimaa was posthumously awarded the Meie Mats Memorial Award. In 2002, the Pajusi Community Center was opened in Jõgeva County with a marble memorial plaque of Vello Viisimaa. In 2011, his widow, Teesi Viisimaa, released the biography Vello Viisimaa: Lauldes Vihmas, published by Tänapäev.
