= Riidaja =

Village in Estonia

- village
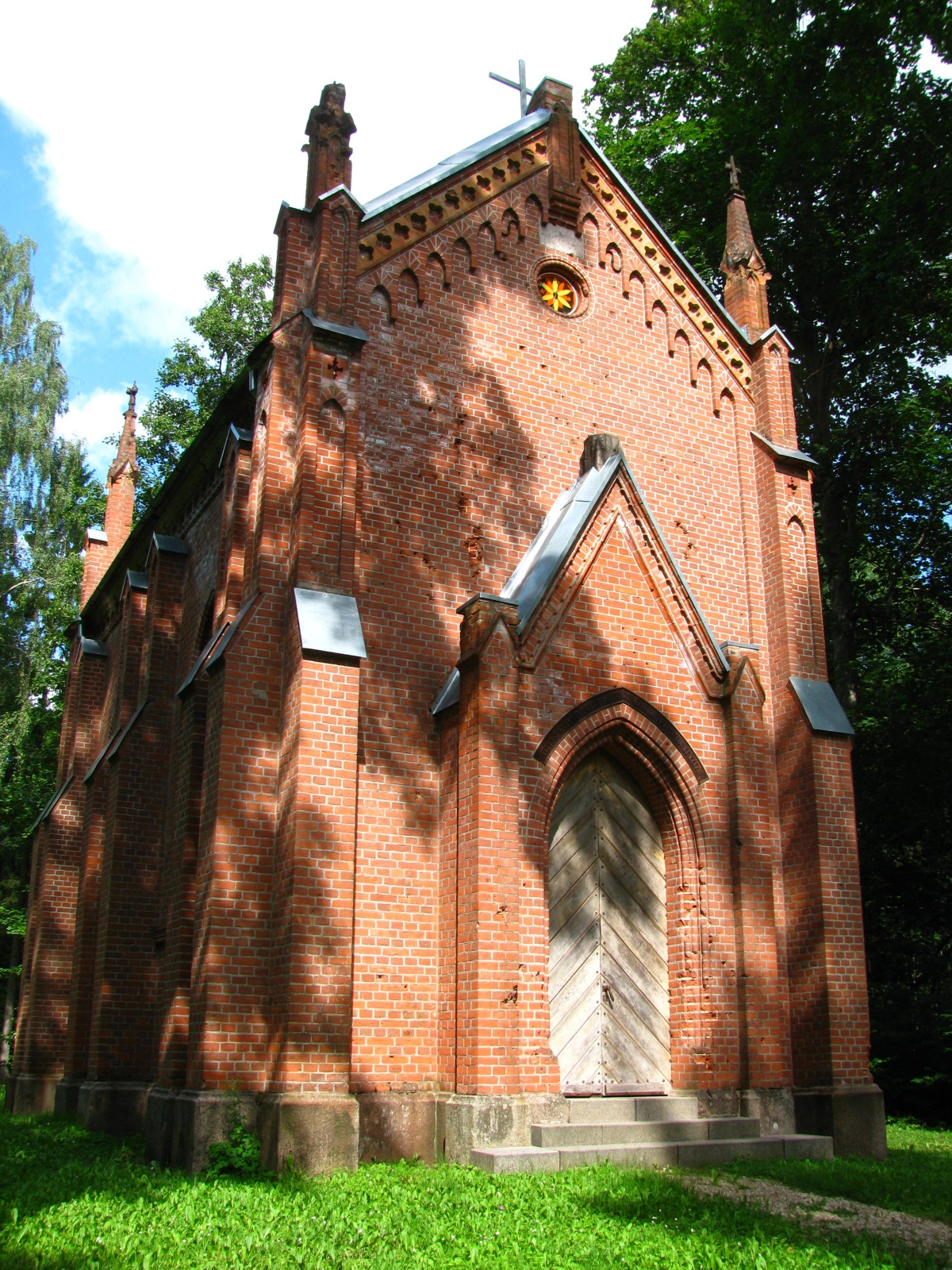
- Riidaja manor cemetery chapel

- Location in Estonia
- Coordinates: 58°05′44″N 25°53′45″E
- Country: Estonia
- County: Valga County
- Municipality: Tõrva Parish

Population (01.01.2012)
  - Total: 233

Riidaja is a village in Tõrva Parish, Valga County, in southern Estonia. It has a population of 233 (as of 1 January 2012).

== Parks ==
Riidaja Park is located in the village, and exemplified Riidaja manor. One of the most abundant type of neighborhood parks. Under the protection of individual is Riidaja oak. The original park was a regular, high-baroque flower garden behind the main building, founded on 18th II half-century after the completion of the main building of the 1762nd year. Park was reconstructed free-shaped on 19th mid-century. A large 11.8-hectare park is generally a free-shaped. The mansion's front square is a big, elongated, asymmetrical green lawn, surrounded by the entry road. Survived the challenge, some surrounded by stone columns. Roundabout allele escaped through the gate of the building. Riidaja Manor is a big part of surroundings mansion surrounded by a stone fence. Gate construction is easy, two postal stone tapered tip. Front square is closed in the northwest, southeast and south fronts of buildings and the stone wall, the rest of the free form of disability groups. Back Square, the former baroque flower garden, stone wall is limited. Has been maintained ever since the old tree of life, which under the mossy Millstones. The square is violated with occasional planting, especially by the school to have many trees and ornamental shrubs. Behind the main building is a terrace with a front two of the tree of life. Departing from the rear, remains of stone walls in the former fruit and berry garden. The park's main building is a major part of the immediate vicinity of the open, and it is located on a slope. The mansion has a large horseshoe-shaped groundwater-fed pond, which is left completely open. The park is the furthest part of the dense forest of appearance. This part of the park is bisected by the oblong, deep-loop. The furthest part of the park transitions to park-forest. The south part of the park has been semi-opened park landscape, which ranged from the eastern border of the larger shape of the free groundwater nutritional to the pond. Oaks line the park is limited to core-northwest. Park also includes the buildings at the onset of economic fields over the park in an alley of oak forest rang.

== See also ==
- Riidaja Airfield
