= Roman Matsov =

Soviet and Estonian conductor (1917–2001)

Roman Voldemarovich Matsov
- Birth name: Roman Voldemarovich Matsov
- Born: 27 April 1917; Petrograd, Russian SFSR, Soviet Union
- Died: 24 August 2001 (aged 84); Tallinn, Estonia
- Genres: Classical
- Occupation: Conductor
- Instruments: Violin, piano
- Years active: 1940s–2001

Roman Voldemarovich Matsov (Russian: Роман Вольдемарович Матсов; 27 April 1917, Petrograd – 24 August 2001, Tallinn) was a Soviet and Estonian violinist, pianist, and conductor.

He undertook summer courses in Berlin under Georg Kulenkampff (violin) and Walter Gieseking (piano). In 1940 he graduated from the Tallinn Conservatory in violin and piano, and shortly before Estonia became part of the USSR he entered the Leningrad Conservatory, while still being Konzertmeister of several Estonian symphony orchestras.

At the outbreak of war he volunteered for the front and became a lieutenant, but being wounded severely in 1941. In 1943 he conducted for the first time, in Yaroslav, with the evacuated Estonian artistic collective. He received his first conducting prize in 1946. Matsov received the All-Union Conductors Competition's prize in 1948. By 1950 he was a regular conductor and lead conductor of Estonia Radio and TV Symphony Orchestra. He gave premiers of many works of Estonian composers, along with Stravinsky, Hindemith, Schoenberg and Webern, and went on to rise rapidly.

During the Second World War his family emigrated to Australia and his sister in Australia found out that he was still alive only by seeing news of a concert.

However, later he was criticised for scheduling the works of Mahler.

== Friendship with Shostakovich ==
Roman Matsov collaborated with Dmitri Shostakovich to ensure the composer's music survived, but like Maria Yudina was banned from traveling abroad and spurned by official musical authorities. Three years following his death, in 2004 Gramophone noted "A home is being sought for thousands of Shostakovich manuscripts and recordings still stored in the Estonian apartment of the collection's former owner, conductor Roman Matsov".

== Recordings ==
- LP Estonian Radio Symphony Orchestra under Roman Matsov

== Awards ==
- Order of the Red Star (1945)
- Honored Artist of the Estonian SSR (1954)
- Order of the Red Banner of Labour (1956)
- People's Artist of the Estonian SSR (1967)
- Order of the Patriotic War, 2nd class (1985)
- Order of the White Star, 3rd class (2001)
