= E11 European long distance path =

Walking path in Europe

E11
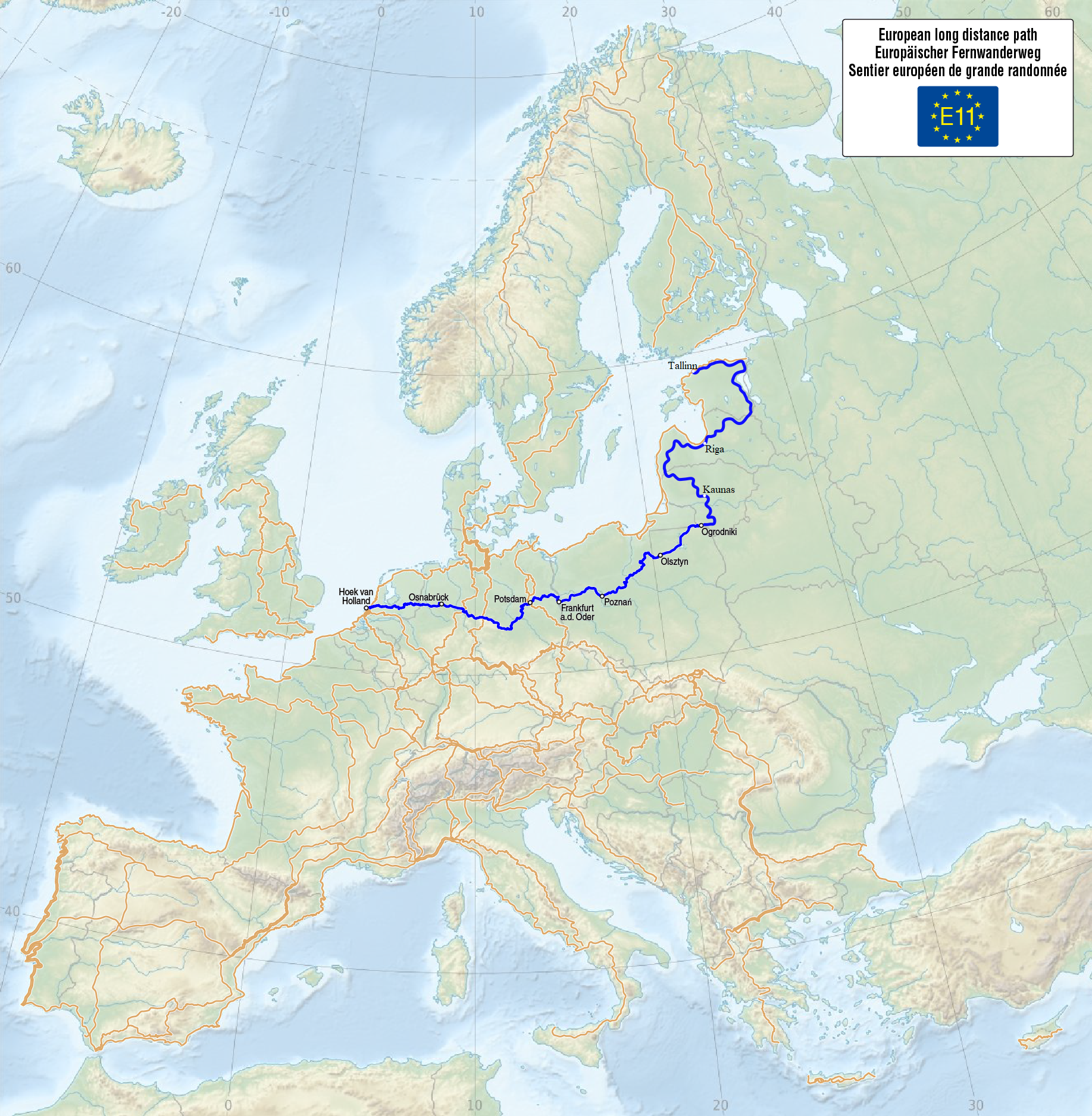
- Map of E11
- Length: 4700 km
- Location: Europe: Netherlands, Germany, Poland, Lithuania, Latvia, Estonia
- Designation: European long-distance path
- Trailheads: Scheveningen in The Hague; Tallinn in Estonia
- Use: Hiking; large parts can be done on bicycle and horseback
- Highest point: Harz mountains, 514 m (1,686 ft)
- Lowest point: Rijnsaterwoude, −5 m (−16 ft)
- Difficulty: Easy with some long stretches
- Season: All year
- Sights: forests and wooded land, rivers and lakes, cities
- Hazards: Tick-borne diseases Boars; Rabies infected animals Stinging wasps Wolves; Limited food Poisonous plants Vipers

The E11 European long distance path or E11 path is one of the European long-distance paths, running 4700 km (about 2900 miles) west-east from The Hague in the Netherlands through Germany, Poland, Lithuania, Latvia to Tallinn, Estonia. It starts in Scheveningen, a fishing community, commercial harbor and spa in The Hague on the Dutch coast of the North Sea. It ends in Tallinn, a medieval Hanseatic town situated side by side with the 21st century city of modern glass buildings, located on the shore of the Gulf of Finland of the Baltic Sea.

The E11 is one of three European long distance paths running East from the Benelux to the Baltic states. In the North, following the German, Polish, Lithuanian, Latvian and Estonian coasts of North Sea and Baltic Sea, the E9 offers a variety of polders, sandy and rocky beaches, dunes, coastal meadows and commercial harbors. In Estonia the route goes along the very seashore for around 100 km, mainly between Haapsalu and Tallinn. But in other places crossing the coastline becomes difficult as it is shaped by numerous capes, peninsulas, wetlands with reeds, floodplains, lagoons and shallow coves, which is why the remaining distance of around 500 km has to be covered via seaside trails, roads and along motor roads. More to the South, the E3 crosses through the long range of medium-sized mountains that links the mainly Belgian Ardennes to the Carpathian Mountains. The E11 takes an intermediate course through the rolling lowlands of Northern Germany and Poland, then goes through the Baltic states. Nowhere on the way to Estonia does it touch a sea (not even the North Sea, as E11 starts in Scheveningen behind the first rows of buildings), but it passes a single medium-sized mountain range, the Harz Mountains in the center of Germany. But in Estonia on the northern shores of Lake Peipus and in some places along the Gulf of Finland it runs along sandy beaches or stony, rocky and sometimes overgrown shores. European long distance footpaths are strictly developed as hiking trails, but almost all of E11 can be travelled on a saddle - be it on a horse or a bicycle.

== Geology and biology ==
Most of the (original, pre-human) landscape along E11 was formed in the last 14,000 years, i.e. in the current Holocene or warmer period since the last ice age. The melting ice in Northern Europe caused huge rivers to carve out wide valleys, whilst the sea level rose significantly and flooded low land. It is known that the river Thames in England was once a tributary of the river Rhine on the continent; Britain was then not separated from the continent by the North Sea. In what is now known as the Netherlands and in the plains of (now) Northern Germany and Poland, rivers began to flow to carry the melted ice towards what became the Baltic Sea (itself also a result of the rising sea level) or the North Sea. These areas are now characterized by low-lying land, marshes, sandy old dunes (now stationary hills) alternating with older layers of peat.

From the Dutch and German border to the Harz, however, E11 passes through a different and much older geological area. It consists of a range of low mountain ridges (such as the Wiehen Hills and the Wesergebirge), created almost 100 million years ago from marine sediments which started to rise. The Harz mountains themselves are even much older (about 300 million years according to academic estimates) and stem from a variety of complicated geological processes. After the Harz, E11 drops back to the estuaries of the rivers in the plains.

Large parts of the E11 cross through forests, for which sometimes considerable detours are made. Open scenery is found in small parts of The Netherlands as well as in Eastern Germany and around the Polish city of Poznań. Nevertheless, the E11 links some interesting cities, such as The Hague, Amersfoort, Deventer, Osnabrück, Goslar, Luther's Wittenberg, Berlin, Frankfurt (Oder), Poznań, Gniezno, Toruń, Olsztyn, Lidzbark Warmiński and Kętrzyn. Lakes and rivers are not uncommon along the trail. The trail can be walked at any time of year, but the Polish winter is long, with a lot of snow. The highest point of E11 is 514 meters on the slopes of the Harz Mountains, whereas the lowest point is slightly under sea level in one of the polders in the West of The Netherlands.

Apart from getting lost in the vast Polish forests, there seem to be few hazards other than the occasional wild boar or gray wolf, or even a rare Eurasian lynx. It is only at the end of a severe winter season, when the animals are hungry, that extra care must be taken. In the summer, one might tread on a venomous adder and in any season one might be bitten by a rabies infected mammal. The one really big danger, however, is the almost invisible tick as it may be infected with tick-borne diseases, especially Lyme disease and tick-borne meningoencephalitis.

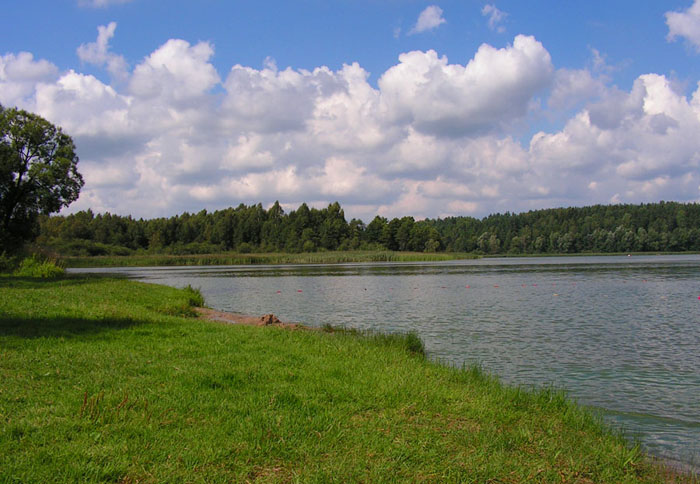
Lakes and rivers characterize the lower areas along E11

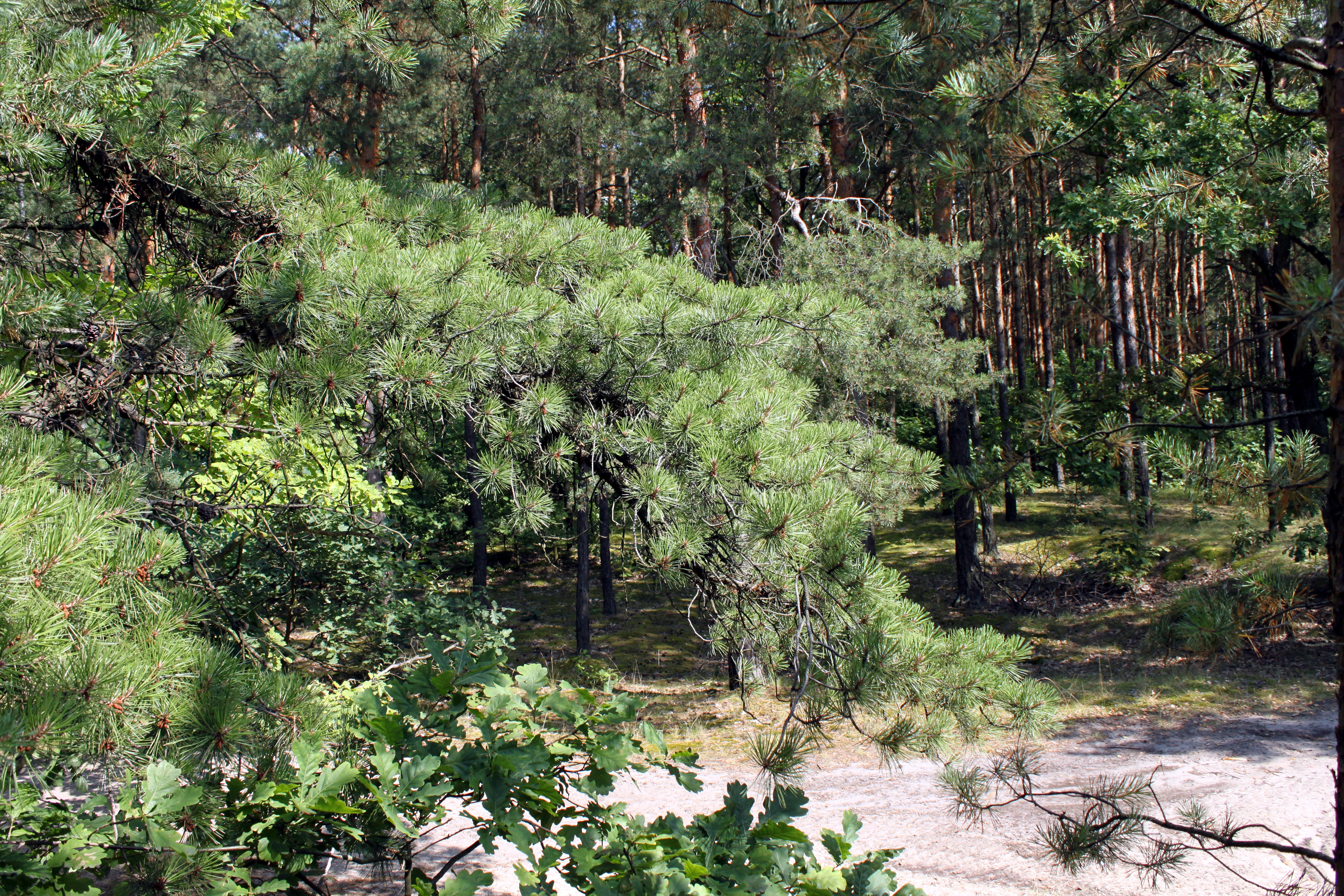
Pine forest is typical for the whole area

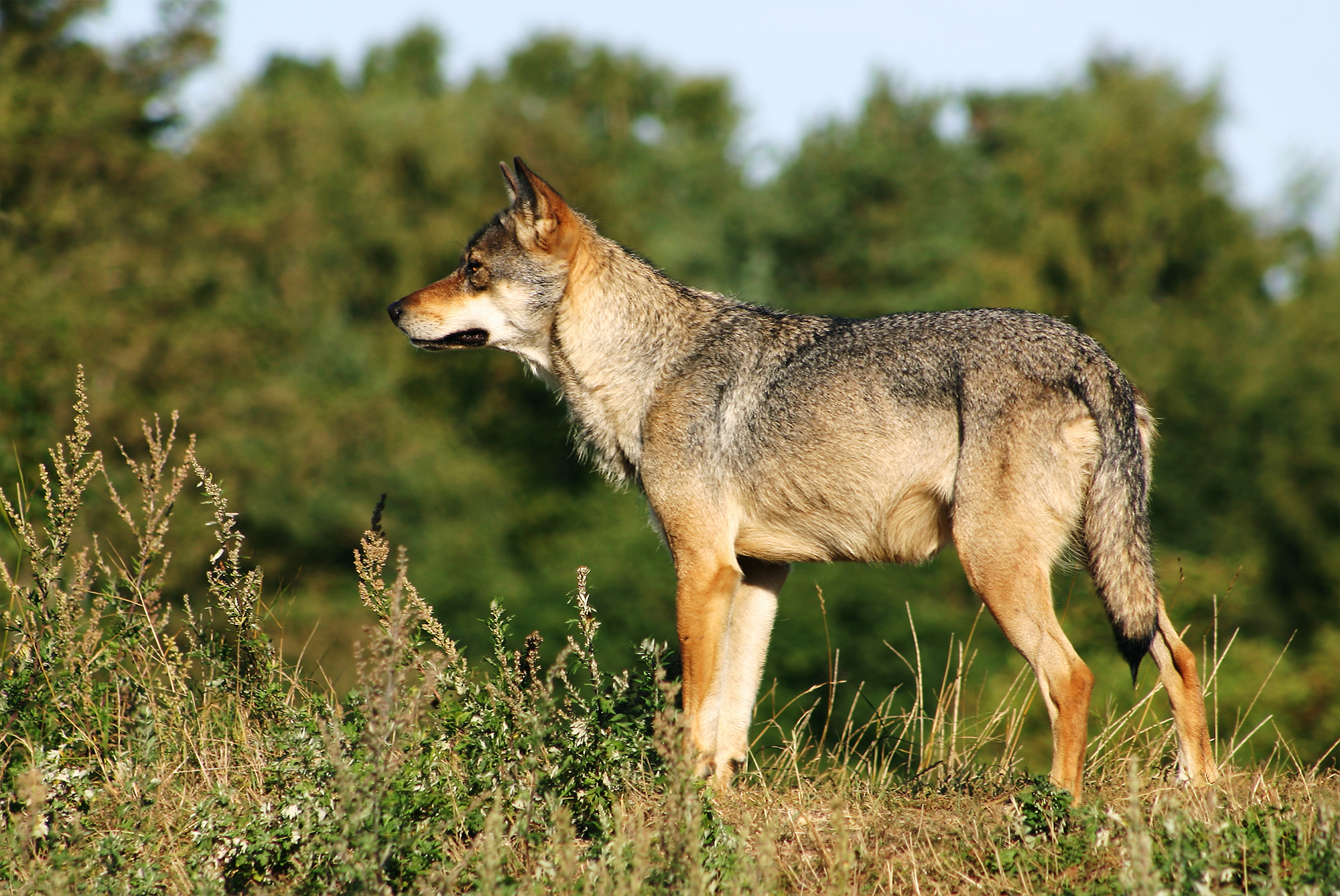
Wolves are scarce and shy

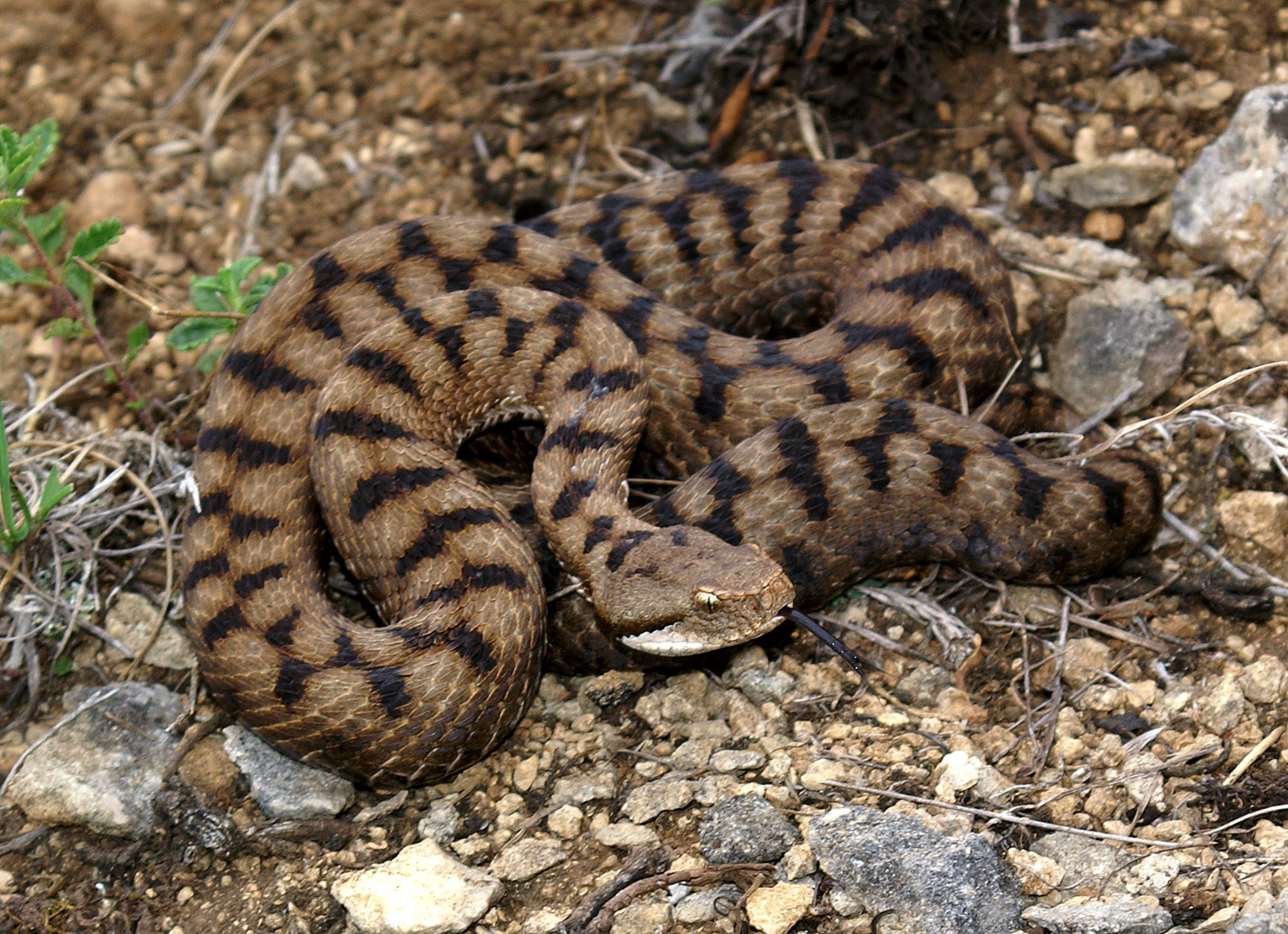
Adders are rare and easily overlooked

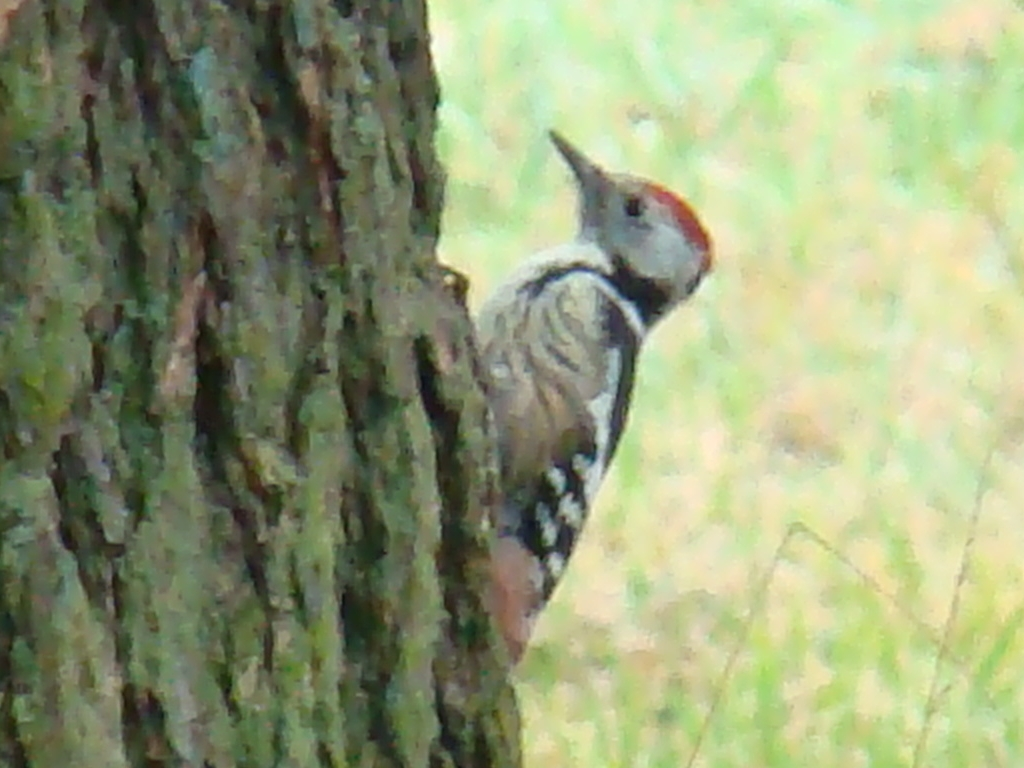
The woodpecker is heard in every forest

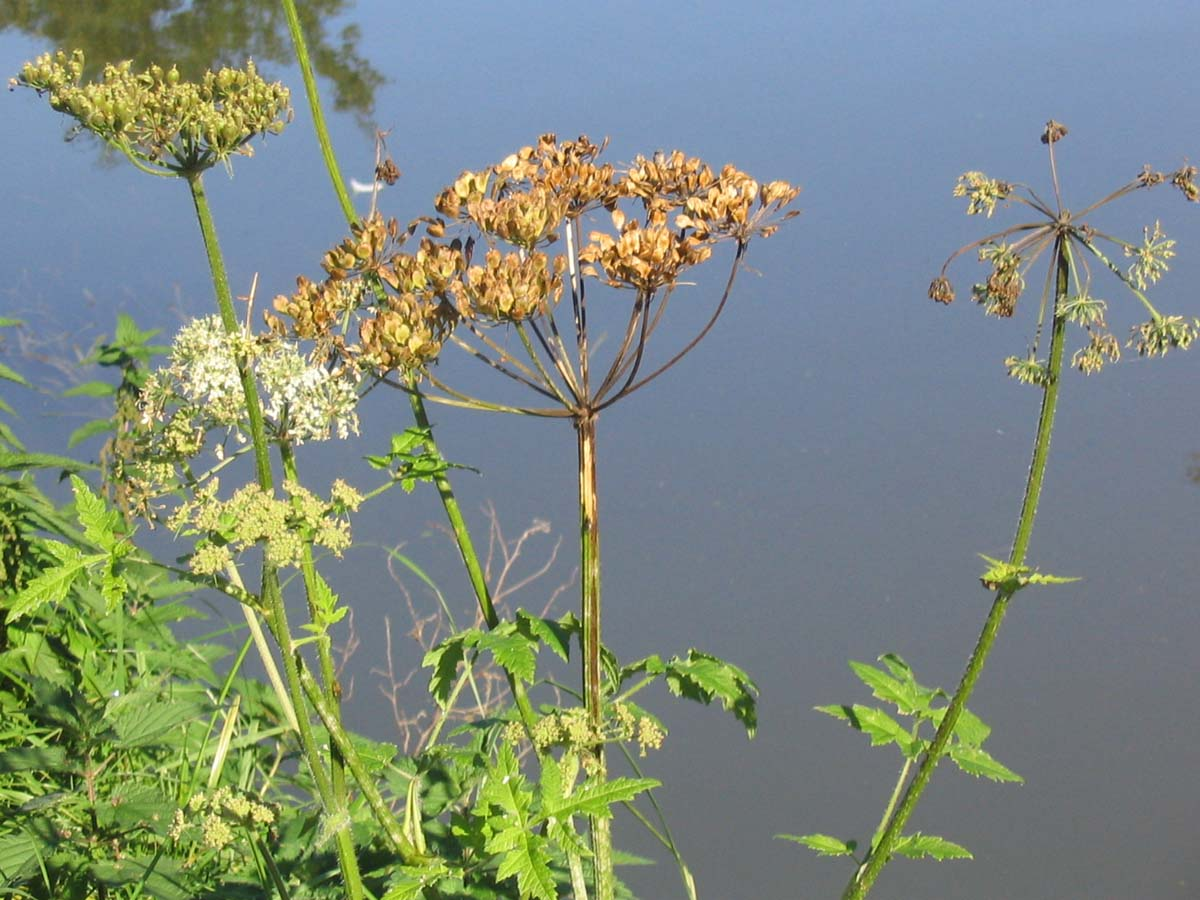
The giant hogweed causes a burning pain

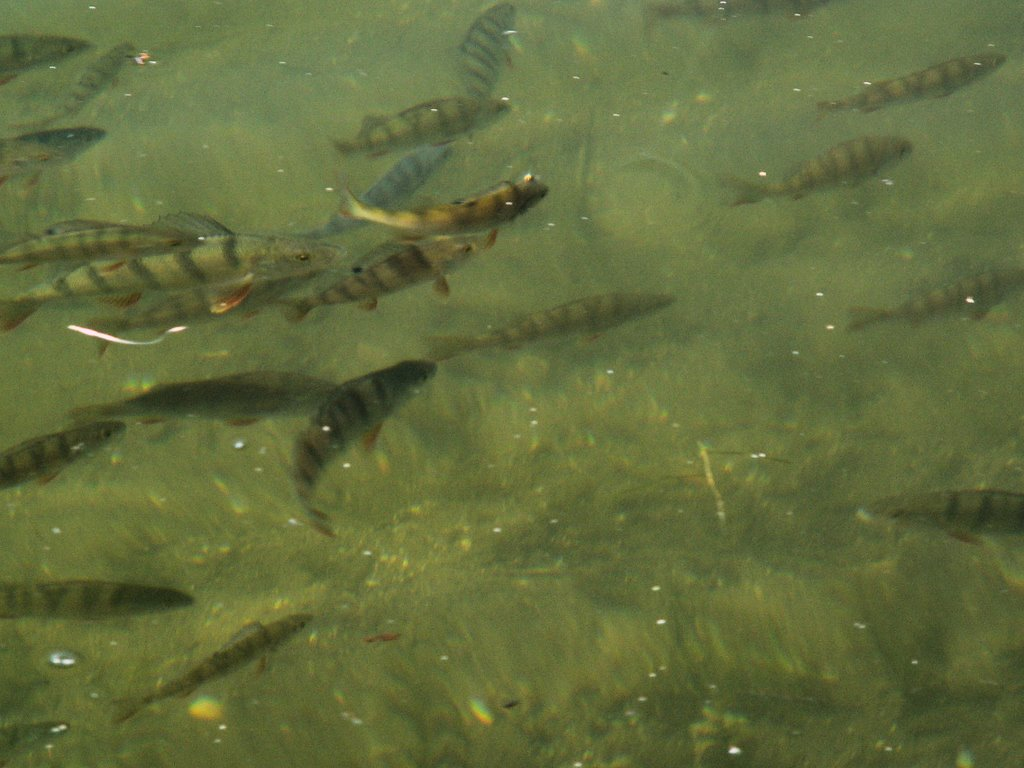
Perch abound in rivers and restaurants

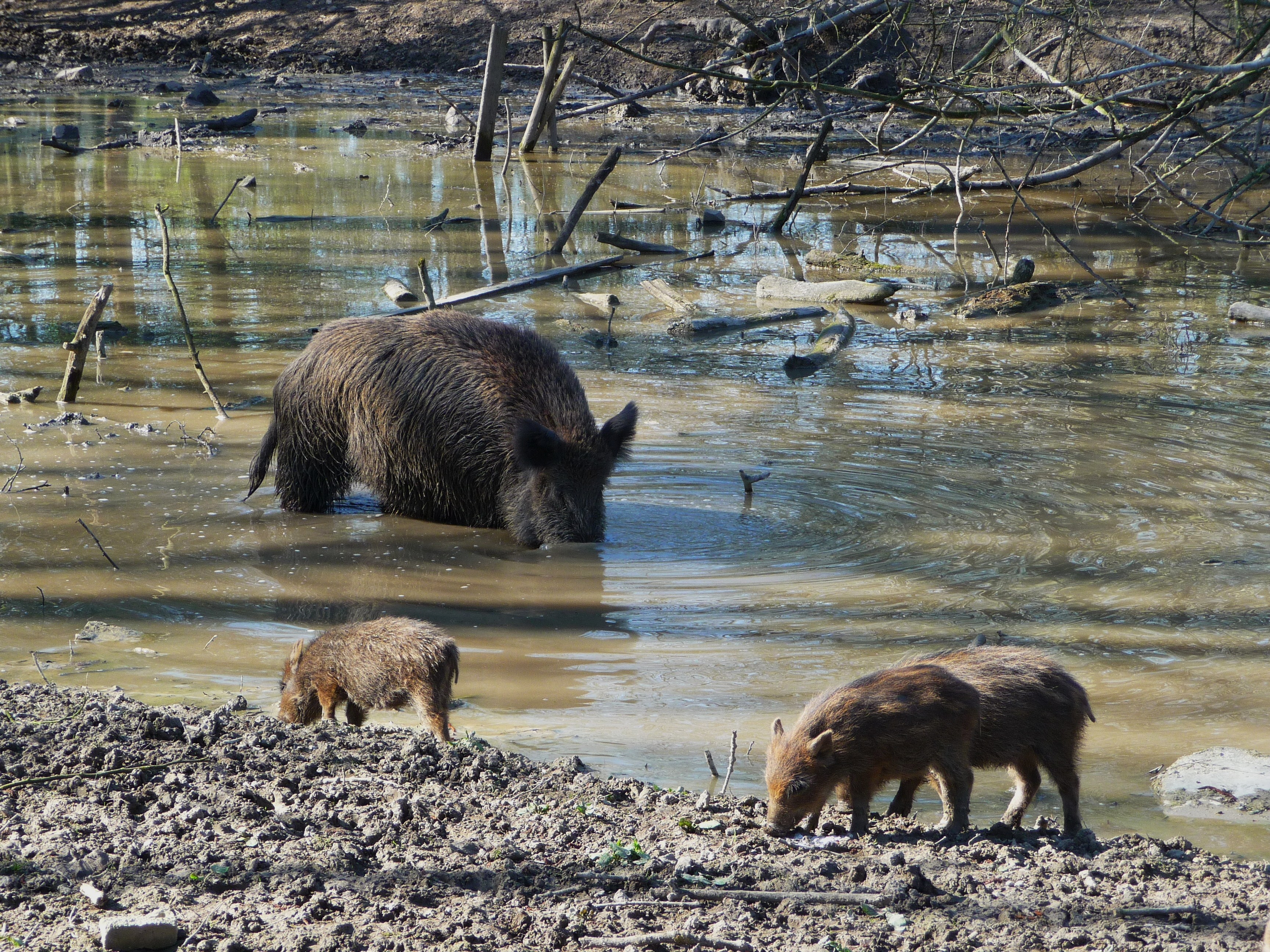
Wild boars are common in all wooded areas along E11

== History ==
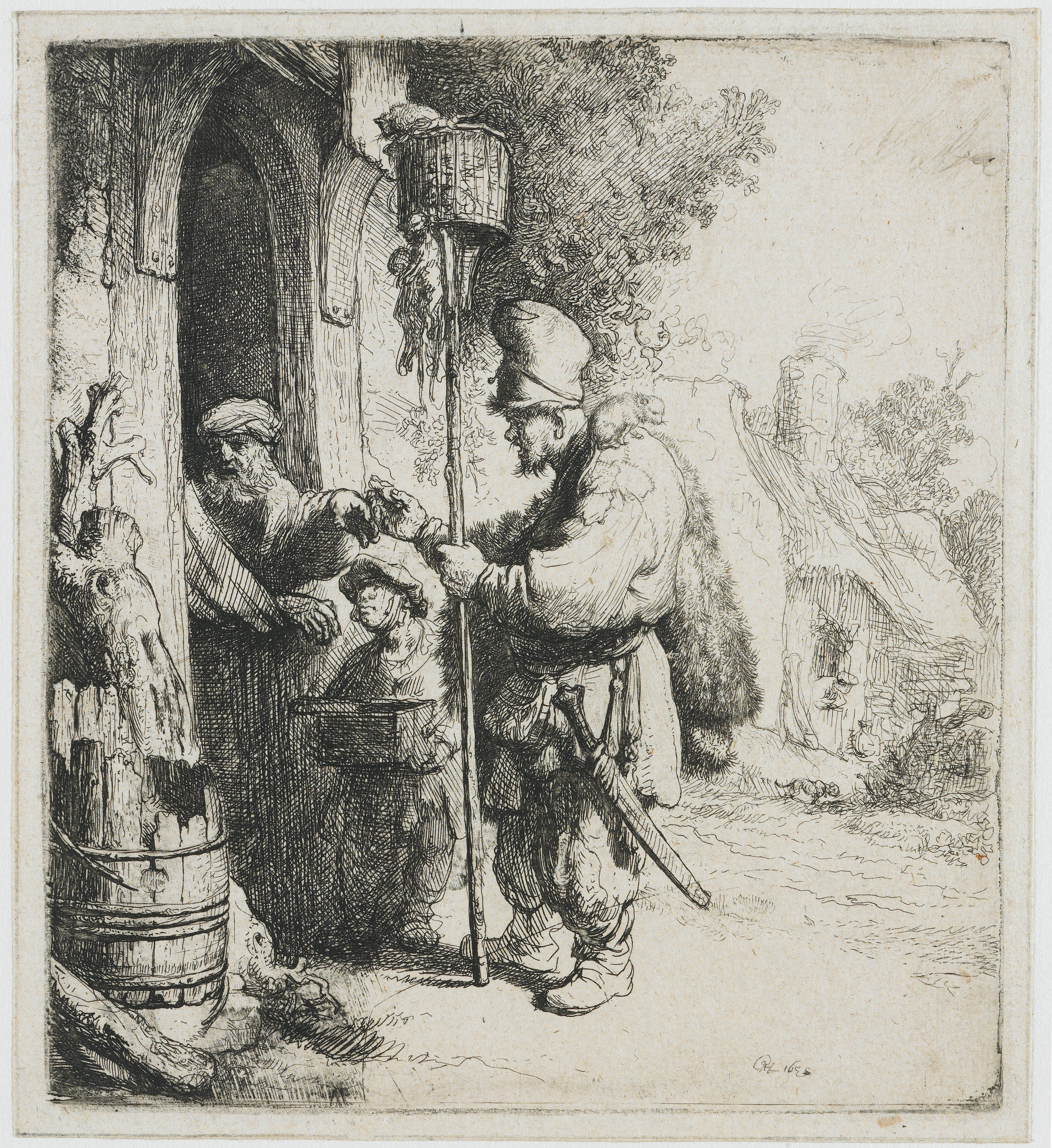
Portrait of a peddler by Rembrandt

In a sense, E11 is the oldest European footpath among the ERA network. There is archeological evidence that messengers and traders followed the range of low hills in what is now Northern Germany, thousands of years ago. Especially after the Middle Ages, the route became a backbone of east–west trade. Pedlars and other travelers preferred the dry and sandy ridge to the swamps to the North and South of it. At present, ramblers feel the same for a different reason: the forested hilltops are more pleasant to walk in than the congested lower areas.

From 1970, a regional hiking trail in Germany was gradually extended into The Netherlands until in 1980 the twin cities Haarlem and Osnabrück could present an ongoing international long distance path from West of Amsterdam to the then internal German border in the Harz Mountains. After the fall of the Berlin Wall in 1989 and the unification of Germany in 1990, the need was felt to extend the trail to the East on a partially new course, partially making use of existing trails in the former East Germany.

Parallel to the extension of the European Union to the East, the E11 was extended over the existing network of Polish local and regional hiking trails.

== E11 in The Netherlands (355 km) ==
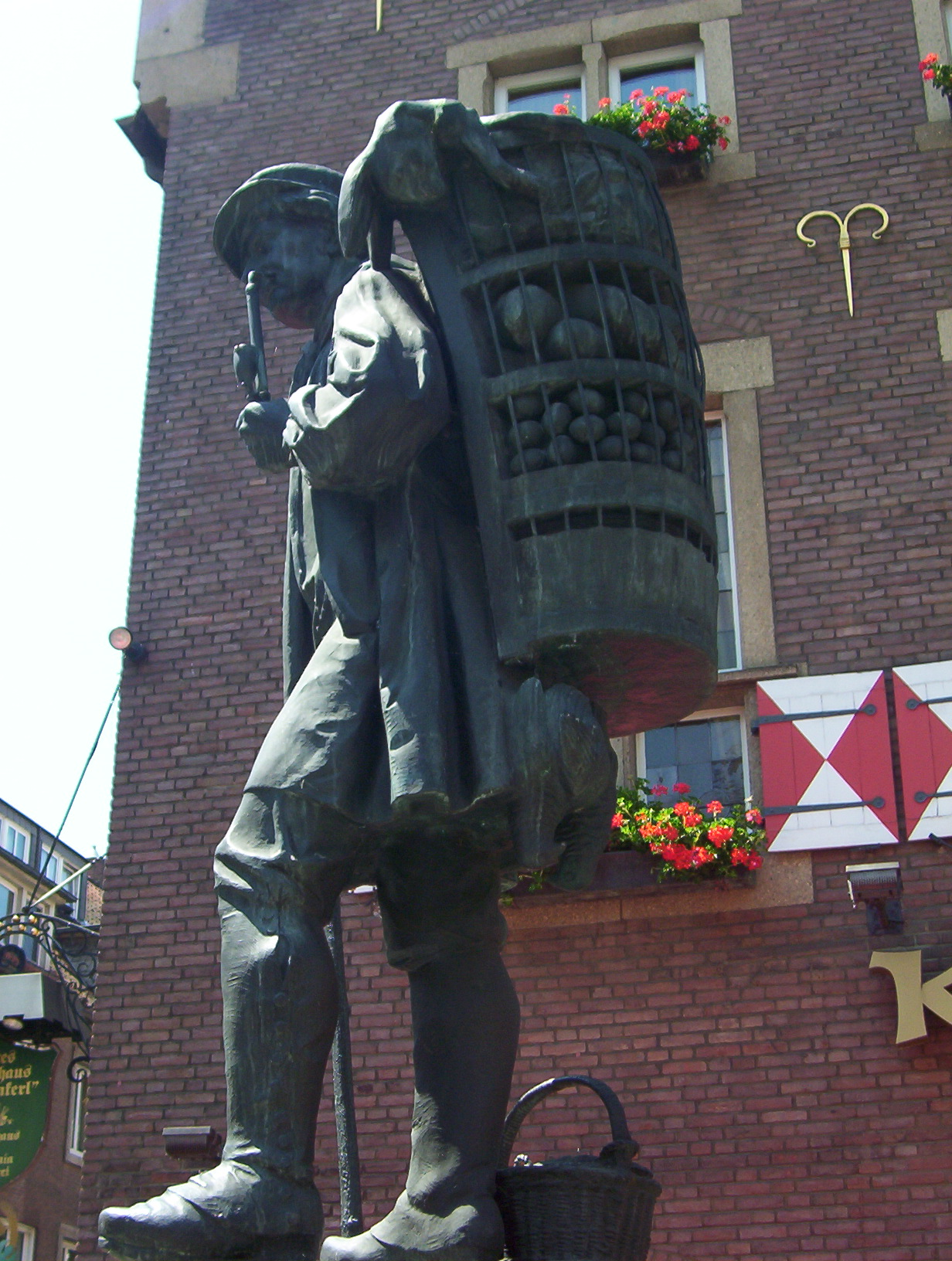
Marskramer; Kiepenkerl; Tödden; Hausierer; Peddler.

The Dutch section of E11 is known as the Marskramerpad ("Peddlers Way"), paying tribute to those who walked through the centuries along the same track. The Marskramerpad links Scheveningen in The Hague over 368 kilometers to the German township of Bad Bentheim. The last 13 km are in Germany, which leaves 355 km for the Netherlands. Like most Dutch long distance trails, the Marskramerpad is managed by Wandelnet, where a detailed guide of the trail can be bought.

The Marskramerpad links some typically Dutch landscapes, such as the wetlands and polders in the West of the country, and the sandy hills and broad river valleys in the Center and East of the country. It also crosses some of the most interesting towns and cities, including The Hague, Leiden, Amersfoort, Deventer and Oldenzaal. (Note: The Marskramerpad/E11 crosses or passes the townships of Scheveningen, The Hague/Den Haag, Wassenaar, Voorschoten, Leiden, Leiderdorp, Hoogmade, Woubrugge, Rijnsaterwoude, various settlements in Nieuwkoop, Breukelen, Maartensdijk, Soest, Amersfoort, Leusden, Achterveld, Terschuur in Barneveld, various settlements in Nijkerk, Stroe and Kootwijk in Barneveld, Hoenderloo, Beekbergen and Klarenbeek in Apeldoorn, Voorst, Deventer, Holten, Rijssen, Delden, Borne, several settlements in Dinkelland, Oldenzaal and, across the German border, Bad Bentheim.)

EUREGIO exploits the eastern part of the Marskramerpad and its continuation in Germany (together forming the stretch Deventer - Bad Bentheim - Osnabrück) under the name of Handelsweg.

== E11 in Germany (996 km) ==
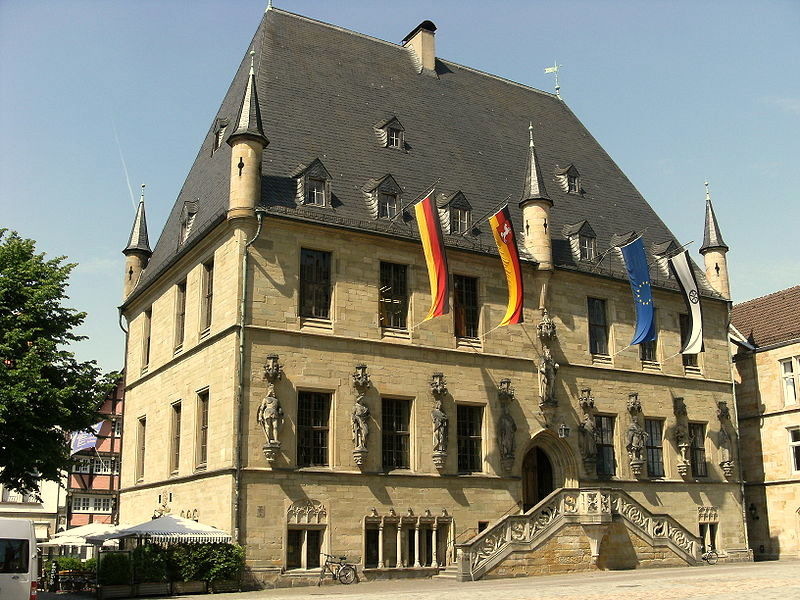
Town hall of Osnabrück

The first 13 kilometers in Germany, through Gildehaus and Bad Bentheim, are part of the Dutch Marskramerpad.

== E11 in Poland (1177 km) ==
In Poland, E11 continues east, then northeast, to pass the cities of Międzychód, Poznań, Gniezno, Toruń, Brodnica, Iława, Olsztyn and Gołdap to the township of Ogrodniki, Sejny County on the Lithuanian border.

=== Międzyrzecz - Poznań-Kiekrz (133 km) ===
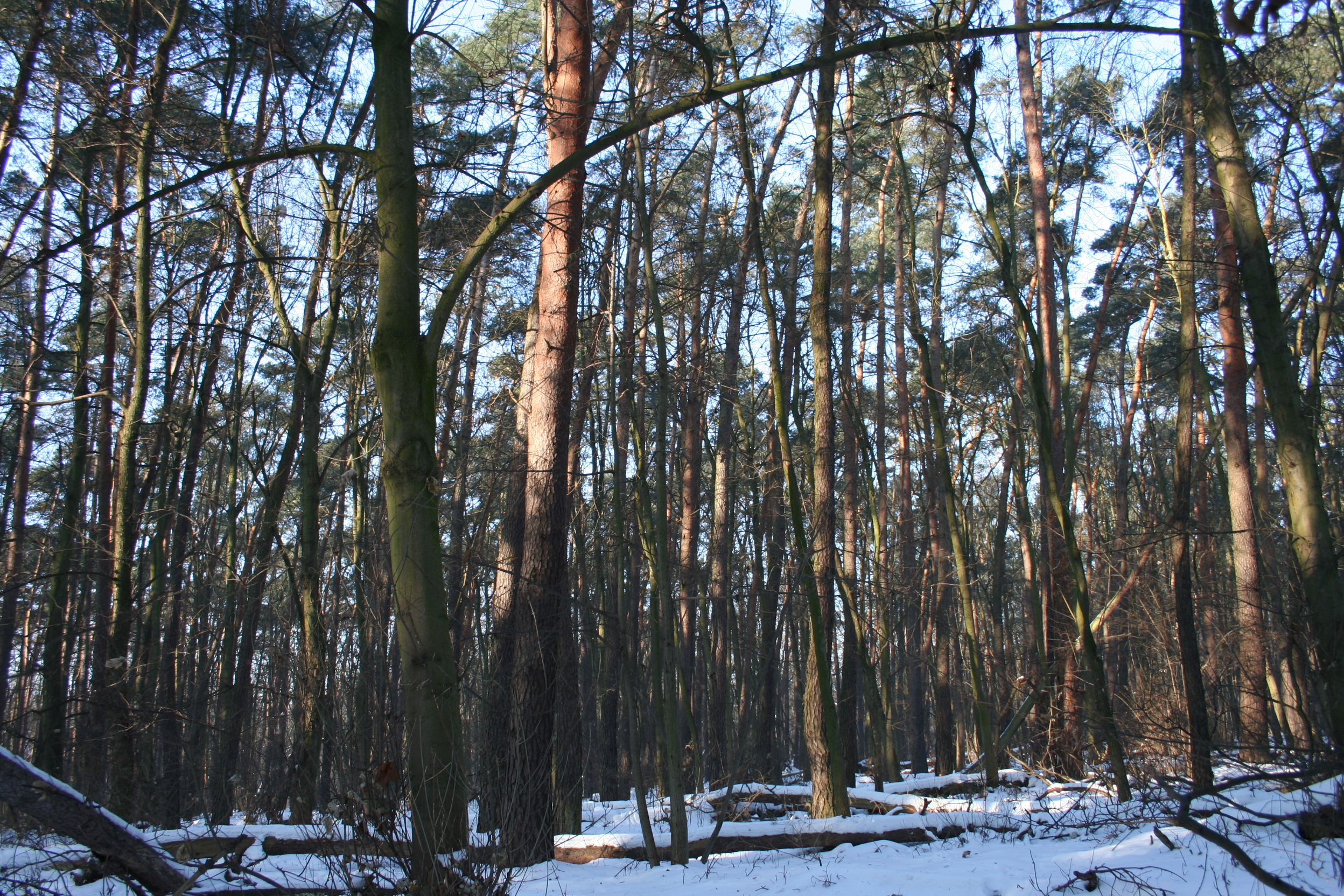
Pine forest near Międzychód

From Bobowicko, the green trail continues till after Stołuń, where E11 begins to follow white-blue-white to Villa Toscana, a lonely hotel between the villages of Nowe Gorzycko and Stare Gorzycko. The blue trail and E11 continue to the twin cities of Międzychód and Bielsko.

E11 leaves the twin cities without markings near the Post Office and the cemetery on National Road # 534. The trail follows roughly the river Drwęcą to the North-East, and the first yellow signs are found in the forest. The trail then alternates between river side woods and agrarian settlements.

== E11 in Lithuania (747 km) ==
The Lithuanian part of E11 is known as "Miško takas" (“Forest Trail”). It starts at Polish - Lithuanian border near the town of Lazdijai in Lithuania and passes through Dzūkija National Park and Žemaitija National Park and eight regional nature parks in Lithuania. The total length of the route in Lithuania is 747 km and it is divided into 5 sections: Dzūkija ethnographic region, Along Nemunas river loops, Kaunas and Kaunas District, Along the banks of the Dubysa river valley, Žemaitija ethnographic region. These sections are divided into ~20 km long stages with accommodation and transport options.

There are specific markers (white-orange-white) on trees and other objects along the route to help you get your bearings in nature and not lose track of the road. In populated areas, it is marked by stickers on road signs and other objects. The Forest Trail can be started from any physically available location and it can be hiked in both ways (there are markers in both directions).

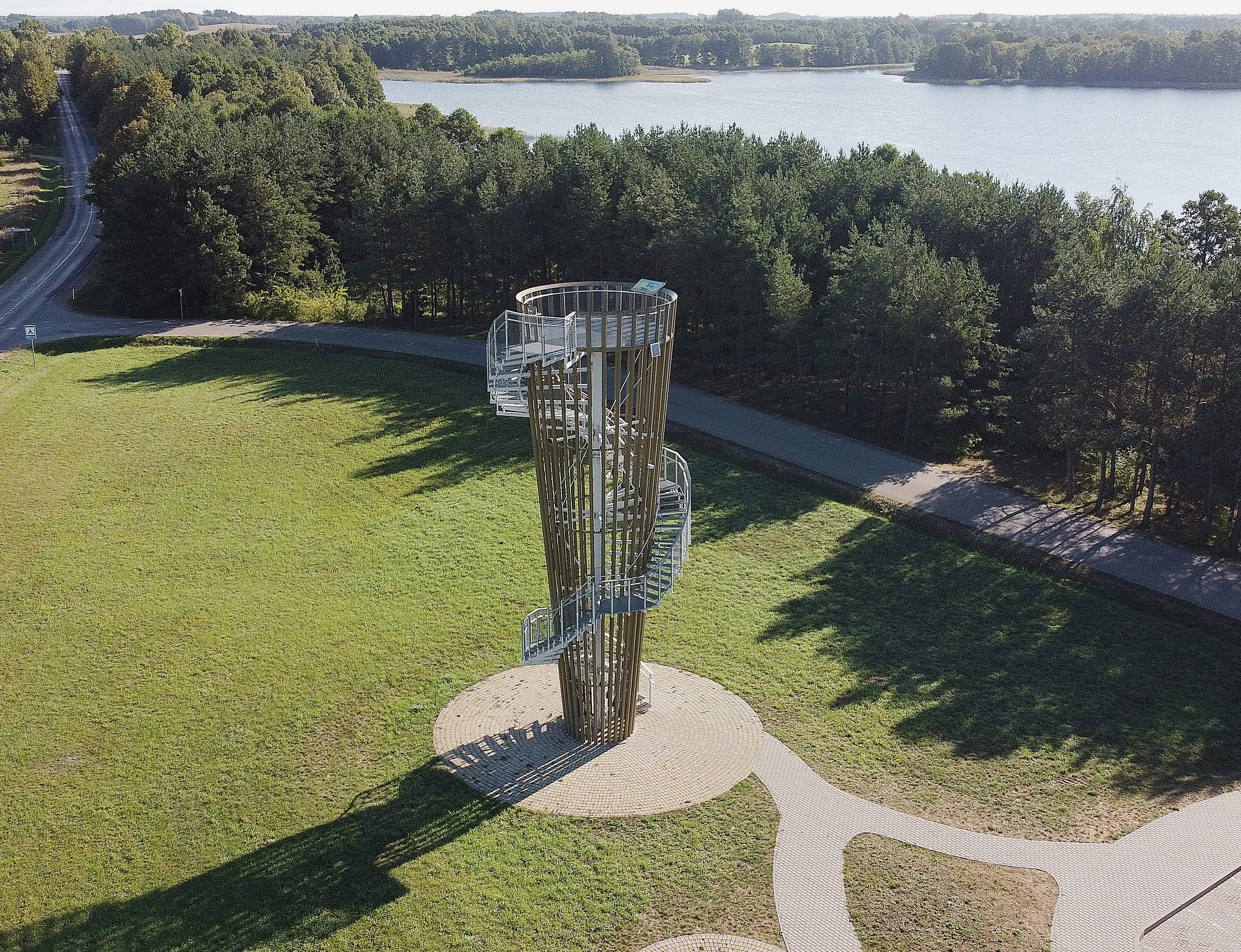
Snaigynas–Veisiejai observation tower, day 52

=== Dzūkija ethnographic region (140 km) ===
The most forested area of Lithuania (Lazdijai (Polish/Lithuanian border) - Nemunaitis, day 51 - 56)

The Dzūkija landscape was shaped by a glacier more than 10,000 years ago. The Forest Trail passes through a vast, sparsely populated woodland and small villages along forest roads. Features and traditions of Dzūkija ethnographic region have been shaped by the forest. People’s occupation and the traditional lifestyle are linked to the forest. Since ancient times, they have been going to the woods to pick and later sell mushrooms. Hence there is the saying of the people of Dzūkija: "If not mushrooms and berries, the girls of Dzūkija would be naked”. The resort of Druskininkai has evolved thanks to springs of salty natural mineral water. The name of the town originates from the Lithuanian word druska — salt. The town of Merkinė, at the confluence of the Merkys and the Nemunas, is among the oldest settlements in Lithuania. In this region, the Forest Trail passes through Dzūkija National Park.

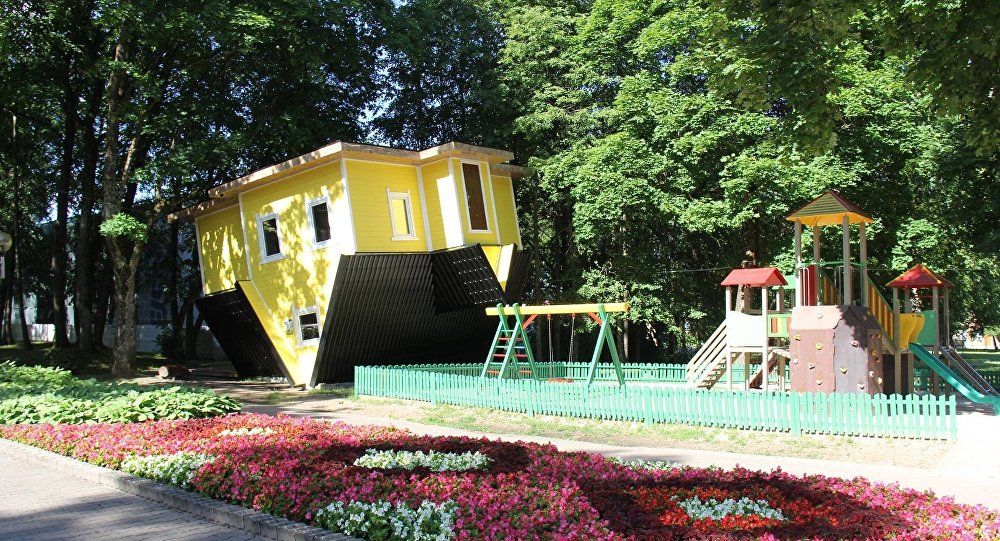
Inverted house - museum of Illusions, day 54

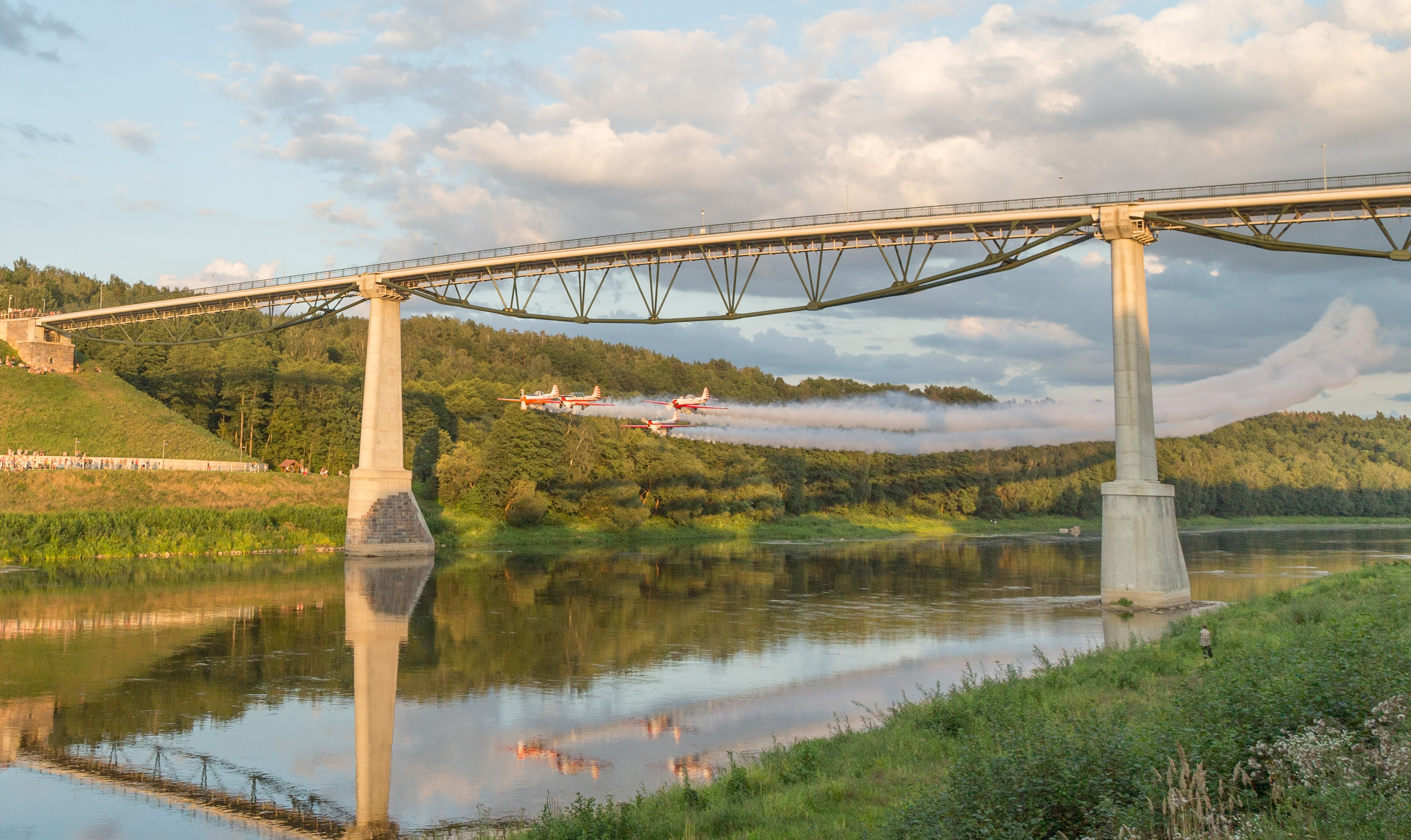
White Rose Bridge, day 57

Highlights: Dzūkija forests - rich in mushrooms and berries, blossom of yellow dwarf everlasts, swimming in clear lake-waters, Druskininkai resort town and salt water springs, spectacular landscapes of Sūduva and Dzūkija Uplands, Dzūkija National Park — an intact area where people live in harmony with nature, ethnographic villages with wooden building, hive trees and craft traditions.

=== Along Nemunas river loops (111 km) ===
Ancient pinewood of Punia, spectacular riverside slopes and mineral water resort (Nemunaitis - Pakuonis, day 57 - 61)

The Forest Trail meanders along the wooded banks of the Nemunas through Nemunas Loops Regional Park (Nemuno kilpų regioninis parkas). In the stretch of the Nemunas between Alytus and Pakuonis, where the river forms several large loops with outcrops up to 40 m high, exceptionally picturesque landscapes abound. Nemunaitis, like a majority of Lithuania’s small villages, features an impressive brick-and-stone church, while Alytus Castle-mound inhabited by ancient Lithuanians dates back to as early as the 14th century. Today Alytus features the tallest pedestrian bridge in Lithuania and recreational parks. Birštonas, a resort town on the right bank of the Nemunas, is a popular mud therapy resort with springs of medicinal mineral water. At Birštonas, visitors can treat themselves with mineral water for free at specially designed public places.

Highlights: The tallest pedestrian bridge in Lithuania in Alytus, green parks of the Alytus town, Nemunas Loops and spectacular outcrops on the riverbanks, resort of Birštonas and mineral water springs, parks and recreational zones of Prienai town, tall castle-mounds and churches on the riverbanks, wooden crucifixes and chapels on the roadside.

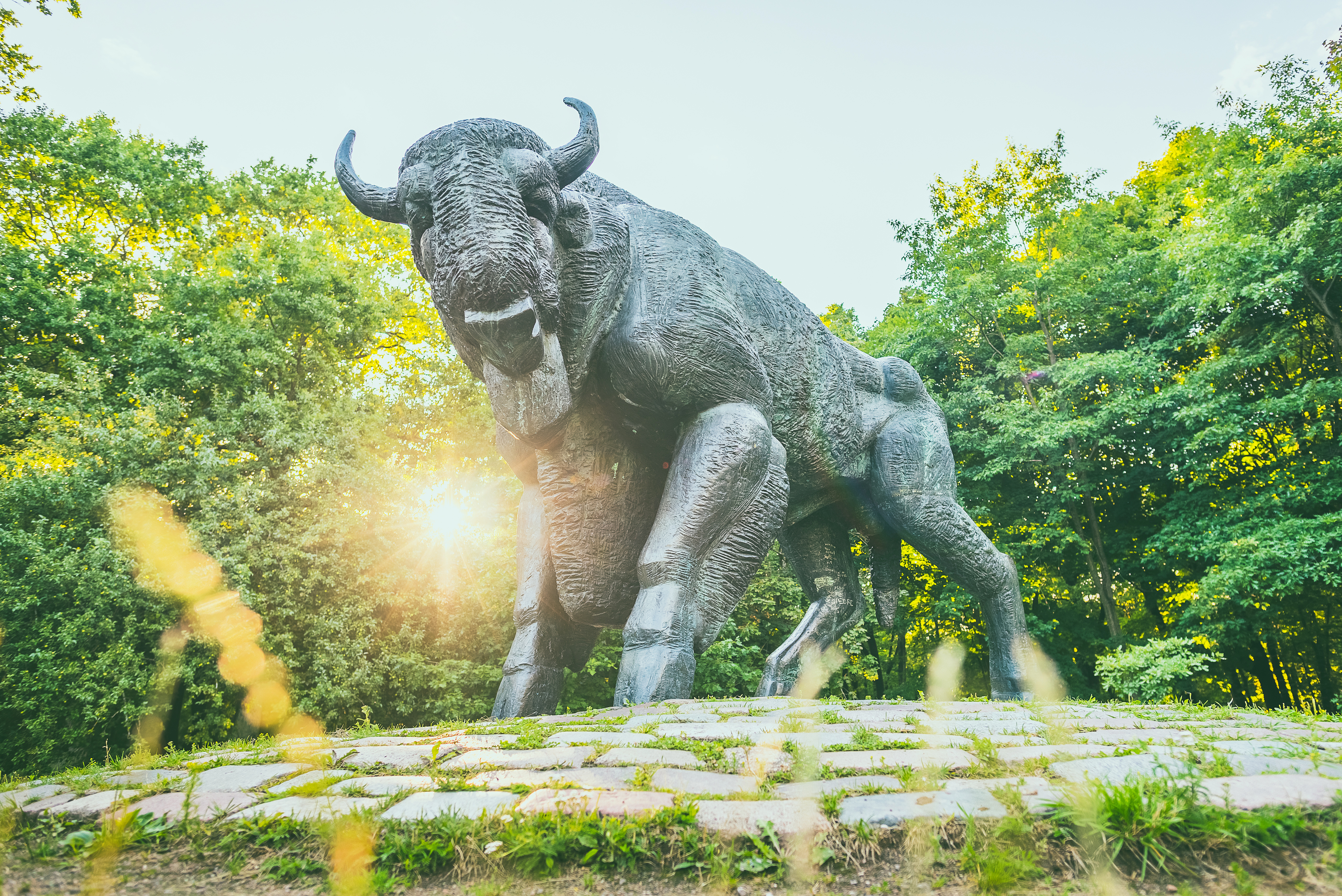
Oak-Wood Park, day 63

=== Kaunas and Kaunas district (79 km) ===
Picturesque towns surrounded by greenery and interwar architecture at the confluence of two rivers (Pakuonis - Vilkija, day 62 - 66)

Kaunas, one of the most beautiful Lithuanian cities, is located at the confluence of the Nemunas and the Neris. It is Lithuania’s second largest city, the capital of the former Kovno Governorate of the Russian Empire (1842–1915) and the interim capital of Lithuania (1919–1940). Panemunės šilas is the largest park in Kaunas, with beaches on the bank of the Nemunas, bicycle lanes and footpaths. Lampėdis quarry (125 ha) used to be a gravel extraction site. Its banks serve as a popular recreational and bathing area for townspeople.

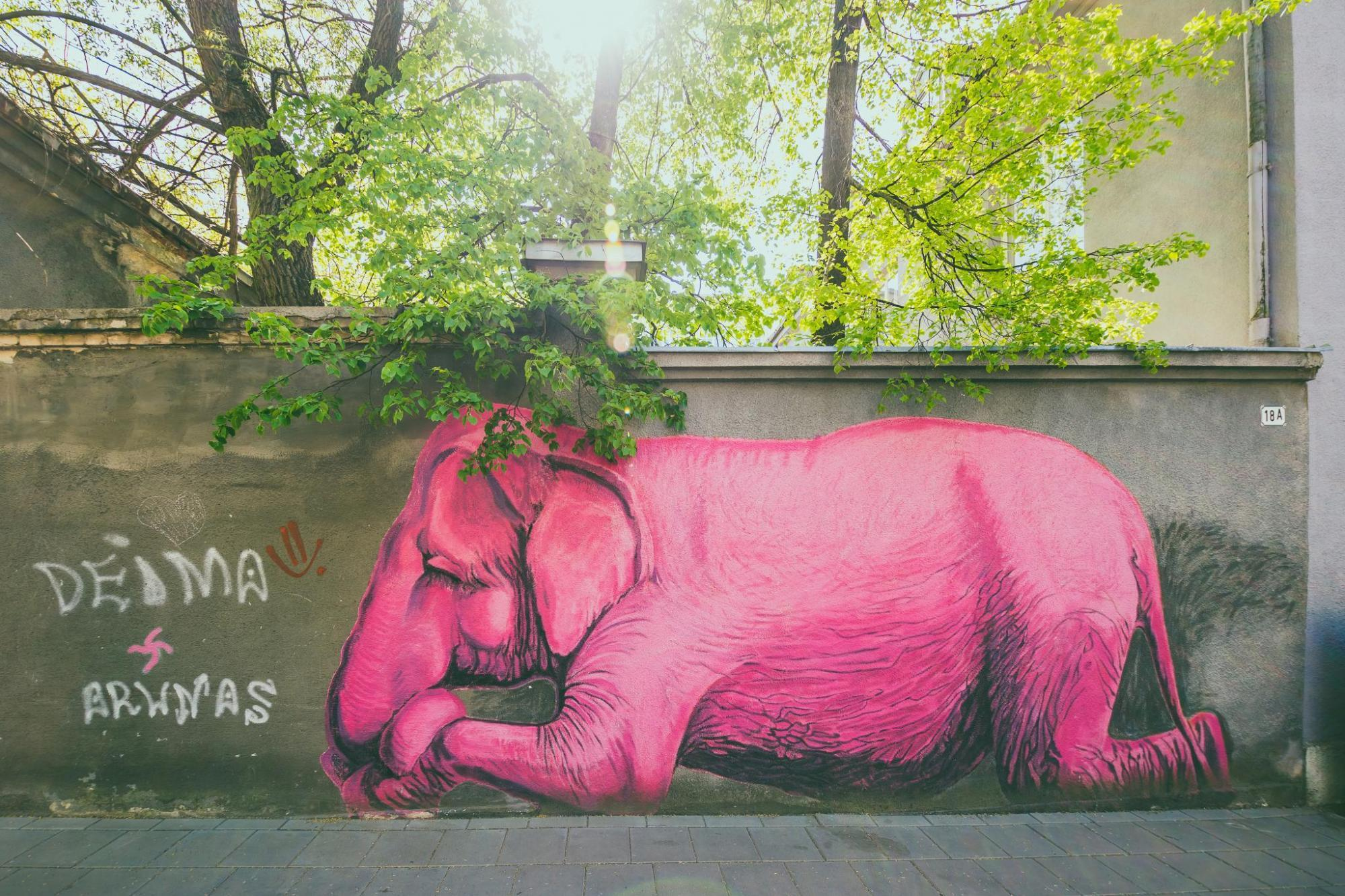
Drawing “The Pink Elephant”, day 64

Making a loop through the resort town of Kulautuva, a footpath and a bicycle lane stretches along the Nemunas as far as to Vilkija and offers beautiful views over the river. On the way to Vilkija, a diverse landscape with small settlements, castle-mounds and forests can be enjoyed.

Highlights: Kauno Marios Regional Park with the unique landscape of the embankment complex and rock outcrops, modernist architecture of 1919–1940 in Kaunas — the European heritage, forests and parks of the city of Kaunas, blossoming meadows on the banks of the Nemunas, Kulautuva — a popular resort with pine forests, green parks and a sandy beach, ferry across the Nemunas at Vilkija — a live witness of by-gone times.

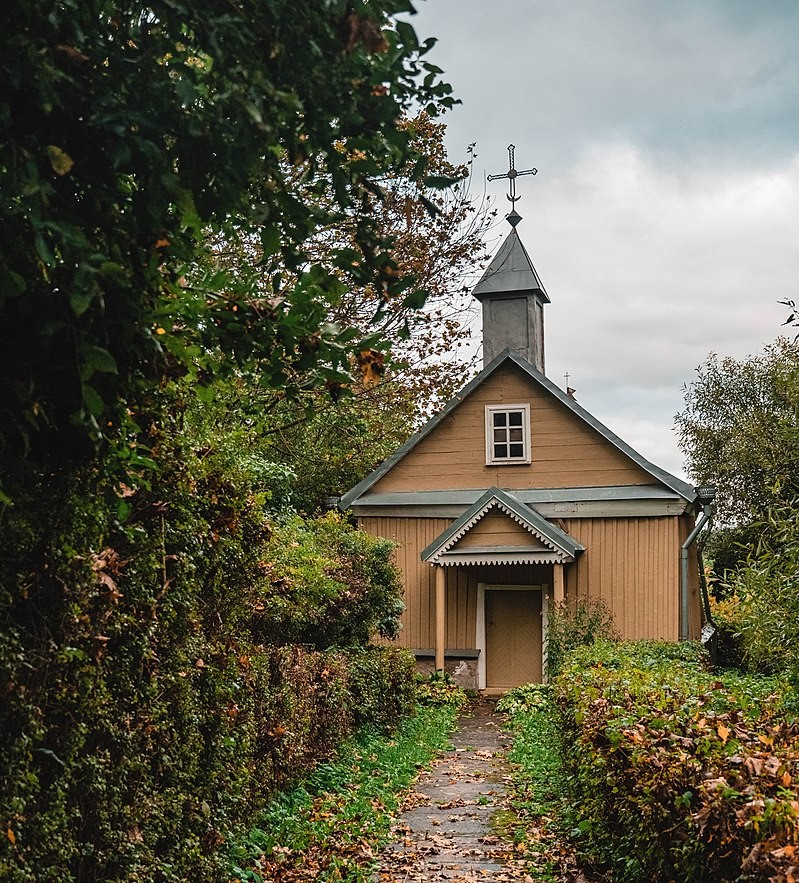
Ugioniai chapel, day 69

=== Along the banks of the Dubysa river valley (141 km) ===
Multicoloured meadows of Lithuania’s most picturesque river valley (Vilkija - Dengtiltis, day 67 - 72)

For a-day-and-a-half walk, the Forest Trail passes through Dubysa Regional Park (Dubysos regioninis parkas), where castle-mounds, historical churches and other testimonies of culture and history dot the riverbanks. The Dubysa is a beautiful river favoured by nature lovers because of its rapid flow. The Dubysa is shallow, water in the river is clear, and campsites and camps have been established on its sandy banks. The Forest Trail passes through the historic settlements of Betygala, Ugionius and Šiluva and finally reaches Tytuvėnai Regional Park. The most valuable natural asset of the park is lakes surrounded by wetlands — an important habitat for many animals and birds, including thousands of cranes. The town of Tytuvėnai is renowned for the Baroque-style Bernardine monastery and church, built in the 17th century. Šiluva is an important Catholic-pilgrimage site.

Highlights: rapid and clear waters of the river Dubysa and the deep valley, fortified castle-mounds and wooden crosses in Dubysa Regional Park, tallest and longest railway bridge in Lithuania, Šiluva — place of one of the first apparitions of Virgin Mary in Europe (1608), Tytuvėnai Regional Park — a land of lakes and forests, Tytuvėnai Monastery — among the most beautiful pilgrimage destinations in Lithuania.

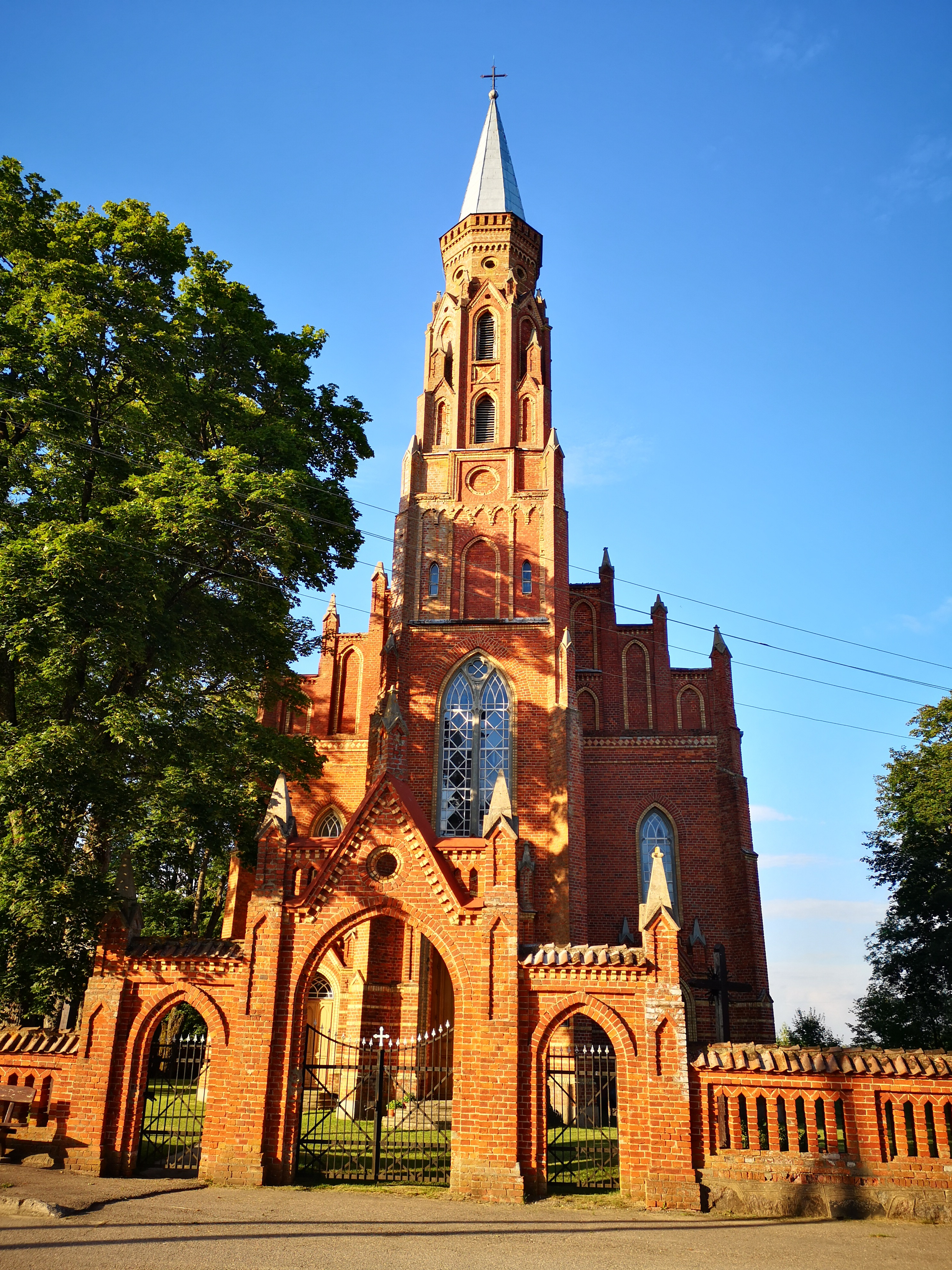
Church of the Sacred Heart of Jesus in Gadūnavas, day 80

=== Žemaitija ethnographic region (276 km) ===
Through Žemaitija upland (Dengtiltis - Lithuanian/Latvian border, day 73 - 86)

The Forest Trail passes through Kurtuvėnai, Varniai and Salantai Regional Parks and Žemaitija National Park, presenting the natural and cultural heritage of Žemaitija ethnographic region. The Forest Trail opens a view on a hilly and wooded landscape, dotted with lakes, rivers, streams, swamps and springs. More than a half of the Žemaitija National Park area is covered in forest, mainly thick and dark fir forests and natural, old coniferous and mixed forests, while the open areas feature meadows. Forests and hills conceal what once was human settlements and castle-mounds. The forest trail passes through the unique villages and towns of Žemaitija where people have preserved their dialect, customs and traditional holidays (Shrove Tuesday, Midsummer Night).

Highlights: Kurtuvėnai Regional Park — a land of forests, including intervening fishing ponds and small lakes, landscapes of Žemaitija and views from the queen of the Lithuanian hills – Šatrija, Telšiai — town on seven hills by Lake Mastis, Žemaitija National Park where the largest and deepest lake in Žemaitija - Plateliai Lake - surrounded by forests and swamps, Žemaičių Kalvarija — pilgrimage destination where the Roman Catholic festival dedicated to St. Mary takes place every year, Mosėdis — a town of stones with a unique display of boulders, Žemaitian dialect, customs and traditional festivals.

== E11 in Latvia (674 km) ==
The Latvian part of E11 is known as "Mežtaka" (“Forest Trail”). It goes through Rietumkursa Upland, Venta Valley Nature Reserve and Abava River Valley Nature Park, Kemeri National park and Gauja National park, Northern Gauja and Veclaicene protected landscape area. The total length of the route in Latvia is 674 km and it is divided into 9 sections: South Kurzeme region, Kuldīga and surroundings, Abava river valley, Tukums and Ķemeri National park, Jūrmala and Rīga, Riga and Pieriga, Gauja National Park, Northern Gauja Forestland, Veclaicene Forestland. These sections are divided into ~20 km long stages with accommodation and transport options. Most of the route leads on forest roads and trails, about a third on gravel roads. Only a small part of the route, which is outside the big cities, leads on asphalt roads. Some parts of the Forest Trail in Kemeri and Gauja National Parks coincide with already exciting hiking trails and other tourist routes.

There are specific markers (white-orange-white) on trees and other objects along the route to help you get your bearings in nature and not lose track of the road. In populated areas, it is marked by stickers on road signs and other objects. The Forest Trail can be started from any physically available location and it can be hiked in both ways (there are markers in both directions).

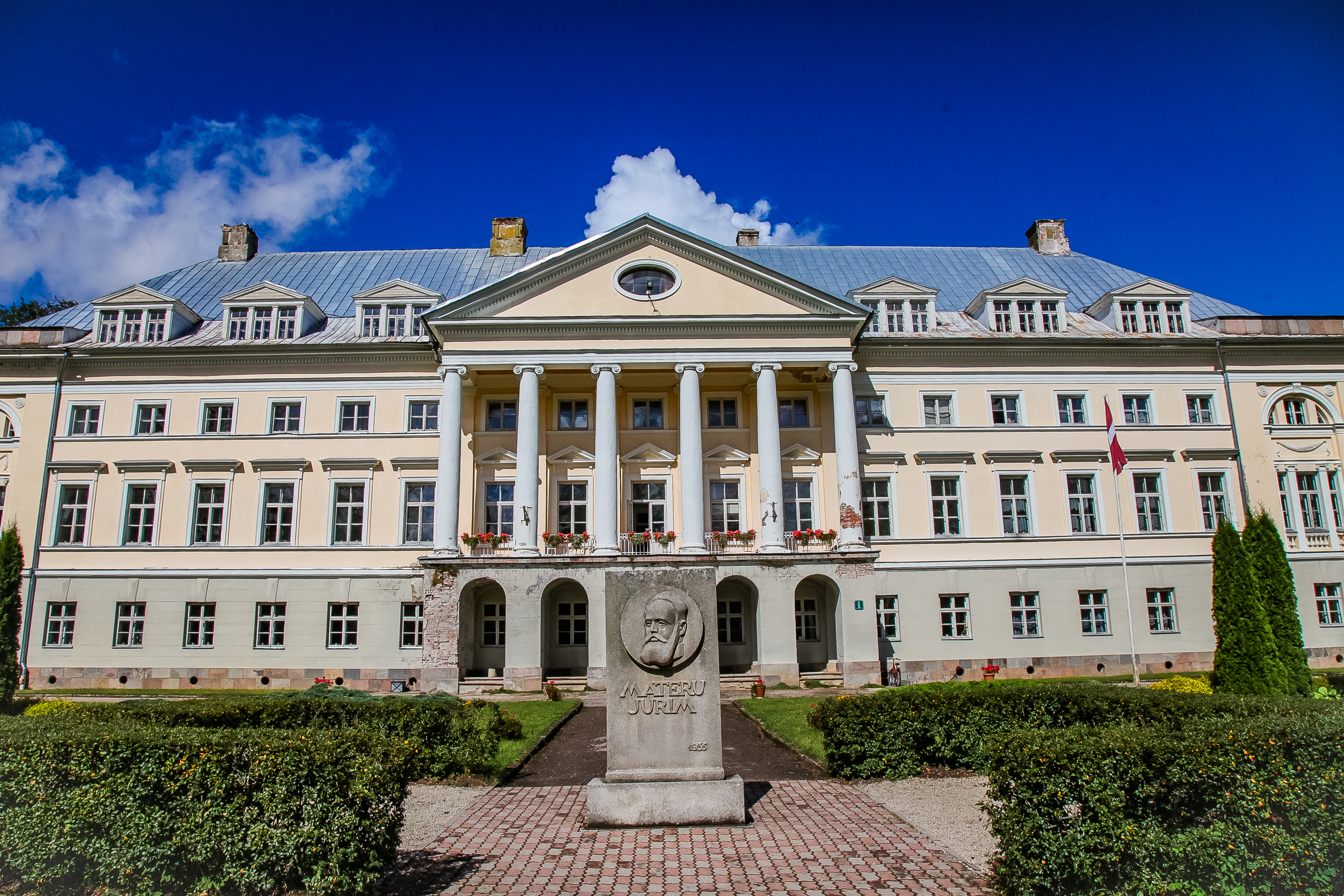
Kazdanga palace and manor complex, day 91

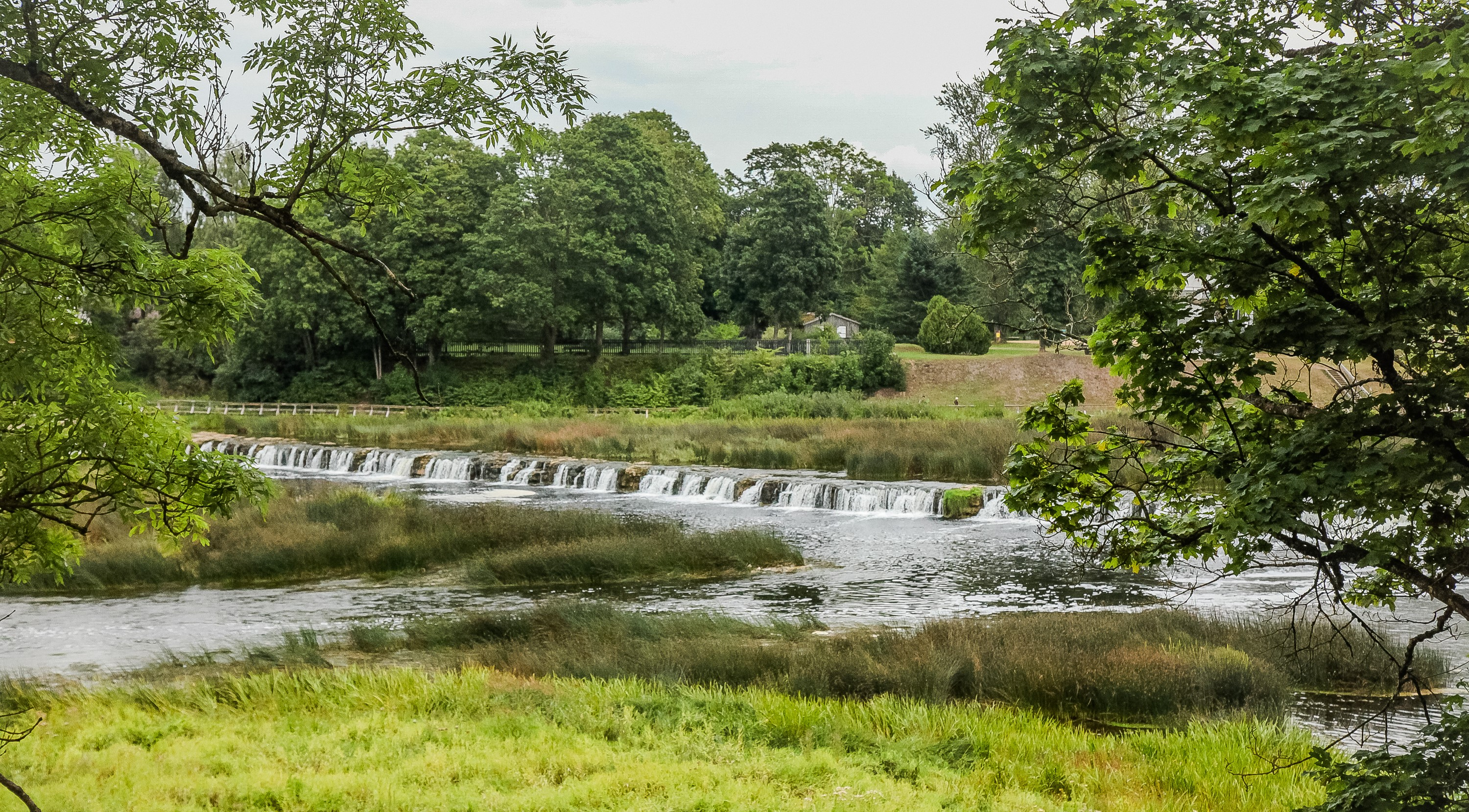
Venta rapid, day 92

=== South Kurzeme region (111 km) ===
Along the hills and river valleys of Rietumkursa Upland (Lithuanian – Latvian border – Snēpele, day 87 - 91)

Southern Kurzeme is also referred to as Leišmale — the area next to the Lithuanian border. The landscape features no old homesteads or villages, as they were destroyed in World War II, and the area around the Forest Trail is dominated by agricultural landscapes sparingly interspersed with wooded areas. The Swedish Gate in Priekule, built in 1688, adorned with the ducal coats of arms of the von Korff and von Redern families, chiselled in sandstone from Gotland, as well as the 18–19th century historical buildings in Aizpute, are testimonies of by-gone times.

Highlights: panoramic views of Rietumkursa Upland, spectacular gravel quarries at Gramzda, cultivated cereals fields and buckwheat fields in blossom, deep and cool Ruņupe Valley, landscape of Kazdanga Park and ponds, delicious cheese of Kazdanga, historical wooden architecture of Aizpute, wine-making traditions of Aizpute.

=== Kuldīga and surroundings (53 km) ===
Charm of the old town of Kuldīga and the widest waterfall of Europe (Snēpele - Renda, day 92 - 93)

In the 16–17th century, Kuldīga served as the residence of Duke Jacob Kettler of Courland (Kurzeme) and Semigallia (Zemgale). During his 40-year reign, the Duchy saw an economic boom. Cobbled streets of Kuldīga, old buildings, the river Alekšupīte, running through the town, St. Catherine’s Church and organ music concerts in it, gourmet restaurants and a country delicatessen shop in the town centre is a great travel experience to enjoy in a leisurely ambience of a small town. The red-brick bridge over the river Venta is a landmark of the town. The widest waterfall of Europe, Ventas rumba (width 100–110 m) lies on the Venta. Since it is only about 1.6–2.2 m tall, once a year you can watch flying fish there, when during spawning in spring, vimba breams jump over the waterfall. Vast Kurzeme woodlands stretch from Kuldīga.

Highlights: Ostrich-watching in the vicinity of Snēpele, Pelči Manor and its fish ponds, lovely cats of the old town of Kuldīga, leisurely walk on the banks of the Alekšupīte, refreshing bathing by the waterfall (Ventas Rumba), historic brick bridge over the river Venta in Kuldīga, Riežupa sandstone caves — a maze with the greatest total length of underground passages in Latvia, waterfalls on the river Īvande at Renda.

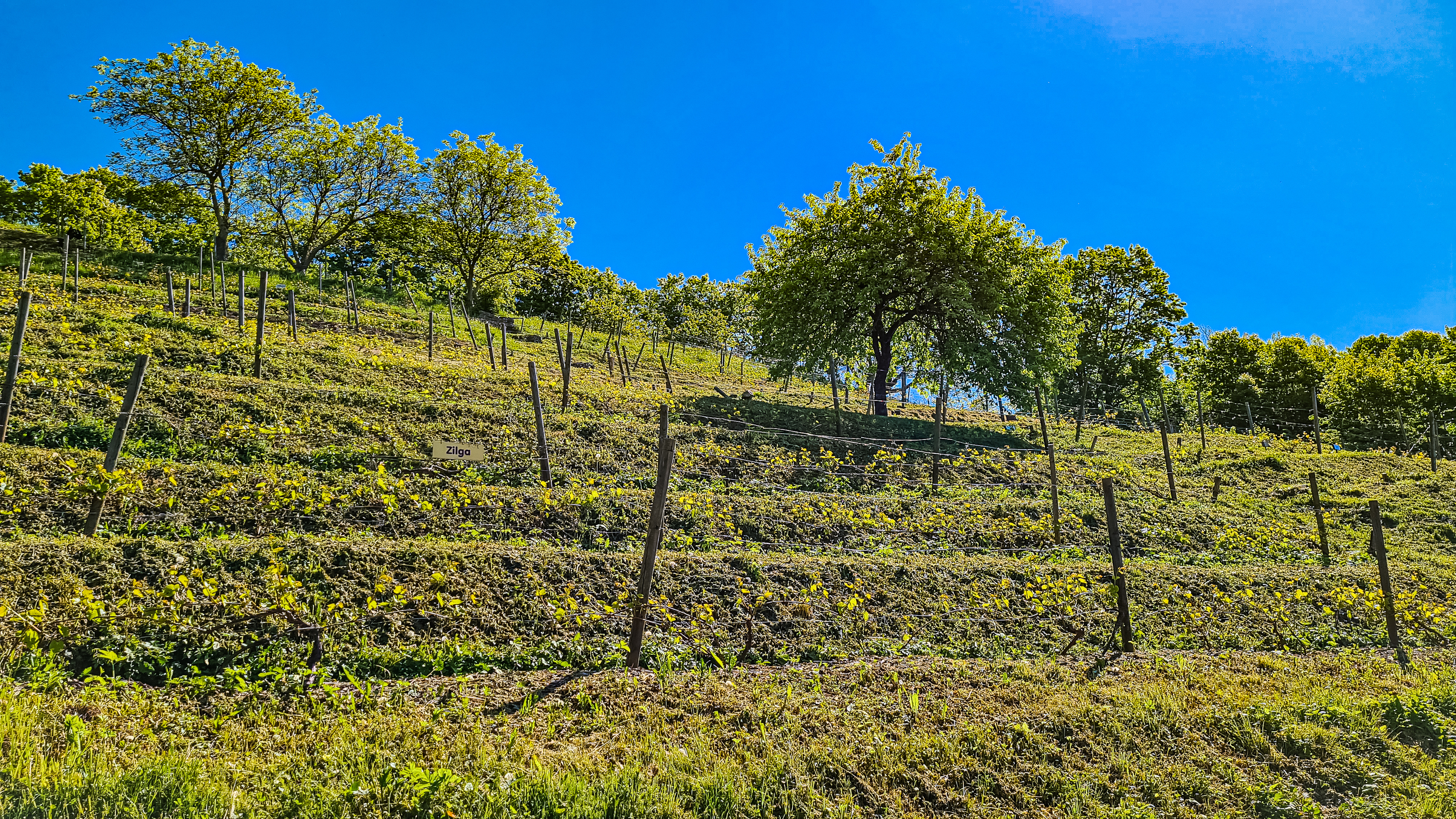
Sabile Wine Hill, day 94

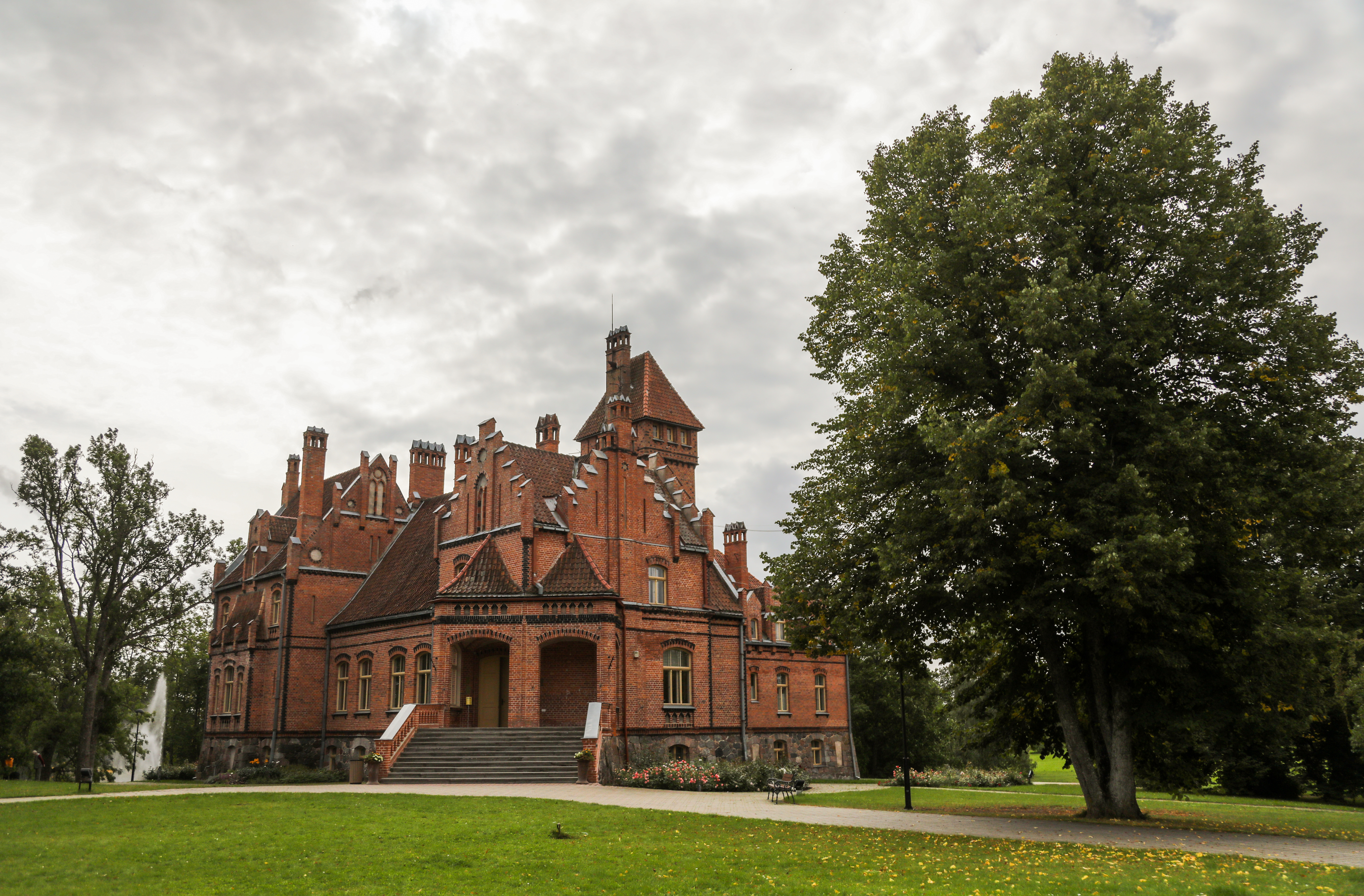
Jaunmoku palace, day 96

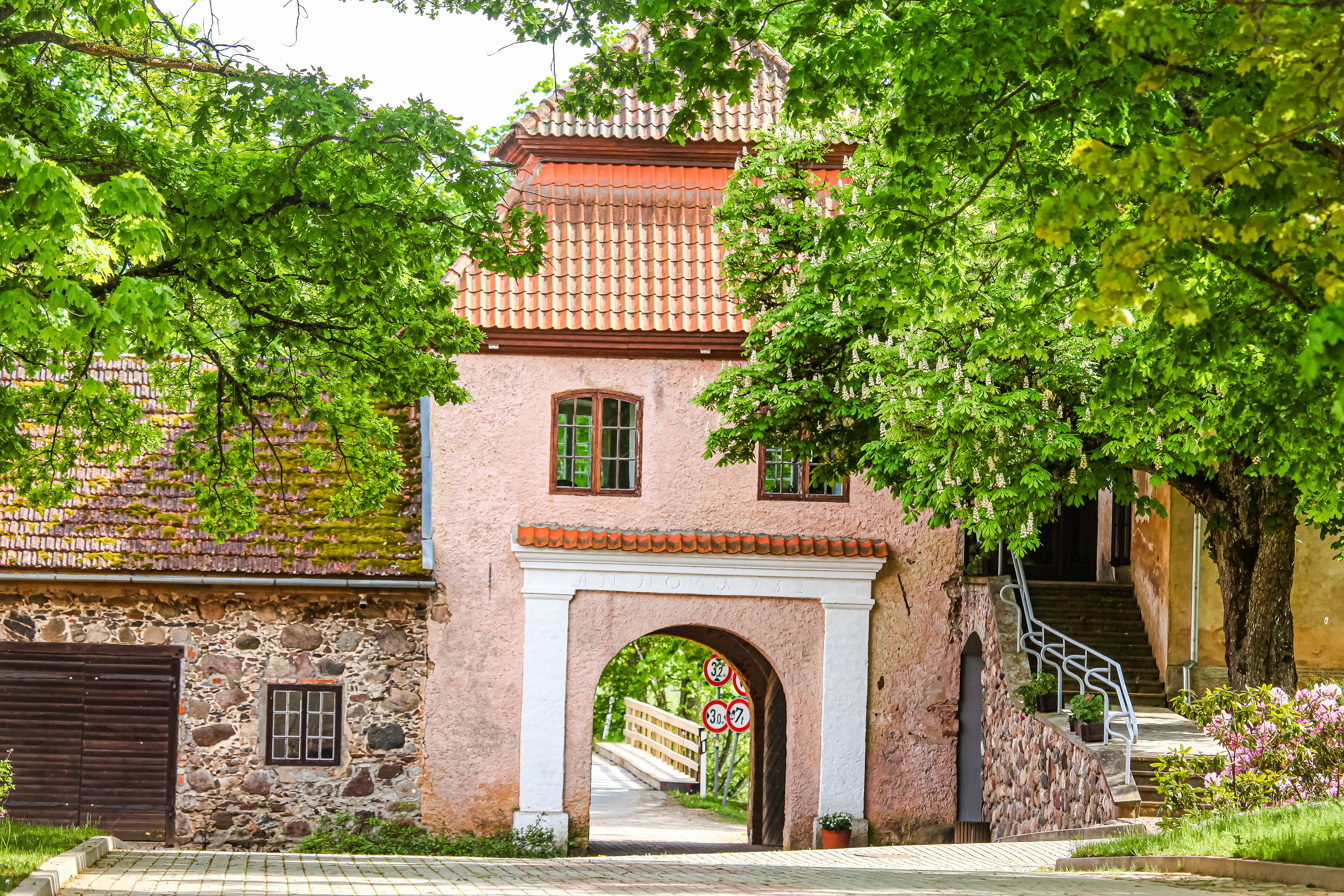
Šlokenbeka Manor and the Latvian Road Museum, day 98

=== Abava River valley (70 km) ===
Past the vineyards of the Abava valley (Renda - Jaunmoku palace, day 94 - 96)

The Abava Valley is up to 2 km wide and about 30–40 metres deep, so hikers can enjoy beautiful landscapes. In Sabile, you can taste ciders and wines brewed in the vicinity and beyond.The territory of Pedvāle Art Park (less than 100 hectares) features meadows, shrubs, rolling slopes, deep valleys, springs, streams and a winding river. There, an artist residence is established, and exhibitions, concerts, shows are held. The symbol of the town of Kandava is the boulder bridge over the Abava. Natural meadows of the Abava Valley, particularly beautiful in the middle of summer, are sustained by livestock bred for living in the wild. In Pūre, chocolate works that offer tours and tasting are located.

Highlights: Sabile Wine Hill with a vineyard, tasting of Sabile wines and ciders, merry toboggan ride at Zviedru Cepure (the Swedish Cap), landscapes of Abava Valley, instagram-ish Fishmen Bridge over the Abava, mouth-watering Pūre chocolate truffles, exploring forest at the Forest Museum.

=== Tukums and Ķemeri National park (56 km) ===
Ķemeri National park — among the most diverse wetlands in Latvia (Jaunmoku palace - Bigauņciems, day 97 - 99)

The main purpose of creation of Ķemeri National Park is protection of wetlands — shallow coastal waters of the Gulf of Rīga, overgrowing coastal lakes, vast marshlands, wet forests and alluvial meadows — as an important habitat for many plant (25% of the plant species listed in the Latvian Red Book are found in the park) and animal species, especially breeding and migratory birds. One of the largest swamps of Latvia — Great Ķemeri Bog, as well as others — Zaļais purvs (Green Swamp), Raganu purvs (Witches’ Swamp) lie within the park and are passed by the winding Forest Trail. The large marshes are an important site for formation of sulphur water and medicinal mud, which was the basis for establishment of the resort of Ķemeri. Having passed the historic resort of Ķemeri, the Forest Trail meets the Baltic Coastal Hiking Route (E9) at the seaside at Bigauņciems, and both trails follow the same route towards Rīga.

Highlights: avenues of manors and palaces, roses at Tukums, Šlokenbeka Manor — medieval fortified dwelling, the most forest-abundant section of the Forest Trail in Kurzeme, forests rich in mushrooms and berries, raised bogs and wetlands, the historical resort park of Ķemeri, the surface of Lake Slokas and the observation tower, the Gulf of Rīga.

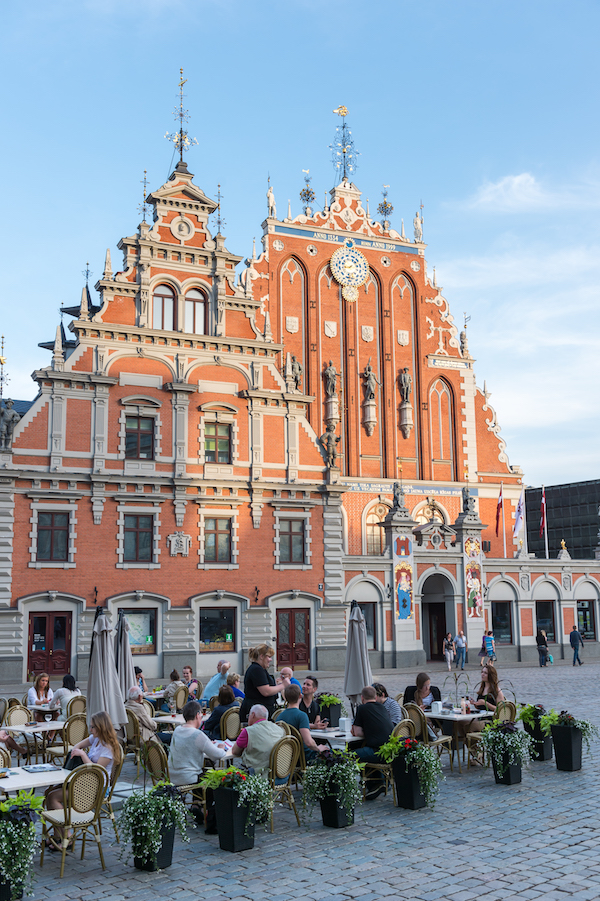
Town Hall Square, day 102

=== Jūrmala and Rīga (51 km) ===
Latvia’s most popular resort town and capital city (Bigauņciems - Dubulti, day 100 - 102)

This section of the Forest Trail passes through the resort town of Jūrmala and the Latvian capital city Rīga. A sandy beach runs along the coast in Jurmala, though hikers can also proceed through the downtown of Jūrmala to see Jomas iela, its main pedestrian street. The town is popular with summer holidaymakers, with many SPA hotels, cafés, live music in summer evenings. The town features unique wooden architecture of the historic summer-house area, and mansions and villas are still being built there. The forests of the coastal dunes are criss-crossed by a dense network of trails suitable for strolling and Nordic walking. The river Lielupe separates Jūrmala from the forests in the outskirts of Rīga. From Priedaine, you can reach Rīga along the roads and trails of the Kleisti forest and suburban streets leading to the Daugava; having crossed the river, you arrive at the very heart of Rīga — Rātslaukums (Town Hall Square). You can walk through Rīga and explore different areas of the city, or use public transport — a train or a bus.

Highlights: wooden architecture of Jūrmala, Ragakāpa Dune Natural Park with a wood-paved footpath, historic buildings of Ķīpsala, Old Town of Rīga — a UNESCO World Heritage Site, Art Nouveau architecture of Rīga, Rīga Central Market.

=== Riga and Pieriga (54 km) ===
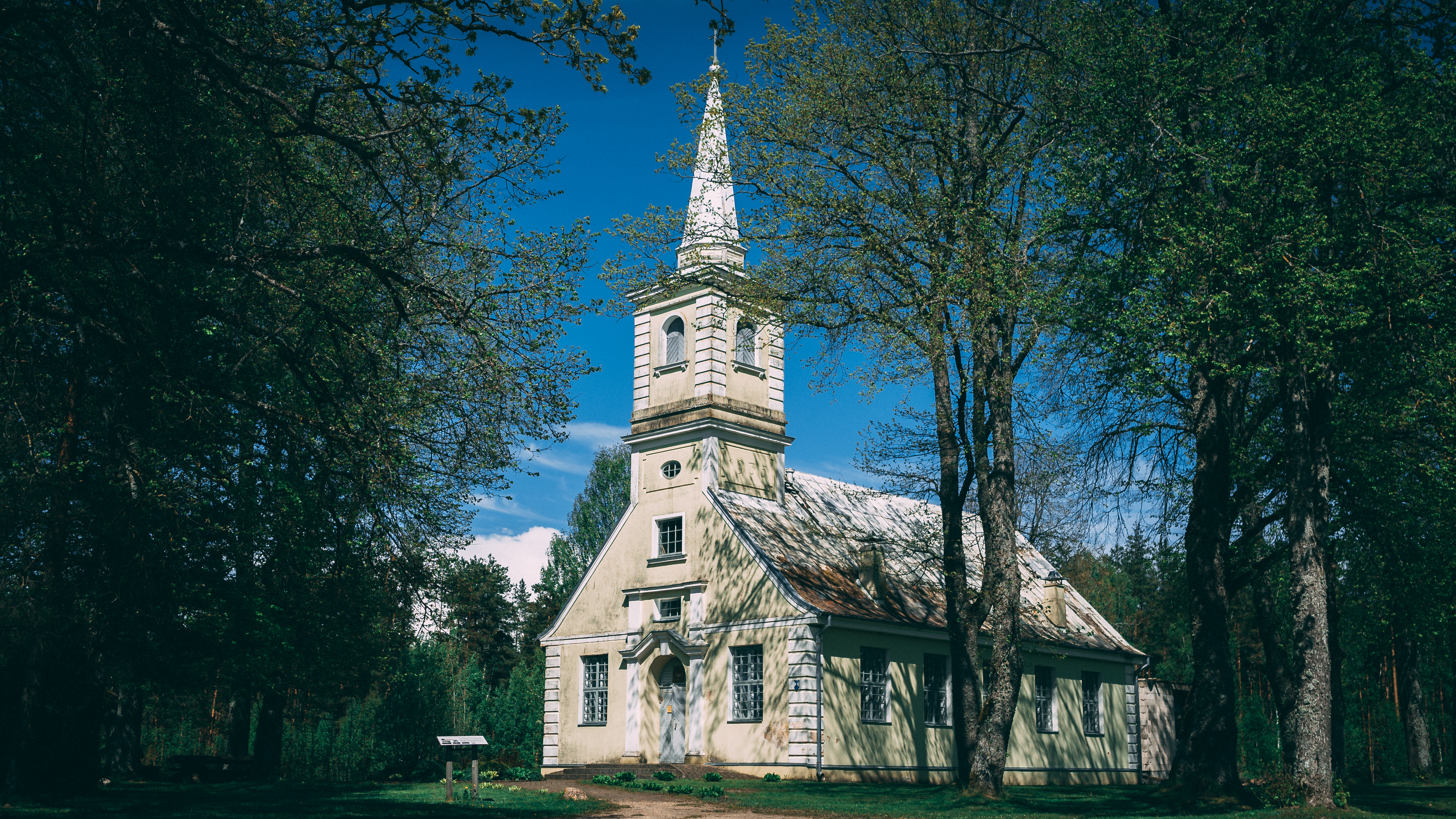
Vangaži Lutheran Church, day 3

The picturesque contrast region – from towers to forests and cliffs (Old Riga - Rāmkalni, day 1 - 3)

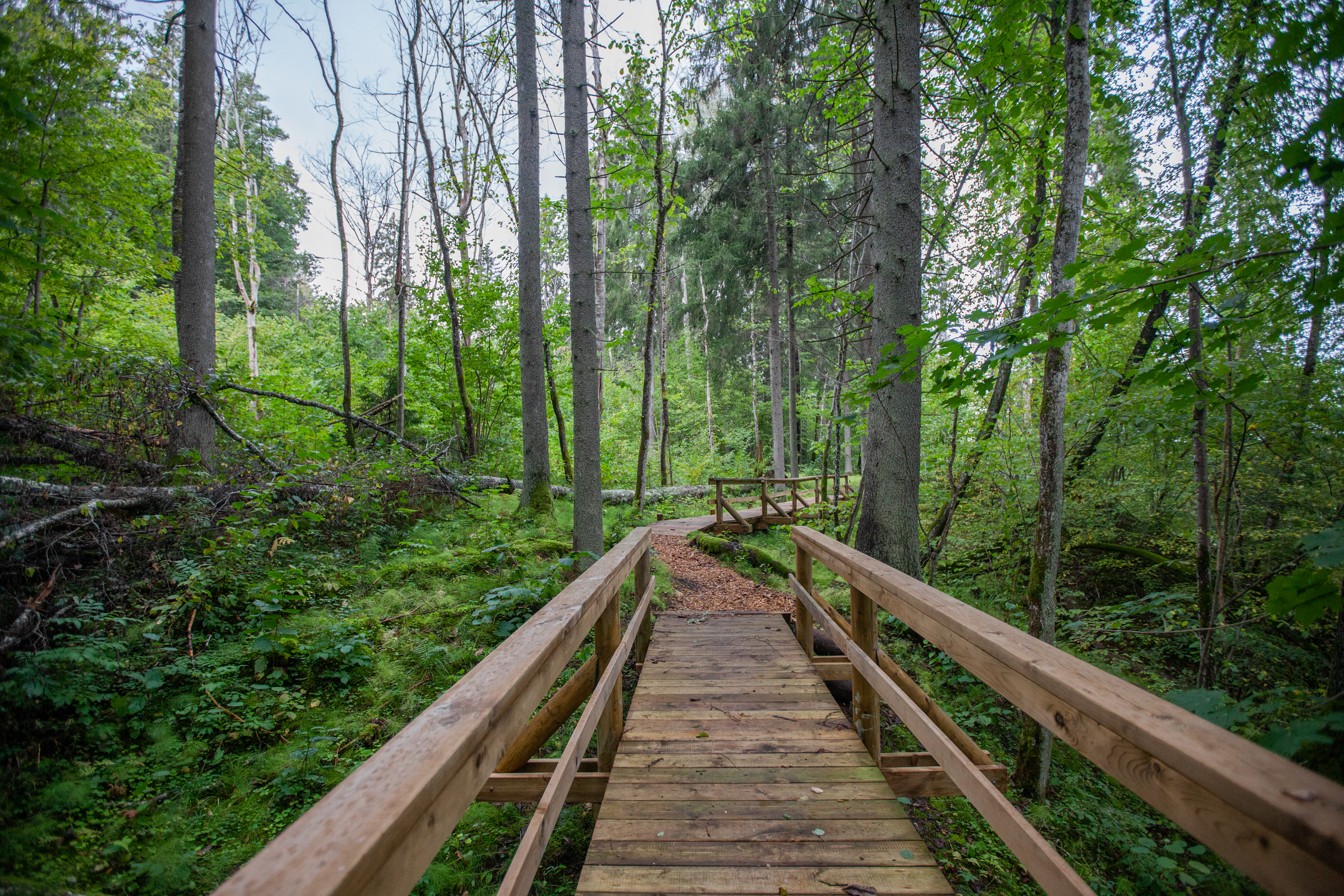
Incukalns Hunting trail, day 3

The city of Riga is surrounded by forests, which means that if you begin your hike in the heart of the city, in a couple of hours you will find yourself in a beautiful coniferous forest. The trail leads through a wooded coastal dune area, along Gauja River and along a historical postal road which was once used to travel to neighbouring countries. In early summer, the meadows show a magnificent display of blooming catchflies.

Highlights: Old Riga – UNESCO World heritage site, Freedom Monument and Latvian National Opera House, Riga Central Market – historical aircraft (zeppelin) hangars, The cultural and natural heritage of Vērmane Garden park, Art Nouveau buildings on Tērbatas Street, The Ethnographic Open-Air Museum of Latvia, Riga water supply museum – industrial heritage, Garden of Artists by Anna Ludiņa, Inčukalns Hunting Palace, Hunting trail and Inčukalns Velnala (Devil’s) Cave.

=== Gauja National Park (112 km) ===
Gauja valley – most impressive ancient river valley in Latvia (Rāmkalni - Valmiera, day 4 - 8)

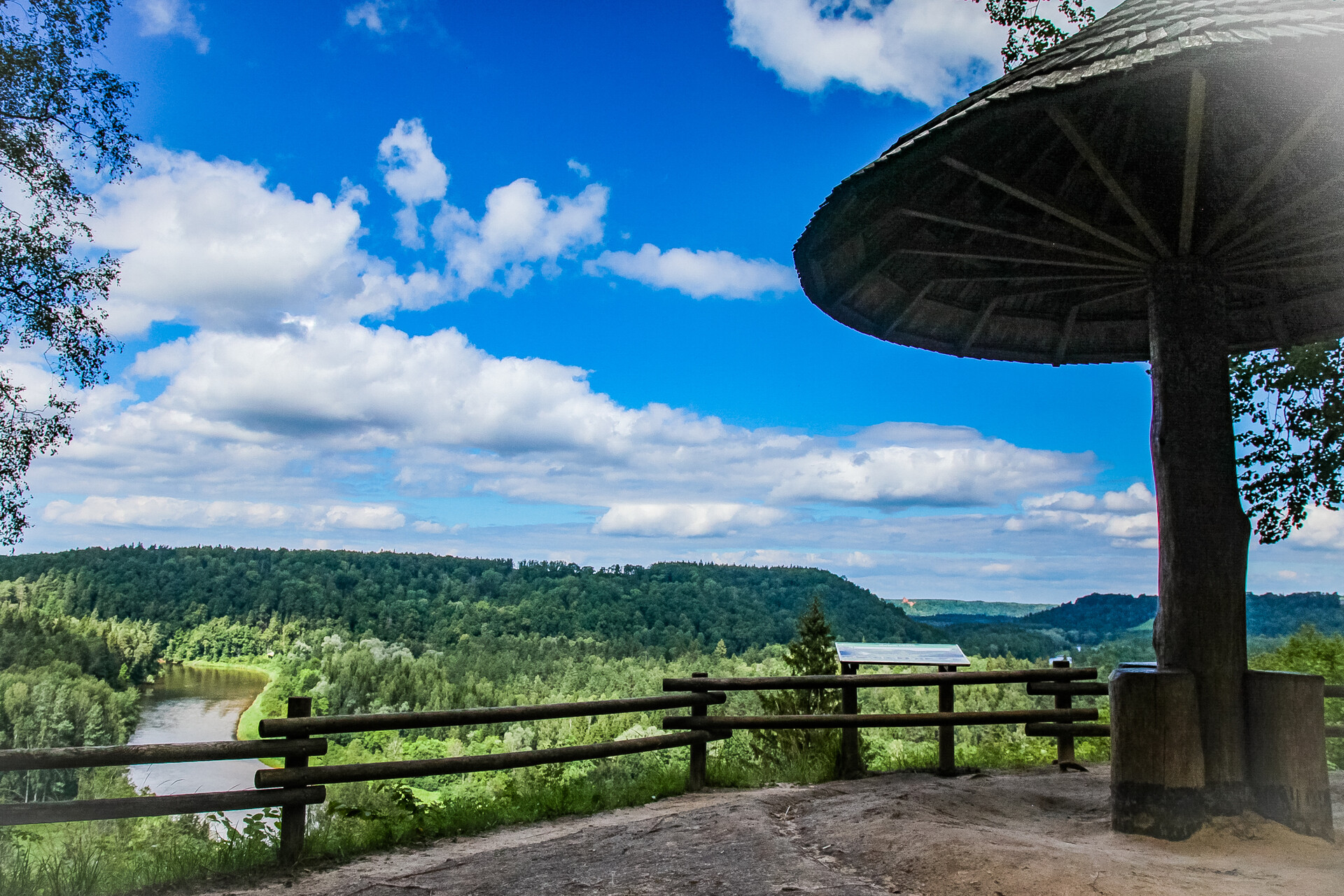
Ķeizarskats, a viewing spot in Sigulda, day 4

For some 100 km, Forest trail stretches through the ancient valley of Gauja River and Gauja National Park. The banks of the Gauja River reveal colourful sandstone outcrops which are reflected in the water. The sights are most wonderful in springtime, when bird cherry trees are in full bloom, and in autumn, as the trees turn red and yellow. The ancient valley of Gauja River has a distinctive terrain relief that can fluctuate up to 80 m. The largest part of the road leads through forest paths, along the river, and exits the woods in Līgatne and Sigulda.

Highlights: The ancient valley of Gauja River – the deepest river valley in the Baltic States, Sigulda – one of the most popular tourist destinations in Latvia, Bobsleigh and Luge Track Sigulda, Sigulda cable car over river Gauja at a height of 43 m, Medieval castles of Sigulda, Krimulda, Turaida and Cēsis, Gūtmaņala Cave, the largest grotto in the Baltic States, Līgatne Nature Trails offer a chance to observe local wildlife and birds, Līgatne Paper Mill Village – industrial heritage, Secret Soviet Bunker in Skaļupes, Medieval Old Town of Cēsis, Devil’s Cave cliff, Kūķu Rock, Zvārtes Rock, Ērģeļu Cliffs and Sietiņiezis – the most impressive Devonian sandstone outcrops in Latvia, Valmiera – northern gateway to the Gauja National Park.

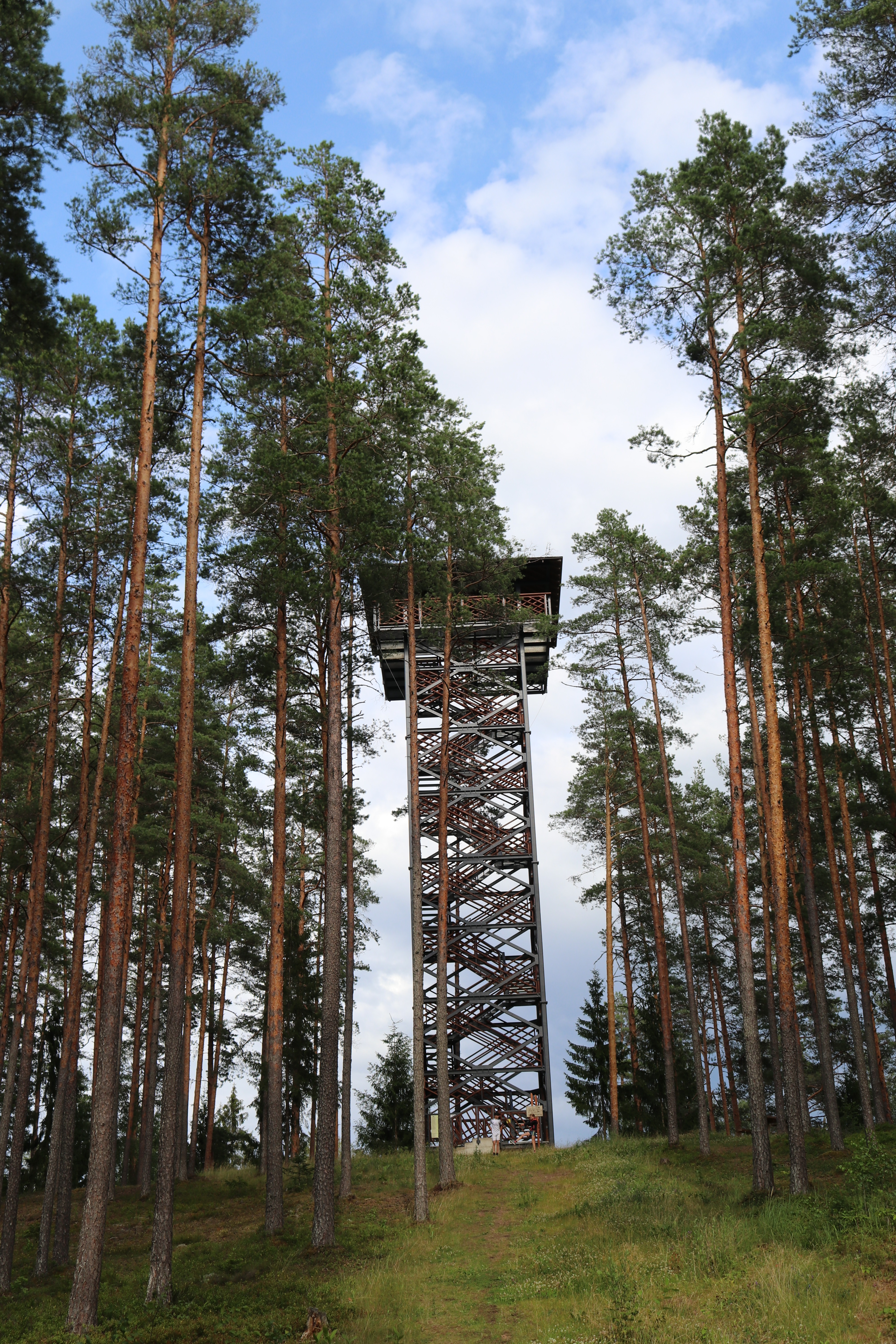
Cirgaļi observation tower, day 11

=== Northern Gauja Forestland (123 km) ===
Most untouched forest region of Vidzeme (Valmiera - Trapene, day 9 - 13)

One of the least populated and most densely forested areas on Forest trail is the Northern Gauja Forestland. The forests are abundant in mushrooms and berries, birds and wild animals. Here Gauja, the longest river in Latvia, curves along inland dune ranges, which are covered in scarce, transparent pine forests. The land is covered in white reindeer moss. The peaks of the hills shows its river bends, meadows, and oak trees.

Highlights: Park of Senses on the bluffs of the Gauja River – trail in the trees and barefoot trail in Valmiera city, The bridge over the Gauja River next to Strenči, Strenči – a town with ancient rafter traditions, Seda – a town built in socialist urban style, featuring classical architecture of Stalin’s era, Cirgaļi inland dunes and a viewing tower, Castle of Zvārtava – a Neogothic castle built in 1881, Trapene larch alley, Kalamecu - Markūzu ravines – magnificent ravines with waterfalls and a cave-like niche.

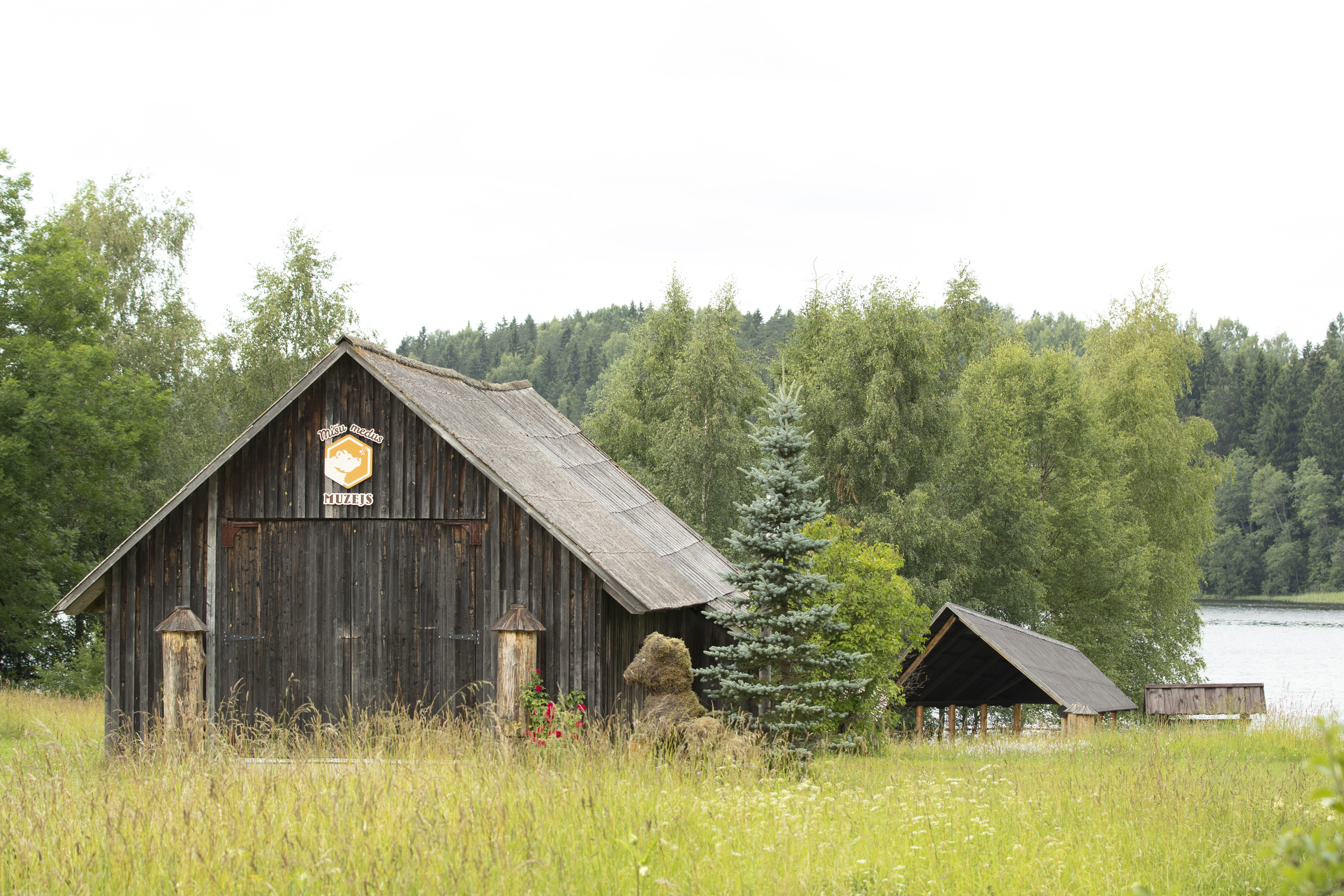
Mišu honey museum, day 15

=== Veclaicene Forestland (44 km) ===
Most beautiful North Latvian highlands (Trapene - Korneti, day 14 - 15)

Forest trail stretches over the hillocks of Alūksne. This is one of the most difficult hiking sections, since the area is hilly. There are many glacial ravines and hills featuring panoramic views stretching all the way to Estonia and Munamägi. The highest hills are castle hills with thousands of years of history, which were purposefully selected for their high ground so that any hostile armies could be seen far away. In this section, Forest trail takes a small detour through Paganamaa or Devil’s Land in Estonia, where hikers will find a viewing tower overlooking the picturesque forest lakes. The scenery is most beautiful in spring, when dandelions are in bloom, and in autumn, as leaves turn red.

Highlights: Landscapes of Alūksne hillocks with hills and lakes, Historical centre of Ape – dolomite buildings and cobblestones, Kornetu - Peļļu subglacial bed – one of the most impressive in Latvia, Drusku castle mound and Dzērve hill watchtower, Witches’ Cliffs on the bank of the Vaidava River.

== E11 in Estonia (720 km) ==
The Estonian part of E11 is known as "Metsa matkarada" (“Forest Trail”). It winds through the Haanja Upland, Setomaa (Land of Setos) and along the western shore of Lake of Peipus until it reaches the Gulf of Finland in North Estonia, where it turns westwards. From there, it follows along the North-Estonian coastline and many peninsulas of Lahemaa National Park, until it comes to its end point in Tallinn. The total length of the route in Estonia is 720 km and it is divided into 4 sections: Haanja Upland, Setomaa Region, Peipsimaa Region, North Estonian Coastline. These sections are divided into ~20 km long stages with accommodation and transport options. In wooded areas, the Forest Trail leads along small forest or rural roads and trails, where possible. In order for the Forest Trail to exist as one, uninterrupted route, in some parts it runs along the side of asphalt roads. On the northern shores of Lake Peipus and in some places along the Gulf of Finland, it runs along sandy beaches or stony, rocky and sometimes overgrown shores. In cities and settlement areas, the Forest Trail leads along pedestrian sidewalks or the side of the street.

There are specific markers (white-orange-white) on trees and other objects along the route to help you get your bearings in nature and not lose track of the road. In populated areas, it is marked by stickers on road signs and other objects. On the coast of the Gulf of Finland, from Toila to Tallinn, it can also be marked by white-blue-white markers, but in places where the trail overlaps with the trails developed by the Estonian State Forests (RMK), white-green-white markers will appear. The Forest Trail can be started from any physically available location and it can be hiked in both ways (there are markers in both directions).

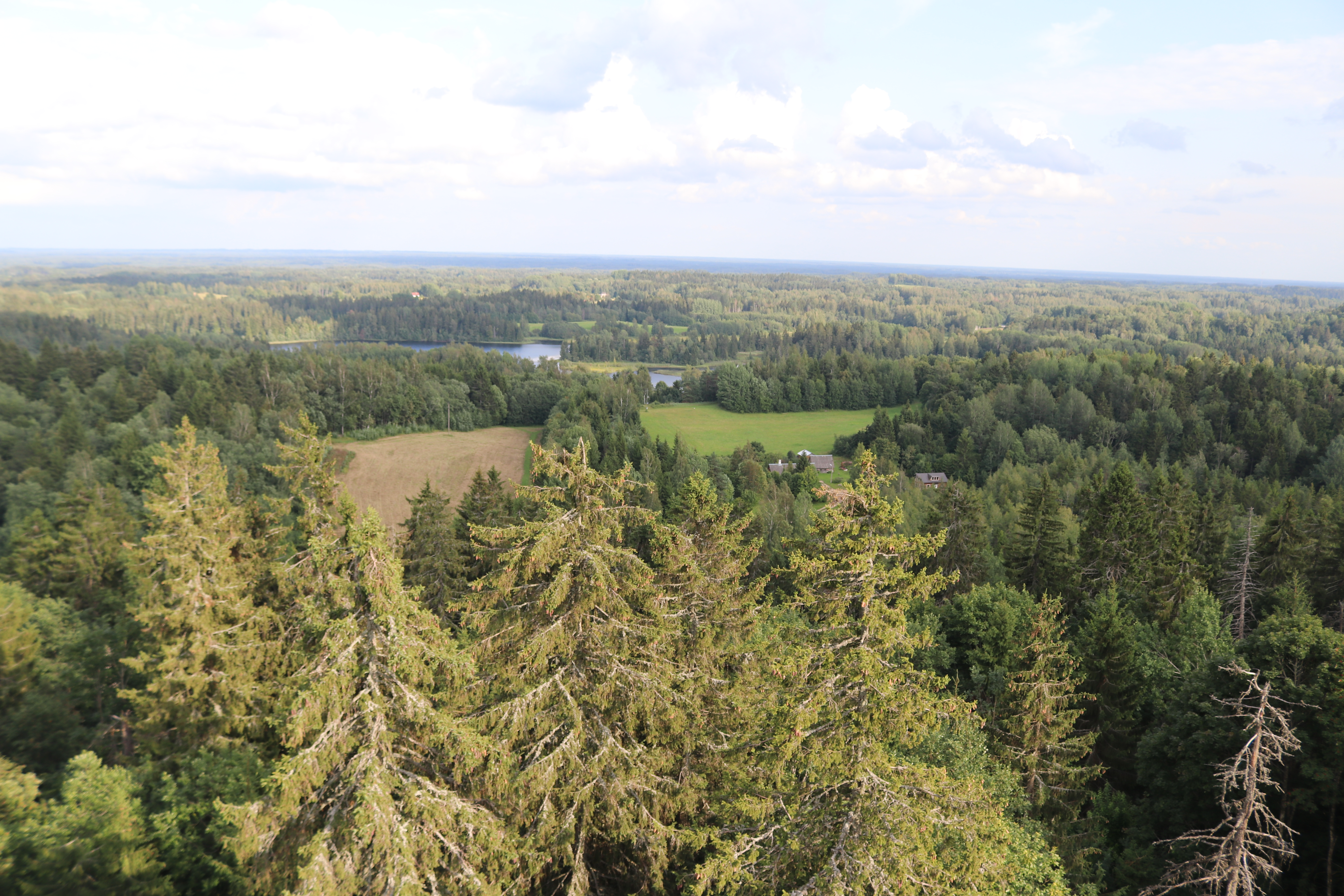
View from observation tower of Suur Munamegi, day 16

=== Haanja Upland (54 km) ===
Suur Munamägi in Haanja Nature Park - the highest peak in the Baltics (Loogamäe - Vana-Vastseliina, day 16 - 18)

The best view of the 50 km wide landscape of Haanja Upland opens from the Suur Munamägi viewing tower. Suur Munamägi reaches 318 m above sea level, and it is the highest peak in the Baltic states. Forest Trail leads through minor rural roads here, along farmsteads. Forests in this region alternate with agricultural land.

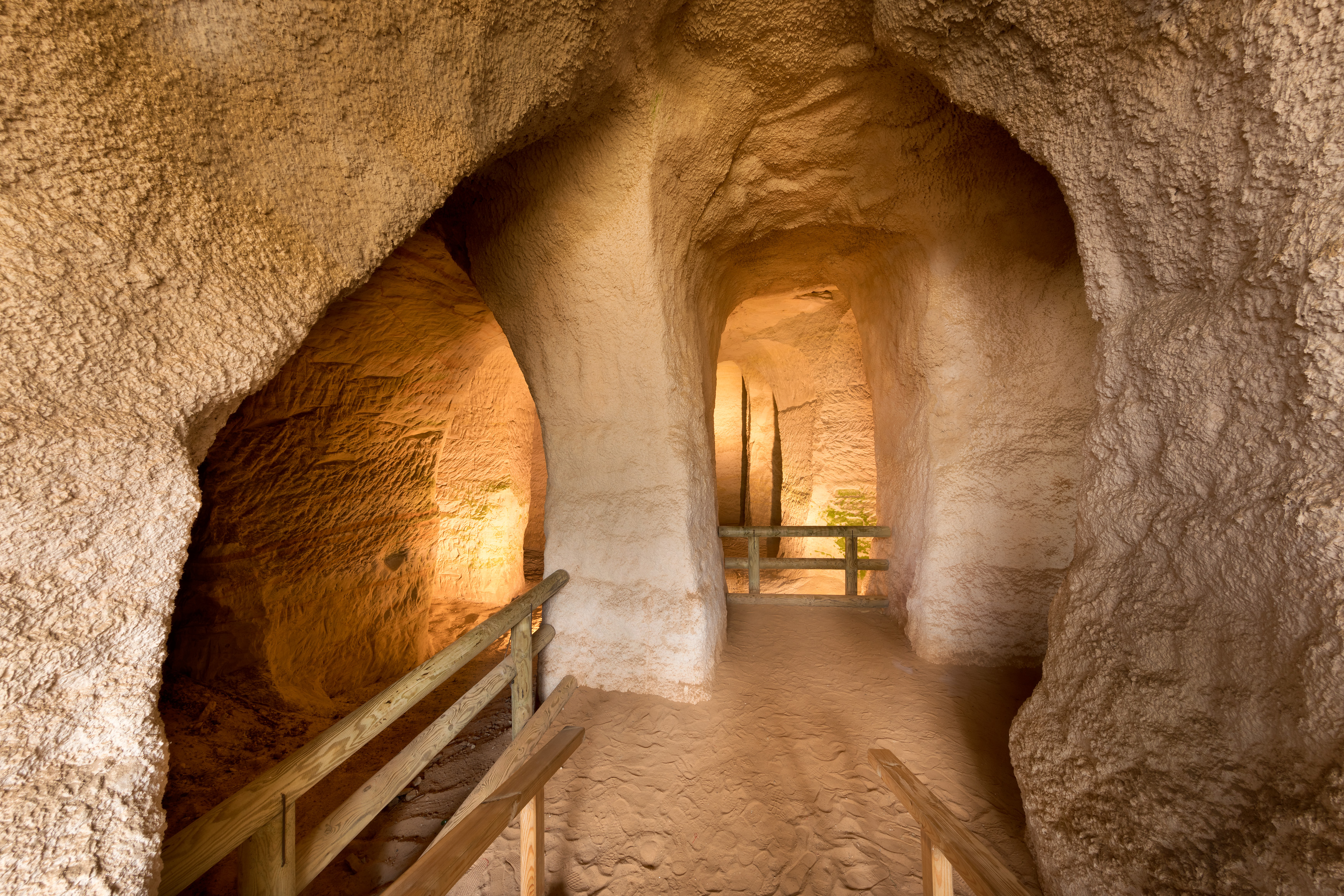
Piusa caves visitor centre, day 19

Highlights: Haanja Nature Park – diverse landscapes and beautiful nature, Suur Munamägi viewing tower, Cafe at the highest peak in the Baltic states, Tradition of smoke sauna – UNESCO intangible cultural heritage, Nopri farm – local dairy producer, Vastseliina Bishop’s Castle Ruins and Pilgrim’s House, National Geographic yellow frames in the villages of Haanja and Vana-Vastseliina.

=== Setomaa Region (73 km) ===
Setomaa – diverse nature combined with authentic culture (Vana-Vastseliina - Ristipalo, day 19 - 21)

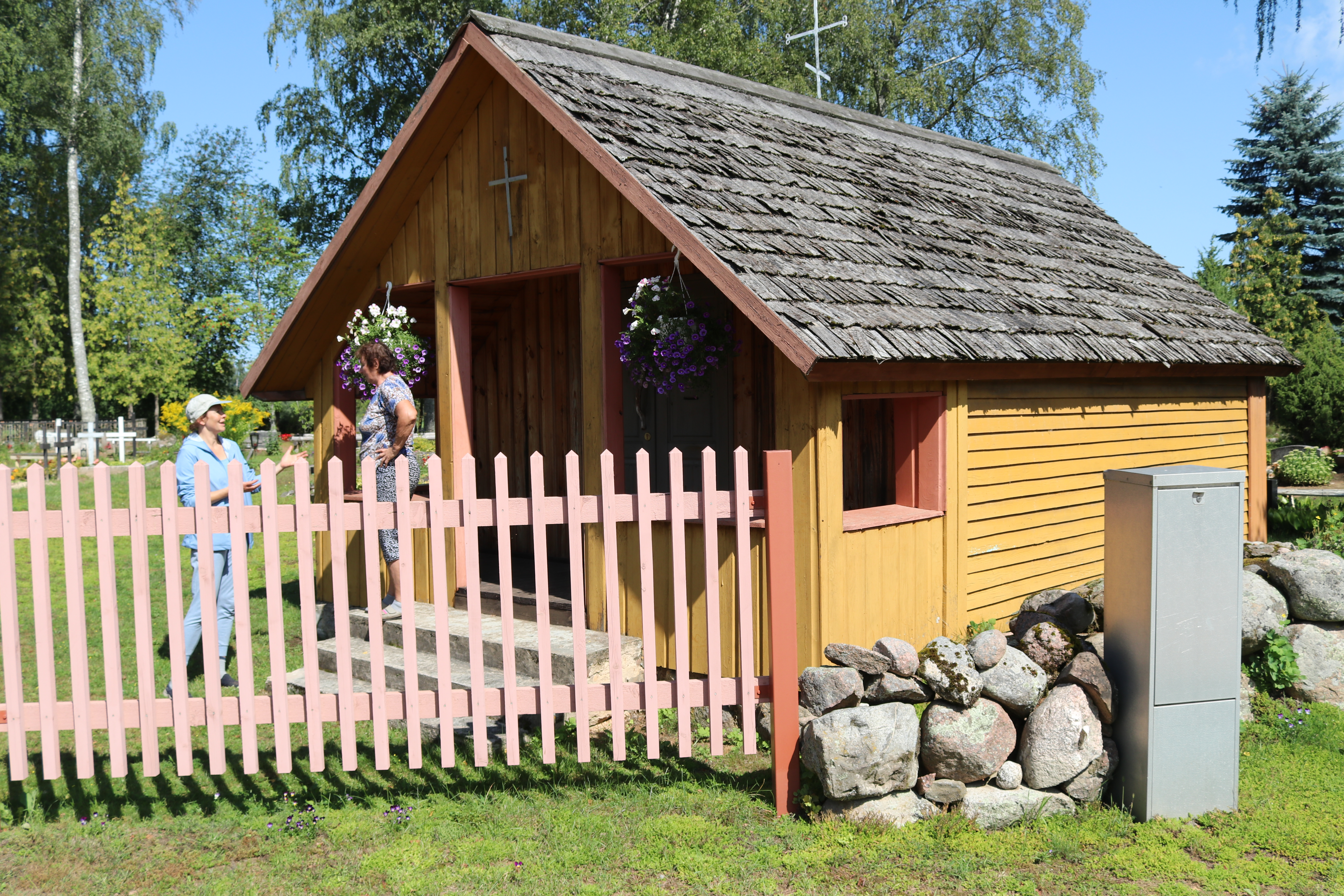
Laossina village capel, day 21

Setomaa or “the Land of Setos” is inhabited by Setos – an ethnographic group with specific ancient traditions and a unique language dialect. Forest Trail hikers can visit the traditional Setos homestead and enjoy Setos cuisine. The forests of the region are especially charming in early autumn, when the ground is coloured lilac by the blooming heather. One of the most beautiful sections of the trail in Setomaa leads along the Piusa River, where the river is surrounded by sandstone outcrops. Located at the Värska Bay, underneath a beautiful pine forest there is Värska resort with its sanatorium and SPA which use the strengths of local nature: mineral water and lake mud. Värska mineral water is well known in Estonian and elsewhere.

Highlights: Unique culture – traditions, architecture, handicrafts, language, cuisine, Seto leelo – Seto traditional polyphonic singing, UNESCO intangible cultural heritage, Forest sites for picking wild mushrooms and berries, Valley of the Piusa River, caves and bats, Härma Walls – Estonia’s highest Devonian sandstone outcrop, Mustoja Landscape Protection Area, Seto museums in Värska, Saatse and Obinitsa, Värska mineral water and healing mud, National Geographic yellow frames in the villages of Obinitsa and Podmotsa.

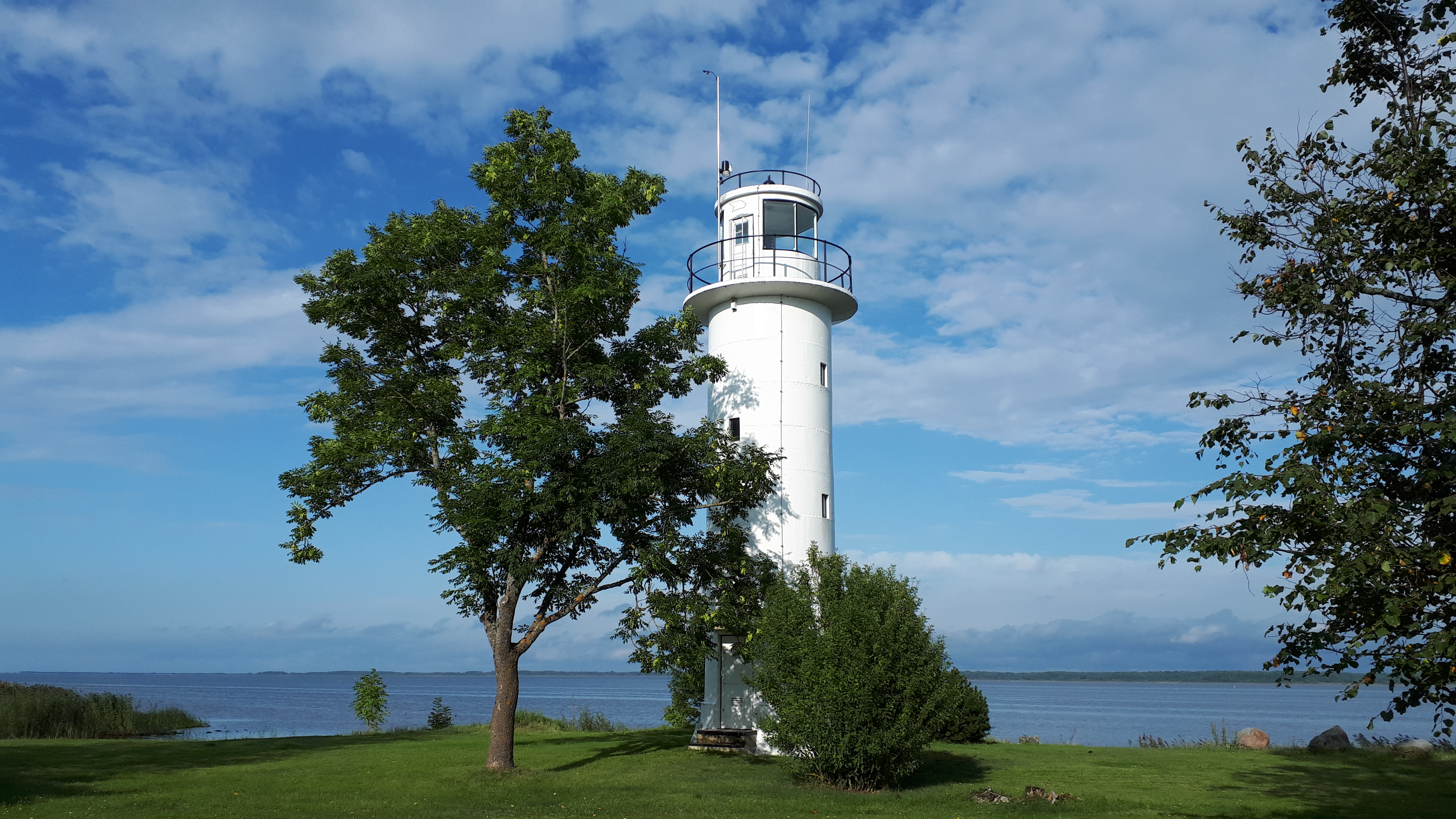
Mehikoorma lighthouse, day 22

=== Peipsimaa Region (255 km) ===
Fishing villages and onion route (Ristipalo – Kuremäe, day 22 – 33)

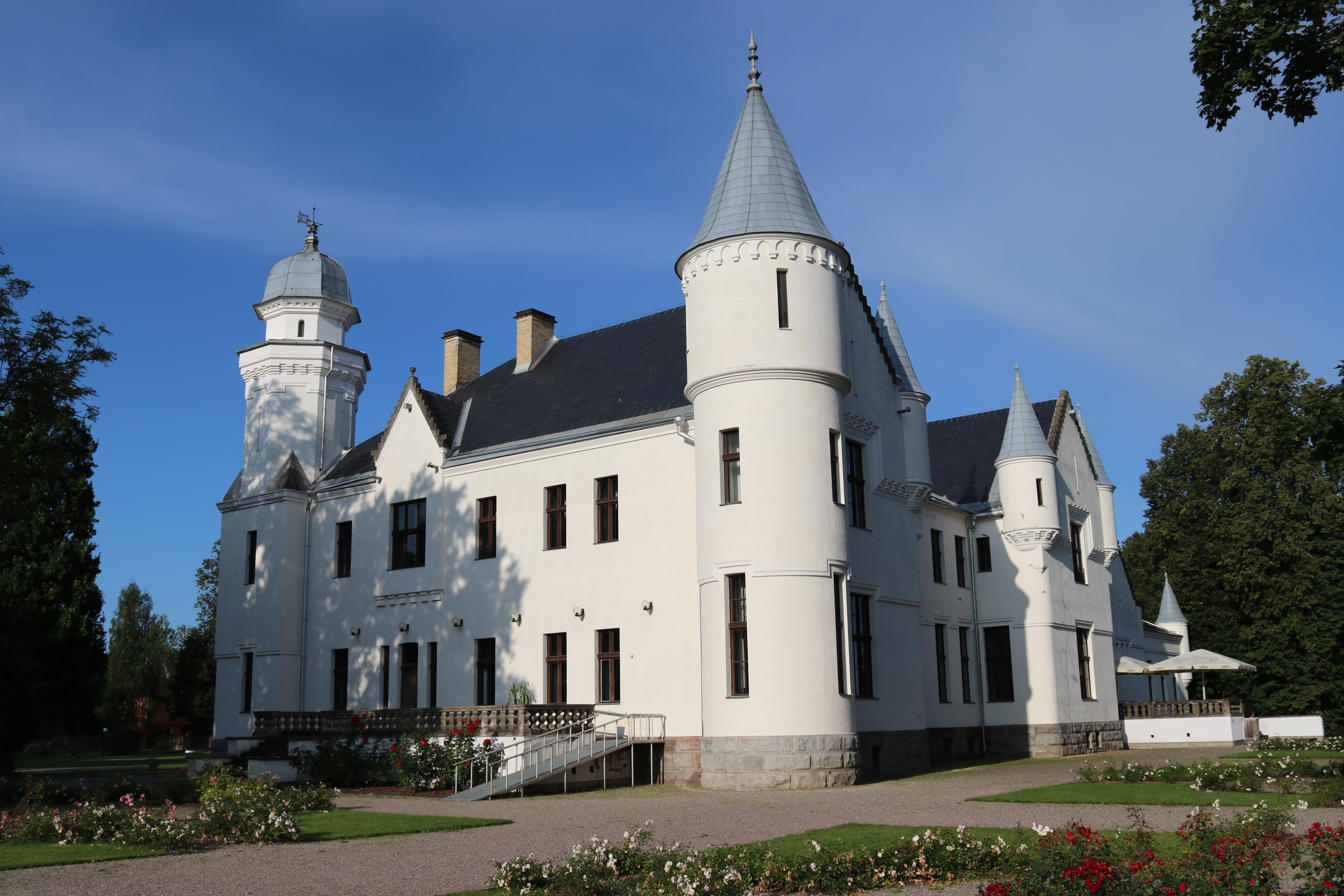
Alatskivi castle, day 26

Lake Peipus is so large that it could be mistaken for sea. Forest trail leads along the shores of the lake, passing through villages that are linked together by long streets. The streets are packed with rows of colourful houses. An influence of Orthodox culture can be sensed in the way these villages are constructed. Since the time of the Russian Emperor Tsar Nicholas, a tradition of growing onions persists in this region, and often people sell strings of home-grown onions on street sides. Visitors can buy fresh fish from Lake Peipus in shops or enjoy delicious meals served in local restaurants. As Forest trail reaches the northern shore of Lake Peipus, the route stretches along a sandy beach for two days.

Highlights: Peipus – the fourth largest lake in Europe, Kavastu Ferry – the only manually powered ferry in the Baltic states, Emajõe wetland with a wooden footpath, Varnja, Kolkja, Kallaste, Mustvee – Old Believers’ villages, where onions are traditionally grown, Fishing traditions and fish restaurants in Lake Peipus area, Alatskivi castle, Kallaste sandstone cliffs, Lake Peipus lighthouses, Avinurme handicraft centre, Sandy beach on the northern shore of Lake Peipus, Alutaguse National Park is one of the most densely wooded and swampy areas in Estonia, Kuremäe Monastery – a popular pilgrimage place.

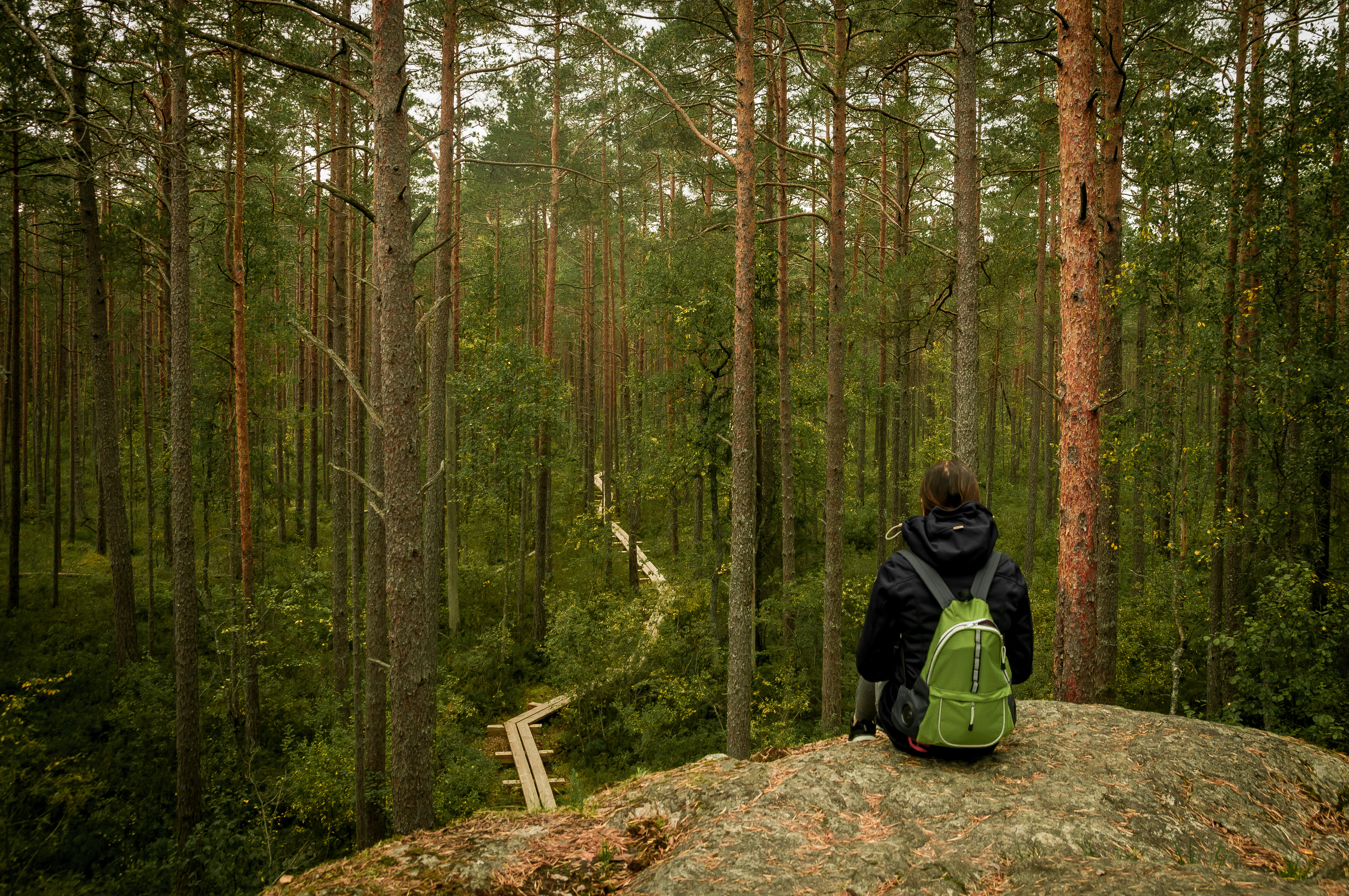
Majakivi boulder, day 45

=== North Estonian Coastline (344 km) ===
Lahemaa National Park, waterfalls, stones and cliff (Kuremäe – Tallinn, day 34 – 50)

In the Northern Estonia section of the route, nature becomes harsher and increasingly Nordic. Here you can see the glacial boulders the size of a house, sparsely populated islands with pristine scenery, as well as waterfalls that are quite wide and tall for the Baltic region. The North Estonian Klint is a long rocky outcrop on the coast of the Baltic Sea. Walking on the shore of the Gulf of Finland a spectacular landscape of both rocky and sandy beaches may be observed. Lahemaa National Park is characterised by many bays, peninsulas, forests and villages of rich cultural heritage. Forest trail passes through the typical Estonian juniper fields and into the suburbs and the centre of Tallinn.

Highlights: The North Estonian Klint - the most impressive outcrop in the Baltics, Waterfalls and the largest boulders of Northern Europe, Industrial heritage in Kunda, Lahemaa – the oldest national park in the Baltic States, Altja – a traditional fishing village, Käsmu – a popular Estonian sea captains´ village, Purrekkari Cape – the northernmost point of the Estonian mainland, Military heritage – coastal fortifications, Pirita – the most popular resort and Olympic centre in Tallinn, Old Town of Tallinn – UNESCO heritage site.
