= Alatskivi Parish =

Former municipality of Estonia

Alatskivi Parish Alatskivi vald
- Municipality
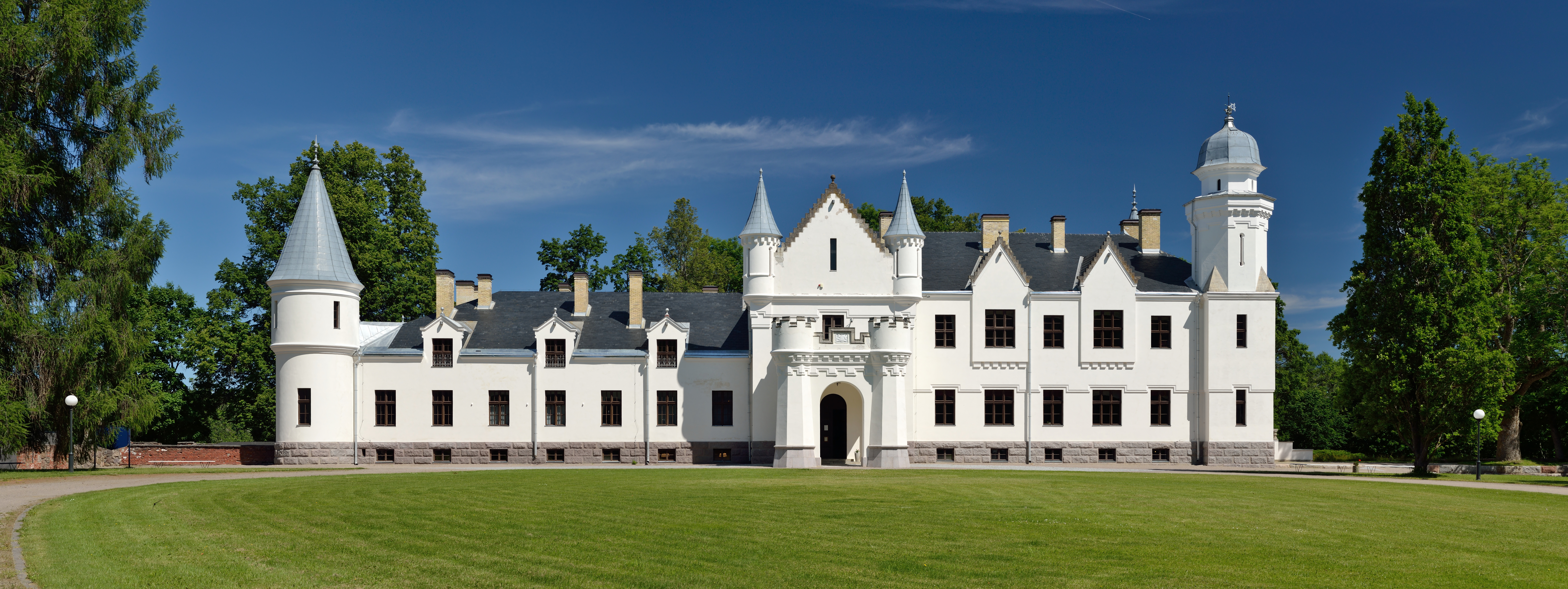
- Alatskivi Castle

- Flag Coat of arms

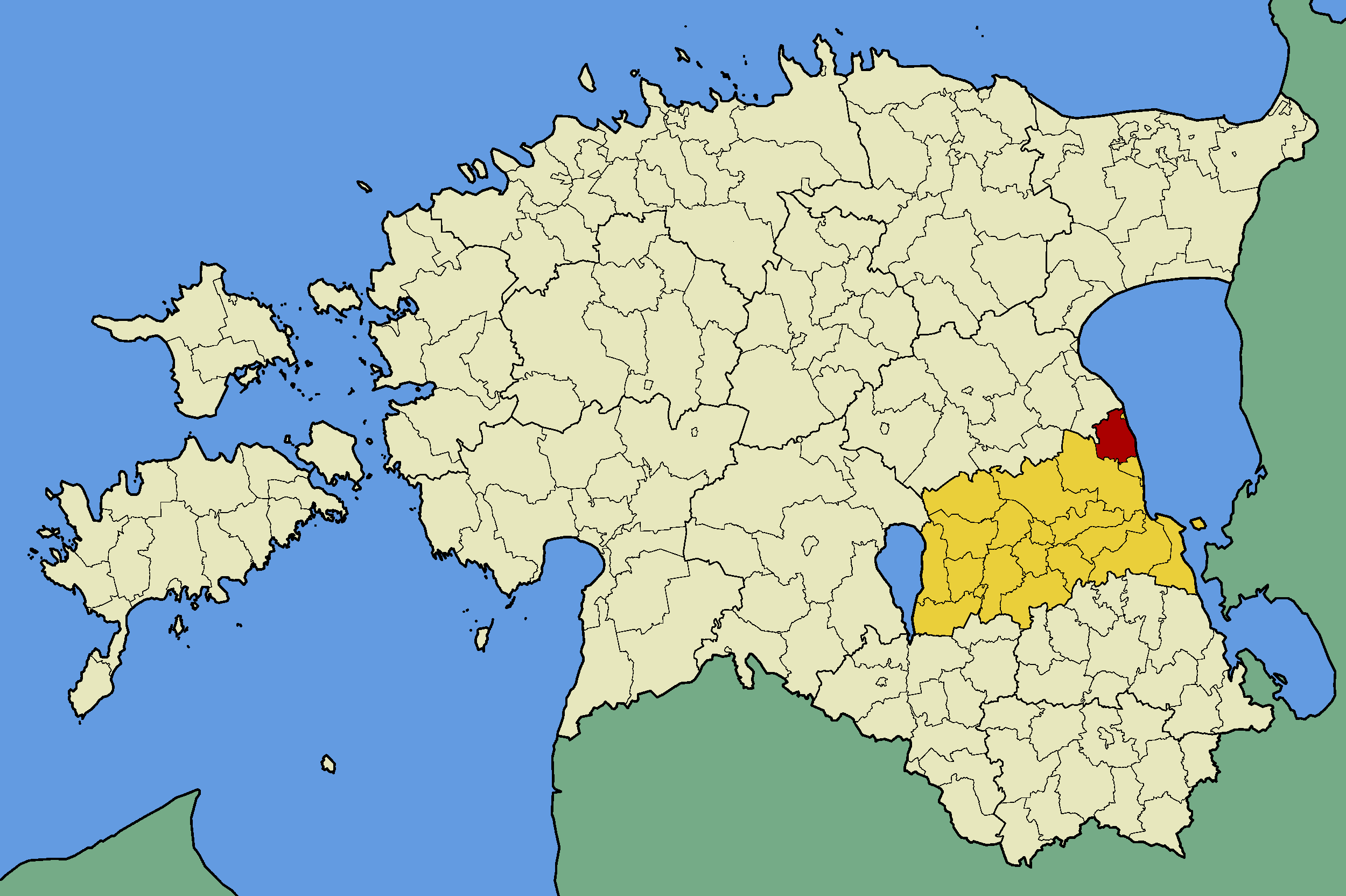
- Alatskivi Parish within Tartu County.
- Country: Estonia
- County: Tartu County
- Administrative centre: Alatskivi
- Website: www.alatskivi.ee

Alatskivi Parish was a rural municipality in Tartu County, Estonia.

== Settlements ==
Small borough
Alatskivi

Villages
Alasoo
Haapsipea
Kesklahe
Kõdesi
Kokora
Kuningvere
Lahe
Lahepera
Linaleo
Naelavere
Nina
Orgemäe
Padakõrve
Päiksi
Passi
Peatskivi
Pusi
Pärsikivi
Riidma
Ronisoo
Rootsiküla
Rupsi
Saburi
Savastvere
Savimetsa
Sudemäe
Torila
Toruküla
Tõruvere
Väljaküla
Virtsu

== International relations ==
=== Twin towns — sister cities ===
Alatskivi Parish was twinned with:

- Kävlinge Municipality, Sweden
- Muurame Municipality, Finland

== See also ==
- Alatskivi Castle
