= Vara Parish =

Former municipality of Estonia

Coordinates: 58°31′N 26°53′E

Vara Parish Vara vald
- Former municipality of Estonia
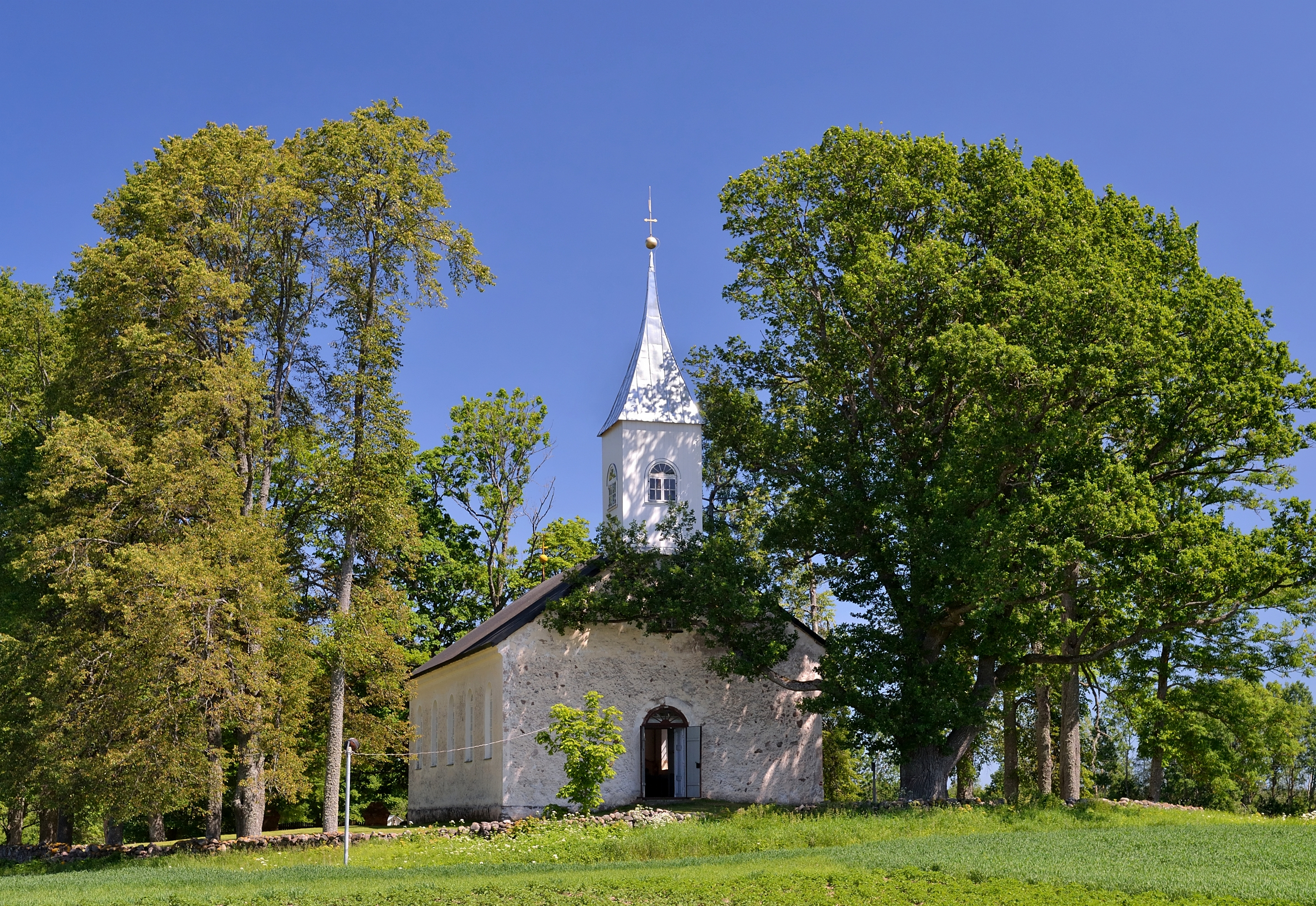
- Vara church

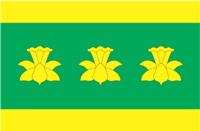
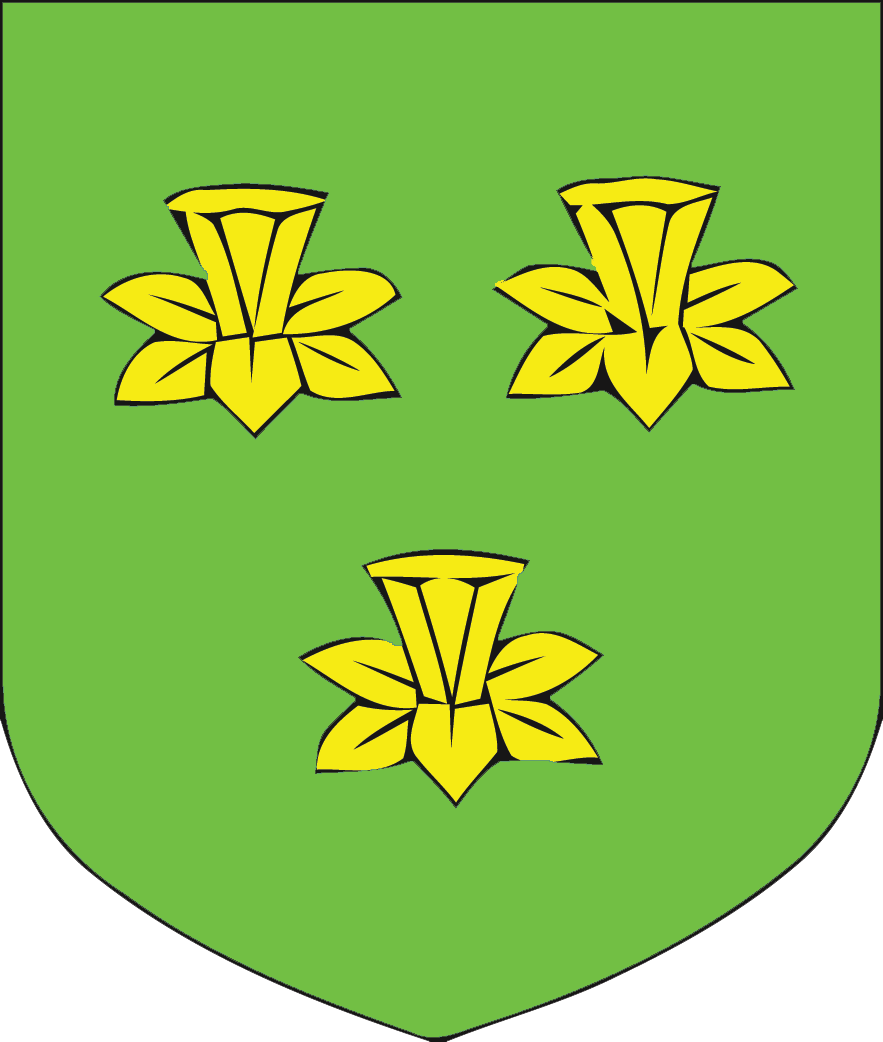
- Flag Coat of arms

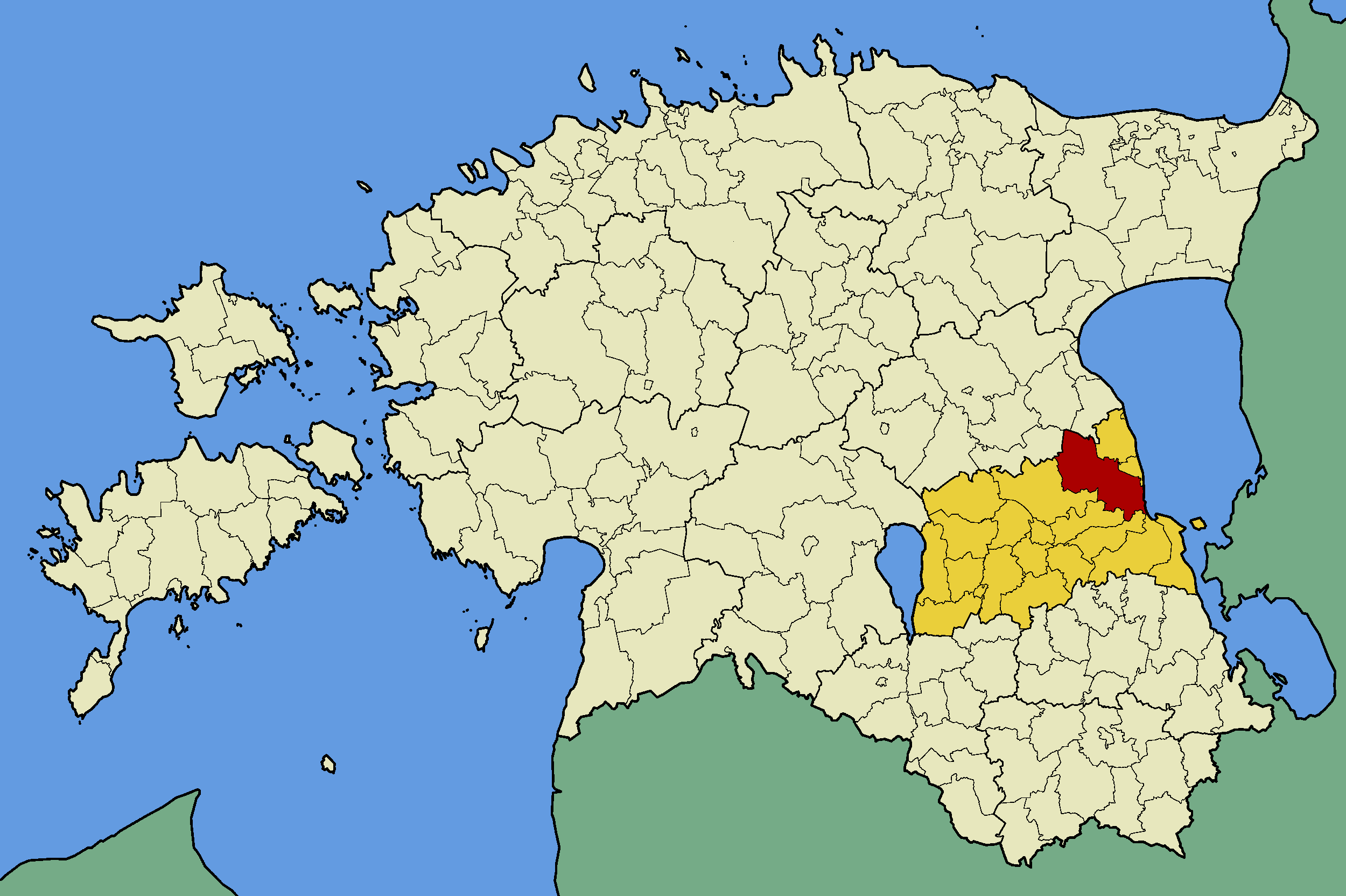
- Vara Parish within Tartu County.
- Country: Estonia
- County: Tartu County
- Administrative centre: Vara
- Website: www.varavald.ee

Vara Parish was a rural municipality in Tartu County, Estonia.

== Settlements ==
Villages

Alajõe - Ätte - Kargaja - Kauda - Keressaare - Koosa - Koosalaane - Kusma - Kuusiku - Matjama - Meoma - Metsakivi - Mustametsa - Papiaru - Pilpaküla - Põdra - Põldmaa - Põrgu - Praaga - Rehemetsa - Särgla - Selgise - Sookalduse - Tähemaa - Undi - Välgi - Vanaussaia - Vara
