= Pala Parish =

Former municipality of Estonia

Coordinates: 58.667°N 27.022°E

Pala Parish Pala vald
- Former municipality of Estonia
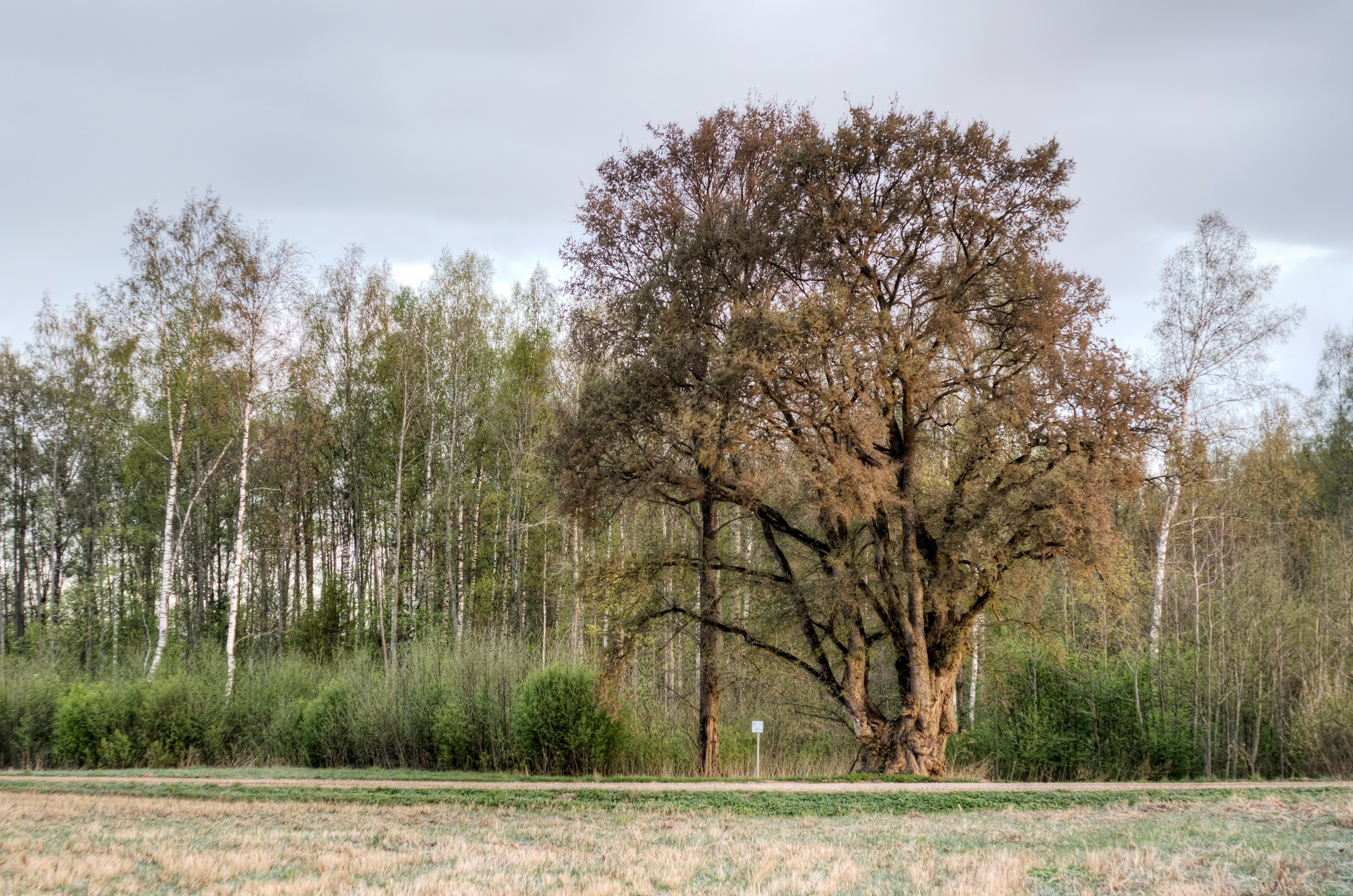
- Lümati elm tree

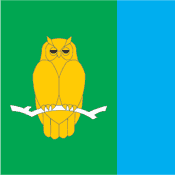
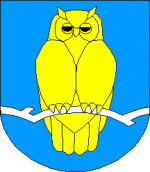
- Flag Coat of arms

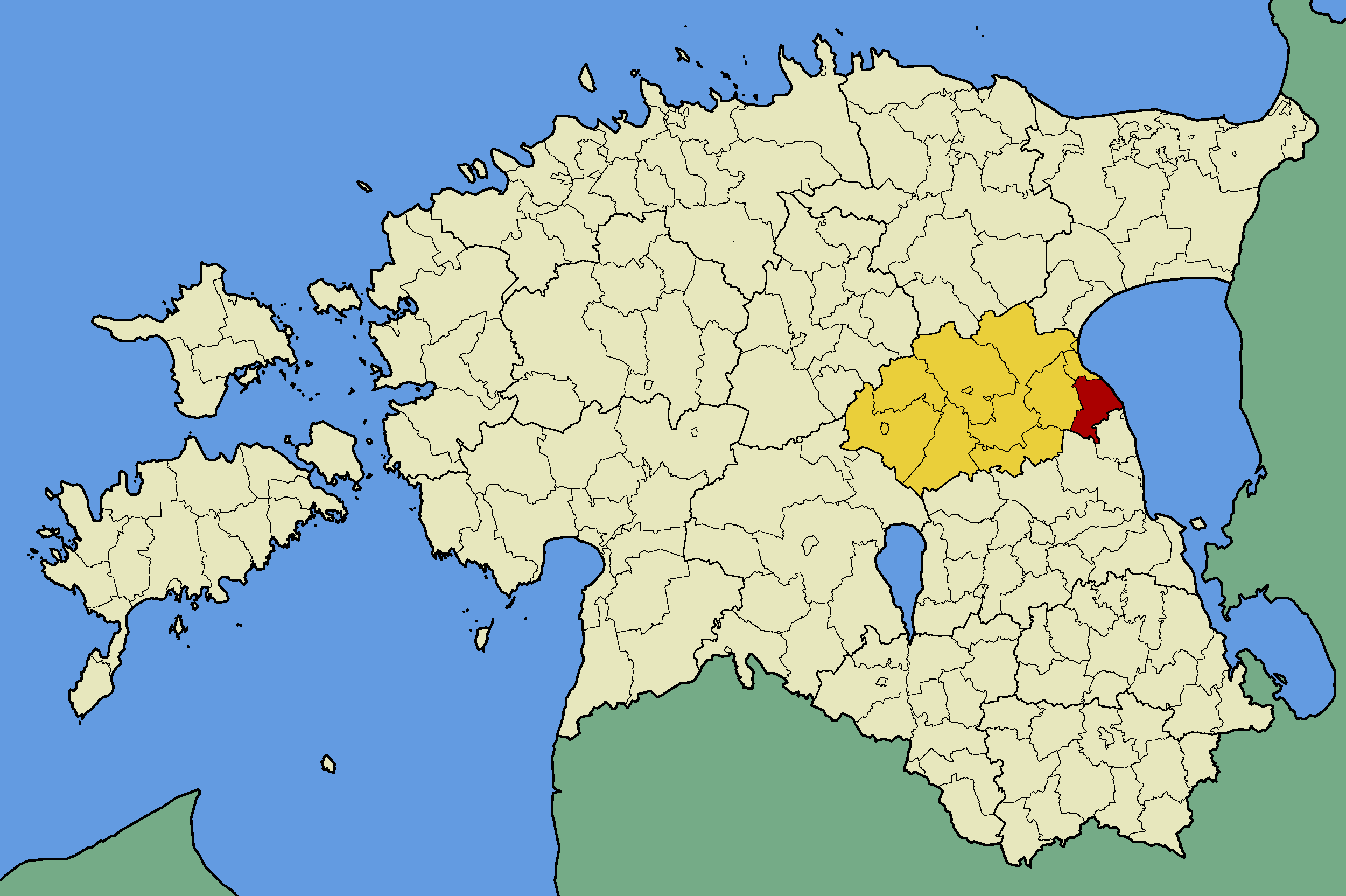
- Pala Parish within Jõgeva County.
- Country: Estonia
- County: Jõgeva County
- Administrative centre: Pala

Area
  - Total: 156.71 km^{2} (60.51 sq mi)

Population (01.01.2004)
  - Total: 1,363
  - Density: 8.698/km^{2} (22.53/sq mi)
- Website: www.pala.ee

Pala Parish (Estonian: Pala vald) is a former rural municipality in eastern Estonia. It was a part of Jõgeva County. The municipality had a population of 1,363 (as of 1 January 2004) and covered an area of 156.71 km². The population density was 8.7 inhabitants per km². There was a total of 23 villages in Pala Parish.

Administrative centre of the municipality was Pala with population of 276. It was first mentioned in 1582 as Pallawes. There are a school, a musical school, a library and a cultural centre in Pala village. Pala Parish is also described as being in a better overall condition then other parishes around the area.

== Settlements ==
Villages

Assikvere - Äteniidi - Haavakivi - Kadrina - Kirtsi - Kodavere - Kokanurga - Lümati - Metsanurga - Moku - Nõva - Pala - Perametsa - Piibumäe - Piirivarbe - Punikvere - Raatvere - Ranna - Sääritsa - Sassukvere - Sõõru - Tagumaa - Vea
