= Välgi Nature Reserve =

Protected area in Estonia

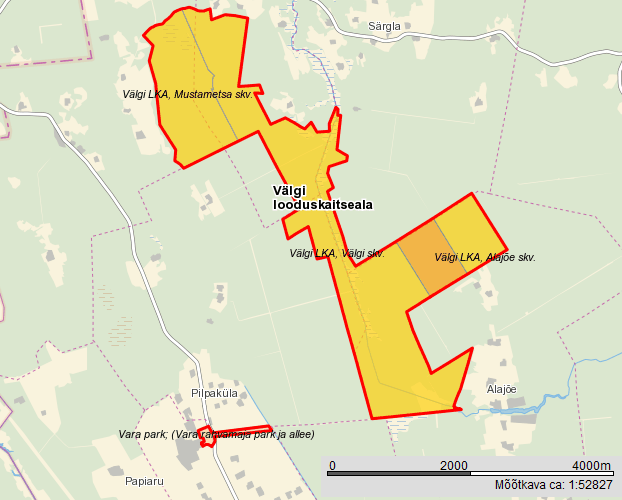

- Location within Estonia
- Location: Estonia
- Coordinates: 58°33′30″N 26°54′00″E
- Area: 762 ha (1,880 acres)
- Established: 2006

Välgi Nature Reserve is a nature reserve which is located in Tartu County, Estonia.

The area of the nature reserve is 762 ha.

This nature reserve was founded in 2006 to protect valuable habitats and threatened species in the Välgi, Alajõe, Mustametsa, Pilpaküla, and Särgla villages (all in former Vara Parish).
