= Kargaja =

Village in Estonia

- Village
- Location within Estonia
- Coordinates: 58.478888888889°N 27.160555555556°E
- Country: Estonia
- County: Tartu County
- Parish: Peipsiääre Parish
- Time zone: UTC+2 (EET)
  - Summer (DST): UTC+3 (EEST)

Kargaja is a village in Peipsiääre Parish, Tartu County in Estonia.

Karjaga borders Tähemaa, Rehemetsa, Vanaussaia, Koosalaane, and Põdra.

== Trivia ==
In Estonian, "Karjaga" means "with the herd".
