= Peipsiääre Parish =

Municipality of Estonia (2017)

Coordinates: 58°32′44″N 27°12′53″E

Peipsiääre Parish Peipsiääre vald
- Municipality of Estonia
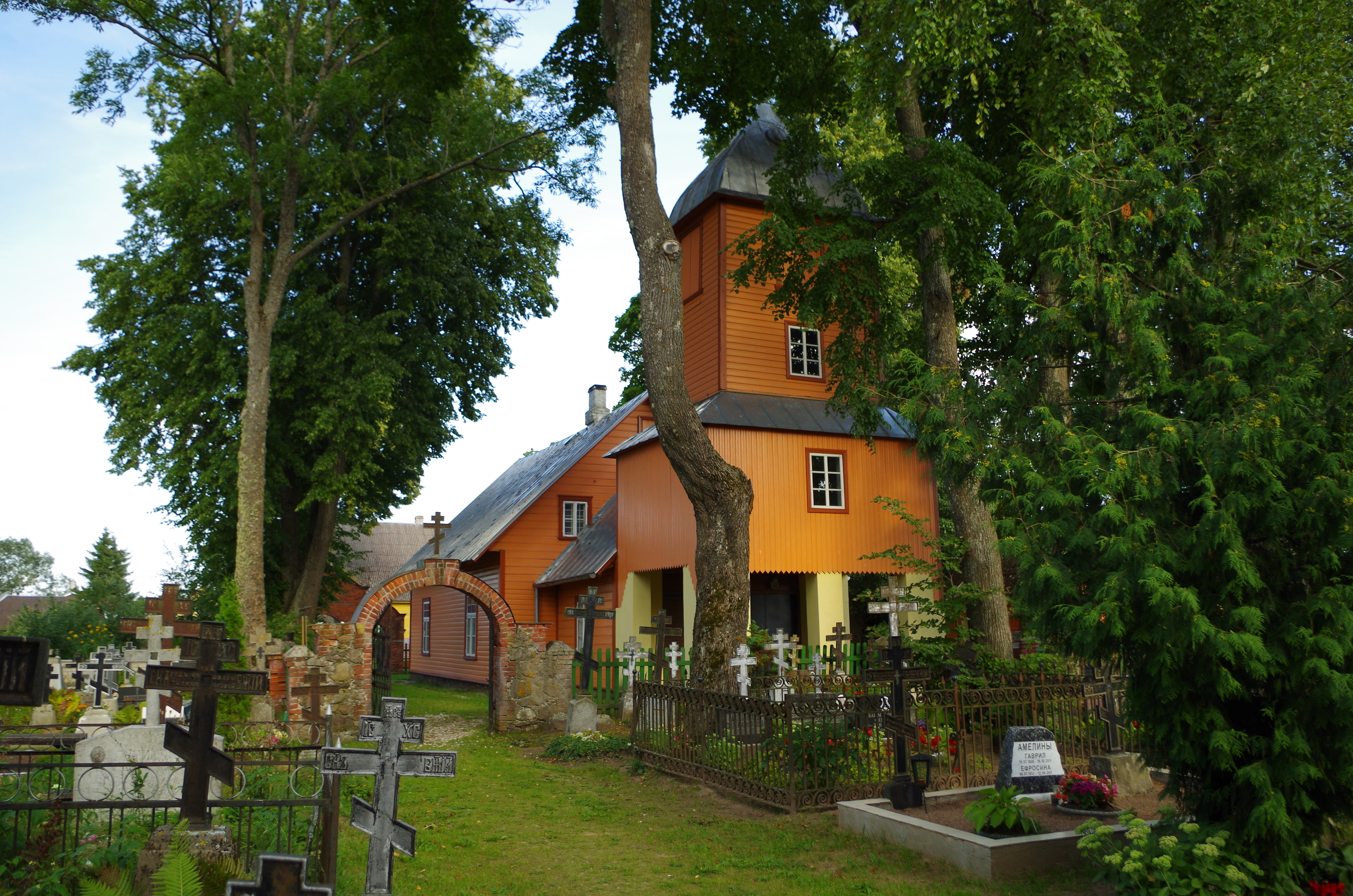
- Kasepää Old-Believers church

- Flag Coat of arms

- Peipsiääre Parish within Tartu County.
- Country: Estonia
- County: Tartu County
- Administrative centre: Alatskivi

Area
  - Total: 652 km^{2} (252 sq mi)

Population (01.01.2020)
  - Total: 5,458
  - Density: 8.37/km^{2} (21.7/sq mi)
- ISO 3166 code: EE-586
- Website: www.peipsiaare.ee

Peipsiääre Parish is a rural municipality located in the Tartu County, Estonia. The municipality of Peipsiäere was formed as a result of the administrative reform on 23 October 2017. Peipsiääre Parish area covers 652 square km and records a population of 5,059 people as of January 1, 2023.

The capital of this municipality is Alatskivi.

== Settlements ==
Town

Kallaste

Small boroughs

Alatskivi - Kasepää - Kolkja - Varnja

Villages

Alajõe - Alasoo - Assikvere - Äteniidi - Ätte - Haapsipea - Haavakivi - Kadrina - Kargaja - Kauda - Keressaare - Kesklahe - Kirtsi - Kodavere - Kõdesi - Kokanurga - Kokora - Koosa - Koosalaane - Kuningvere - Kusma - Kuusiku - Lahe - Lahepera - Linaleo - Lümati - Matjama - Meoma - Metsakivi - Metsanurga - Moku - Mustametsa - Naelavere - Nina - Nõva - Orgemäe - Padakõrve - Päiksi - Pala - Papiaru - Passi - Peatskivi - Perametsa - Piibumäe - Piirivarbe - Pilpaküla - Põdra - Põldmaa - Põrgu - Praaga - Punikvere - Pusi - Raatvere - Ranna - Rehemetsa - Riidma - Ronisoo - Rootsiküla - Rupsi - Sääritsa - Saburi - Särgla - Sassukvere - Savastvere - Savimetsa - Savka - Selgise - Sipelga - Sookalduse - Sõõru - Sudemäe - Tagumaa - Tähemaa - Tedreküla - Torila - Toruküla - Tõruvere - Undi - Välgi - Väljaküla - Vanaussaia - Vara - Vea - Virtsu

== Religion ==
Religion in Peipsiääre Parish (2021)
1. Unaffiliated (64.7%)
2. Orthodox & Old Believers (21.0%)
3. Lutheran (11.7%)
4. Unknown (2.60%)
5. 0.00%
6. 0.00%

== Gallery ==
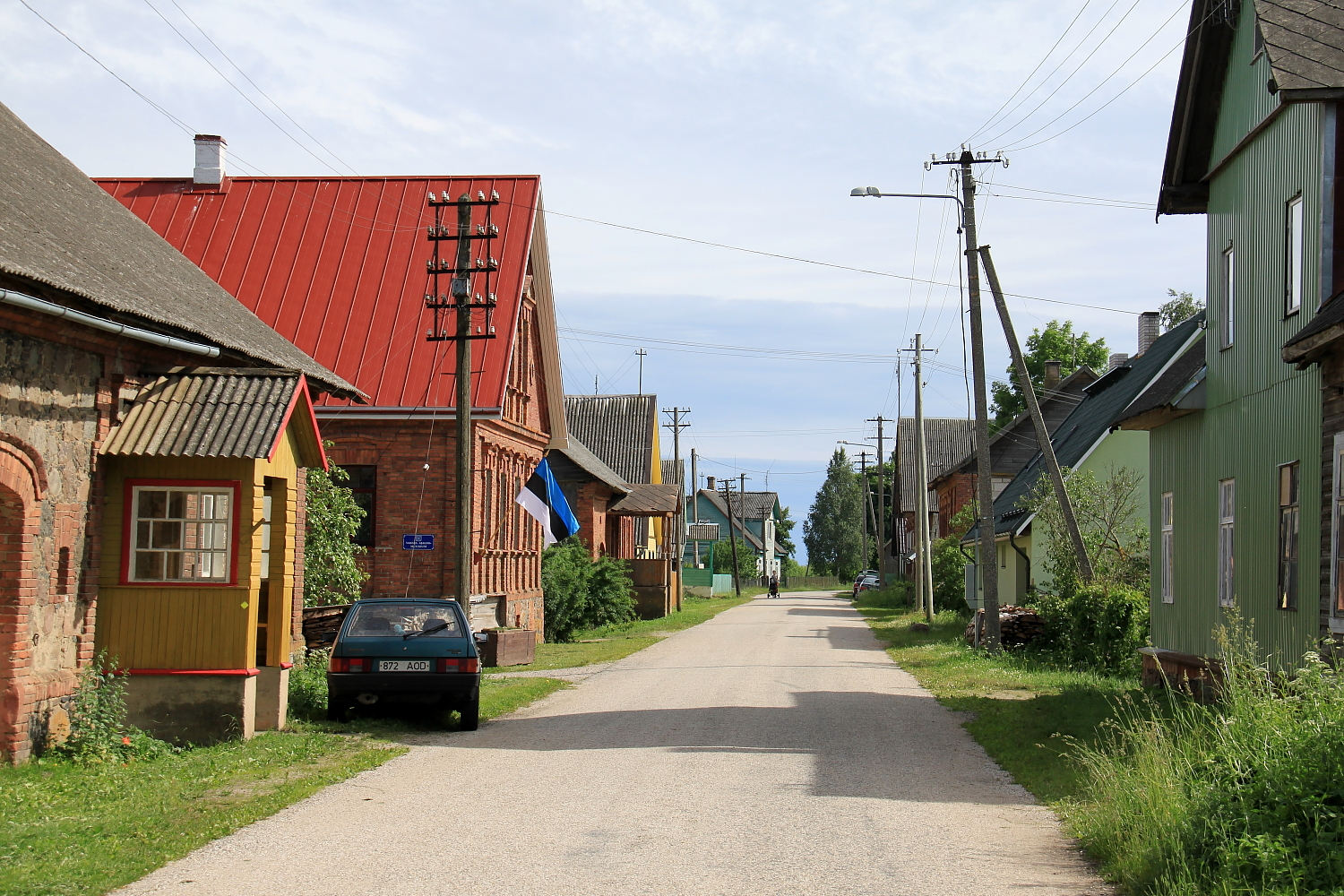
Main street of Varnja

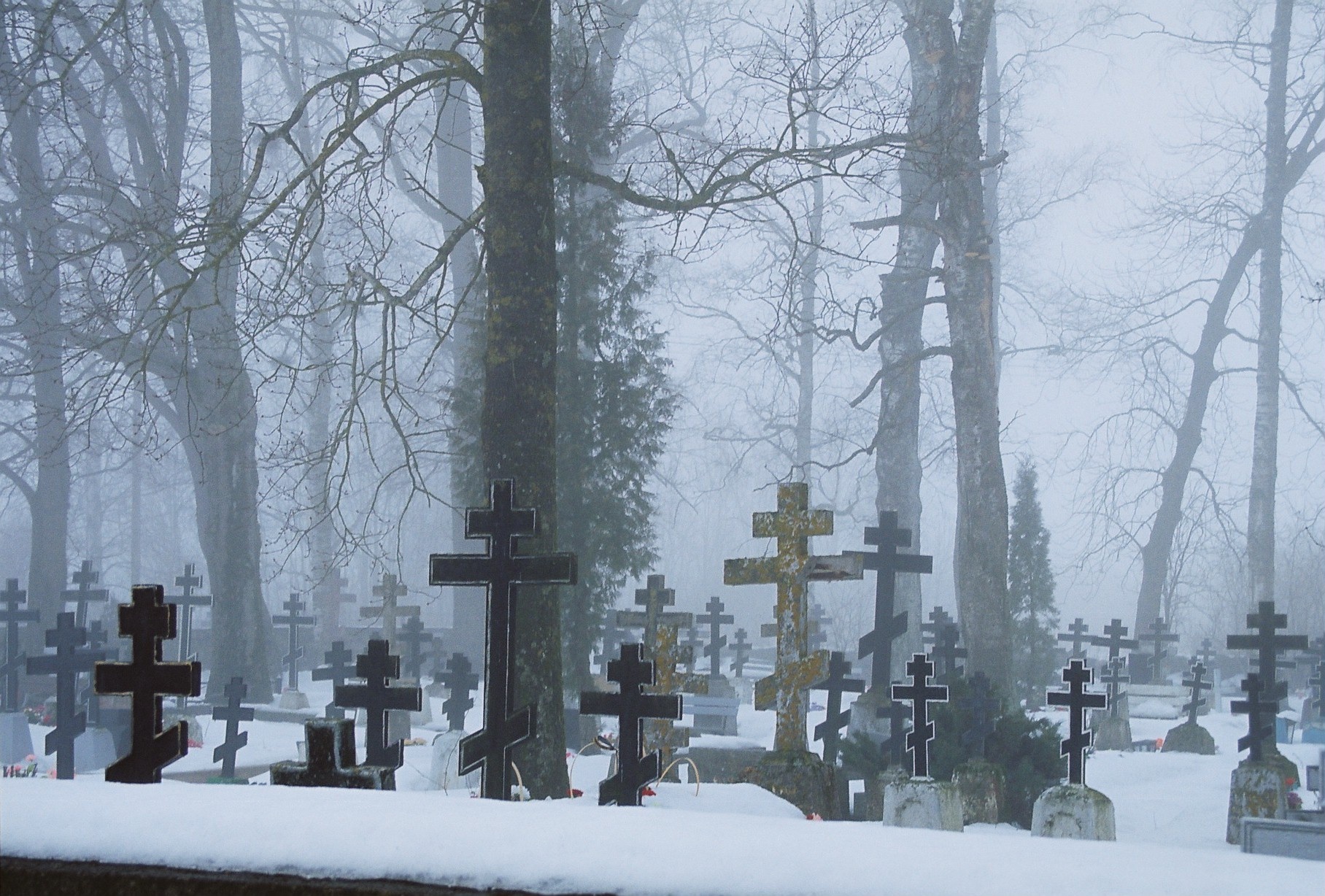
Old Believers' cemetery in Varnja

== Notable people ==
- Anna Haava (1864 in Kodavere Parish – 1957), poet, writer and translator, founding member of the Estonian Writers' Union in 1922.
- Juhan Liiv (1864 in Alatskivi – 1913), a famous poet and prose writer.
- Peeter Baranin (1882 in Kolkja – 1966), politician, early mayor of Mustvee
- Villem Ernits (1891 in Nõva – 1982), linguist, philologist, temperance activist and politician.
- Hugo Villi Kukke (1898 in Pala Parish – 1942), politician and newspaper editor; Minister of Education and Social Affairs, 1932 to 1933
- Eduard Tubin (1905 in Torila – 1982), composer, conductor and choreographer; used folk music
- Arthur Võõbus (1909 in Matjama – 1988), theologian, orientalist, scholar, author, professor and church historian.
- Harald Tammur (1917 in Varnja - 2001), Lutheran clergyman, pastor at Nõo, Rannu, Elva, Tartu, and Kambja; provost of Tartu.
- Väino Aren (1933 in Pala – 2023), ballet dancer, actor, and operetta singer.
- Ants Pärna (1935 in Alatskivi – 2014), maritime historian and poet, head of the Estonian Maritime Museum, 1961 to 1998
- Maido Pajo (born 1950 in Kallaste Raion), politician and lawyer; deputy Minister of Regional Affairs and Agriculture, 1990 to 1992
