= Põdra =

Põdra may refer to several places in Estonia:

- Põdra, Tartu County, village in Estonia
- Põdra, Võru County, village in Estonia
