= Pilpaküla =

Pilpaküla may refer to several places in Estonia:

- Pilpaküla, Hiiu County, village in Pühalepa Parish, Hiiu County
- Pilpaküla, Tartu County, village in Vara Parish, Tartu County
