= Rootsiküla =

Rootsiküla may refer to several places in Estonia:

- Rootsiküla, Pärnu County, village in Kihnu Parish, Pärnu County
- Rootsiküla, Saare County, village in Kihelkonna Parish, Saare County
- Rootsiküla, Tartu County, village in Alatskivi Parish, Tartu County
