= Ants Pärna =

Estonian maritime historian and poet

Ants Pärna (16 August 1935 Alatskivi Parish – 31 December 2014 Tallinn) was an Estonian maritime historian and poet.

In 1969 he graduated from the University of Tartu with a degree in history.

From 1961 until 1998, he was the head of Estonian Maritime Museum.

== Poetry collections ==
- "Poeem laevast "Estonia"" Tallinn, 1999
- "Mu meri" Tallinn, 2001
- "Mu arm". Tallinn, 2002
- "Mu aeg" Tallinn, 2003
- "Mu mõte" Tallinn, 2004
- "Mu tunne". Tallinn, 2006
- "Mu laev". Tallinn, 2007
