= Kasepää =

Borough in Estonia

- Small borough
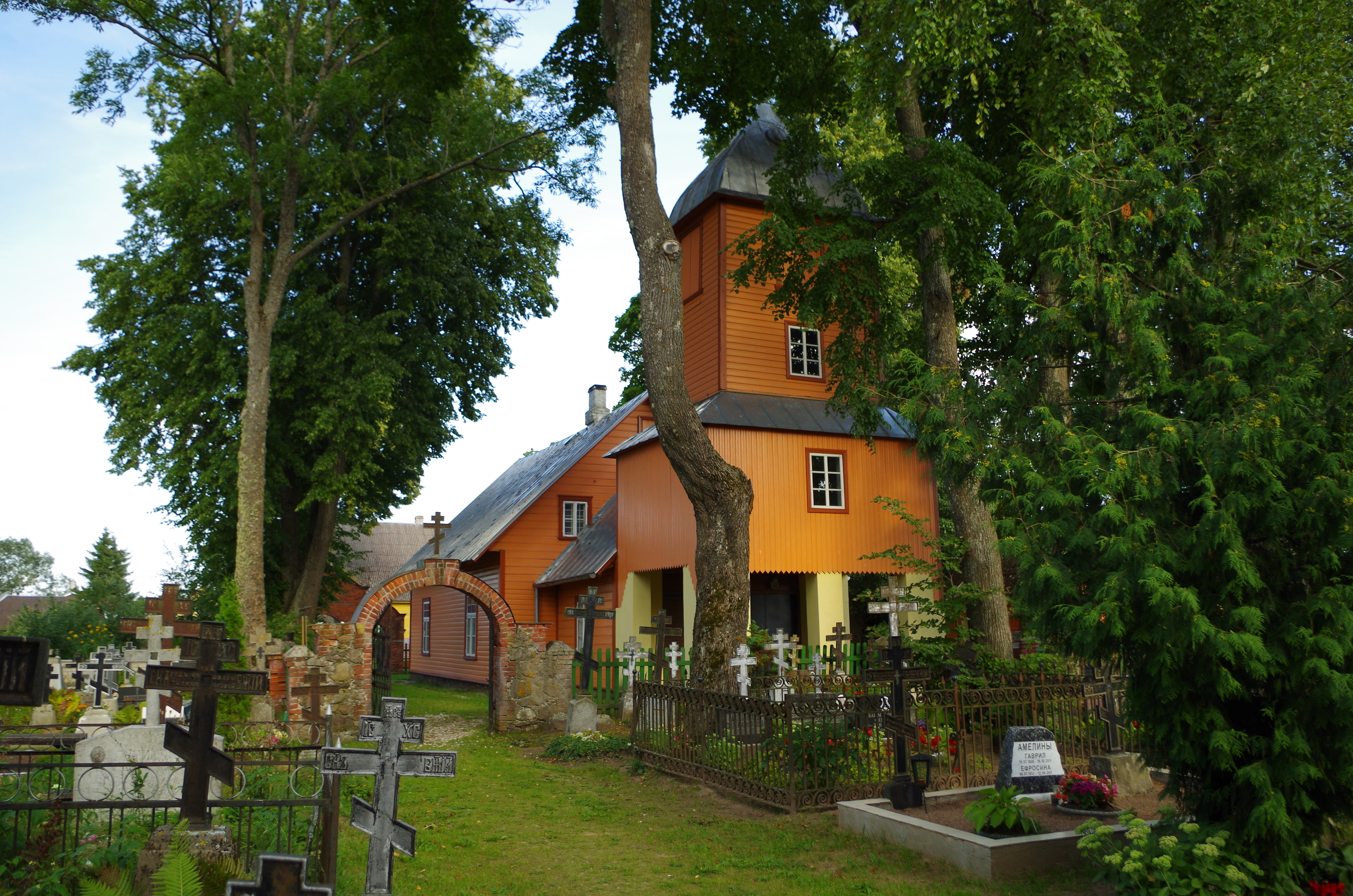
- Kasepää Old-Believers church

- Location in Estonia
- Coordinates: 58°31′30″N 27°14′03″E
- Country: Estonia
- County: Tartu County
- Municipality: Peipsiääre Parish

Kasepää is a small borough (Estonian: alevik) in Peipsiääre Parish, Tartu County, Estonia. The population was 194 at the 2011.
