= Harald Tammur =

Estonian clergyman

Harald Tammur (5 January 1917 Varnja, Kavastu Parish, Tartu County – 12 May 2001 Tartu) was an Estonian Lutheran clergyman.

Tammur studied theology at the University of Tartu between 1936 and 1940, philosophy from 1940 until 1943 and again theology in 1943. In the summer of 1943, during the German occupation of Estonia, together with two other members of the Estonian Students' Society, he hid the first Estonian national flag from occupying forces. He was arrested in 1944 by the Sicherheitspolizei, the German security police, and transferred to the Stutthof concentration camp. Released in 1945, he returned to Estonia, which was by then occupied and annexed by the Soviet Union, and was then arrested by Soviet NKVD officers in Tartu the same year and placed with the gulag camp system in Kemerovo Oblast in Siberia.

After his release in 1950, he was ordained in 1954 in the Estonian Evangelical Lutheran Church and was the pastor of the congregation at Nõo from 1954 until 1979, at the same time also a pastor and teacher at Rannu congregation from 1965 until 1979, and the Elva congregation from 1972 until 1979. From 1979 until 1997, he was the pastor in St. John's Church in Tartu, and the Kambja congregation from 1979 until 1995, and from 1981 until 1996, he was the provost of Tartu.

He was an honorary alumnus of the Estonian Students' Society.

In 1996, he was awarded with Order of the National Coat of Arms, II class.

Tammur is buried at Raadi Cemetery in Tartu.
