= Sõõru =

Village in Estonia

- Village
- Location within Estonia
- Coordinates: 58.644166666667°N 26.910277777778°E
- Country: Estonia
- County: Tartu County
- Parish: Peipsiääre Parish
- Time zone: UTC+2 (EET)
  - Summer (DST): UTC+3 (EEST)

Sõõru is a village in Peipsiääre Parish, Tartu County in Estonia.
