= Saburi =

Village in Estonia

Coordinates: 58°33′21″N 27°06′59″E

- Village
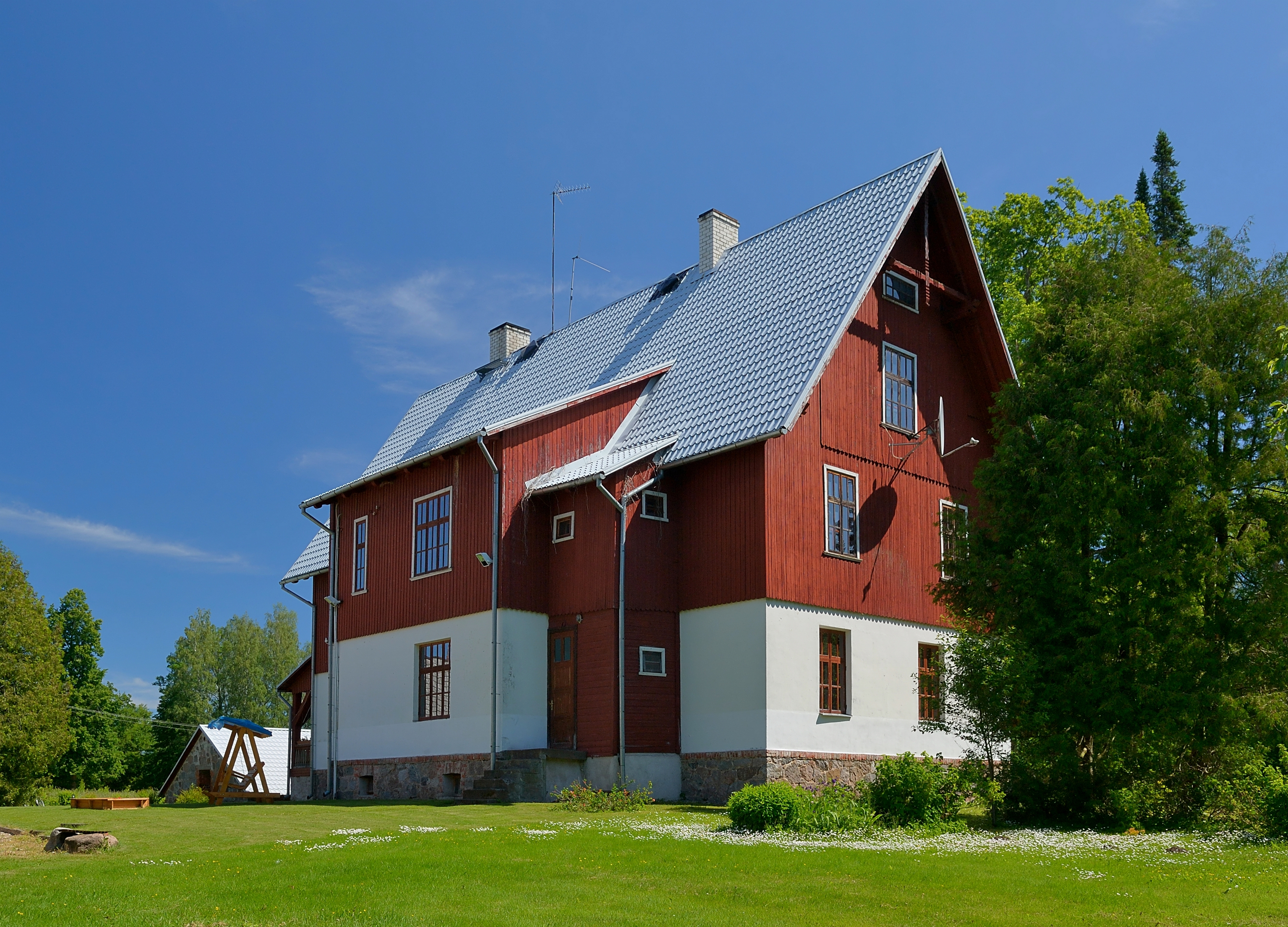
- Saburi hunting estate
- Interactive map of Saburi
- Country: Estonia
- County: Tartu County
- Parish: Peipsiääre Parish
- Time zone: UTC+2 (EET)
  - Summer (DST): UTC+3 (EEST)

Saburi is a village in Peipsiääre Parish, Tartu County in eastern Estonia.
