= Matjama =

Village in Estonia

- Village
- Location in Estonia
- Coordinates: 58°30′42″N 26°56′05″E
- Country: Estonia
- County: Tartu County
- Municipality: Peipsiääre Parish

Population (2011 Census)
  - Total: 55

Matjama is a village in Peipsiääre Parish, Tartu County, Estonia. It is located by the Jõhvi–Tartu–Valga road (E264). As of the 2011 census, the settlement's population was 55.

Matjama was the location of one of the earliest libraries in Tartu County, established in 1883.

The theologist, orientalist, and syriologist Arthur Võõbus (1909–1988) was born in Matjama.
