= Savimetsa =

Village in Estonia

Coordinates: 58°34′N 27°12′E

- Village
- Interactive map of Savimetsa
- Country: Estonia
- County: Tartu County
- Parish: Peipsiääre Parish
- Time zone: UTC+2 (EET)
  - Summer (DST): UTC+3 (EEST)

Savimetsa is a village in Peipsiääre Parish, Tartu County in eastern Estonia.
