= Nina, Estonia =

Village in Estonia

Coordinates: 58°36′N 27°12′E

Nina
- Village
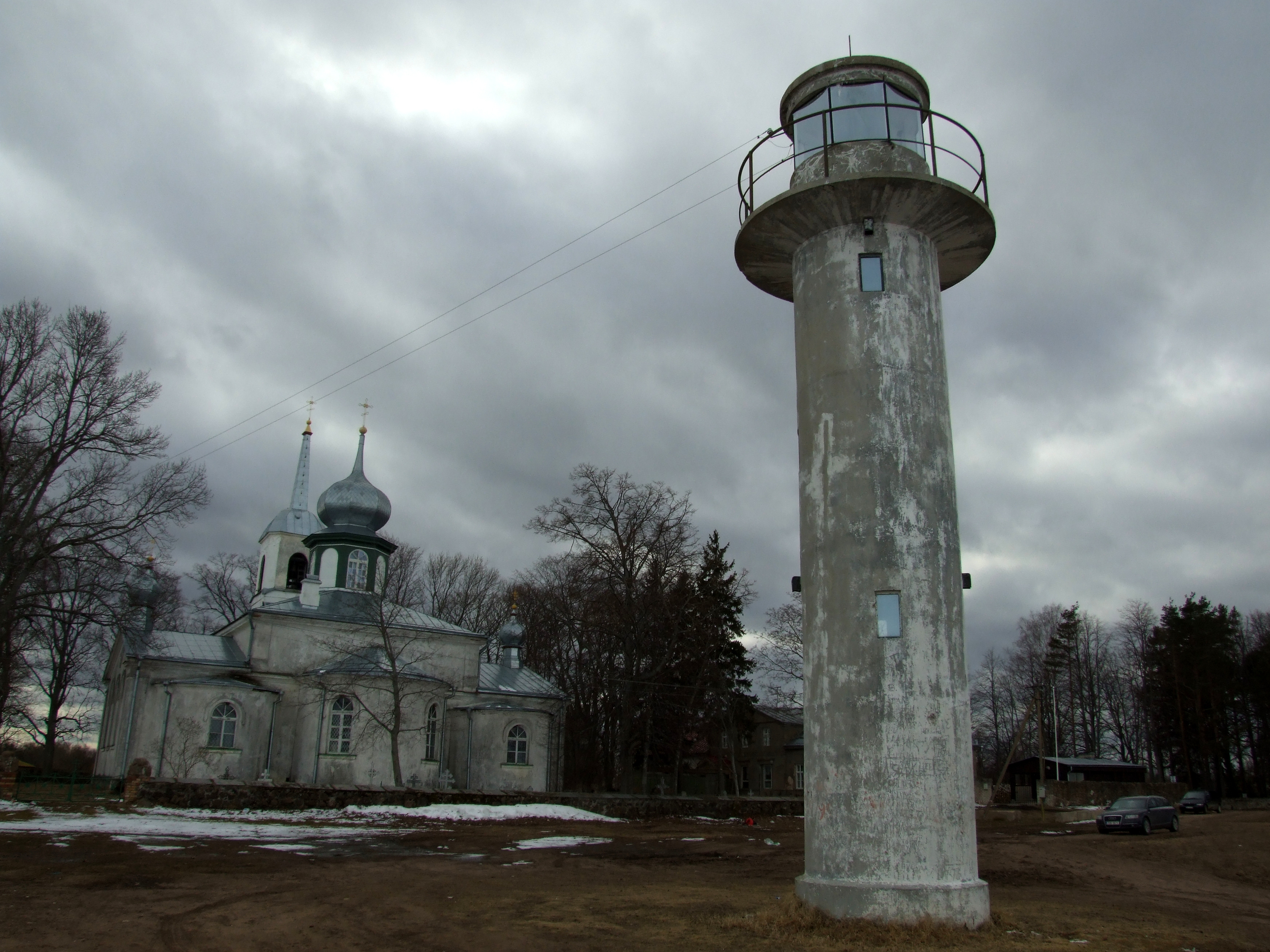
- Protection of the Mother of God Church and lighthouse in Nina
- Interactive map of Nina
- Country: Estonia
- County: Tartu County
- Parish: Peipsiääre Parish
- Time zone: UTC+2 (EET)
  - Summer (DST): UTC+3 (EEST)

Nina is a village in Peipsiääre Parish, Tartu County in eastern Estonia.

== Name ==
Nina was attested in historical documents as Nennalt in 1722, Nänna in 1758, and Nos Derewnija and Nin̄akülla in 1796. The village was known as Носъ (Nos) in Russian. Both the Estonian name (cf. nina 'nose; cape, spit') and Russian name (cf. нос, nos 'nose; headland, promontory, point') refer to the cape where the village is located.
