= Pusi =

Village in Estonia

Coordinates: 58°39′N 27°10′E

Pussi
- Village
- Interactive map of Pussi
- Country: Estonia
- County: Tartu County
- Parish: Peipsiääre Parish
- Time zone: UTC+2 (EET)
  - Summer (DST): UTC+3 (EEST)

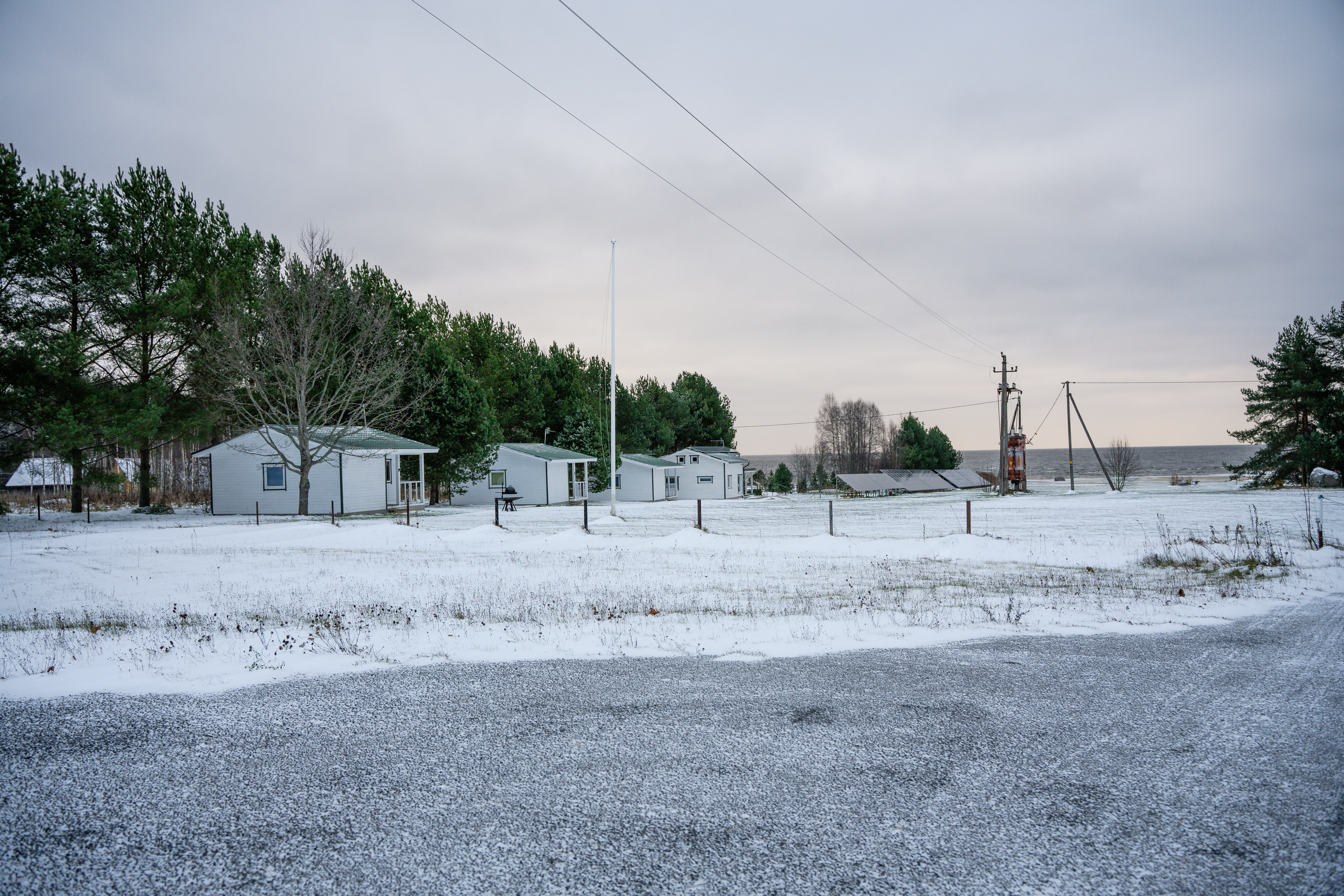
Adds Image, According to Wikipedia

Pussi is a village in Peipsiääre Parish, Tartu County in eastern Estonia.
