= Padakõrve =

Village in Estonia

Coordinates: 58°35′N 27°03′E

- Village
- Interactive map of Padakõrve
- Country: Estonia
- County: Tartu County
- Parish: Peipsiääre Parish
- Time zone: UTC+2 (EET)
  - Summer (DST): UTC+3 (EEST)

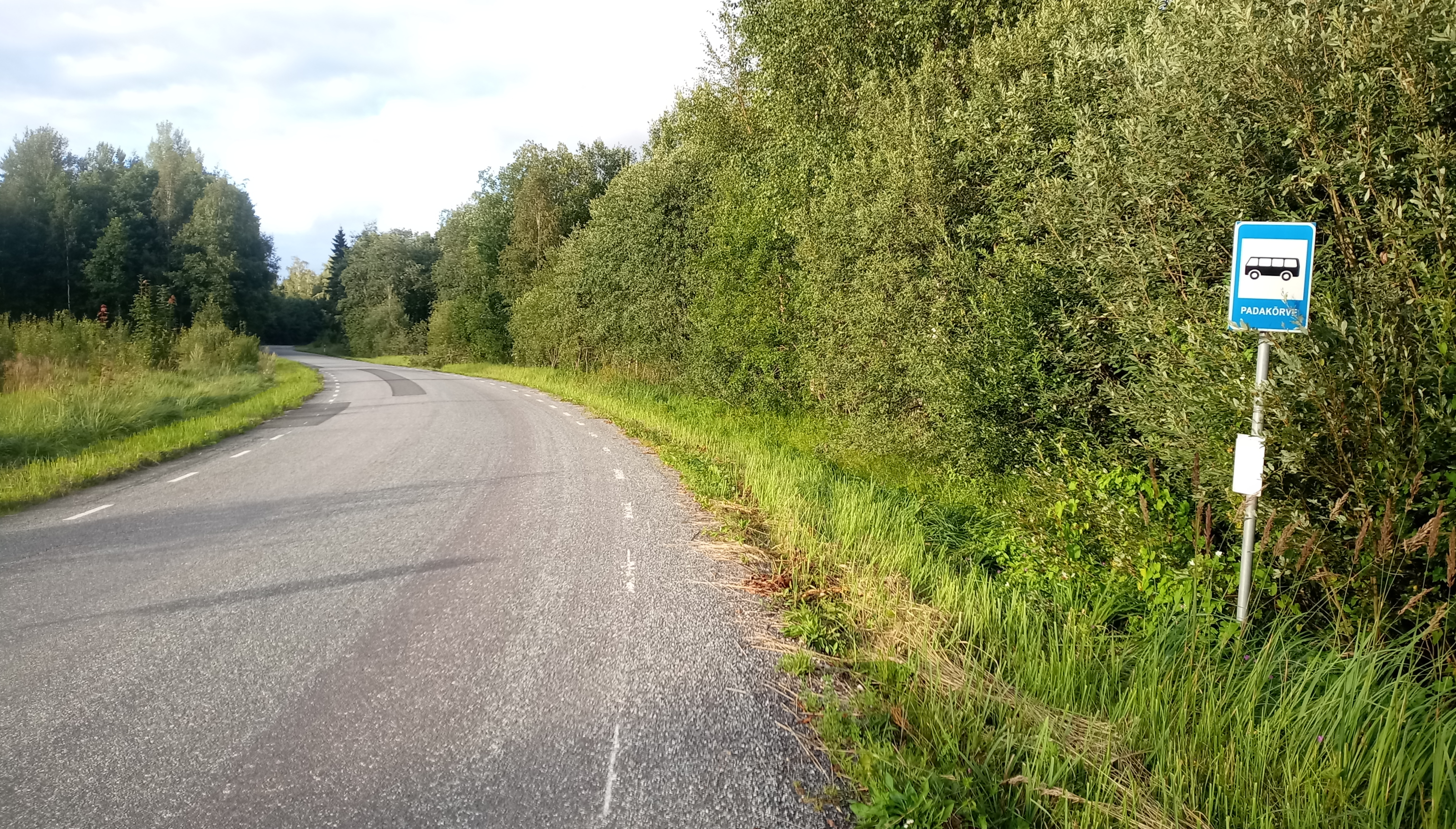
Bus stop in Padakõrve village.

Padakõrve is a village in Peipsiääre Parish, Tartu County in eastern Estonia.
