= Kokanurga =

Village in Estonia

- Village
- Location within Estonia
- Coordinates: 58.706944444444°N 26.983333333333°E
- Country: Estonia
- County: Tartu County
- Parish: Peipsiääre Parish
- Time zone: UTC+2 (EET)
  - Summer (DST): UTC+3 (EEST)

Kokanurga is a village in Peipsiääre Parish, Tartu County in Estonia. Its zipcode is 49408.
