= Varnja =

Borough in Estonia

- Small borough
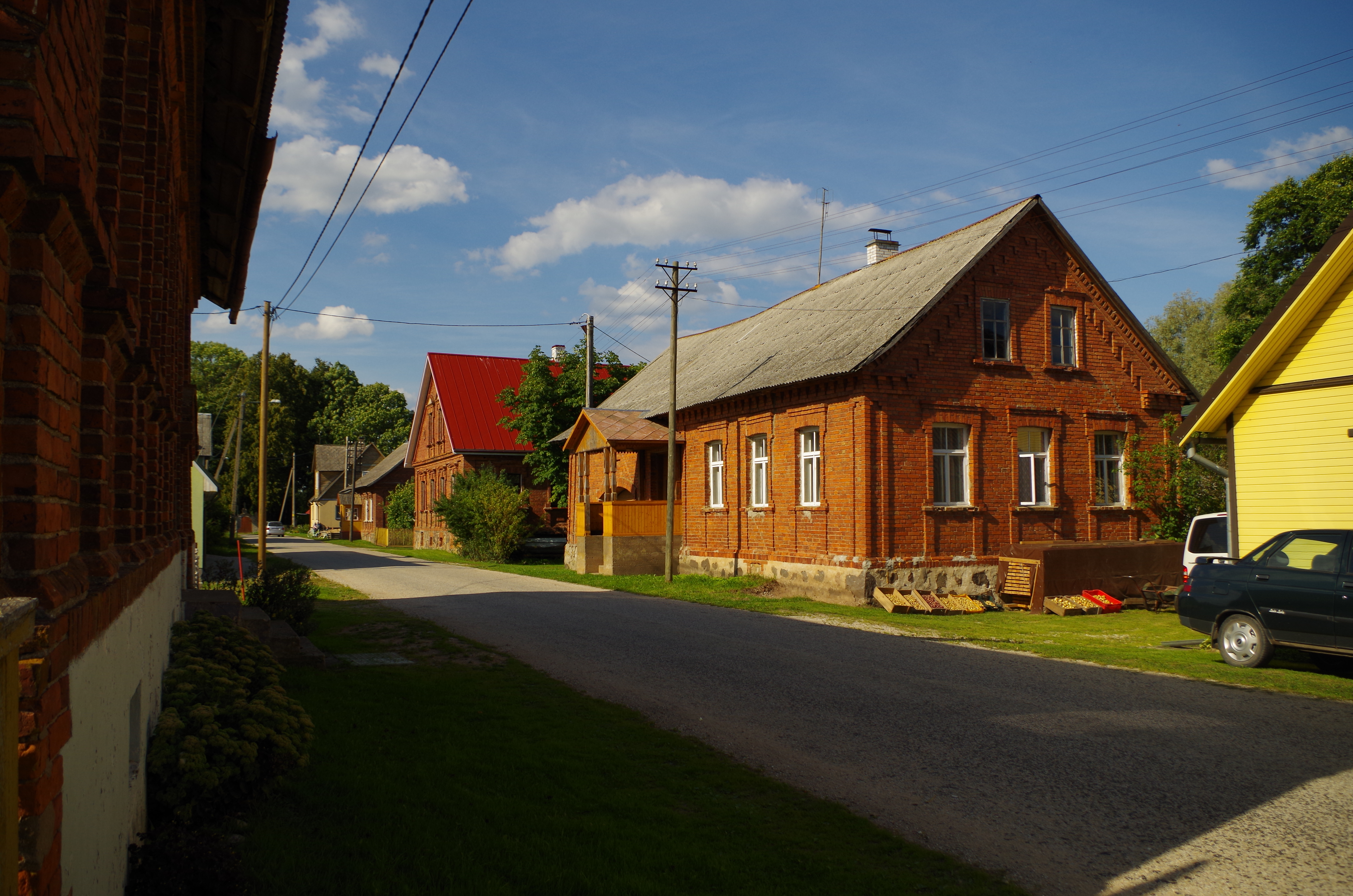

- Location in Estonia
- Coordinates: 58°29′30″N 27°14′20″E
- Country: Estonia
- County: Tartu County
- Municipality: Peipsiääre Parish

Population (2011 Census)
  - Total: 171

Drone video of Varnja village in August 2021

Varnja is a small borough (Estonian: alevik) in Peipsiääre Parish, Tartu County, in northeastern Estonia. As of the 2011 census, the settlement's population was 171.

== Gallery ==
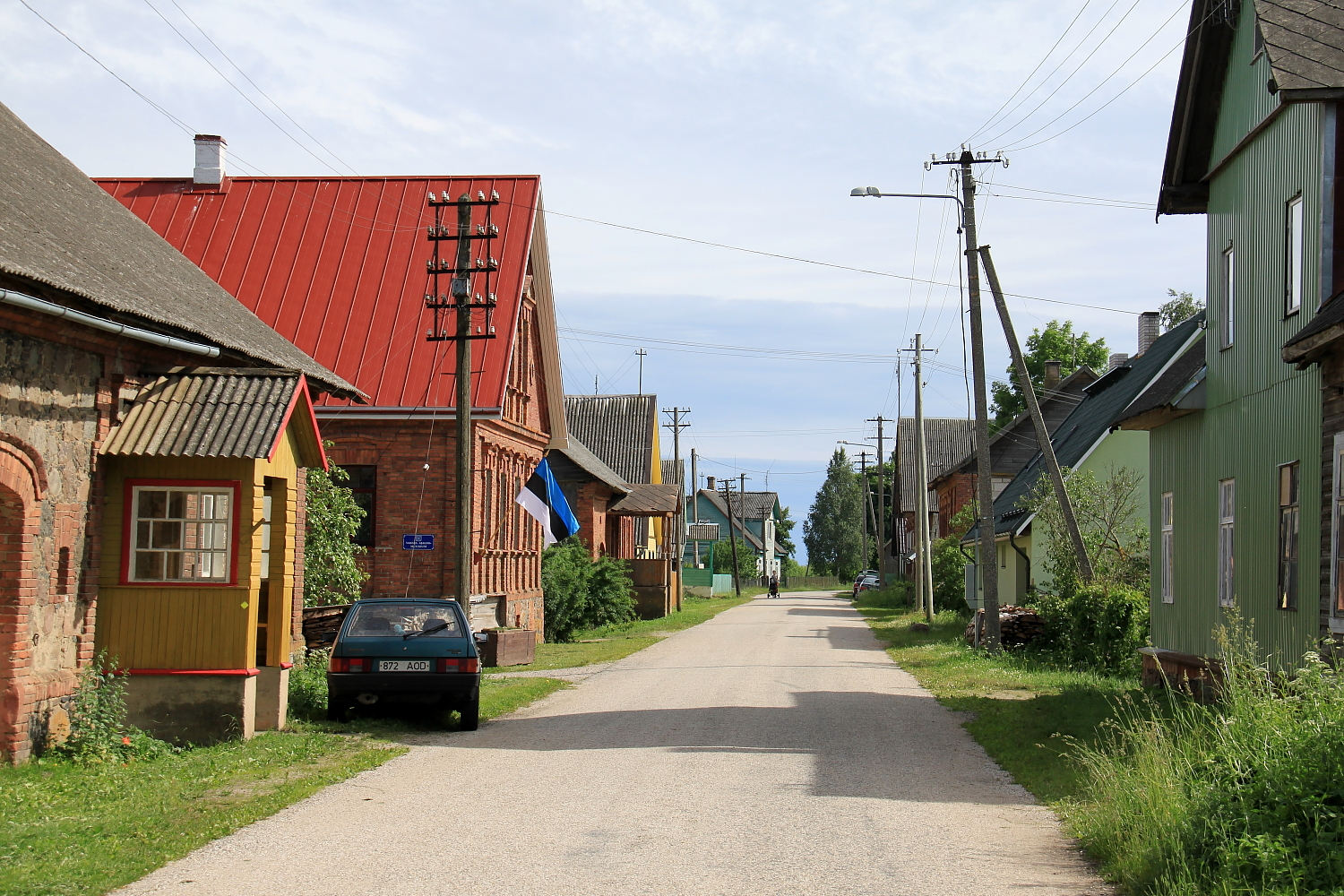
Street in Varnja

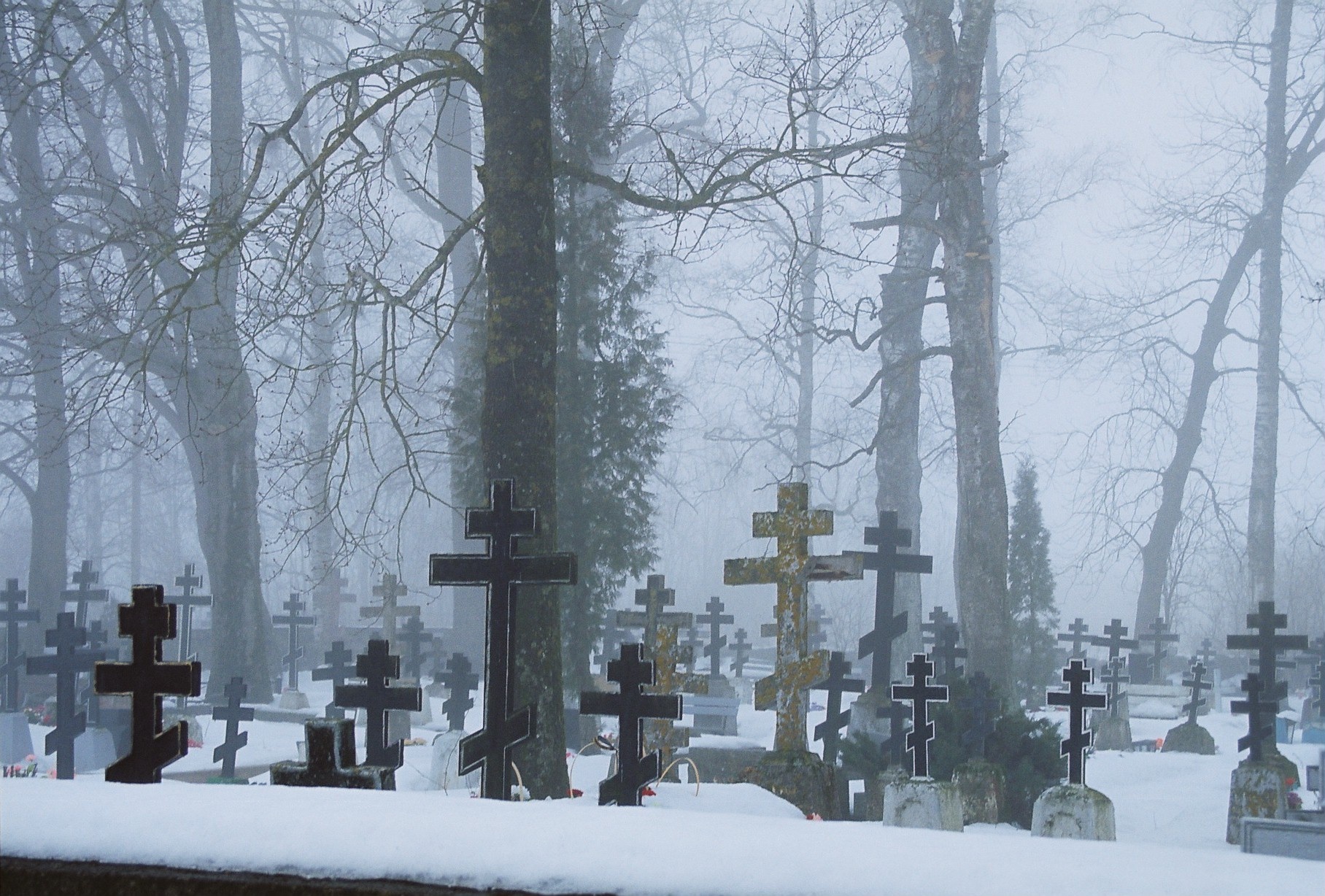
Old Believers' cemetery in Varnja
