= Lahe, Tartu County =

Village in Estonia

Lahe
- Village
- Interactive map of Lahe
- Coordinates: 58.575°N 27.205°E
- Country: Estonia
- County: Tartu County
- Parish: Peipsiääre Parish
- Time zone: UTC+2 (EET)
  - Summer (DST): UTC+3 (EEST)
- Area code: 60208
- Website: www.facebook.com/ pages/ Lahepera-Tartumaa-Estonia/ 111441212210205

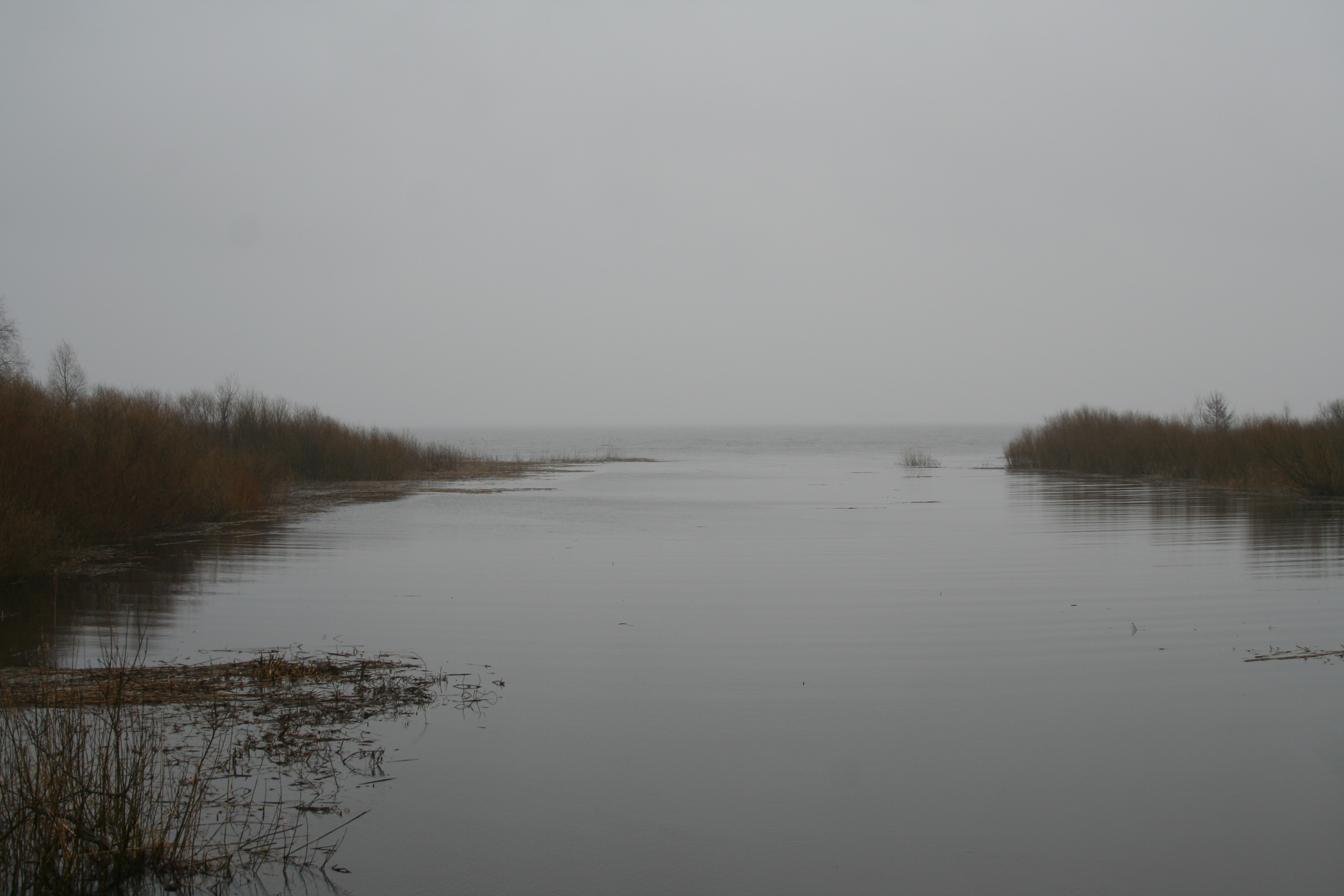

Lahe is a village in Peipsiääre Parish, Tartu County in eastern Estonia.
