= Alasoo =

Village in Estonia

- Village
- Location within Estonia
- Coordinates: 58°37′30″N 27°10′00″E
- Country: Estonia
- County: Tartu County
- Parish: Peipsiääre Parish

Population (2012)
  - Total: 96
- Time zone: UTC+2 (EET)
  - Summer (DST): UTC+3 (EEST)

Alasoo is a village in Peipsiääre Parish, Tartu County in eastern Estonia.
