= Pala, Tartu County =

Village in Estonia

- Village
- Location within Estonia
- Coordinates: 58.6739°N 27.0336°E
- Country: Estonia
- County: Tartu County
- Parish: Peipsiääre Parish
- Time zone: UTC+2 (EET)
  - Summer (DST): UTC+3 (EEST)

Pala (German: Palla) is a village in Peipsiääre Parish, Tartu County in Estonia. As of the year 2021, it had a population of 206.
