= Tõruvere =

Village in Estonia

Coordinates: 58°37′N 27°05′E

- Village
- Interactive map of Tõruvere
- Country: Estonia
- County: Tartu County
- Parish: Peipsiääre Parish
- Time zone: UTC+2 (EET)
  - Summer (DST): UTC+3 (EEST)

Tõruvere is a village in Peipsiääre Parish, Tartu County in eastern Estonia, with a census population at the end of 2011 of 13.

It is located in the northeast of the county, near the Emajõgi River, the western shore of Lake Peipus, and the border with Russia and Jõgeva County.
