= Torila =

Village in Estonia

Coordinates: 58°39′N 27°07′E

- Village
- Interactive map of Torila
- Country: Estonia
- County: Tartu County
- Parish: Peipsiääre Parish
- Time zone: UTC+2 (EET)
  - Summer (DST): UTC+3 (EEST)

Torila is a village in Peipsiääre Parish, Tartu County in eastern Estonia.

Composer and conductor Eduard Tubin (1905–1982) was born in Torila.
