= Savastvere =

Village in Estonia

Coordinates: 58°37′N 27°04′E

- Village
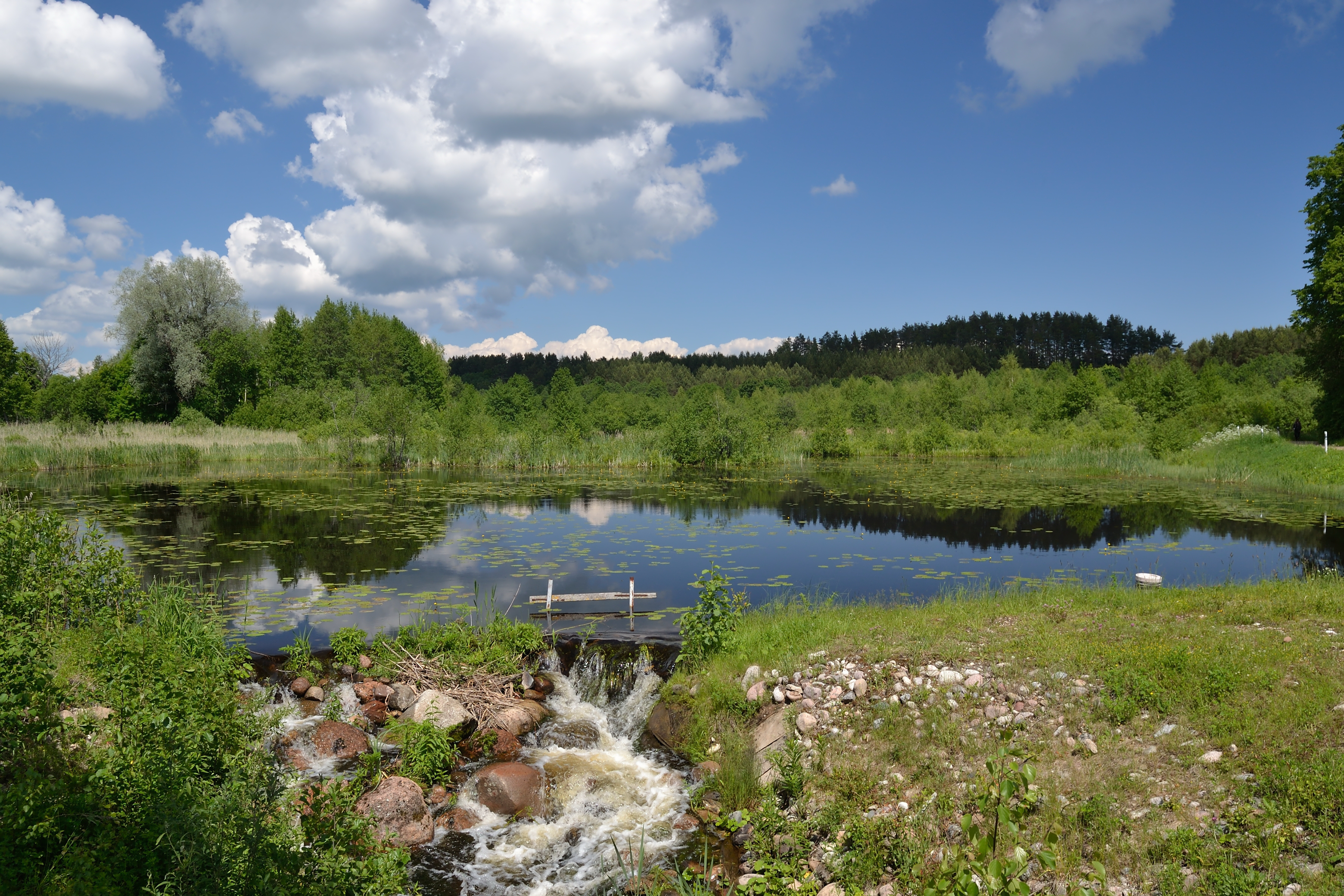
- Savastvere mill lake
- Interactive map of Savastvere
- Country: Estonia
- County: Tartu County
- Parish: Peipsiääre Parish
- Time zone: UTC+2 (EET)
  - Summer (DST): UTC+3 (EEST)

Savastvere is a village in Peipsiääre Parish, Tartu County in eastern Estonia.
