= Ätte =

Village in Tartu County, Estonia

- Village
- Location within Estonia
- Coordinates: 58.482222222222°N 26.887222222222°E
- Country: Estonia
- County: Tartu County
- Parish: Peipsiääre Parish
- Time zone: UTC+2 (EET)
  - Summer (DST): UTC+3 (EEST)

Ätte is a village in Peipsiääre Parish, Tartu County in Estonia.
