= Tähemaa =

Village in Estonia

- Village
- Location within Estonia
- Coordinates: 58°26′56″N 27°04′27″E
- Country: Estonia
- County: Tartu County
- Parish: Peipsiääre Parish

Area
  - Total: 25.67 km^{2} (9.91 sq mi)

Population (2021)
  - Total: 60
  - Density: 2.34/km^{2} (6.1/sq mi)
- Time zone: UTC+2 (EET)
  - Summer (DST): UTC+3 (EEST)

Tähemaa is a village in Peipsiääre Parish, Tartu County in Estonia. As of 2021, the village has a population of 60.
