= Rootsiküla, Tartu County =

Village in Estonia

Coordinates: 58°37′26″N 27°11′01″E

- Village
- Interactive map of Rootsiküla, Tartu County
- Country: Estonia
- County: Tartu County
- Parish: Peipsiääre Parish
- Time zone: UTC+2 (EET)
  - Summer (DST): UTC+3 (EEST)

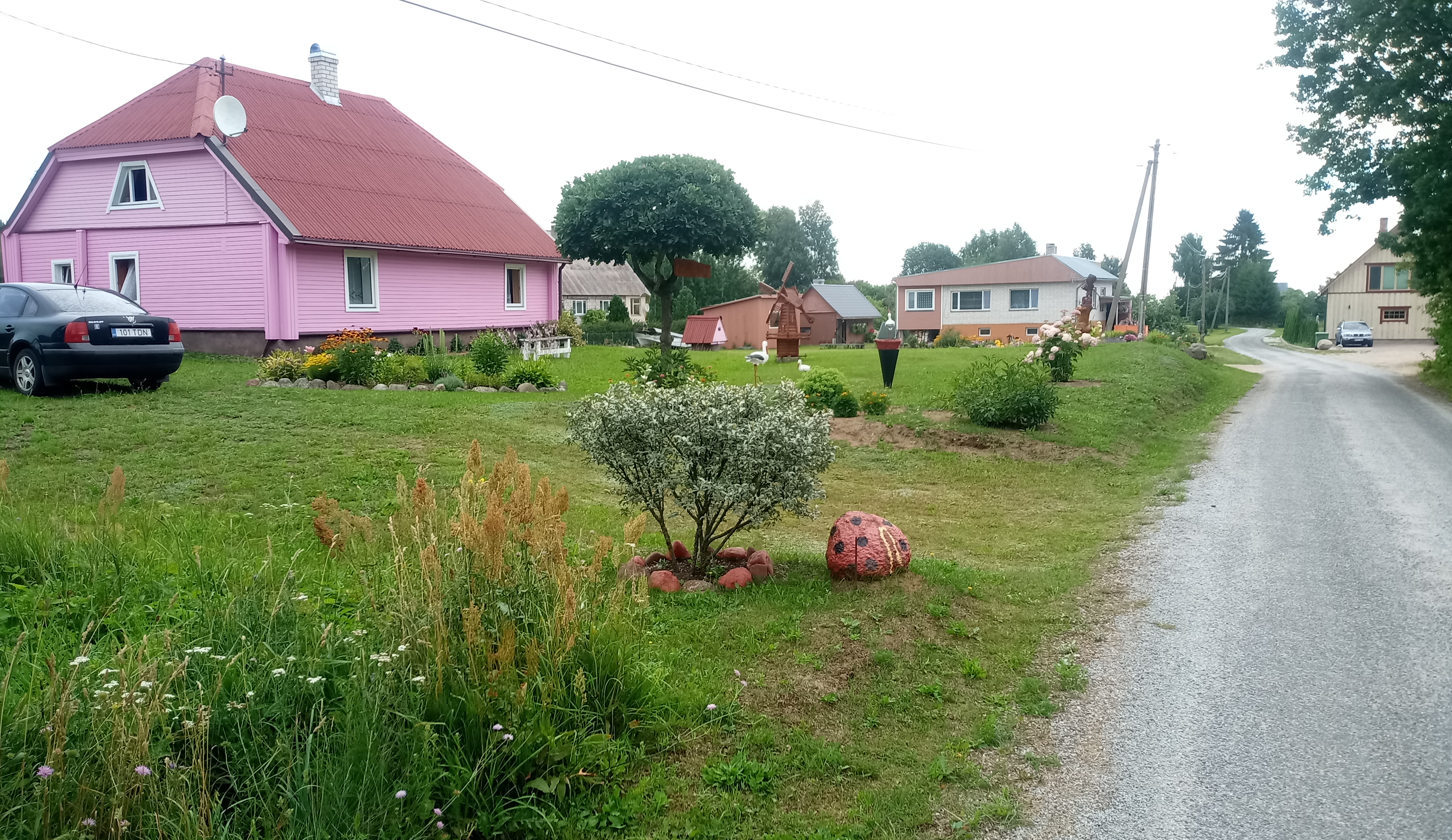

Rootsiküla is a village in Peipsiääre Parish, Tartu County in eastern Estonia.
