= Välgi =

Village in Estonia

- Village
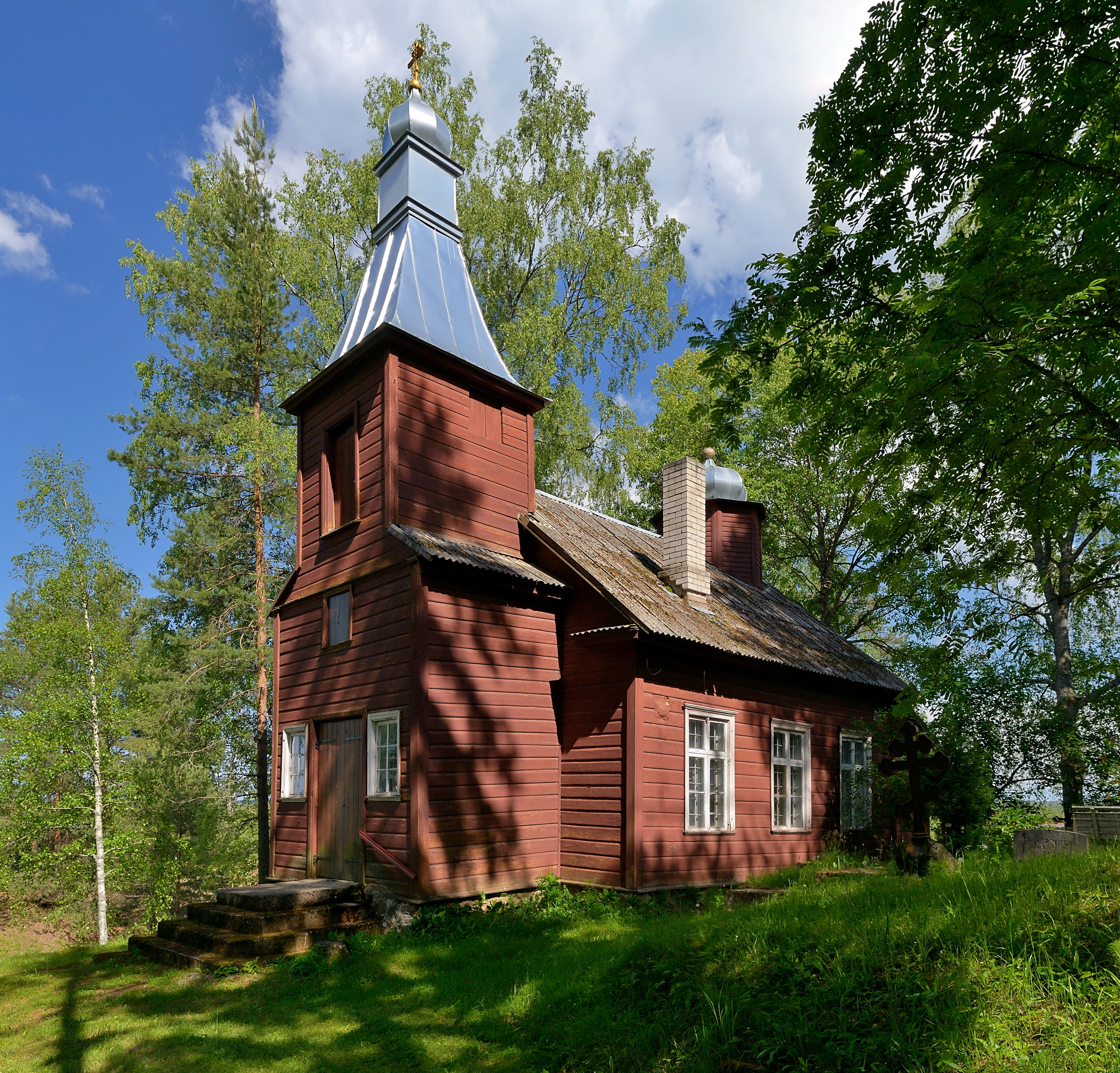
- Välgi Orthodox church

- Location within Estonia
- Coordinates: 58.586666666667°N 26.891388888889°E
- Country: Estonia
- County: Tartu County
- Parish: Peipsiääre Parish
- Time zone: UTC+2 (EET)
  - Summer (DST): UTC+3 (EEST)

Välgi is a village in Peipsiääre Parish, Tartu County in Estonia.
