= Mustametsa, Tartu County =

Village in Estonia

Coordinates: 58°35′13″N 26°51′53″E

Mustametsa
- Village
- Interactive map of Mustametsa
- Country: Estonia
- County: Tartu County
- Parish: Peipsiääre Parish
- Time zone: UTC+2 (EET)
  - Summer (DST): UTC+3 (EEST)

Mustametsa is a village in Peipsiääre Parish, Tartu County in Estonia.
