= Lill =

Family name

Lill is a surname. When borne by Estonian individuals, it means "flower". People with the surname Lill include:

- Alfred John Lill, Jr. (1880–1956), American former president of the Amateur Athletic Union and member of the United States Olympic Committee
- Alick Lill (1904–1987), Australian rules footballer
- Andreas Lill (born 1965), German drummer (Vanden Plas)
- Anne Lill (born 1946), Estonian classical philologist and translator
- Calum Lill (born 1995 or 1996), British actor
- Darren Lill (born 1982), South African racing cyclist
- David Lill (born 1947), English footballer
- Denis Lill (born 1942), British actor
- Eduard Lill (1830–1900), Austrian engineer and army officer
- Erkki Lill (born 1968), Estonian curler and curling coach
- Harri Lill (born 1991), Estonian curler
- Heino Lill (born 1944), Estonian basketball coach and basketball player
- Ivo Lill (1953–2019), Estonian glass artist
- Jim Lill (born 19??), American country musician
- John Lill (born 1933), Australian cricketer
- John Lill (born 1944), British classical pianist
- Kristiine Lill (born 1971), Estonian curler and curling coach
- Mari Lill (born 1945), Estonian actress
- Mari-Liis Lill (born 1983), Estonian actress
- Märt-Matis Lill (born 1975), Estonian composer
- Martin Lill (born 1972), Estonian curler and curling coach
- Mickey Lill (1936–2004), English footballer
- Paul Lill (1882–1942), Estonian military officer and politician
- Pille Lill (born 1962), Estonian opera singer
- PJ van Lill (born 1983), Namibian rugby union player

== See also ==
- Lille
- Lilly (disambiguation)
