= Tartu Medal =

Estonian award

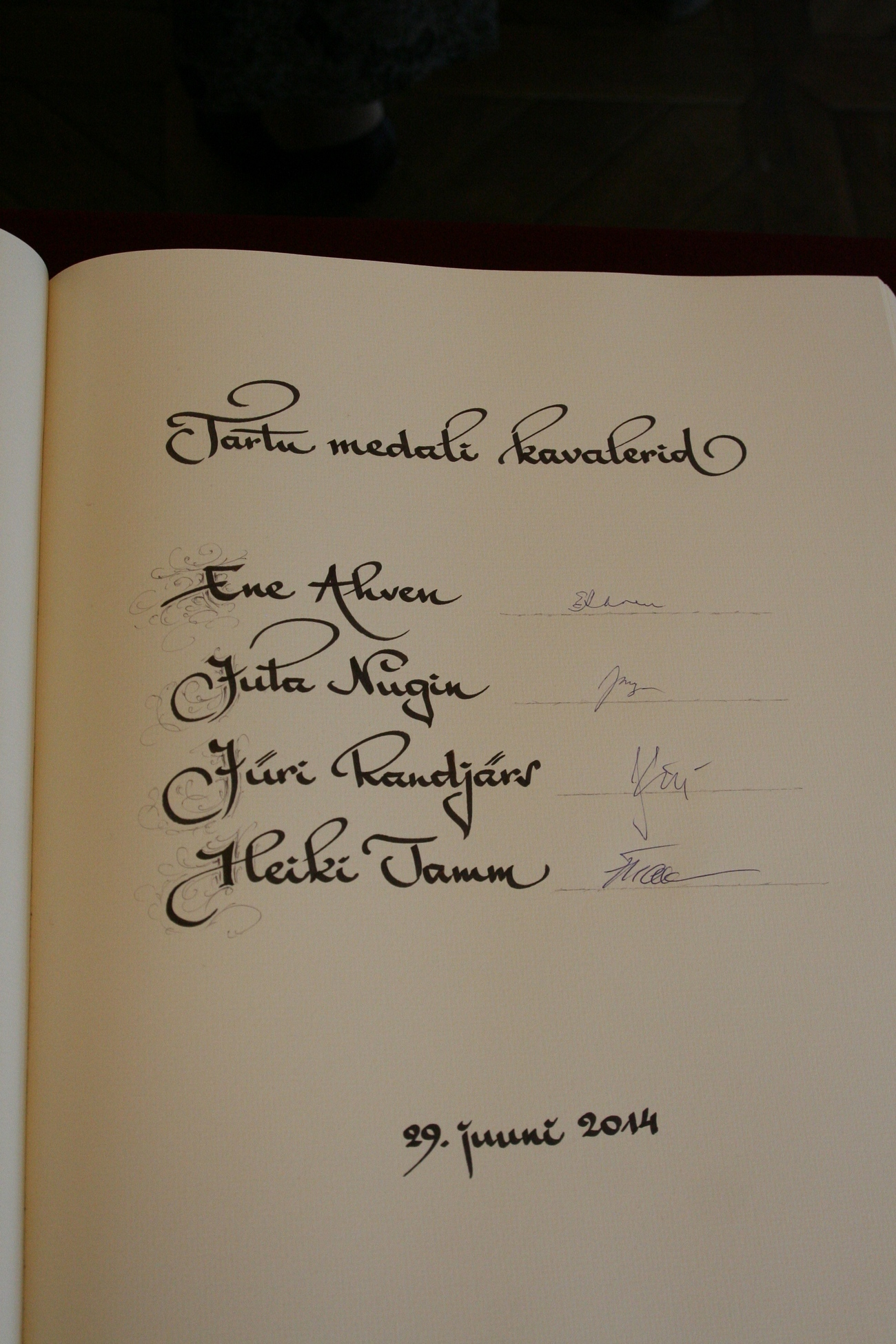
Medal's recipients in Tartu Honorary Book (Estonian: Tartu auraamat), 2014

Tartu Medal (Estonian: Tartu medal) is an award which is given out on 29 June (Tartu City Day) by Tartu City Government. The award was established in 2002.

== Recipients ==
Recipients:

- 2002: Kalle Kasemaa, Arvo Kivikas, Jaak Aaviksoo, Jaanus Harro, Mati Alaver, Anders Gunnar Bergström, Bertil Lindström, Margit Sepp
- 2003: Aleksander Maastik, Külli Praakli, Sigrid Aru, Ulrich Mädge, John Winther, Peeter Tulviste
- 2004: Allan Liim, Tiina Talvik, Jüri Samarütel, Erna Boston, Bengt Ingvar Bylund, Tiia Toomet, Nils Bernhard Sachris
- 2005: Wilhelm Poser, Wolfgang Koch, Jaan Kross, Ela-Heigi Martis, Henning Kramer, Kaur Alttoa, Nils Hollberg
- 2006: Ants Nilson, Irene Leisner, Hilja Sepp, Sirje Karis, Aino-Eevi Lukas, Aivar Mäe
- 2007: John-Erik Thun and Per-Edvin Persson, Valve Lepik, Peeter Lokk, Kuno Jürjenson, Lennart Jõela
- 2008: Tarmo Noop, Gunnar Hedberg, Jüri Talvet, Guido Arro, Valve Rehema, Vambola Raudsepp, Ain Nõmm, Lembit Lump
- 2009: Valdur Tiit, Taavo Virkhaus, Reino Lemmetyinen
- 2010: Jaak Kikas, Raivo Adlas, Vilma Trummal, Kalle Mesila, Endel Nõgene
- 2011: Tõnis Mägi, Gunnar Rafn Sigurbjörnsson, Kari Kolehmainen, Ain Heinaru, Maido Madisson
- 2012: Maire Breede and Vladimir Heerik, Timo Paavo Nieminen
- 2013: Kenneth Holmstedt, Hiie Asser, Enno Tubli
- 2014: Ene Ahven, Juta Nugin, Jüri Randjärv, Heiki Tamm, Anne Ormisson
- 2015: Olga Einasto, Ülle Kuusik, Toomas Lepp, Jaanus Rooba, Ilona Smuškina
- 2016: Valentina Frunze, Margo Külaots, Toivo Pilli, Enriko Talvistu, Johan Tralla
- 2017: Liidia Konsa, Tatjana Ojavere, Ene Peiker, Anu Reinart and Andrus Tasa
- 2018: Andres Gailit, Rein Lemberpuu, Riho Leppoja, Aili Michelson, Maria Rõõmusoks
- 2019: Hele Kiisel, Merike Kull, Vallot Mangus, Vambola Niit, Raimonds Vējonis
