= Inger Edelfeldt =

Swedish writer and illustrator, born 1956

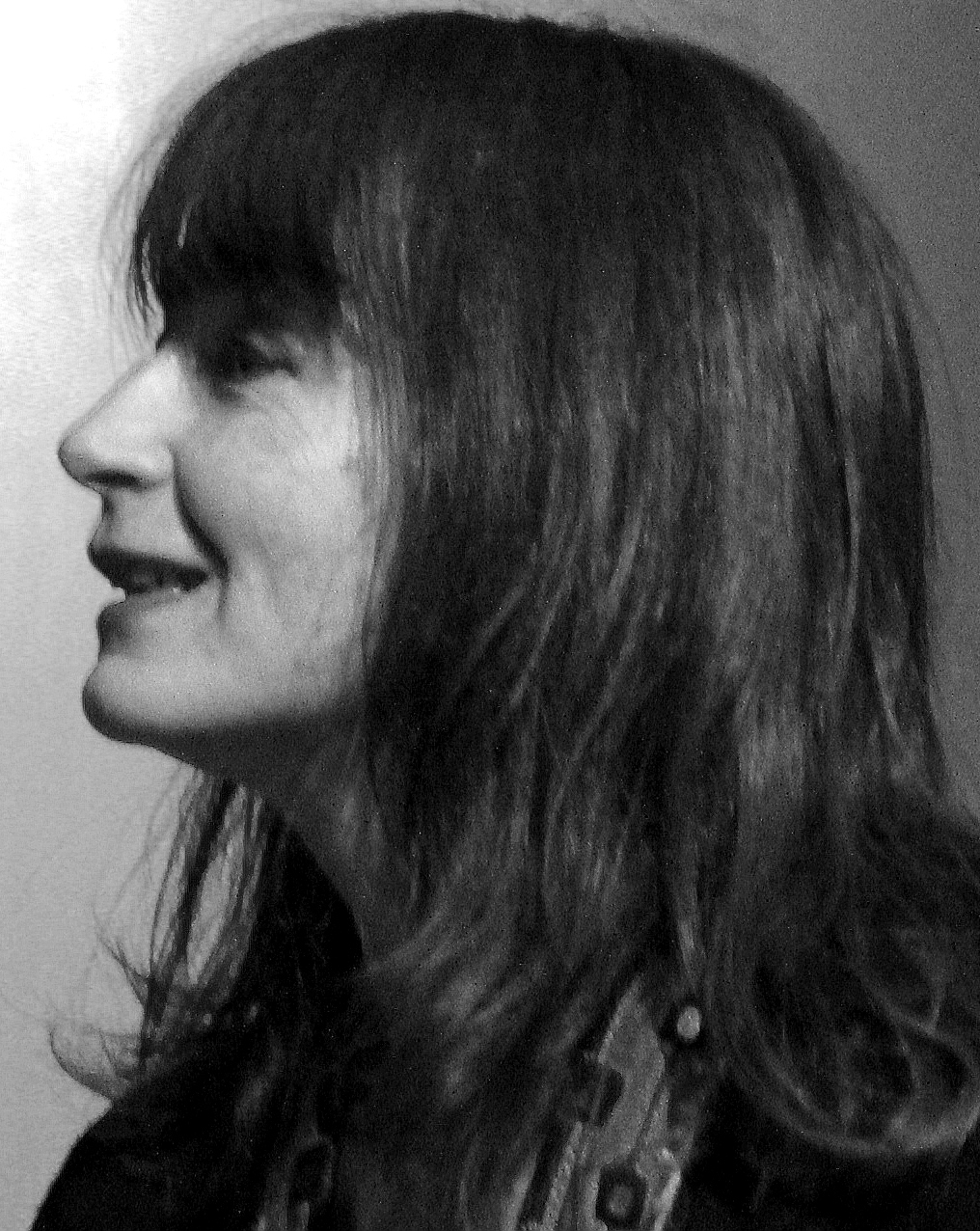
- Inger Edelfeldt at the Gothenburg Book Fair in 2014
- Born: 14 July 1956 (age 70); Stockholm, Sweden
- Occupations: Author; Illustrator; Translator; Comic book creator
- Writing career
- Language: Swedish
- Years active: 1977–
- Notable work: Duktig pojke ("Good Boy")
- Website: edelfeldt.blogspot.se

Inger Edelfeldt (born 14 July 1956) is a Swedish author, illustrator and translator. Many of her books are for young adults and children.

== Personal life ==
Edelfeldt was born in Stockholm in 1956. Her father was an engineer and her mother was a house wife. Her father used to tell her stories before he went to work in the mornings. He also had depression and was treated with electrotherapy. The situation at home reflected on the young Edelfeldt, she was bullied at school which lead to self-harming behaviour. As an adult she tried several therapies and finally settled on Zen coaching and meditation.

== Career ==
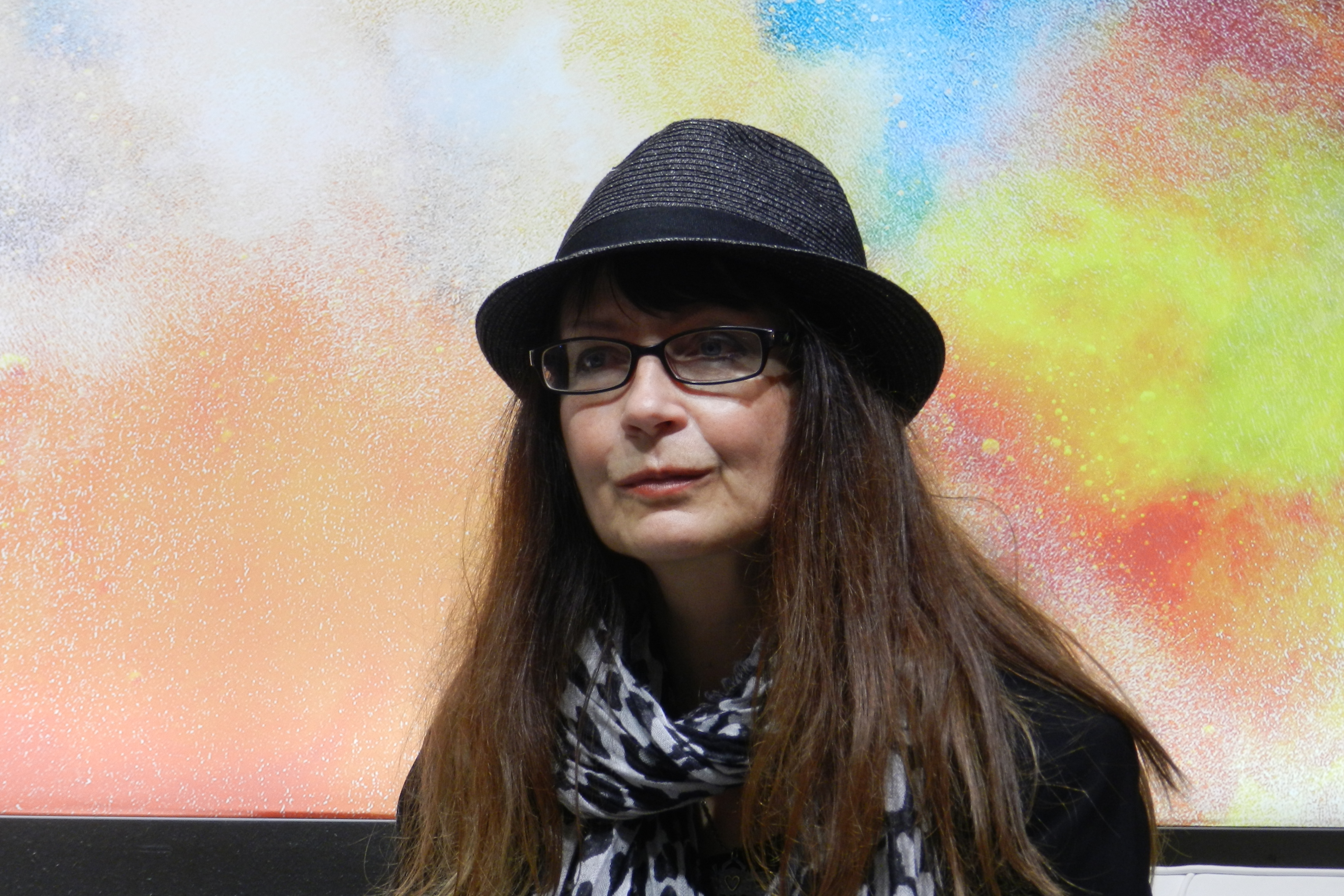
Edelfeldt at the Gothenburg Book Fair, 2019

Edelfeldt made her debut in 1977 with the book Duktig pojke ("Good Boy"). The novel is about the boy Jim who is lonely and asserts himself by excelling in school. The book was later reworked into a book for young adults and it is regarded as one of the first coming out novels in Sweden. She has written more than 30 books since then, most of which are novels, short stories, poetry books, comic books and books for children and young people. Edelfeldt's young adult novels often revolves around subjects like identity and efforts of liberation. Another common theme is mans double nature, the mirror image and the dark side of a good life. She writes in a multitude of styles such as satire, fable, drama and has been described as easy to read with a special sense of humor.

"[Edelfeldt]...is a crossbreed between Astrid Lindgren and Franz Kafka."

— Göran Hägg, docent in literary science

Edelfeldt is a self-taught artist and she says that she has been inspired by the works of Leonardo da Vinci, Arthur Rackham and Maurice Sendak. She has worked as an illustrator since 1976. She made watercolour paintings for the 1985 edition of the Tolkien calendar in the United States and the United Kingdom.

== In other media ==
In 1995, the Swedish television the TV-series Nattens barn ("The Children of the night"), made after Edelfeldt's young adult novel Julliane och jag ("Juliane and me"). The series was directed by Lisa Ohlin.

On 30 July 1990, Edelfeldt hosted the noted radio program Sommar I P1.

== Selected works ==
=== Own books ===
- Duktig pojke (Good Boy, 1977)
- Hustru (Wife, novel, 1978)
- Missne och Robin (Missne and Robin, illustrated by the author, 1980)
- Kärlekens kirurgi (Surgery of love, novel, 1981)
- Juliane och jag (Juliane and me, released in 1995 by the name Nattens barn, 1982)
- I fiskens mage (In the Belly of the Fish, 1984)
- Drakvinden (Dragon Wind, 1984)
- Breven till nattens drottning (Letters to the Queen of the Night, 1985)
- Kamalas bok (Kamala's Book, 1986)
- Den täta elden (Dense Fire, 1987)
- Den kvinnliga mystiken (The Mystique of Women, comic book, 1988)
- Hondjuret (She-animal, comic book, 1989)
- Den förskräckliga lilla mamsellens stol (The Chair of the dreadful little Mamselle, children's book, 1989)
- Rit (Rite, short stories, 1991)
- Genom den röda dörren eller Sagan om den lilla flickan, Gråtkungen och Lejonpojken (Through the Red Door, or Tale of the little girl, the Crying-King and the Lion boy, illustrated by the author, 1992)
- Nattbarn (Night Child, illustrated by the author, 1994)
- Den förunderliga kameleonten (The Remarkable Chameleon, short stories, 1995)
- Stackars lilla Bubben (Poor Little Bubben, illustrated by the author, 1996)
- Betraktandet av hundar (Contemplation of Dogs, novel, 1997)
- Ensamrummet (Room of Solitude, 1997)
- Det hemliga namnet (The Secret Name, novel, 1999)
- Salt (poems, 1999)
- Hondjurets samlade värk (Collected Pains of the Female Animal, 2000)
- Riktig kärlek (True Love, 2001)
- Sagan om Ja-trollet och Nej-trollet (Tale of the Yes-troll and No-troll, illustrated by the author, 2002)
- Skuggorna i spegeln (Shadows in the mirror, 2003)
- Efter angelus (After Angelus, poems, 2004)
- Svarta lådan (Black Box, novel, 2004)
- 4 x Edelfeldt (short stories, 2005)
- Finns det liv på Mars? (Is there Life on Mars?, novel, 2006)
- Hemligt ansikte (Secret Face, young-adult fiction, 2007)
- Namnbrunnen (Name Well, 2008)
- Hur jag lärde mig älska mina värsta känslor (How I Learned to Love my Worst Feelings, 2009)
- Samtal med djävulen (Conversation with the Devil, novel, 2010)
- Konsten att dö (The Art of Dying, novel, 2014)

=== Book illustrations, Tolkien (Swedish editions) ===
- Sagan om ringen (The Fellowship of the Ring) by J. R. R. Tolkien, cover illustration (1978)
- Sagan om de två tornen (The Two Towers) by J. R. R. Tolkien, cover illustration (1978)
- Sagan om konungens återkomst (The Return of the King) by J. R. R. Tolkien, cover illustration (1978)
- Silmarillion (The Silmarillion) by J. R. R. Tolkien, cover illustration (1979)
- Ringens värld (appendix from The Return of the King, at first published separately in Sweden) by J. R. R. Tolkien, cover illustration (1980)
- Sagor från Midgård (Unfinished Tales) by J. R. R. Tolkien, cover illustration (1982)
- De förlorade sagornas bok (The Book of Lost Tales) by J. R. R. Tolkien, cover illustration (1986)
- De förlorade sagornas bok II (The Book of Lost Tales 2) by J. R. R. Tolkien, cover illustration (1988)

=== Book illustrations, other authors (Swedish editions) ===
- Att spela människa (Very Far Away from Anywhere Else) by Ursula K. Le Guin, translation and illustrations (1977)
- Det brutna svärdet (The Broken Sword) by Poul Anderson, translation and illustrations (1979)
- Rhiannons svärd (The Sword of Rhiannon) by Leigh Brackett, cover illustration (1979)
- Den Långa Tystnaden (The Long Loud Silence) by Wilson Tucker, cover illustration (1979)
- Moa och Pelle: en kärlekshistoria (Moa and Pelle: a love story) by Kerstin Johansson i Backe, illustrations (1981)
- Sagornas öar: en resa i den grekiska gudavärlden (Islands of the fairy tales: a journey among the Greek gods) by Enel Melberg, illustrations (1982)
- Arrakis – Ökenplaneten (Dune) by Frank Herbert, cover illustration (1982)
- Bröllopet i Marsipanien (The wedding in Marsipanien) by Lena Karlin, illustrations (1985)
- Det var en gång (Once on a Time) by A. A. Milne, illustrations (1986)
- Ljugmusen och andra sagor (The Lying Mouse and other tales) by Ervin Lázár, cover and illustrations (1987)

== Awards ==
- 1987 – Deutscher Jugendliteraturpreis for Breven till nattens drottning
- 1989 – Adamson Diploma from Svenska Serieakademien
- 1991 – Svenska Dagbladet literary award
- 1993 – ABF literature and art stipend
- 1995 – Göteborgs-Posten literary award
- 1995 – Nils Holgersson Plaque for the short story Gravitation
- 1996 – Dobloug Prize
- 1996 – Karl Vennberg's prize
- 1997 – Ivar Lo-Johanssons personal award
- 1998 – Ludvig Nordström award
- 1999 – Gustaf Fröding stipend
- 2019 - Sigtuna foundation writer's scholarship
- 2021 – Stina Aronson Prize
- 2022 – Selma Lagerlöf Prize
