= Komonen =

Surname list

Komonen is a surname. Notable people with the surname include:

- Dave Komonen (1898–1978), Finnish-Canadian athlete in marathon
- Markku Komonen (born 1945), Finnish architect

== See also ==
- Heikkinen – Komonen Architects, Finnish architectural firm
