= Ormisson =

Ormisson is an Estonian surname. Notable people with the surname include:

- Anne Ormisson (born 1942), Estonian medical researcher
- Villem Ormisson (1892–1941), Estonian painter
