= Aino-Eevi Lukas =

Estonian equestrian, lawyer, and politician (1930–2019)

- Born: 29 July 1930; Tallinn, Estonia
- Died: 5 December 2019 (aged 89); Tartu, Estonia
- Occupations: lawyer, politician
- Years active: 1968–2006
- Spouse: Ilmar Rebane
- Father: Jaan Lukas
- Awards: Tartu Medal (2006)

Aino-Eevi Lukas (29 July 1930 – 5 December 2019) was an Estonian equestrian, lawyer and politician. She competed for the national team in her youth in horse jumping and was the national champion in the obstacle course in 1947 and 1949. Earning a degree in law in 1968, she was recognized as the Estonian Lawyer of the Year in 2003. Post independence, she became the first chair of the Tartu City Council and in 2006, was knighted and the Tartu Medal was bestowed upon her.

== Early life and sport ==
Aino-Eevi Lukas was born 29 July 1930 in Tallinn, Republic of Estonia to Martha-Katarina (née Mõttus) and Jaan Lukas. Her father was a career military officer who had taken part in the Estonian War of Independence and would later become a Major General and the Chief of Staff of the Estonian rifle corps. She attended Tallinn Secondary School No. 7, completing her education in 1948.

During her schooling, in 1945, Lukas began riding horses, training under Evald Nõmme and Martin Sootsi. She was selected for the Estonian national team and participated in show jumping obstacle courses, becoming the national obstacles champion of the Estonian SSR in both 1947 and 1949. When in 1950 her father was arrested in the power struggle for party leadership of the Estonian SSR, Lukas left Estonia for fear of reprisals. She began competing for Russia, as a representative of Spartak in Moscow. That year she placed 3rd in the Soviet national jumping championship and was the jumping champion of the Moscow club for 1950 and 1951. In 1952, she became a coach-rider at the Kolmeurne Country Sports Association of Abkhazia, and was the Abkhazian/Georgian national champion between 1952 and 1955. Though her father died in 1953 at the Tayshet forced labor camp in Irkutsk Oblast, Siberia, Lukas would not return to Estonia until 1955.

== Career ==
During her years of competitive jumping, Lukas wrote about equestrian events using the pseudonym A. Loos. She attended law school at Tartu State University (now, the University of Tartu), earning her degree in 1961. After graduating she worked as a journalist and from 1963 to 1968, was the editor-in-chief of the publisher Eesti Raamat.

In 1968, Lukas began working as a lawyer, holding positions on the Legal Commission of the Council of Ministers of the USSR and in the Estonian State Publishing House. As a legal adviser, she assisted in drafting the statutes for the City of Tartu. In 1989, she was elected as the first woman and first chair of the Tartu City Council, after Estonia declared its sovereignty from the USSR the previous year. She was instrumental in establishing new foreign relationships during her tenure and re-establishing independent legislation, while maintaining legal continuity.

After her term on the Council ended in 1993, Lukas served as an appointed defense counsel for the Supreme Court of Estonia in criminal cases. She was recognized as the Estonian "Lawyer of the Year" in 2003 and in 2006 was awarded the Tartu Medal and knighted. In 2008, she co-authored, along with historian Ago Pajur and Uno Lõhmus a judge for the European Court of Justice, Kindral. Professor. Vandeadvokaat (General. Professor. Sworn Advocate.). The memoirs contain reminiscences of Lukas about her own life, that of her father, and of her husband, Ilmar Rebane.

== Death and legacy ==
Lukas died on 5 December 2019 in Tartu and her final services were held at the Tartu Crematorium on 13 December.
