= Enel (disambiguation) =

Enel may refer to:

- Enel, an Italian electricity company
  - Enel Green Power, a renewable energy corporation, subsidiary of Enel
- Enel (One Piece), a fictional villain in the One Piece manga series
- Enel, meaning third in the fiction of J. R. R. Tolkien, cf. Awakening of the Elves
- Enel Brindisi
- Enel Melberg (born 1943), Swedish author and translator
