= Heureka =

Science center in Vantaa, Finland

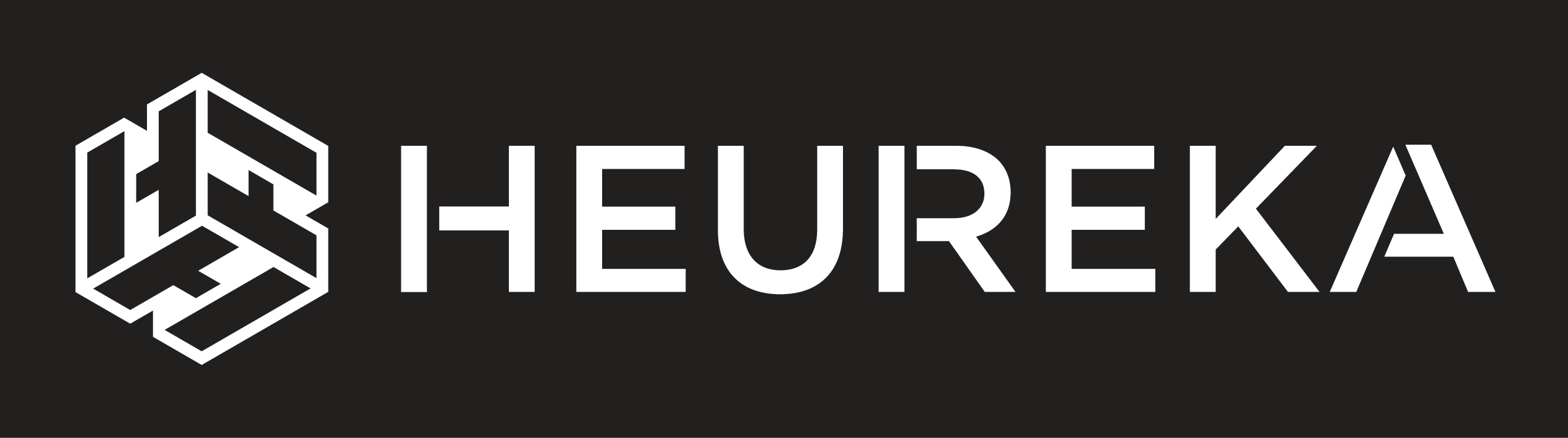

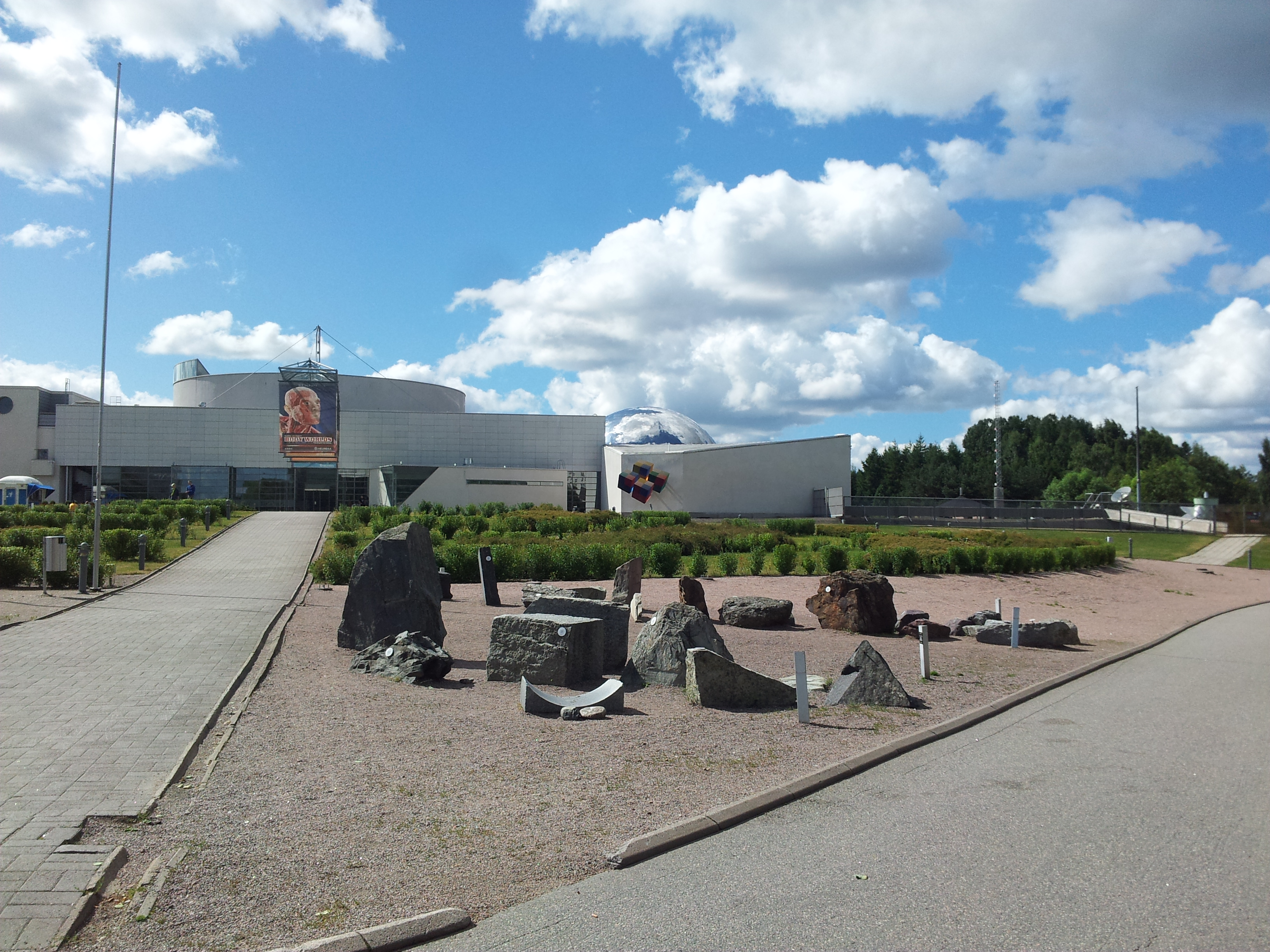
- Location: Tikkurila, Vantaa, Finland
- Type: science museum
- Website: Official website

Heureka is a science center in the Tikkurila district of Vantaa, Finland, north of Helsinki, designed by Heikkinen – Komonen Architects. It is located at the intersection of the Finnish Main Line and the river Keravanjoki.

The aim of the science centre, which opened its doors to the public in 1989, is to popularise scientific information and to develop the methods used to teach science and scientific concepts. The science centre provides opportunities to become familiar with science and technology through varying exhibitions, a planetarium, an idea workshop, educational programs and events. Heureka is one of the largest leisure centres in Finland, with about 300 thousand visitors per year.

The name "Heureka" (eureka in English) refers to the Greek exclamation, presumably uttered by Archimedes, to mean "I've found it!" (made a discovery). The Science Centre Heureka features both indoor and outdoor interactive exhibitions with exhibits that enable visitors to independently test different concepts and ideas. There is also a digital planetarium with 135 seats.

The Heureka Science Centre is a non-profit organization run by the Finnish Science Centre Foundation. The Finnish Science Centre Foundation is a broadly based co-operation organization that includes the Finnish scientific community, education sector, trade and industry, and national and local government. The ten background organisations of the Foundation support, develop and actively participate in the activities of Heureka. The foundation's highest body is the Board of Trustees, whose decisions are implemented by the Governing Board. Everyday activities are the responsibility of Heureka's director assisted by a management team and other staff. Since September 2020, the director of Heureka has been Mikko Myllykoski.

== History ==
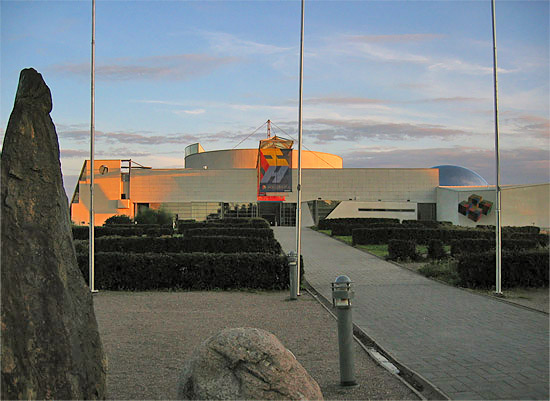
The Heureka science center

The roots of the Finnish Science Centre Heureka can be traced back to the University of Helsinki and scientists, who had become acquainted with different science centres located around the world. The initial spark was lit by Adjunct Professors Tapio Markkanen, Hannu I. Miettinen and Heikki Oja. It all began with the Physics 82 exhibition held at the House of the Estates in Helsinki on 20–26 May 1982. During autumn of that same year, the science centre project was launched with the initial support of the Academy of Finland, the Ministry of Education, and various foundations. The project led to the establishment of the Finnish Science Centre Foundation during 1983-1984. The original founding members of the foundation included the University of Helsinki, the Helsinki University of Technology, the Federation of Finnish Learned Societies, and the Confederation of Industries.

In 1984, the City of Vantaa offered to be the host city and partial financier for the Science Centre, and also designated a property lot located in the southern end of Tikkurila as the future site of the centre. The total cost of the building was 80 million Finnish markka, or about 13.5 million euro. An architectural competition, held in 1985, turned out two first prizes from which the winning design was selected; namely the "Heureka" design submitted by Mikko Heikkinen, Markku Komonen and Lauri Anttila.

Before the building was completed, a number of test exhibitions were set up at other sites: Fysiikka -82 at the House of Estates, the medical exhibition Pulssi at the Tali tennis centre in spring 1985, Vipunen about the Finnish people and language at the House of Estates in autumn 1985, the aquatic exhibition AQUA 86 at Messukeskus Helsinki in spring 1986 and the technical and scientific exhibition Teknorama at Messukeskus Helsinki in spring 1987. The interior plan for the Science Centre was completed in 1986. The foundation for the building was laid in October 1987, and the construction work was completed one year later. The overall area of the building is 8,200 m², of which 2,800 m² is exhibition space. The Finnish Science Centre Heureka opened its doors to the public on 28 April 1989.

== Building ==
The building consists of an auditorium, meeting rooms, a planetarium, a restaurant and a shop. The facade of the building facing the railway track makes use of mirror glass, intended to shield the building from the noise caused by the trains. The structures in the facade are phased into 31 parts of a whole of a hundred metres of length, with the corresponding spectral colours based on a laboratory analysis and special paints made based on it. The coating of the outer walls of the pillar hall uses pretensed white concrete slabs one inch thick. The shell elements have been sandblasted on their surface and are 60 × 120 cm in area.

The central inner space and architectural focus point of the science centre is its 14-metre-tall cylindrical exhibition hall. The pillar module of the main exhibition space is 9.6 metres in both height and width. Its pillars consist of sub-pillars, with four in the central area, two on each edge and one in each corner. This structure is intended to visualise the relative distribution of load.

The main exhibition space is surrounded by the pillar hall and an arc hall supported by laminated beam arcs. The sphere of the planetarium and the sector-shaped auditorium intersect and enter into the modular pillar hall, and partly into each other. Each part of the building is fitted with a structural system developed specifically for it. In terms of structures and materials, the science centre is a kind of a conglomeration. It contains concrete, steel and wood constructs. The building has mostly been built from pre-built components, but it also contains some parts built in place.

The base floor of the exhibition spaces contains a semi-heated service space for the building services engineering elements needed by the exhibition. The outlets and connection possibilities have been systematically placed in a 2.4 metre grid into the entire building. This allows for enough flexibility to host exhibitions.

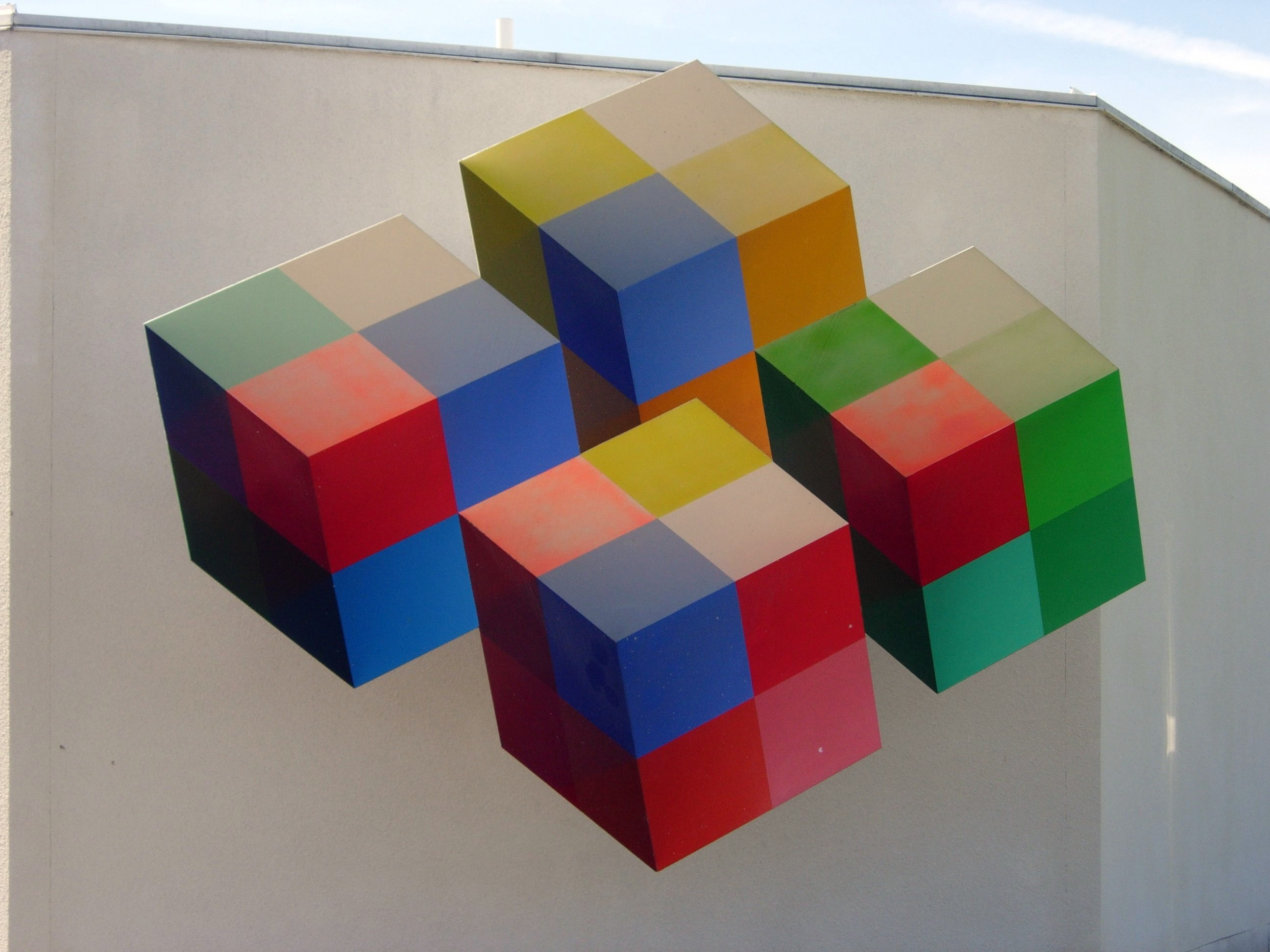
The symbol of Heureka, Neljä kuutiota ("Four cubes"), is an optical illusion appearing to be a group of cubes

=== Interior ===
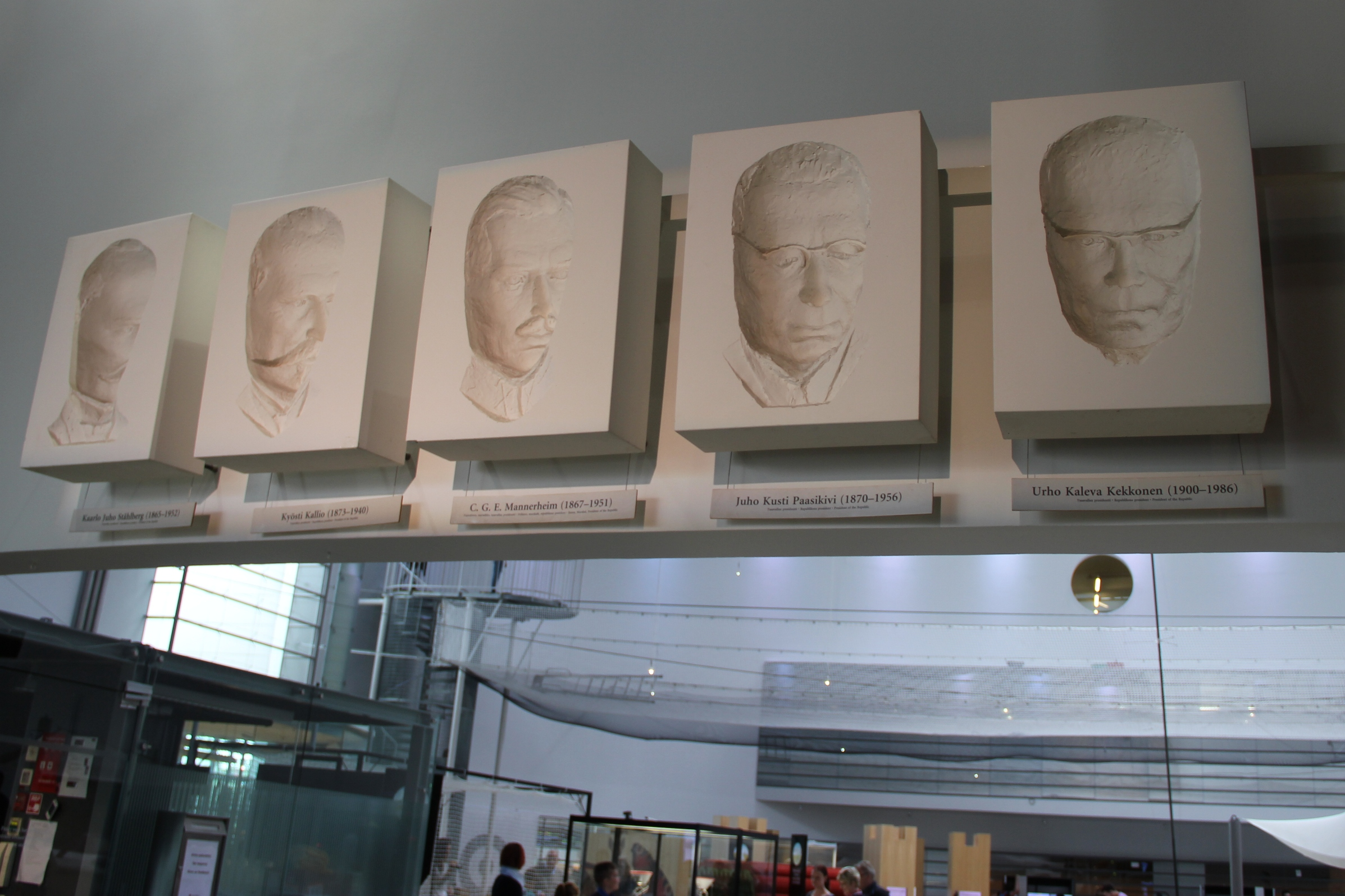
The faces of the presidents of Finland appear to turn when walking past them.

The cylindrical main exhibition hall was inspired by an exhibition designed by Gunnar Asplund at the Stockholm city library and houses about 200 exhibits related to different fields of science. Stable exhibits in the area include a Foucault pendulum and a wire wheel at the ceiling. The content of the main exhibition is renewed every couple of years.

The main exhibition was renewed completely in 1999, but there are small changes taking place in the main exhibition hall each year as well. The cylindrical main exhibition hall houses many exhibits related to various fields of science. The topics include, for example, digestion and the functions of the intestines, the production of money and traffic. The exhibition "The Wind in the Bowels" has been designed in co-operation with the Finnish Medical Society Duodecim. The exhibition "About a Coin" was implemented through collaboration with the Mint of Finland to mark the company's 150th anniversary. The exhibition Intelligent City is about utilising information technology in improving the functionality, safety, energy effectiveness and environmental friendliness of a city.

As an extension of the main exhibition, the Heureka Classics exhibition was opened in 2009 in honour of Heureka's 20th anniversary, and hosts a collection of favourites both from Heureka and from other science centres. The exhibition shows various prominent physical phenomena, which can be experienced by the entire body. Illusion exhibits show how the cooperation between the brain and the senses create amazing phenomena inside our heads. From the beginning of August 2009, Heureka has also had the Science on a Sphere exhibit on display. This exhibit is a large sphere created by the American National Oceanic and Atmospheric Administration (NOAA), with various demonstrations of the climate, the oceans, the landmasses and astronomical objects projected on its surface.

In addition to the main exhibition, Heureka generally also houses two temporary exhibitions. The topics of past temporary exhibitions have included, for example, dinosaurs, humans, sports, forests, the art of film, flying and ancient cultures. Since Heureka's opening, the most successful exhibitions have been the dinosaur exhibitions. The 2001 exhibition about the family life of dinosaurs, for example, attracted 406,000 visitors. Many of the exhibitions independently produced by Heureka have made guest appearances in numerous science centres all over the world. Heureka also features exhibitions imported from abroad.

=== Outdoor areas ===
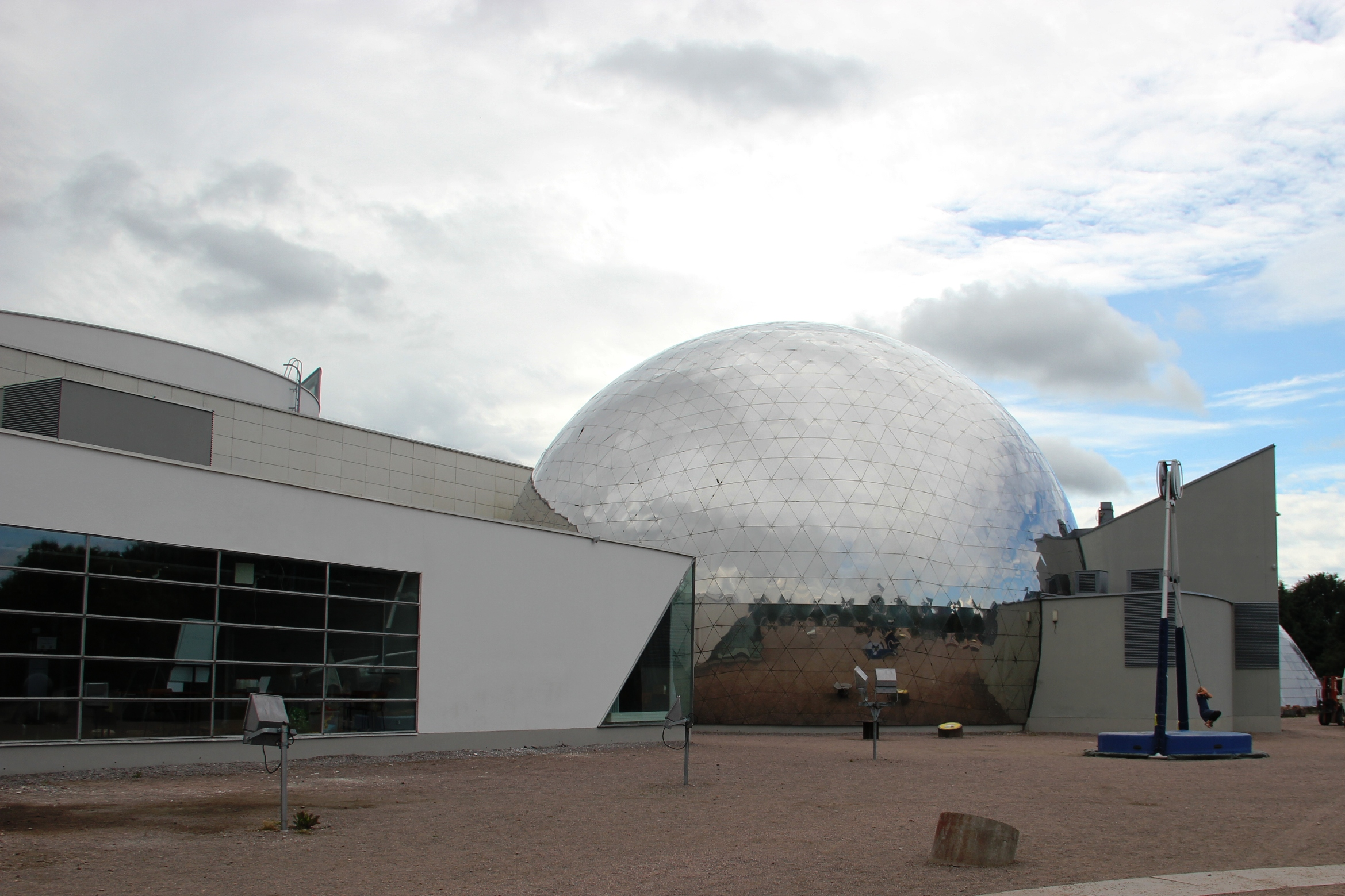
Science Park Galilei and the exterior of the planetarium at the science centre Heureka.

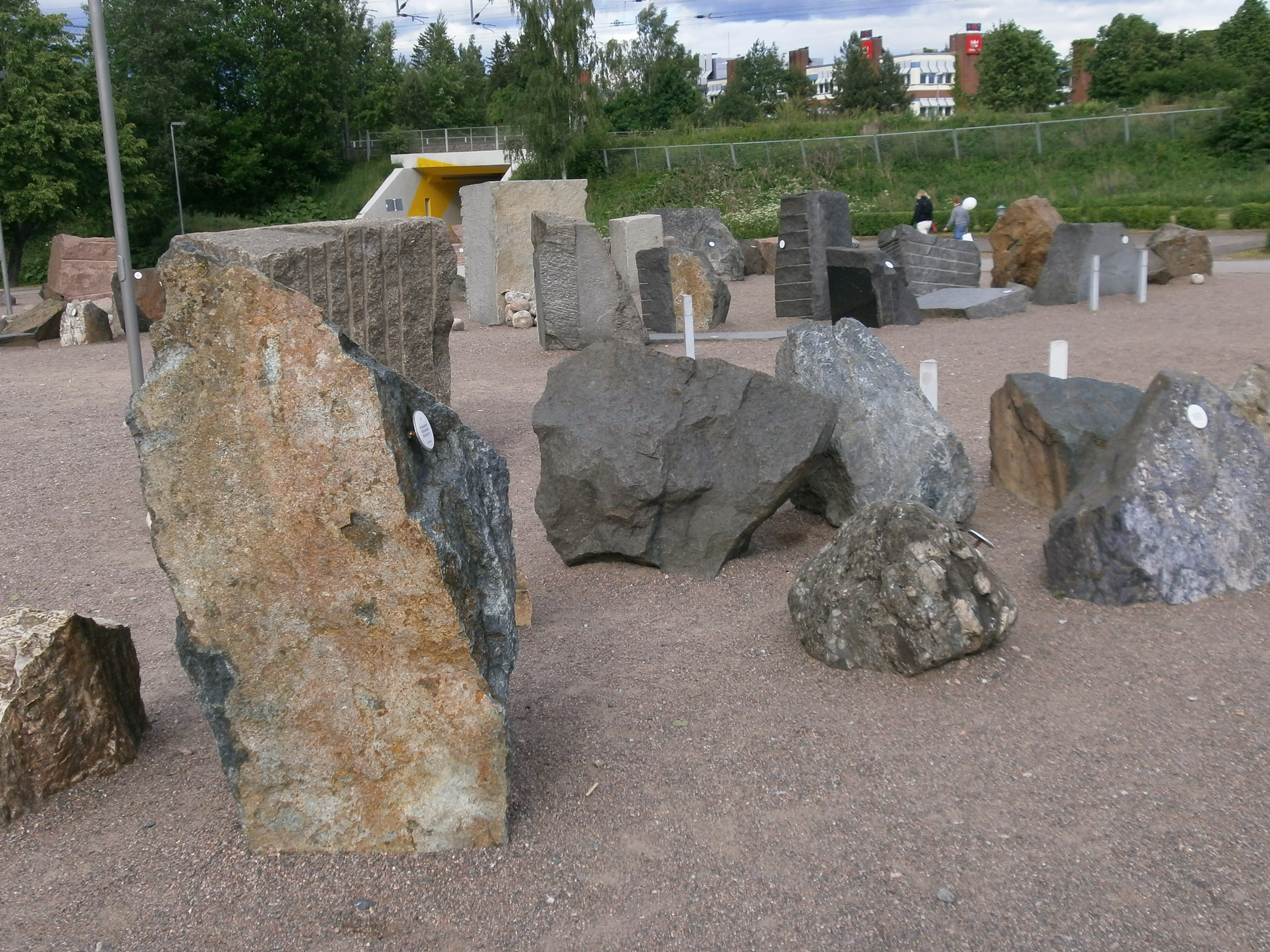
The bedrock exhibition.

Heureka's outdoor exhibition area, Science Park Galilei, opened in 2002. This area of the centre can be visited annually during the summer season. Galilei is a sort of "scientific playground". The 7,500 m² area holds dozens of exhibits, many of which feature water as the primary element. The exhibits are based on mathematical, physical and musical phenomena. The outdoor park also contains moving works of art, such as the sand plotter created by well-known Finnish artist Osmo Valtonen. Galilei also features an arboretum with species of conifers from the northern hemisphere.

The area in front of Heureka features a permanent bedrock exhibition, which contains both common and rare types of rocks found in Finland's bedrock. The rocks are situated to reflect their distribution throughout different geographical provinces of Finland. The purpose of the bedrock exhibition is to show visitors of the science centre that the message of the science centre is not limited to technical achievements, but also extends to the long cycle of nature and culture. Leading up to the front entrance, visitors are also greeted by perennial gardens that were planted in accordance with the historical classification system designed by Carolus Linnaeus. The front of the entrance is tiled in Penrose tiling.

=== Planetarium ===
The hemispheric-shaped planetarium primarily presents films dealing with astronomy. Until 2007, the theatre was called the Verne Theatre, and it ran super films and multimedia programmes made with special slide projectors that took advantage of the entire 500 m² surface of the hemispheric screen. At the end of 2007, the theatre was entirely renovated; the digital Sky Skan equipment of the current planetarium allows for projecting moving images to the entire surface of the hemispheric screen. The planetarium also has a traditional star sky projector for special programs. There are altogether 135 seats in Heureka's planetarium, and it is often used for planetarium films with an outer space theme.

=== Other daily programmes ===
In addition to the exhibitions and planetarium films, Heureka also offers the opportunity to view daily science theatre shows, to participate in supervised programmes and to watch basketball games played by rats. Furthermore, a number of other individual events, such as Science Days, science holidays and science camps in the summer are organised at Heureka. Public lectures with different themes are also regularly held in Heureka's auditorium. Public lectures are given in the planetarium as well. Other services at Heureka include a science shop and a restaurant, as well as conference facilities and a 220-seat auditorium for meetings.

== Visitors ==
From 1989 to 2011, an average of about 285,000 people have visited Heureka each year. The total number of visitors exceeded six million in May 2010. From spring 1989 to the end of 2020 over 8.9 million people have visited Heureka. Altogether almost 29 million people have viewed Heureka's exhibitions on display both in Finland and abroad.

Of the average 285,000 people who visit Heureka each year, more than half represent families, one fourth school students, about 10% are corporate visits, and the rest are individual visitors. About 6-10% of the visitors arrive from abroad, with the highest percentage coming from Russia and Estonia. The number of visitors is affected by, for example, the general economic situation, the weather and the excursion funds available to school groups.

In 2019 a total of 423,229 people visited Heureka, thanks to the popular Giant Dinosaurs exhibition. Because of the lock-down caused by the COVID-19 pandemic, the number of visitors in 2020 was only 165,428. Heureka's most active year was its inaugural year 1989, when 431,244 people visited the science centre in a bit over eight months.

In terms of number of visitors, Heureka is one of the most popular for-pay attractions in Finland, and it has been the most popular museum in Finland on many years. When the science centre was originally being planned in the 1980s, it was estimated to attract 250,000 people per year. The long-time average has risen slightly higher than this estimate, to about 280,000 visitors per year. The number of visitors varies considerably each year because of the services offered and the economic situation of Heureka and its competitors, which affects the demand for various visitor groups and consumption decisions.

== The Finnish Science Centre Foundation and funding ==
Heureka is run by the Finnish Science Centre Foundation, whose original members include the University of Helsinki, the Helsinki University of Technology (nowadays Aalto University), the Federation of Finnish Learned Societies, and the Confederation of Industries (nowadays Confederation of Finnish Industries, EK), the City of Vantaa, the Ministry of Education (nowadays Ministry of Education and Culture), the Ministry of Trade and Industry (nowadays Ministry of Employment and the Economy), the Ministry of Finance, the Central Organisation of Finnish Trade Unions (SAK), and the Trade Union of Education in Finland (OAJ).

Heureka's funding is provided through subsidies from the City of Vantaa and the Ministry of Education and Culture, as well as through its own operational revenue: admission and rental fees, fundraising and exhibition export. Heureka's overall funding is approximately ten million euro, of which the revenue from own operations is about one half. The share of the funding provided by the City of Vantaa and the Ministry of Education and Culture amounts to the other half. The public support is notably less than for many other cultural institutions. Part of the funding also comes through corporate co-operation. The temporary exhibitions are often sponsored by main partners and other partners. Heureka also has two companies owned entirely by the Foundation, namely the Science Shop Magneetti Oy, which runs the Heureka Shop at Heureka and at the Kamppi Center in central Helsinki, and Heureka Overseas Productions Oy Ltd, which manages the export activities of Heureka.

== Leadership ==
Professor Per-Edvin Persson served as the president of Heureka from 1991 to until his retirement in 2013, where he was replaced by Anneli Pauli. Tapio Koivu started as the president of Heureka in August 2014. Mikko Myllykoski was chosen as the president of Heureka in September 2020, having previously served as the experience director of Heureka for many years.

The foundation had a staff of 60 to 70 full-time salaried employees and 20 to 40 part-time or fixed-term employees. The total number of person-years has varied between 70 and 80. Additionally 7 206 hours were carried out by volunteers. There have been volunteers in Heureka since 1998, and there are currently about 60-70 volunteers in the service of Heureka.

The center is a member of three associations of science centers:

- ASTC (Association of Science-Technology Centers)
- ECSITE (The European Collaborative for Science, Industry and Technology)
- NSCF (Nordisk Science Centerförbundet)

The Science Centre Foundation has donated the office of a director of science centre pedagogics to the department of applied education science at the faculty of behavioural sciences of the University of Helsinki, with the chief of research and development of Heureka, professor Hannu Salmi elected to the position

== See also ==
- List of science centers

== Sources ==
- Douglas E. Graf, "Heureka: Formal Analysis", Datutop 18, Tampere, 1996.
