= Nordic Science Centre Association =

The Nordic Science Centre Association (NSCA – also known as NSCF, abbreviated from the Swedish name Nordisk Science Center Forbund) was established in a meeting in Finland in October 1987. The first chairman of NSCF was Per-Edvin Persson, long-time director of Finnish science centre Heureka. Starting from 2017, the chairman is Hanne Haack Larsen from Experimentarium in Denmark.

NSCF helps to establish the contact between the science centres (i.e. exhibition and activity centres whose goal is the popularisation of science and who aim to teach through interactive exhibits and demonstrations) in Scandinavian and Baltic Countries.

The aim of the association is to encourage the cooperation and the exchange of ideas between its member institutions. Contact and cooperation are facilitated by the annual meetings and the newsletter that is issued five times a year. Several members have also cooperated more closely by exchanging exhibits and exhibitions and participating in pan-European projects. The NSCF Scholarship also allows the science centre staff to travel to other member organizations (for training purposes).

NSCF is an associate member of ECSITE, the European Network of Science Centres and Museums.

== Governing board ==
The association is led by a governing board that is re-elected in every two years. From 2015 to 2017, it consists of the following members:

- Hanne Haack Larsen (Chairman), Experimentarium, Denmark
- Pilvi Kolk, AHHAA, Estonia
- Tove Marienborg, Nordnorsk Vitensenter, Norway
- Pauls Irbins, ZINOO, Latvia
- Christine Sundberg Carendi, Svenska Science Centers, Sweden
- Heli Ainola, Heureka, Finland
- Guðrún J. Bachmann, University of Iceland, Iceland

== Members ==
In order to become a member of NSCF, an organisation must comply with the charters of NSCF, submit a written application to the board and pay the membership fee. After that, membership has to be confirmed by voting at the next General Council (the annual meeting).

Currently, NSCF has members from Finland, Sweden, Norway, Denmark, Iceland, Estonia and Latvia. The full list of members is updated four times a year and can be found here.

=== Honorary members ===
At the board meeting in February 2016, the NSCF governing board decided to create the status of honorary membership and nominate the first two honorary members for their active participation and long-standing support for the collaboration between Nordic and Baltic states. The honorary members of NSCF are Per Edwin Persson, the first chairman of NSCF and a winner of the NSCF award, and Asger Høeg, who has been a member of the NSCF governing board for many years.
