= Adalbert Wirkhaus =

Estonian conductor and composer

Adalbert Wirkhaus (17 May 1880 Väägvere, Sootaga Parish, Tartu County – 19 December 1961 Fort Lauderdale, Florida) was an Estonian composer and conductor. He was the first Estonian professional conductor.

== Life ==
Wirkhaus' father was the musician and Estonian social movement figure David Otto Wirkhaus. In 1908, he graduated from Leipzig Conservatory in conducting and in composition speciality.

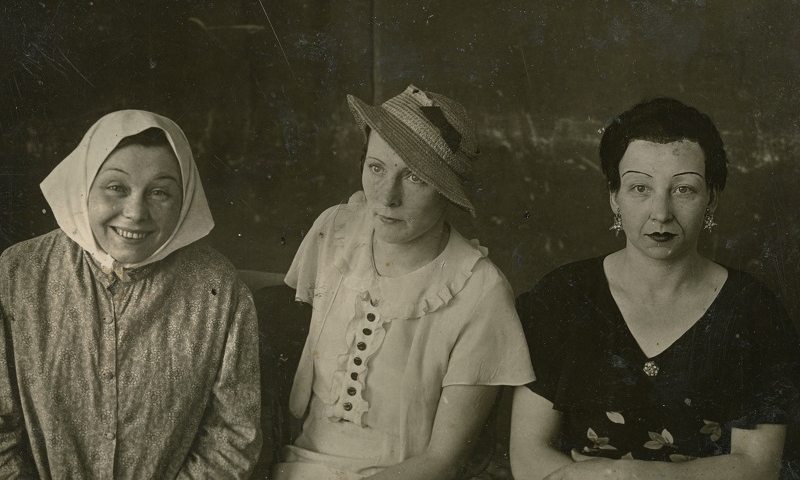
Ida Suvero, Elvi Nander and Linda Tubin while appearing in Wirkhaus's Kevadtormid in 1934

From 1908 to 1912, he was a music director of the Estonia Theatre. 1912–1917, he was a music director of Valga Säde Society. In 1919, he founded (with August Nieländer) Tartu Music School.

In 1944, he fled with his family from the advancing Red Army to Germany. Since 1949, he lived in Fort Lauderdale, USA. His son was the composer and conductor Taavo Virkhaus and his nephew was the composer, choir director and organist Leonhard Virkhaus.

== Works ==
- Jaaniöö (Midsummer Night, 1911), the first Estonian operetta
- Kevadtormid (Spring Storms, 1934), operetta
