= Taavo Virkhaus =

Estonian-American conductor and composer (1934–2021)

Taavo Virkhaus (29 June 1934 – 10 February 2021) was an Estonian-American conductor, composer, and violinist.

== Biography ==
Virkhaus was born on 29 June 1934, in Tartu, Estonia. He was the son of conductor-composer Adalbert Virkhaus and Helene Virkhaus (née Sild). Adalbert is said to be Estonia's first professional conductor, having studied with Arthur Nikisch and Max Reger at Leipzig. Virkhaus's grandfather, David Otto Virkhaus, was a composer regarded as the father of Estonian band music.

Virkhaus attended elementary school at Tartu Teachers' Seminary, and showed musical talent at a young age. At the age of four, he appeared as a "guest conductor" for a summer community band, reportedly delighting the audience. He began playing piano before he could read music, and would listen in on his sister's piano lessons, sometimes learning by ear the repertoire she was taught. During World War II, Soviet forces occupied Estonia and began political repression of suspected dissidents. One day in 1944, Virkhaus's father was warned by a former student that the Soviets were planning a mass deportation, and his family might be among those targeted. The Virkhaus family then fled to the countryside, and from there to refugee camps throughout Europe. They were subsequently able to emigrate to the United States, after Adalbert was offered a job in Fort Lauderdale, Florida, in 1949.

While taking refuge with his family throughout Europe, Taavo made time to study the violin, practicing repertoire that his father wrote down from memory. After moving to the United States, Virkhaus attended and graduated from Fort Lauderdale High School, and earned a violin scholarship to the University of Miami, where he graduated with honors. He spent three summers at the Tanglewood festival, receiving instruction from Pierre Monteux and Seymour Lipkin. He attended the Eastman School of Music, earning master's and doctoral degrees in conducting and composition. During his graduate studies, Virkhaus taught strings in the Penfield, NY school district and conducted the Penfield Community Orchestra (now the Penfield Symphony).

In 1966, after defending his doctorate, Virkhaus was named to the faculty of Eastman, where he taught conducting and served as Director of Music at the University of Rochester. In 1977, he was named music director of the Duluth Superior Symphony Orchestra in Duluth, Minnesota, where he served until 1994. From 1989 until 2003, he was the music director of the Huntsville Symphony Orchestra in Huntsville, Alabama.

Virkhaus was an active composer, with a body of work including six symphonies, two violin concertos, and a number of solo and chamber works. He guest-conducted orchestras throughout the United States, Canada, and Russia, including the Baltimore Symphony Orchestra, with whom he premiered his own First Symphony, and gave the American premiere of Eduard Tubin's Ninth Symphony. In 1987, he conducted the Toronto Symphony Orchestra in a program of all Estonian composers, including works by Rudolf Tobias, Eduard Tubin, and Arvo Pärt. Virkhaus made several return trips to Estonia over the course of his career. In 1978, he was invited by fellow Estonian conductor Neeme Järvi to conduct the Estonian National Symphony Orchestra, and guest-conducted that ensemble frequently on future return trips. He participated in numerous Estonian music festivals, including the Estonian Song Festival, at which he served as chief conductor in 1990. He remained affiliated with the festival until his final appearance, at age 80, in 2014.

In 2009, Virkhaus was awarded the Tartu Medal by his home city.

Virkhaus died from complications of COVID-19 in Huntsville on 10 February 2021, at age 86, during the COVID-19 pandemic in Alabama. He is survived by his wife, Nancy (née Herman), whom he met while teaching conducting at Eastman.

== Selected compositions ==
Orchestral works

- Eight Settings of Choral Amen (1962)
- Tiina Suite (1974), derived from Virkhaus's score to an Estonian film of the same name
- Fanfare ad Astra (The Sky Is Not the Limit) (1998)
- Symphony No. 1 (1975), premiered by Baltimore Symphony Orchestra under composer's baton, 8 July 1976
- Symphony No. 5 "Symphony in E" (1996)
- Symphony No. 6 "The Huntsville Symphony" (2007)

Concertos

- Violin Concerto No. 1 (1965–66)
- Violin Concerto No. 2 (1996), premiered by Stephanie Chase and Huntsville Symphony Orchestra with Carlos Miguel Prieto conducting, 21 March 1998

Chamber music

- Miniature String Quartet (1957)
- Soliloquy for clarinet and strings (1962)
- Caccia for oboe and bassoon (1965)
