= Enel Melberg =

Swedish author and translator (born 1943)

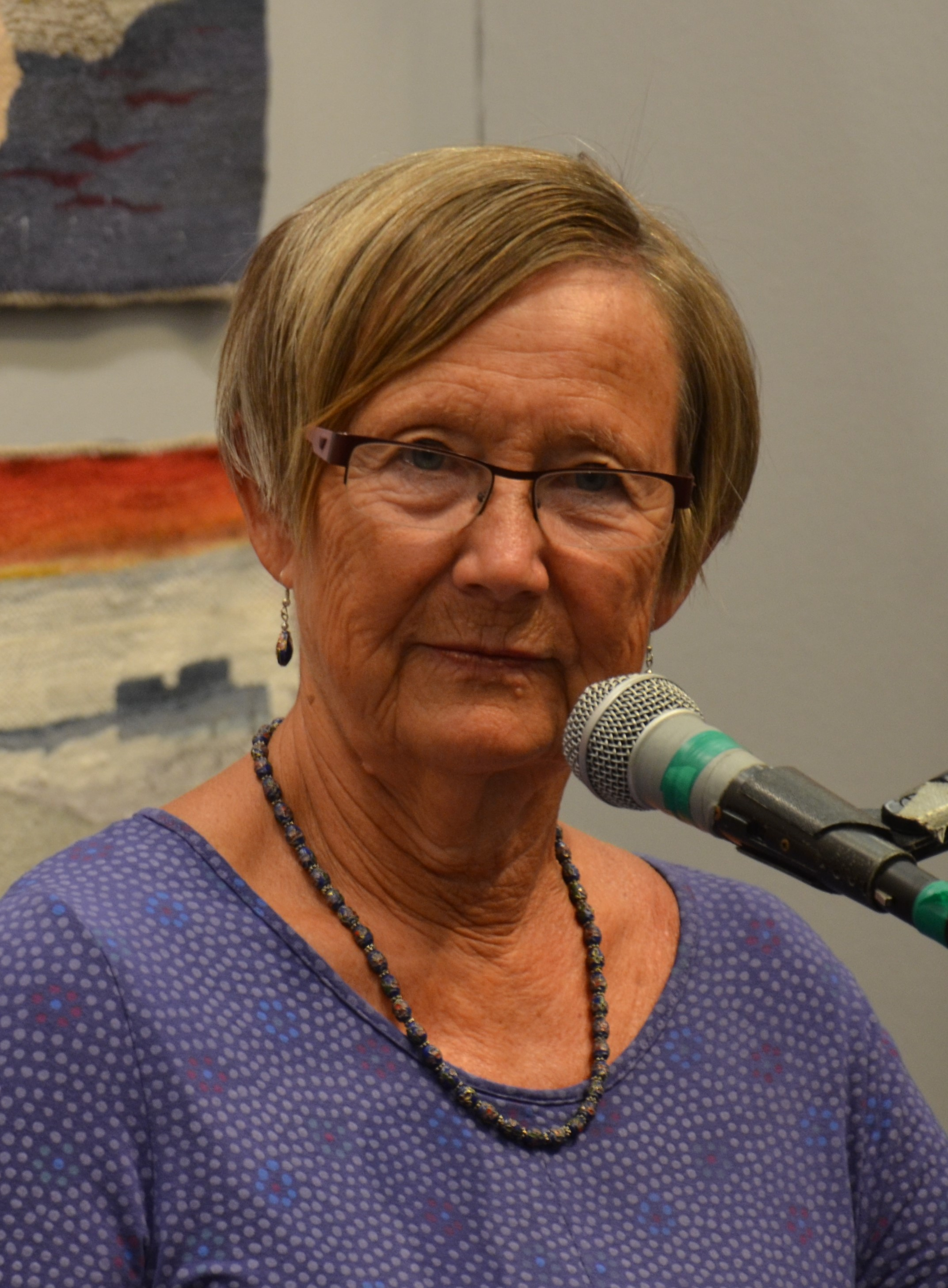
- Melberg in 2014
- Born: Enel Savioja; 1943 (age 82–83); Tallinn, Generalbezirk Estland, Reichskommissariat Ostland
- Alma mater: Lund University
- Spouse: Arne Melberg
- Children: 2
- Writing career
- Years active: 1977–present

Enel Melberg (née Savioja; born 1943) is an Estonian-Swedish author and translator. She made her debut as a novelist in 1977 with Modershjärtat, which dealt with cultural myths about motherhood through a semi-autobiographical and multi-generational narrative. She also translates Estonian to Swedish; she has translated works by Jaan Kaplinski, Tõnu Õnnepalu, and Heinrich Laretei, among others.

== Early life and education ==
Enel Savioja was born in 1943 in Tallinn. Her mother was a teacher and her father was a mechanic. When her father was drafted into the German Army, his placement at a military depot allowed him to secretly arrange transport by boat across the Baltic Sea. Her family came to Sweden in 1944 as refugees, and lived in a number of refugee camps before settling in Tärby outside of Borås. She lived there until she was seven, when the family moved to Gamlestaden, Gothenburg. After graduating from secondary school in Gothenburg, she earned a bachelor's of arts at Lund University.

== Career ==
Melberg made her debut as a novelist in 1977 with Modershjärtat, which dealt with cultural myths about motherhood through a semi-autobiographical and multi-generational narrative. She followed this up in 1978 with Medeas systrar. Her next two novels were Nyckelpiga, flyg and Månbrunnen. In 1989, she published Namn ristat i vatten, a novel structured around the legend of Saint Etheldreda. Set in 7th-century England, the work draws on her life as a princess and later as a nun; the story is presented as an attempt to recover a manuscript about her life attributed to Wilfrid, the bishop who ordained her.

She translated the memoirs of Estonian politician Heinrich Laretei, which were published in Sweden as Ödets leksak in 1992. She translated an epistolary novel by Tõnu Õnnepalu, released in 1995 with a Swedish title of Gränsland. She also translated Ma armastasin venelast by Maimu Berg and Jää ja Titanic by Jaan Kaplinski from Estonian into Swedish; both were published in 1997. She translated another Kaplinski novel, The Same River, which was released in 2009. Her 2012 novel Separator was positively received by Ulf Eriksson in Göteborgs-Posten. The same year, she received the Swedish Academy Translator's Award. She wrote Det borde varit stjärnor (2014), a novel about Swedish poet Gustaf Fröding, told through the perspective of five women in his life.

== Personal life ==
She is married to literature professor Arne Melberg. They lived in Norway for about 20 years, but in 2007 moved to Gräsmark, Värmland. She has two children.

== Selected works ==
- Melberg, Enel (1977). Modershjärtat [Mother's heart] (in Swedish). ISBN 9789151811154.
- — (1978). Medeas systrar [Medea's sisters] (in Swedish). ISBN 9789151811949.
- — (1980). Nyckelpiga, flyg [Ladybug, fly] (in Swedish). ISBN 9789176380000.
- — (1981). Månbrunnen [Moon well] (in Swedish). ISBN 9789176380253.
- — (1989). Namn ristat i vatten [Name carved in water] (in Swedish). ISBN 9789177981886.
- — (2014). Det borde varit stjärnor [It should have been stars] (in Swedish). ISBN 9789186699239.
