= Anne Ormisson =

Estonian medical researcher and physician (1942-)

- Born: Anne Tampere; 19 November 1942 (age 83); Tartu, Estonia
- Scientific career
- Fields: Pediatrics
- Workplaces: University of Tartu; Tartu University Hospital Children's Foundation
- Thesis: The changes in the acid-alkaline balance of children suffering from pneumonia in the conditions of lactic acid milk load Russian: Нагрузка молочной искультой при оченье кабелиция организам к зачастинию аксилдно-челочного развезия крови у детей до двух лет, большый острой певномонией (1975)

Anne Ormisson (until 1967 Anne Tampere, born on 19 November 1942, Tartu) is an Estonian medical researcher and pediatrician.

== Biography ==
Anne Tampere was born on 19 November 1942 in Tartu, Estonia and is the second child of a four-child family of Vanemuine orchestra player Arnold and a music school teacher Helene. She graduated school in 1961 from Tartu 7th Secondary School. She graduated University of Tartu in 1967 and was sent to Võru hospital as a paediatrician. She later moved to Viljandi where she met and married Toivo Ormisson, and her daughter Liis and a son Niil were born. In 1971, she started working as a researcher at the Department of Pediatrics, University of Tartu, and in November 1975, she received the degree of candidate of medicine.

Anne worked as the chief paediatrician of the Tartu Health Department from 1975 to 1979. She became the department assistant of the Department of Pediatrics, University of Tartu, in 1980 while being a doctor in the neonatology at Tartu University Hospital Children's Foundation. She then became an associate professor in 1984. From 1982 to 1992 she was the chief neonatologist of the Ministry of Health.

From 1993 to 1999, Anne Ormisson was the head of the neonatology department of the Tartu Children's Hospital; from 2000 to 2006, the head of the neonatology department of the Children's Clinic of the University of Tartu, and from 2007 to 2011, a physician-consultant at the Children's Clinic of the University of Tartu. Since 2008, she has been an emeritus associate professor and project manager at the University of Tartu.

== Research ==
Areas of research: feeding of newborns and infants, its relationship with the formation and changes of intestinal microflora; pediatric and perinatology healthcare management; morbidity and mortality of infants and newborns, especially premature newborns. Has led several research projects including "Development and health of premature newborns in infancy and early childhood", "Quality evaluation in Estonian perinatal and neonatal medicine" among others, and received grants for them.

From 1995 to 1997, she was the founder and editor-in-chief of the journal Estonian Perinatology Sõnumid, pediatric educational materials and collections of articles, including "Clinical instructions in perinatology" (1997), "Metabolic disorders of newborns". Nearly 100 scientific publications, including two books and teaching aids.

Anne was the president of the Estonian Society of Pediatricians (1990–1994 and 2004–2007), founder and president of the Estonian Society of Perinatology (1995–1999), the vice-president of the Union of European Pediatric Societies (UNEPSA) 1(992–1998), board member of the World Association of Pediatricians (1995–2001), a member of the Board and Journal of the European Association for Pediatric Education (APEE) (1996–2001), a member of the European Society for Paediatric Gastroenterology, a member of the Children's Nutrition Committee of the Nutrition Society (ESPGAN) (1992–1997), a member of the Council of the International Children's Center (ICC) (1999–2003), a member of the Council of the European Academy of Pediatrics (2004–2007), and a member of the international expert council of Türkiye Klinikeri Journal of Medical Sciences until 2007.

== Awards and honours ==
- 1994 Research Award of the Republic of Estonia (collectively)
- 2001 Ihsan Doğramacı Family Health Foundation Fellowship
- 2014 Tartu Medal
- 2018 Order of the Estonian Red Cross, third Class
