= Heikkinen – Komonen Architects =

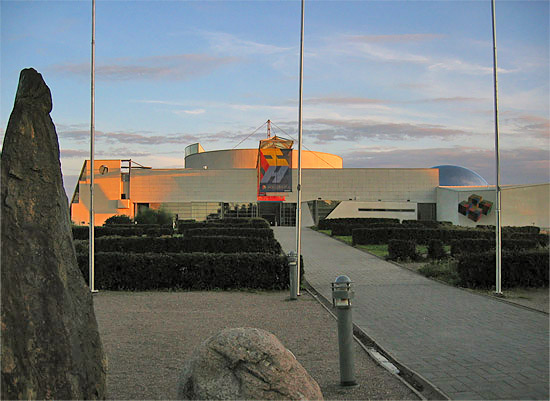
The Heureka Science Centre, Vantaa, 1989

Heikkinen – Komonen Architects is a Finnish architectural firm established by Mikko Heikkinen and Markku Komonen in Helsinki in 1974. Their work is characterised as a fusion between minimalism, high-technology and Abstract expressionism, typified by their design for the Vuotalo Cultural Centre in Helsinki, or the Heureka Science Centre, in Vantaa with the juxtaposition of stark concrete elements against colourful high-tech metal structures and large glazed surfaces. They have also completed a number of small-scale humanitarian projects for Guinea, west Africa, based on local building traditions.

== Main works ==
- Heureka Science Centre, Vantaa, Finland (1989)
- Rovaniemi Airport, Rovaniemi, Finland (1992) (Extension, 2000)
- European Film College, Ebeltoft, Denmark (1993)
- Embassy of Finland, Washington, D.C., United States (1994)
- Elementary School, Boundou Koura, Guinea (1997)
- Elementary School, Madina Kouta, Guinea (1997)
- School for Chicken Farmers, Kindia, Guinea (1999)
- Juminkeko, the Information Centre for Kalevala and Karelian Culture, Kuhmo (1999)
- McDonald's Headquarters and restaurant, Pikku Huopalahti, Helsinki (1999)
- Max Planck Institute for Molecular Cell Biology and Genetics, Dresden, Germany (2000)
- Vuotalo Vuosaari Culture Centre, Helsinki, Finland (2000)
- Mediacenter Lume, Aalto University School of Art and Design, Helsinki, Finland (2000)
- Emergency Services College, Kuopio, Finland (1988–2005)
- Laavu prototype house (2007)
- Hämeenlinna Regional Archive, Hämeenlinna, Finland (2010)
- Flooranaukio Housing, Helsinki (2012)

== Awards ==
- Heinrich Tessenow Medal (2003)
- International Award for Innovative Technology in Architecture, 2nd prize, Venice Biennale, 1990 (Heureka)

== Gallery ==
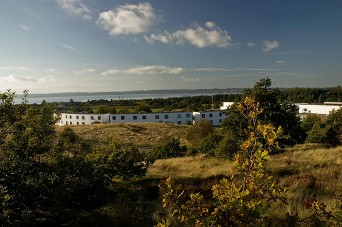
The European Film College, Ebeltoft, Denmark (1993)

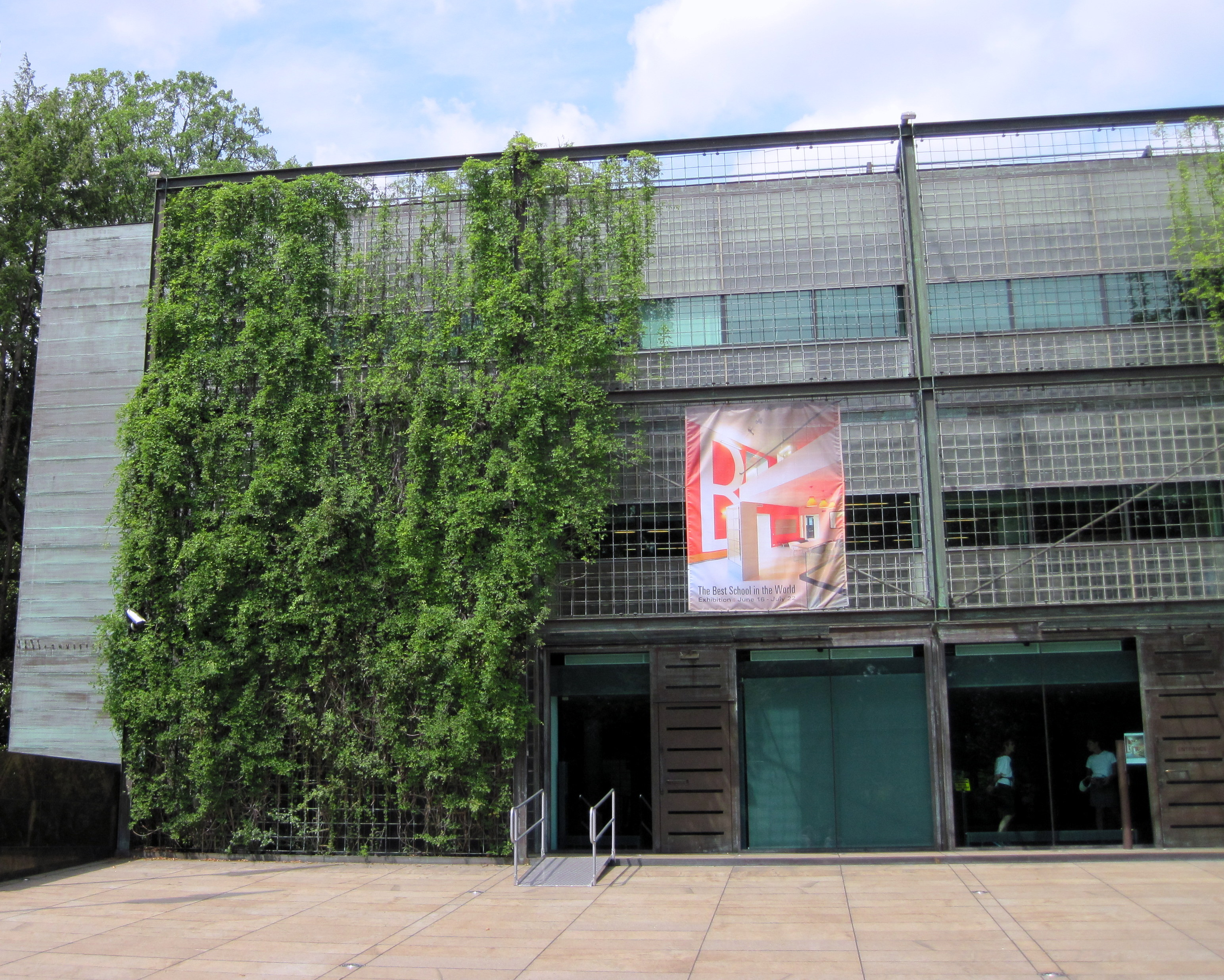
Finnish Embassy, Washington DC, USA (1994)

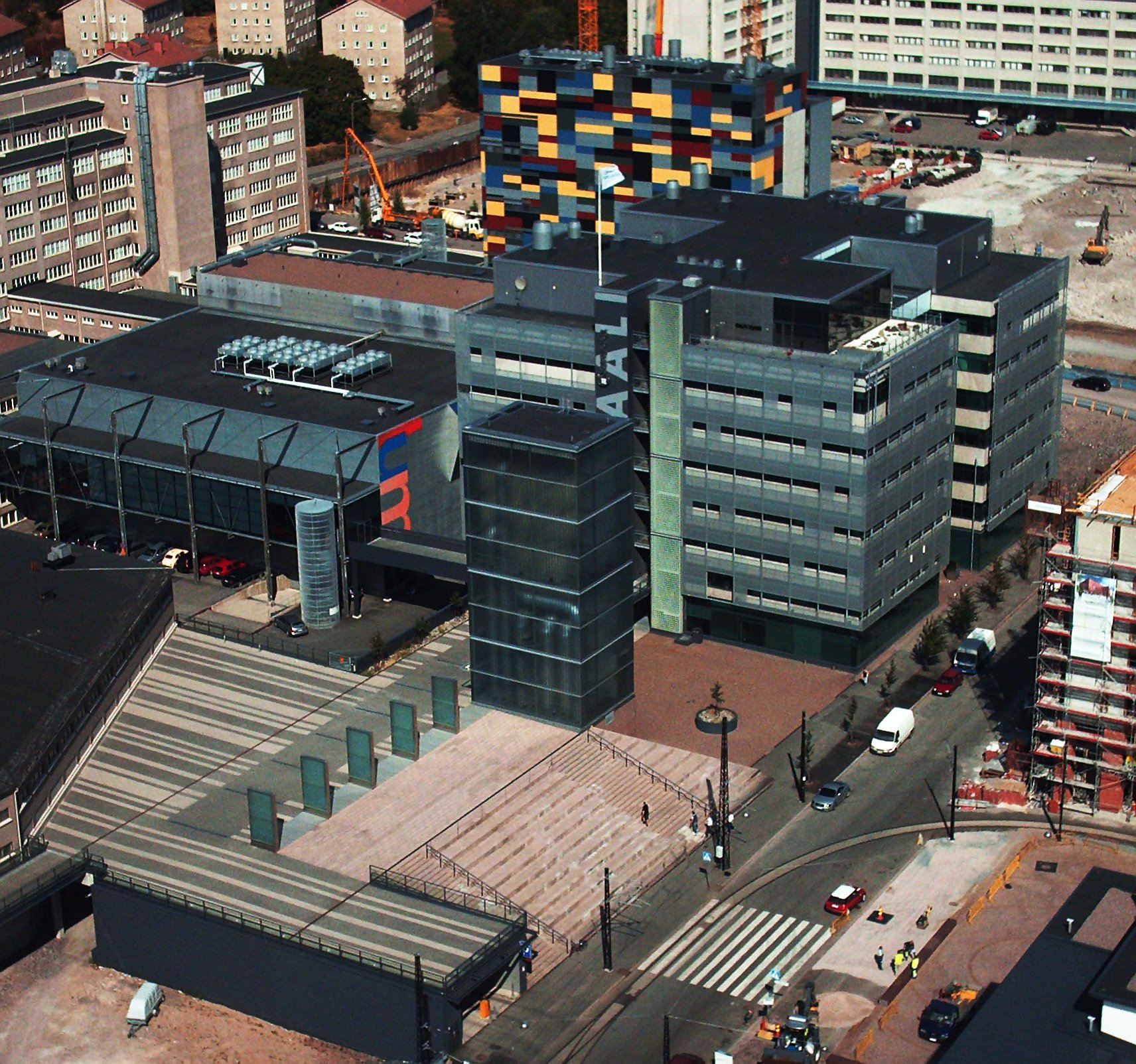
Mediacenter Lume, Aalto University, Helsinki, (2000)

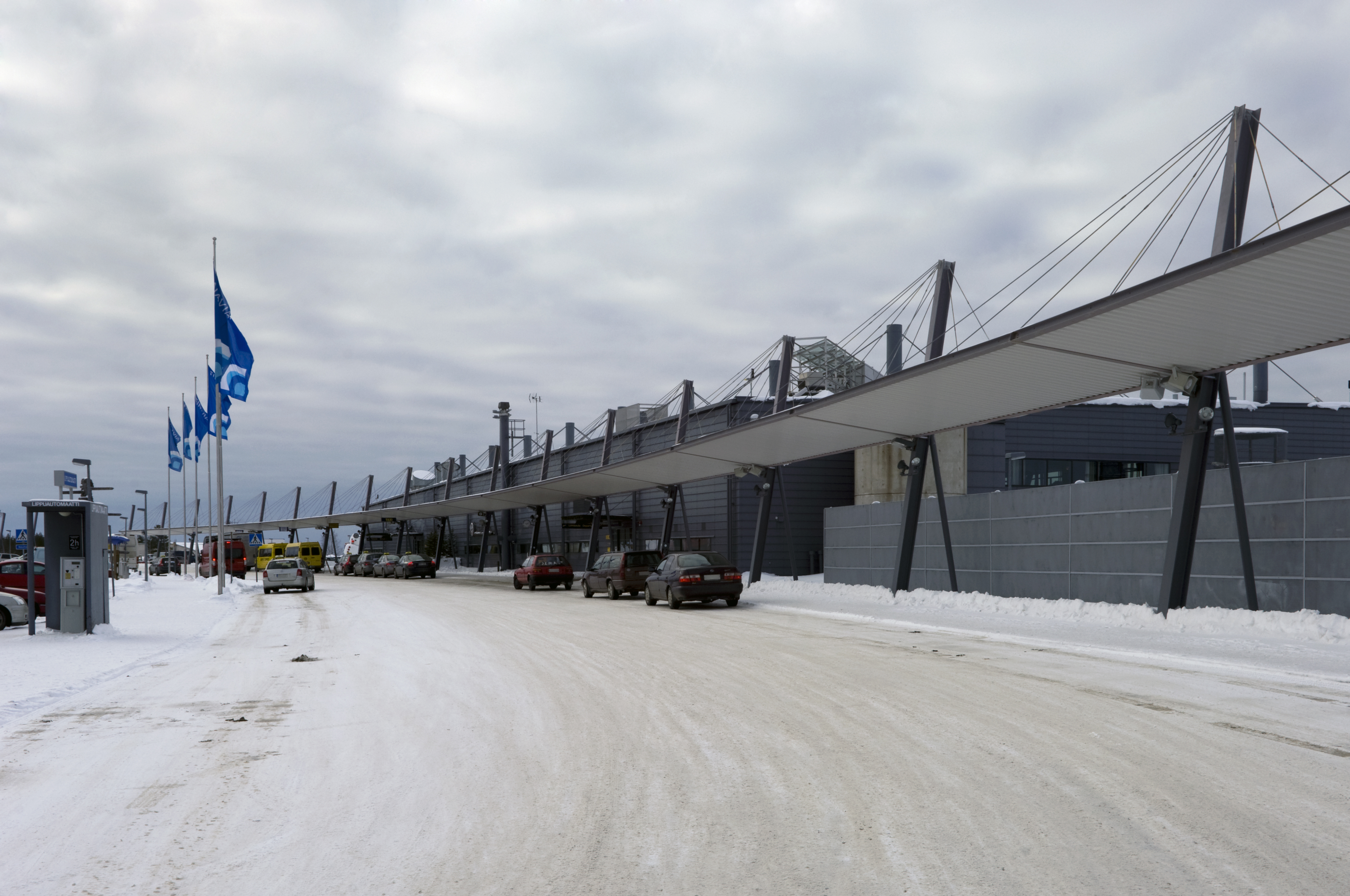
Rovaniemi Airport (2000)

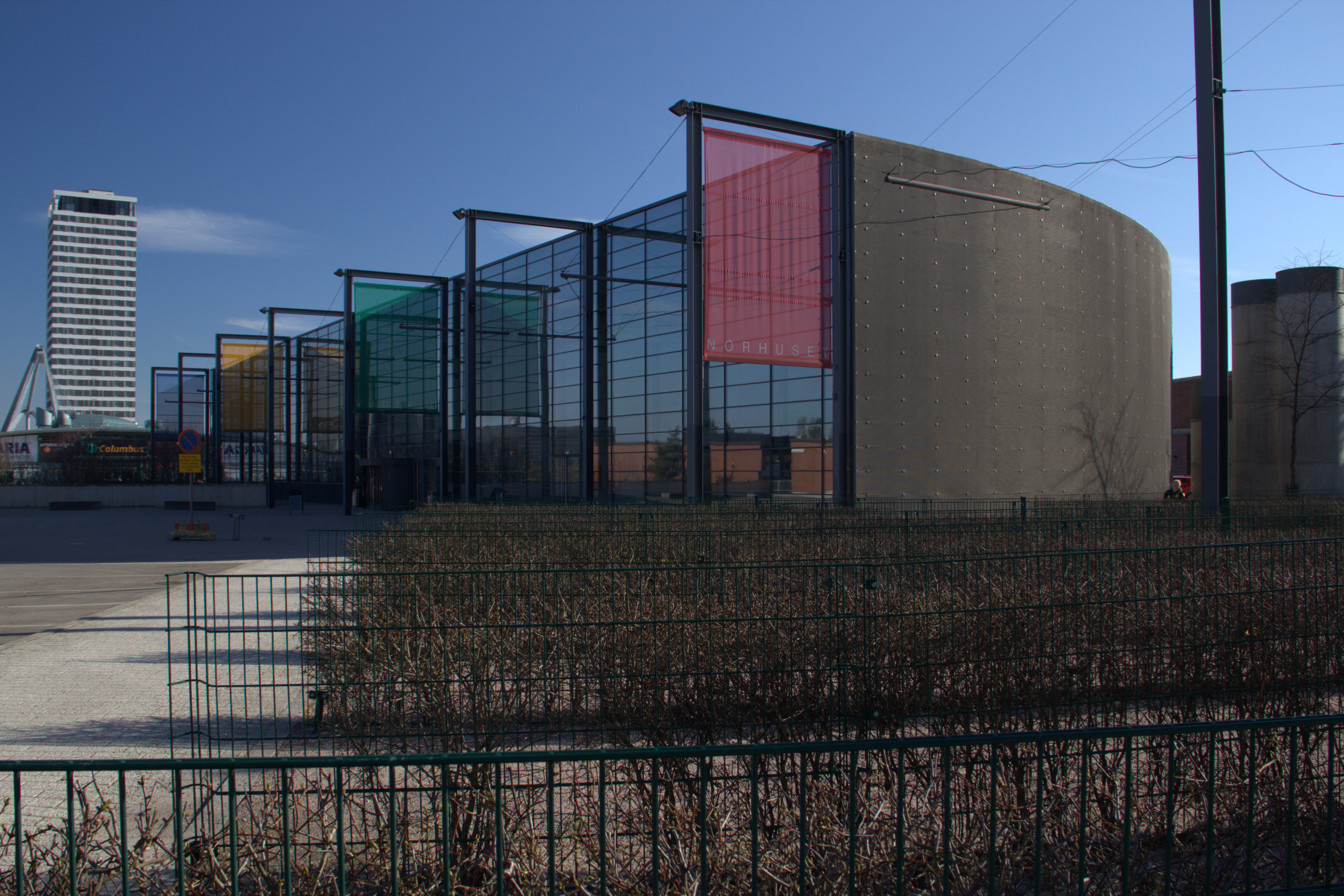
Vuotalo library and culture centre, Vuosaari, Helsinki (2000)

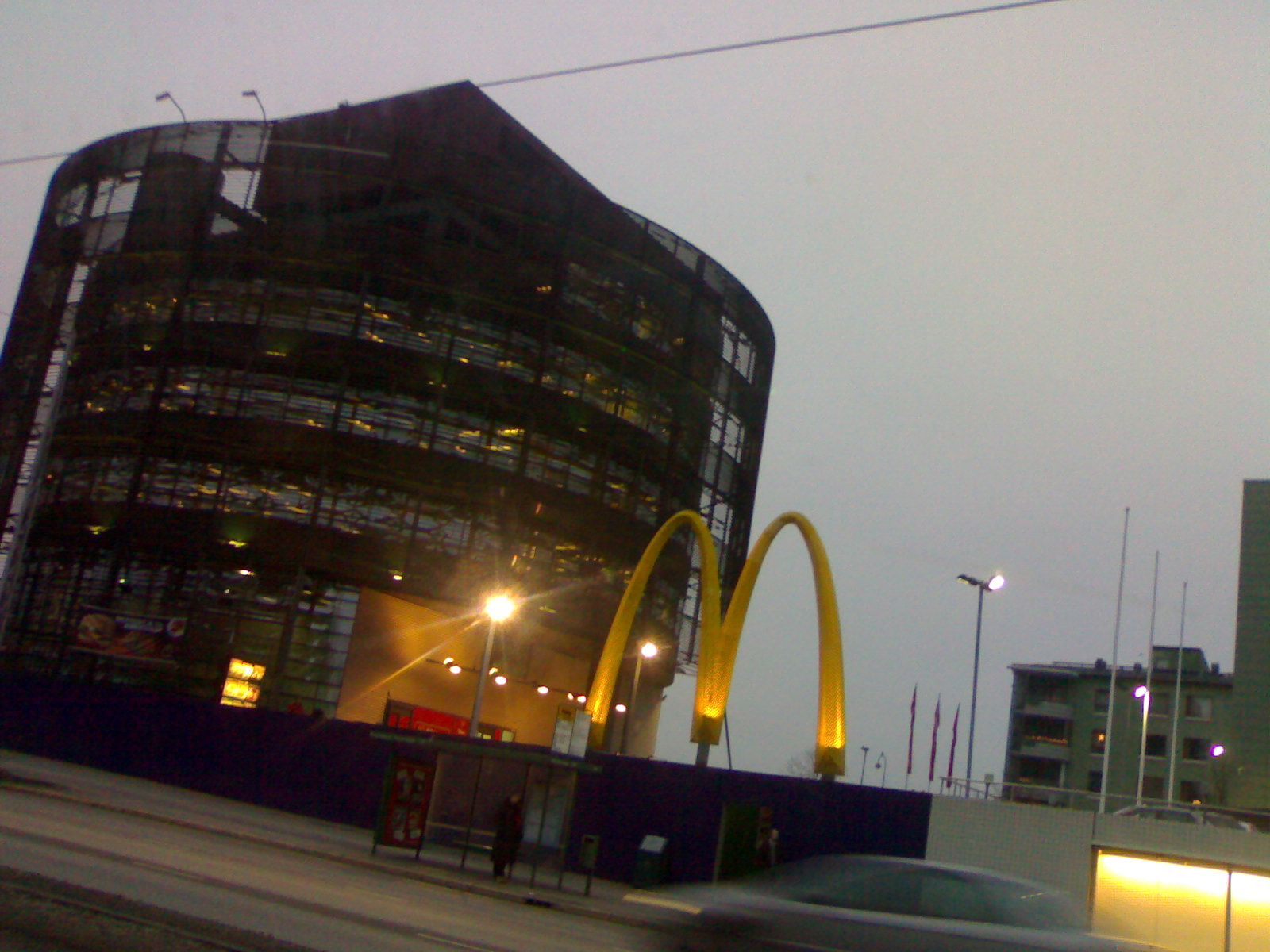
McDonald's HQ, Helsinki (1999)

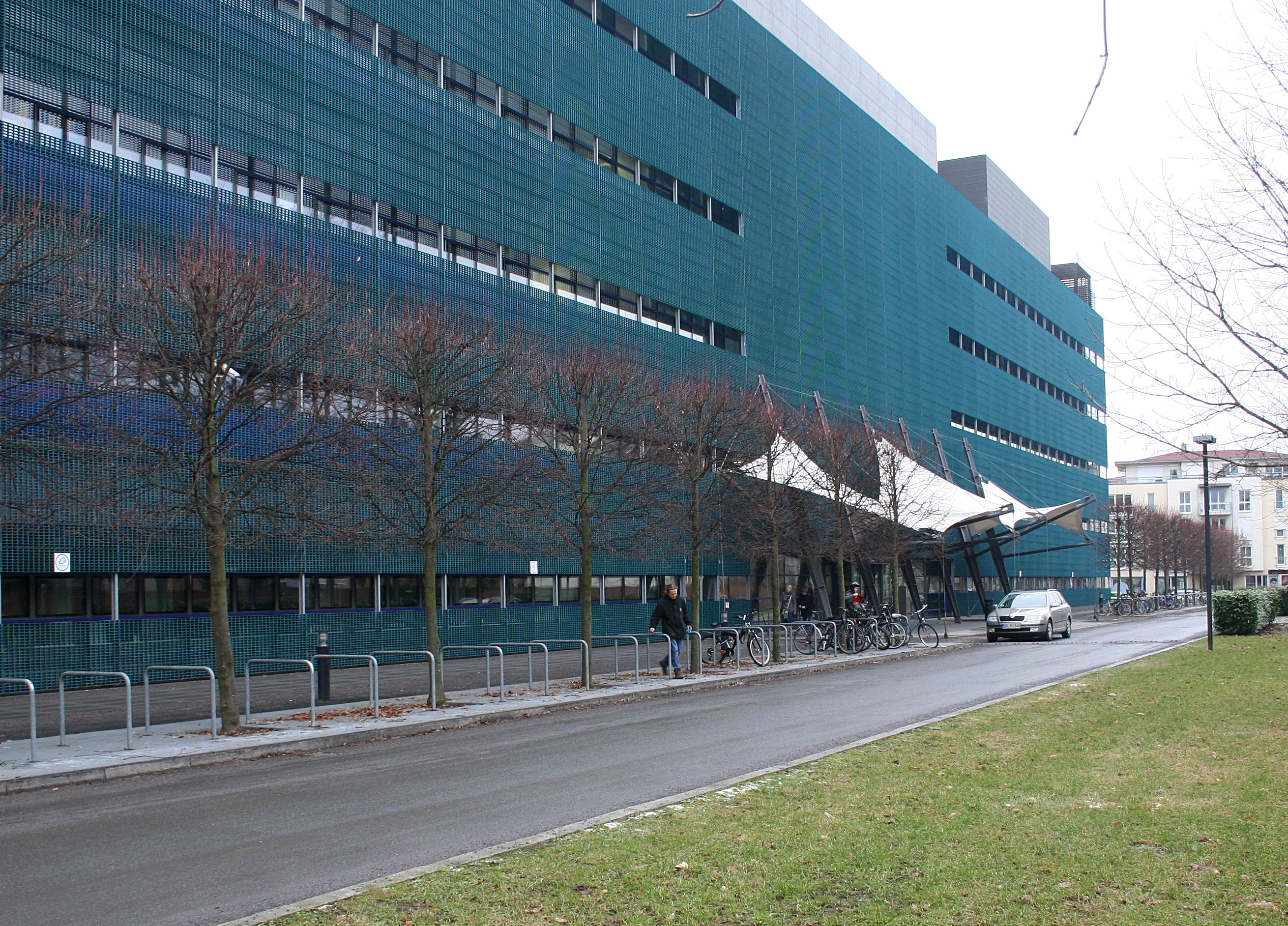
Max Planck Institute for Molecular Cell Biology and Genetics, Dresden, Germany (2001)

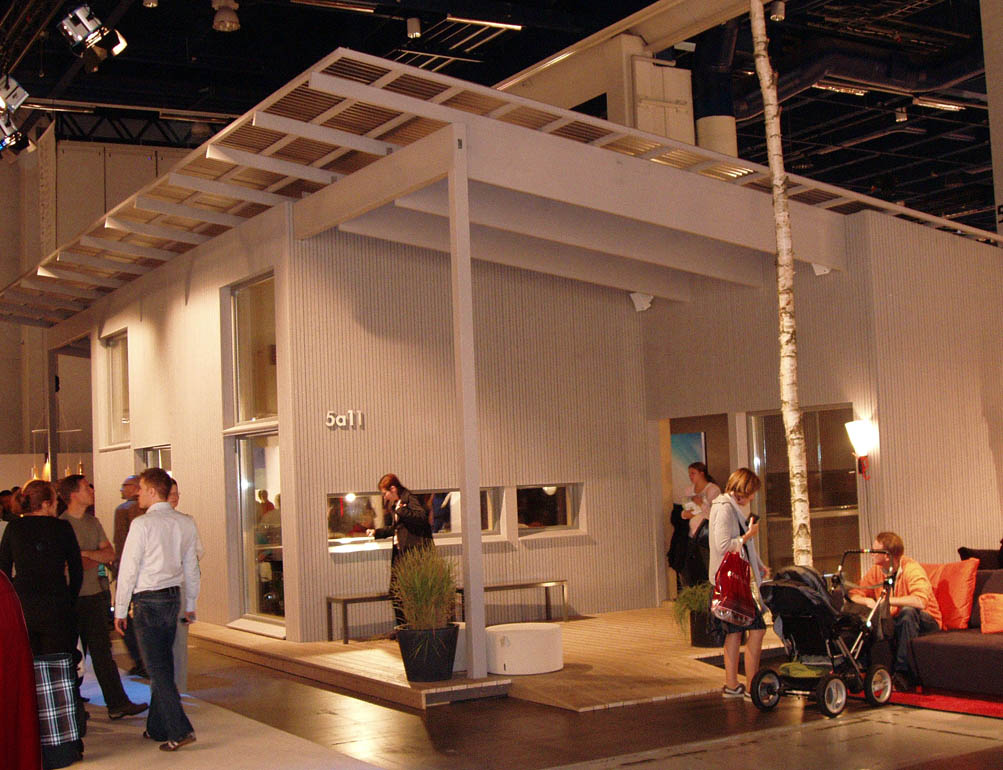
Laavu prototype house (2007)

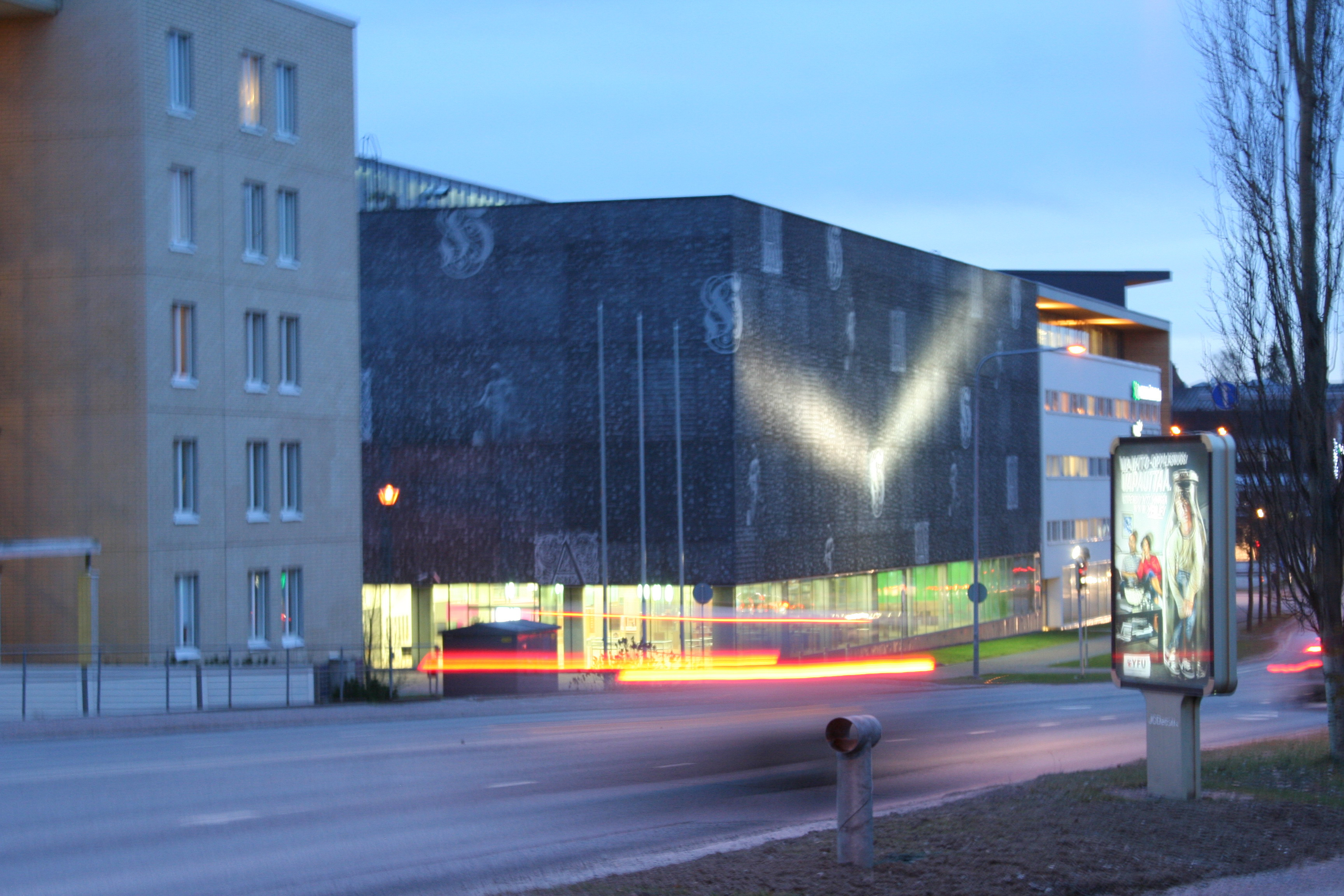
Provincial Archives of Hämeenlinna (2009)

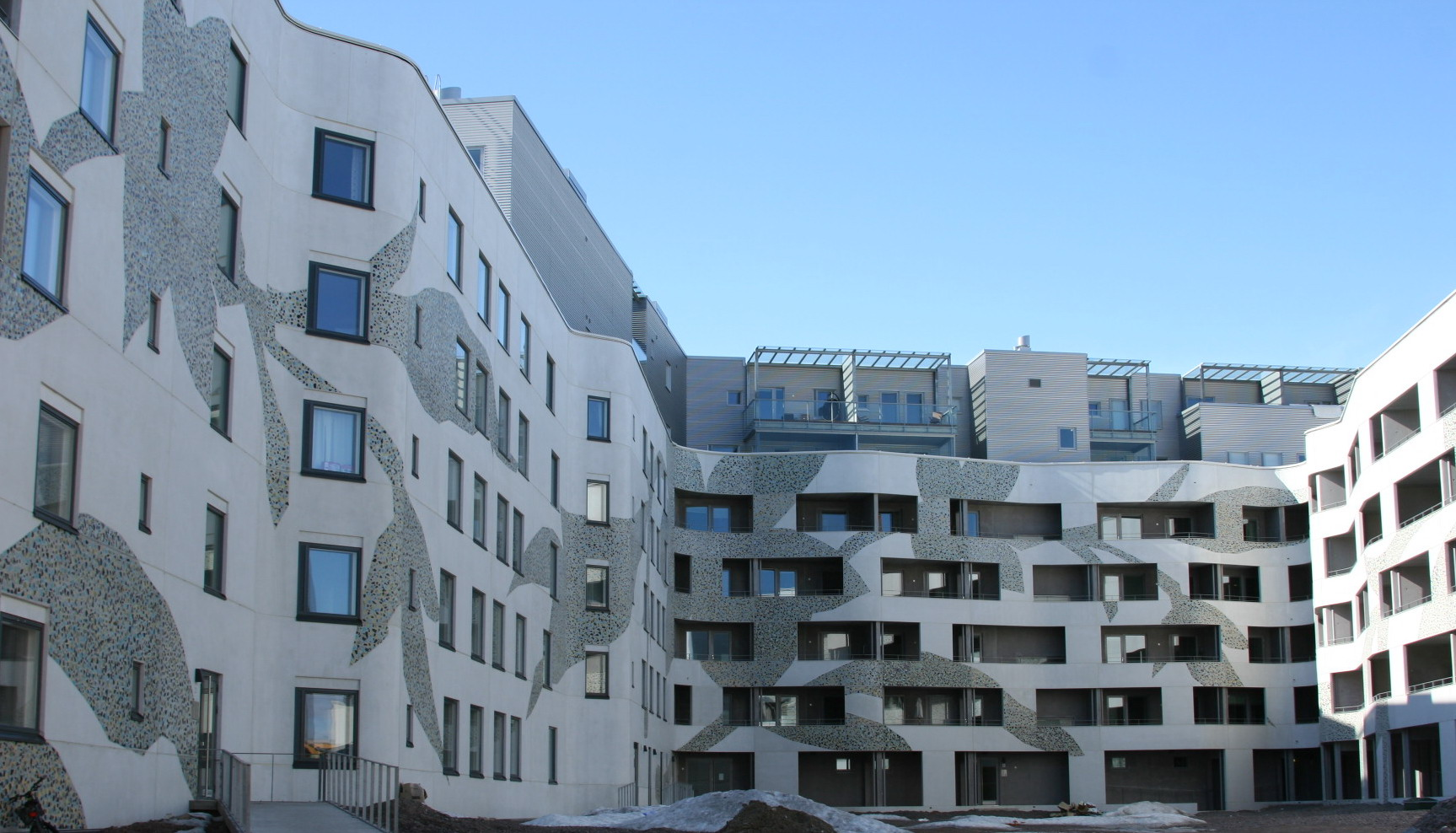
Flooranaukio Housing, Helsinki (2012)
