= The Same River =

2009 novel by Jaan Kaplinski

- Cover of 2009 published Estonian version.
- Author: Jaan Kaplinski
- Original title: Seesama jõgi
- Translator: Susan Wilson
- Language: Estonian
- Publication place: Estonia
- English publication date: 2009

The Same River (Estonian: Seesama jõgi) is a semi-autobiographical novel by Estonian author Jaan Kaplinski. It was first published in 2007.

The book describes a summer in the early 60's in the city of Tartu from the viewpoint of an unnamed student, who seeks to attain sexual and mystical knowledge. He is influenced by a Teacher, a theologian and poet, who is spied upon by the communist authorities.

The Same River is Kaplinski's first proper novel and took almost twelve years to write. Translations appeared in English (2009), Swedish (Samma flod, 2009), Finnish (Sama joki, 2010), Spanish (El mismo río, 2011), Hungarian (Ugyanaz a folyó, 2012), Latvian (Tā pati upe, 2012) and Lithuanian (Ta pati upė, 2018).
