= Per-Edvin Persson =

Finnish scientist (born 1949)

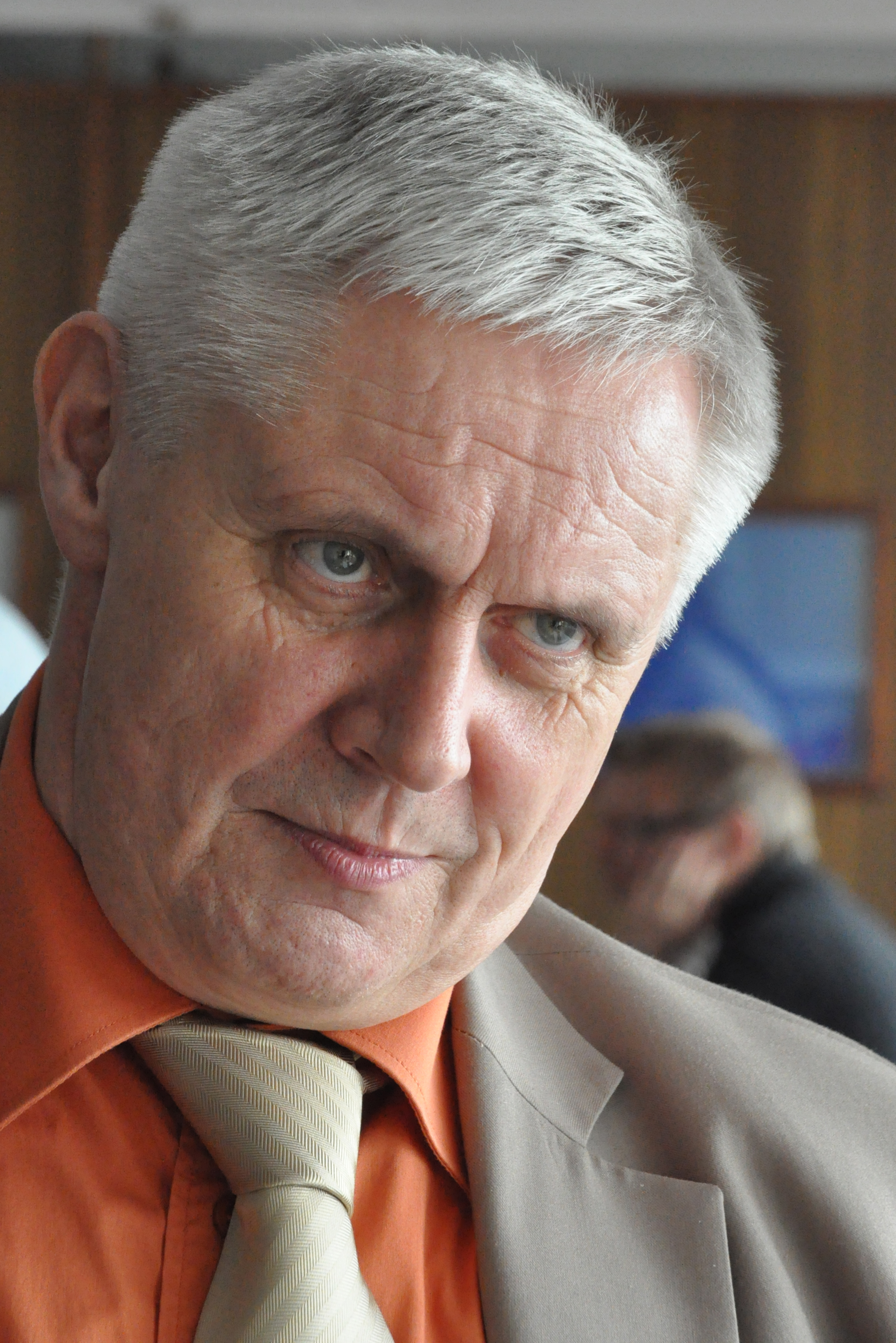
- Persson in 2009

Director of Heureka
- In office 1991–2013
- Succeeded by: Anneli Pauli

Personal details
- Born: 1949 (age 75–76) Helsinki

Per-Edvin Persson (born 1949 in Helsinki) is Director of Heureka, the Finnish Science Centre from 1991 until 2013, being replaced by Anneli Pauli. Before that he was the Director of Science at Heureka (1987–1991) and the Director of the Federation of Finnish Learned Societies (1983–1987). Earlier he was a research scientist at the University of Helsinki, including a fellowship year at the Freshwater Institute in Winnipeg, Manitoba, Canada.

Persson's specialty was tastes and odours in drinking water and fish. He published about 50 scientific papers in his specialty and on eutrophication of waters. He led the international scientific co-operation in this field in 1982–1991.

Persson has held and holds several positions of trust in science policy. He was a member of the Board of the Academy of Finland in 1992-1994 and a member of the Nordic Science Policy Council (Copenhagen) in 1986–1992. He is Chair of the Board of the Finnish Game and Fisheries Research Institute 2012–2014.

Persson led Heureka to success both at home and internationally. Under his leadership, Heureka's exhibitions have travelled to 25 countries in four continents where they have been seen by 22 million visitors. Persson served as president of the Nordic Science Centre Association in 1987–1991, of the European Science Centre Association ECSITE in 1997–1998 and of the international Association of Science-Technology Centers (ASTC) in 2004–2005. He started the tradition of Science Centre World Congresses. He has held and holds several positions of trust in several countries. In Finland, he chairs the educational organisation Svenska folkskolans vänner since 2010.

In 2007, Persson received the ASTC Fellow Award for Outstanding Contribution. He is Knight (1st degree) of the Order of the White Rose of Finland and Knight of the French order Ordre national du Mérite.
