= Tiia Toomet =

Estonian writer and poet

Tiia Toomet (born 9 February 1947) is an Estonian writer and poet.

Toomet was born in Tallinn. She graduated from the University of Tartu, studying history. She also graduated from the State Art Institute (now the Estonian Academy of Arts), studying textile art.

She has been the director of the Tartu Toy Museum.

== Selected works ==
She has written about 40 children's books.

== Personal life ==
Her husband was writer and poet Jaan Kaplinski.
