= Anne Lill =

Estonian classical philologist

Emeritus Professor Anne Lill
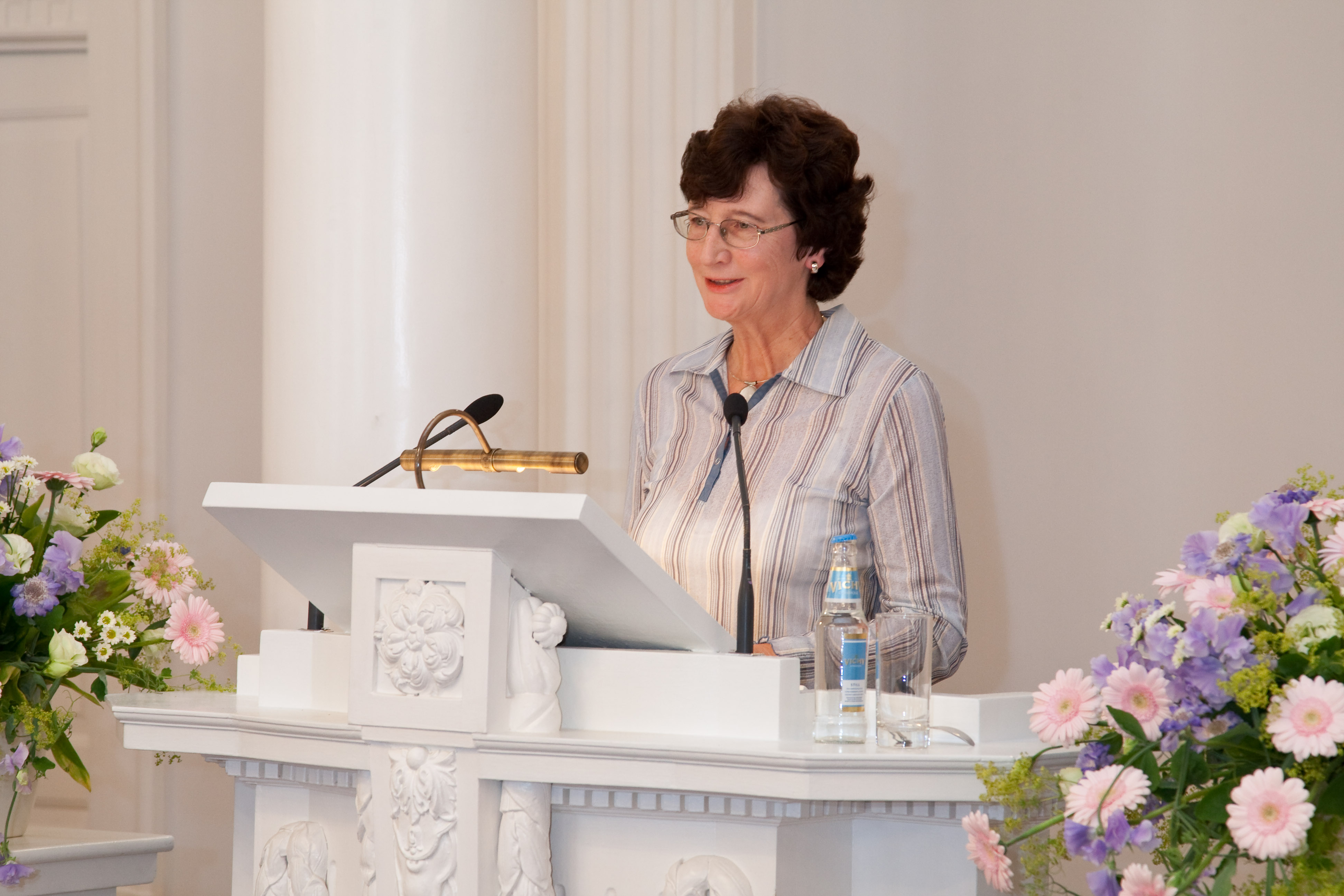
- Born: Anne Laansoo; 15 October 1946 (age 79)
- Occupations: Classical scholar; Philologist

Academic background
- Education: University of Tartu; Leningrad State University
- Alma mater: University of Tartu
- Thesis: Võõrpäritoluga terminielemendid eesti meditsiiniterminoloogia kujunemisel 1869-1914 (1987)

Anne Lill (née Laansoo; born 15 October 1946) is an Estonian classical philologist and translator. She is Professor Emeritus at the University of Tartu.

== Education ==
Anne Laansoo was born on 15 October 1946. She graduated from University of Tartu in 1970. From 1976 to 1978 she was a postgraduate student at Leningrad State University. In 1987 she defended her doctoral thesis at the University of Tartu with research entitled: "The foreign elements in terms of medical terminology in shaping Estonian 1869-1914". This work examined the issues around the transfer of the Latin and Ancient Greek prefix and suffix systems from classical to other languages.

== Career ==
Lill started working at Tartu State University in 1978. She was first a lecturer at the Department of Foreign Languages, then from 1989 to 1992 she was an associate professor. In 1991, based on Lill's initiative, classical philology as a specialism was restored at the University of Tartu. From 1992 to 2012 she was a Professor of Classical Philology; since 16 April 2012 Lill has been Professor Emeritus.

Lill has supervised many students, including legal scholar Merike Ristikivi. She has published widely and translated several classical authors, including: Aristophanes, Euripides, Aristotle, Euripides' Iphigenia in Aulis, Apuleius. She has published on Horace's Carpe Diem, as well as the concept of the symposium in Latin and Greek literature. She has translated German and Russian texts to Estonian, including those of Freud, Nietzsche and Stolovich.

== Selected publications ==
- The Lexicon of Tragedy: Themes and Characters in Ancient Greek Theatre (Tartu, 2004)
- Man and the World in Greek Tragedy (Tartu, 2008)

== Awards ==
- 2001 - Order of the White Star, Class V.
- 2013 - Aleksander Kurtna Award.

== Personal life ==
Anne Lill's father was noted violinist and guitarist Emil Laansoo. She had a previous relationship with writer, poet, translator, cultural critic and philosopher Jaan Kaplinski, with whom she has a son, composer Märt-Matis Lill, born in 1975.
