= Jaan Kaplinski =

Estonian poet, philosopher, and culture critic (1941–2021)

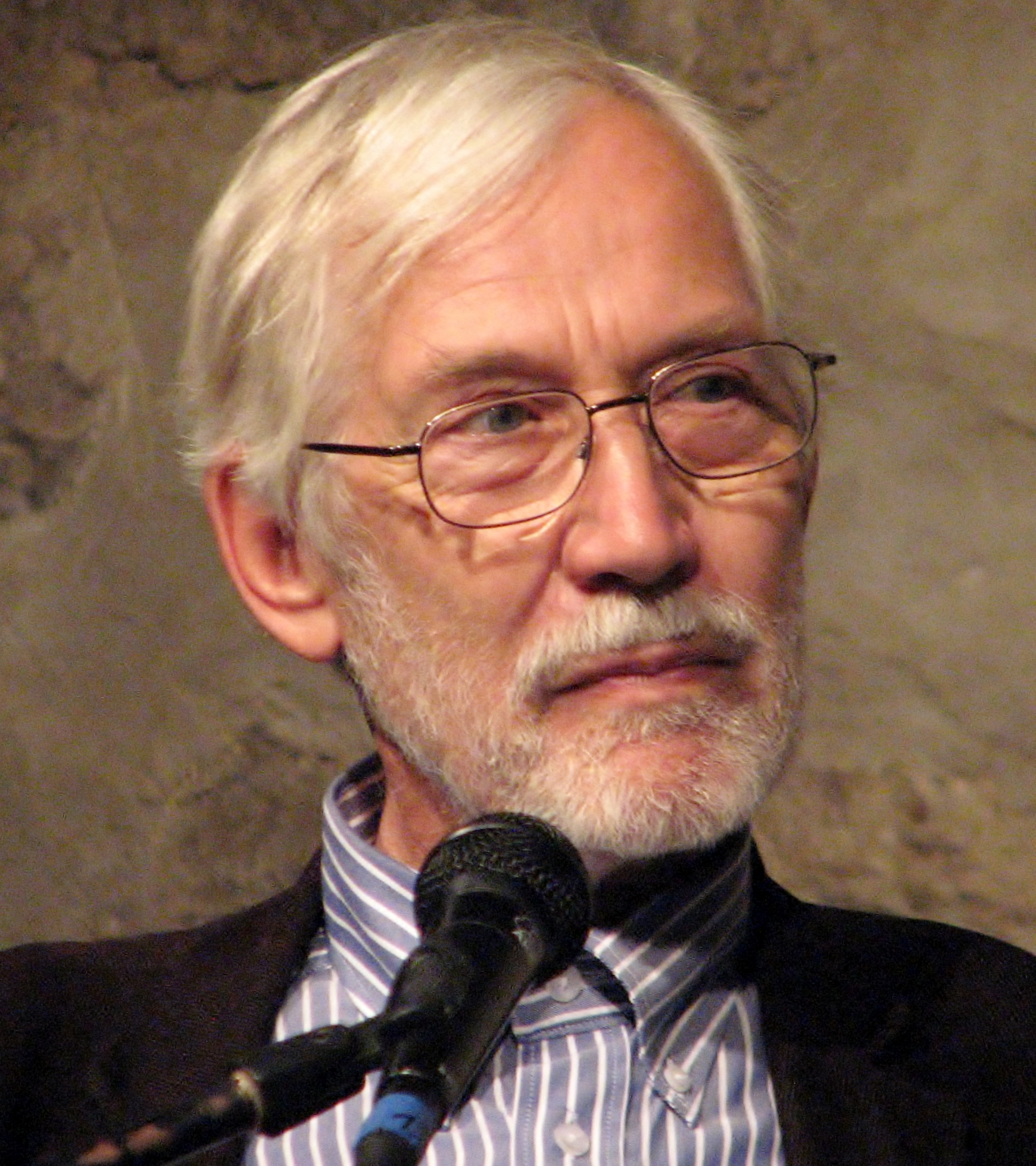
- Born: 22 January 1941 Tartu, then part of Estonian SSR, Soviet Union
- Died: 8 August 2021
- Notable works: Letter of 40 intellectuals The Same River
- Notable awards: Baltic Assembly Prize for Literature, the Arts and Science

Website
- jaan.kaplinski.com/index.html

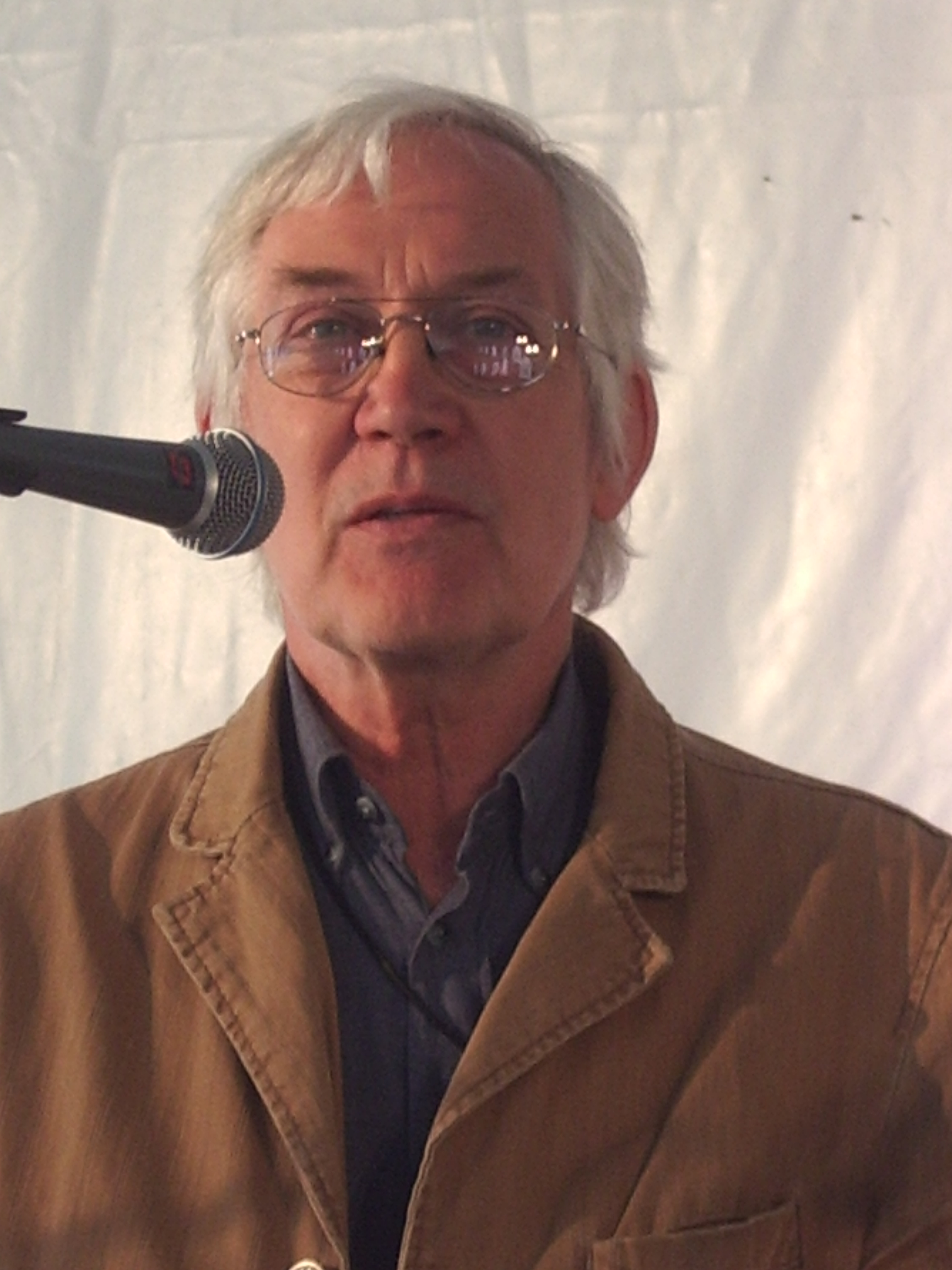
Jaan Kaplinski performing during Tallinn Literature Festival in May 2009

Jaan Kaplinski (22 January 1941 – 8 August 2021) was an Estonian poet, philosopher, politician, and culture critic, known for his focus on global issues and support for left-wing/liberal thinking. He was influenced by Eastern philosophical schools (Taoism and especially Buddhism).

He worked as a translator, editor, and sociologist and as an ecologist at the Tallinn Botanic Garden. He was nominated for the Nobel Prize in Literature.

== Early life and education ==
Kaplinski was born 22 January 1941 in Tartu to Polish teacher Jerzy Kapliński and Estonian dancer Nora Raudsepp-Kaplinski. Kaplinski studied Romance languages and linguistics under Kallista Kann at the University of Tartu, graduating as a French philologist in 1964.

== Career ==
Kaplinski worked as a translator, editor, and sociologist, and ecologist at the Tallinn Botanic Garden.

=== Political career ===
From 1992 to 1995 Kaplinski was a member of the Riigikogu (the Estonian parliament), representing the Estonian Social Democratic Party. He was originally elected on the Centre Party list, but soon became an independent member of parliament. From 2004, he was a member of the Estonian Social Democratic Party. In the 2005 local elections, he ran in Tartu and was the ESDP's leading candidate on its list. Kaplinski was elected as the second candidate on the Social Democratic Party list, receiving 1,045 votes. Jaan Kaplinski was one of the intellectuals who supported Toomas Hendrik Ilves's candidacy.

== Personal life ==
Kaplinski's mother, Nora (Raudsepp), was Estonian. His father was Jerzy Bonifacy Edward Kapliński, a Polish professor of philology at Tartu University, who was arrested by Soviet troops and died of starvation in a Soviet labour camp in 1943. His great-uncle was Polish painter and political activist Leon Kapliński. As an adult, Kaplinski came to believe that his father had distant Jewish ancestry, and was a relative of Jacob Frank.

Kaplinski was married to writer and director of the Tartu Toy Museum, Tiia Toomet. They had three sons and one daughter - Ott-Siim Toomet, Lauris Kaplinski, Lemmit Kaplinski and Elo-Mall Toomet. He had a daughter, translator Maarja Kaplinski, from his first marriage to Küllike Kaplinski. He had a relationship with Estonian classical philologist and translator Anne Lill, with whom he had a son, composer Märt-Matis Lill.

== Writings ==
Kaplinski published numerous collections of poems, prose, and essays. He translated writings from French, English, Spanish, Chinese, including the Tao Te Ching, and Swedish, the work of Tomas Tranströmer.

Kaplinski's own work has been translated into English, Finnish, French, Norwegian, Swedish, Dutch, Icelandic, Hungarian, Japanese, Latvian, Lithuanian, Russian, Hebrew, Bulgarian, and Czech. His essays deal with environmental problems, philosophy of language, classical Chinese poems, philosophy, Buddhism, and Estonian nationalism.

Kaplinski also composed poems in English and Finnish. In the 2000s he began writing in Russian, and his first original Russian collection (composed of some of his poems translated from Estonian into Russian) appeared in 2014 under the title White Butterflies of Night (Белые бабочки ночи) and was awarded in Russia.

Kaplinski was one of the authors and initiators of the so-called Letter of 40 intellectuals (Neljakümne kiri) action. A letter signed by well-known Estonian intellectuals protesting against the behavior of the authorities in Soviet-annexed Estonia was sent to the main newspapers of the time. Although not openly dissident, the letter was never published in the press at that time and those who signed were repressed using administrative measures.

His semi-autobiographical novel The Same River is published by Peter Owen in English translation by Susan Wilson.

In 1997, he was awarded the Baltic Assembly Prize for Literature, the Arts and Science.

=== Poems ===
- The East West Border...

The Same Sea in Us All (Barbarian Press, 1985) (translated by the author with Sam Hamill)

- The Wandering Border (Copper Canyon Press, 1987) (translated by the author with Sam Hamill and Riina Tamm)
- Evening Brings Everything Back (Bloodaxe, 2004)
- Contributor to A New Divan: A Lyrical Dialogue between East and West (Gingko Library, 2019)

== Legacy ==
- Main-belt asteroid 29528 Kaplinski is named after Jaan Kaplinski.
- In 2022 Jaan Kaplinski Society was founded in Estonia.

== See also ==
- Buddhism in Estonia
