= Tartu University Hospital Children's Foundation =

Foundation in Estonia

- Founded: 2001
- Type: Charity
- Headquarters: Ludvig Puusepa 1, 50406 Tartu, Estonia
- Coordinates: 58.3681°N 26.7021°E
- Region served: Estonia
- Official language: Estonian
- Chairman: Jaan Kelder
- Key people: Küllike Saar
- Website: www.lastefond.ee

Tartu University Hospital Children's Foundation (Estonian: Tartu Ülikooli Kliinikumi Lastefond) is one of the largest and oldest charitable foundations in Estonia that provides support for the programs and initiatives of children's hospitals. Since 2001, Children's Foundation has raised more than one million euros for children.

== Activity ==
The Tartu University Hospital Children's Foundation provides funding for medical equipment for the Tartu University Hospital Children’s Clinic and other children’s departments of the hospital.

It also supports treatment for children with rare diseases across Estonia, international lecturers’ visits to Estonia, and international training courses for doctors and nurses.

The foundation also assists supporters and volunteers in reaching people in need.

To achieve its goals, the Children’s Foundation focuses its work in three main areas:

- increasing the number of regular donors and supporters;
- supporting children with severe and profound disabilities and their families;
- informing people in need about how to obtain assistance, and informing donors and supporters about opportunities to contribute.

The Foundation operates with a commitment to the principles stated in the "Code of Ethics of Estonian non-profit organizations".

== Goals ==
The main goals of the Tartu University Hospital Children’s Foundation are:

- To increase the quality of medical care for children at the Children’s Clinic and other pediatric clinics of Tartu University Hospital.
- To identify and bring public attention to issues in the provision of medical care for children.
- To raise public awareness of children’s diseases to prevent them, improve early detection, and enhance treatment results.
- To help children overcome the social problems caused by various diseases.
- To educate children, young people, and their families to promote a healthy lifestyle among them.
- The Foundation’s mission is to raise awareness and concern for children who are among the weakest and most vulnerable members of society.

== Founders ==
The Children's Foundation was started in 2001 by 26 individuals: Priit Alamäe, Teet Jagomägi, Aino Järvesoo, Arno Justus, Mart Einasto, Jaan Kallas, Antti Kask, Malle Keis, Jaan Kelder, Jüri Kirss, Juhan Kolk, Aare Märtson, Robert Närska, Aune Past, Jaanus Pikani, Andres Piirsoo, Parvel Pruunsild, Uudo Reino, Piret Roos, Urmas Siigur, Olari Taal, Tiina Talvik, Raul Talvik, Jaano Uibo, Karin Varik, Merli Siff.

== Board ==
- Jaan Kelder (chairman) (AS Gildhall)
- Antti Kask (Cramo Estonia AS)
- Reet Hääl (Eesti Liisingühingute Liit)
- Jaan Kallas (Põllumajanduse Registrite ja Informatsiooni Amet)
- Andres Koern
- Parvel Pruunsild (BIGBANK AS)
- Merli Siff
- Peeter Tulviste (University of Tartu)
