= Jaan Lukas =

Estonian military personnel

Jaan Lukas (before 1929 Luukas; 24 October 1892 – 8 May 1953) was an Estonian military personnel (Colonel).

1939-1940 he was the commander of 1st Infantry Regiment.

In 1950 he was arrested.

Awards:

- 1936: Order of the Cross of the Eagle, III class.
