= Märt-Matis Lill =

Estonian composer

Mart-Matis Lill
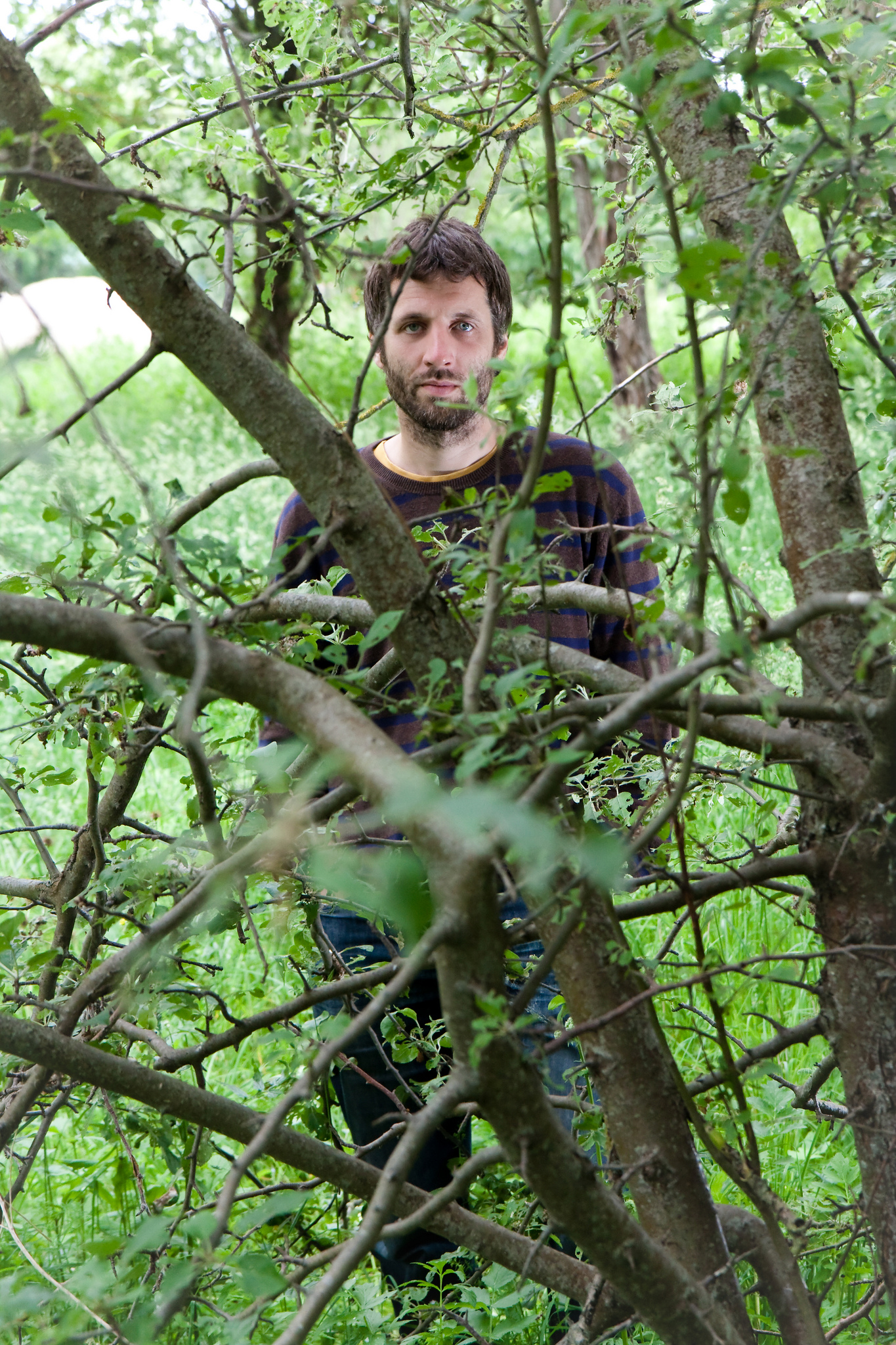
- Music Composer

Background information
- Born: November 8, 1975 (age 50); Tartu, Estonia
- Occupation: Composer
- Years active: 1999-present

Märt-Matis Lill (born 6 November 1975) is an Estonian composer.

== Early life and education ==
Märt-Matis Lill was born in Tartu, and is the son of writer, translator, cultural critic, and philosopher Jaan Kaplinski and classical philologist and translator Anne Lill. Guitarist and violinist Emil Lansoo was his grandfather.

He studied composition at the Tallinn Music High School under Lepo Sumera. In 1999 he graduated from Estonian Academy of Music and Theatre.

He earned a master's degree at the Sibelius Academy in Helsinki with Veli-Matti Puumala. Lill has improved his skills in composition at master courses with Louis Andriessen, Michael Jarrell, Luca Francesconi and Magnus Lindberg.

As composer and the chairman of the Estonian Composers’ Union, he writes on the 70th anniversary of the birth of Lepo Sumera, one of the most influential composers in post-war Estonia, about his old mentor’s restlessness, warmth and work.

== Affiliations ==
He has been the artistic director of the Pärnu New Music Days Festival.

Since 2000, he has been a member of the Estonian Composers' Union. From 2014, he has been the chairman of Estonian Composers' Union.

== Works ==
- 1999 "Üleminekuriitus" ("Le rite de passage")
- 2001 "Seitse laulu sügisest" (for baritone and piano)
- 2002 "Linnujäljed taeval"
- 2002 "Etnofuturistlikud etüüdid"
- 2003 "Farwell"
- 2003 "Taeva jõgi" (for chamber orchestra)
- 2015 "Kui kivid olid veel pehmed"
- 2017 opera "Tulleminek"
