= Heino Eller Tartu Music College =

Music school in Tartu, Estonia

Coordinates: 58°22′47.69″N 26°43′5.26″E

- Estonian: Heino Elleri nimeline Tartu Muusikakool
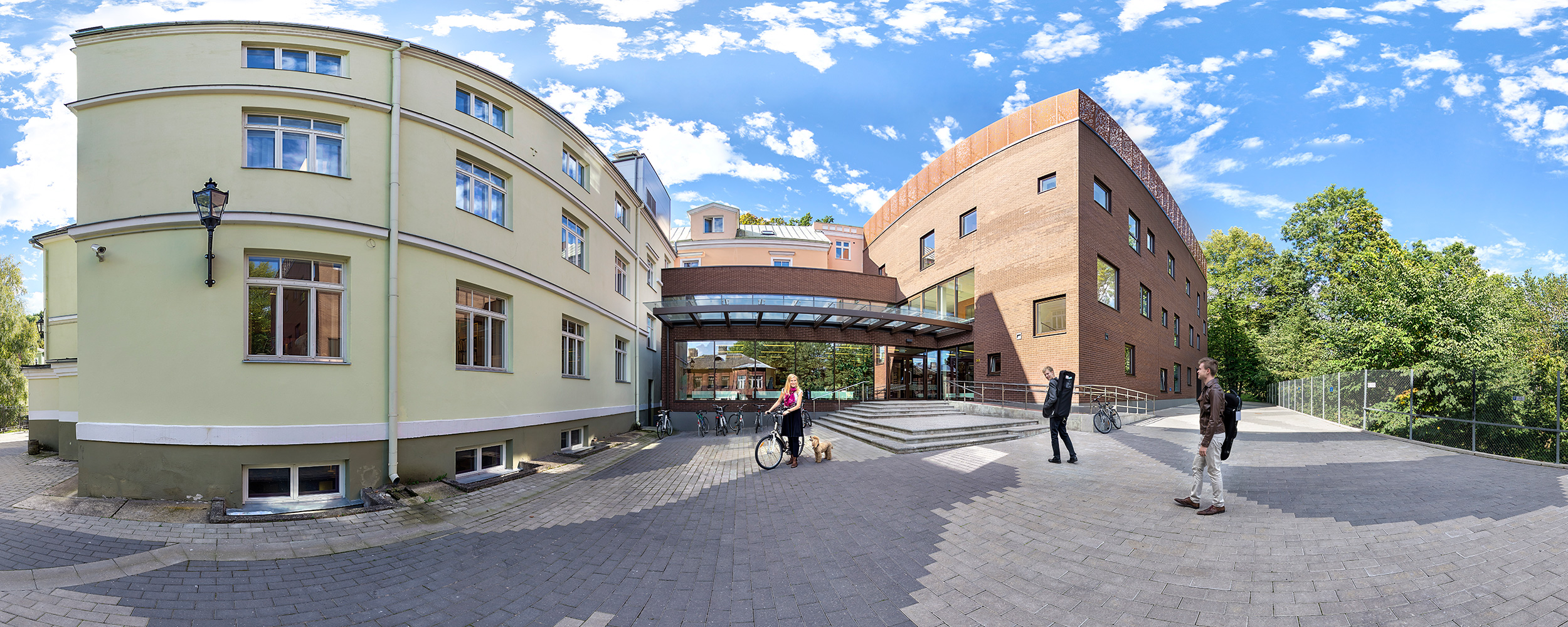

Information
- Former name: Tartu Higher Music School; Estonian: Tartu Kõrgem Muusikakool
- Established: 1919; 106 years ago
- Website: www.tmk.ee

The Heino Eller Tartu Music College (Estonian: Heino Elleri nimeline Tartu Muusikakool) is a music school in Tartu, Estonia, founded in 1919. It was originally called Tartu Higher Music School but received its current name in 1971, after the Estonian composer and music teacher Heino Eller, who taught at the school from 1920 until 1940.

== Tartu School of Composition ==
Heino Eller's return to Tartu in 1920, to teach in the Tartu Music School, led to the development in the 1920s–1930s of the Tartu school of composition

In the 1920s, the school was named Tartu Higher Music School (Estonian: Tartu Kõrgem Muusikakool).

Those identified with the school include:

- Composers
  - Heino Eller (originator)
  - Eduard Tubin
  - Eduard Oja
  - Olav Roots
  - Alfred Karindi
  - Johannes Bleive
- Music theorists
  - Karl Leichter
- Faculty
  - Salme Kann
  - Harald Laksberg

== Gallery ==
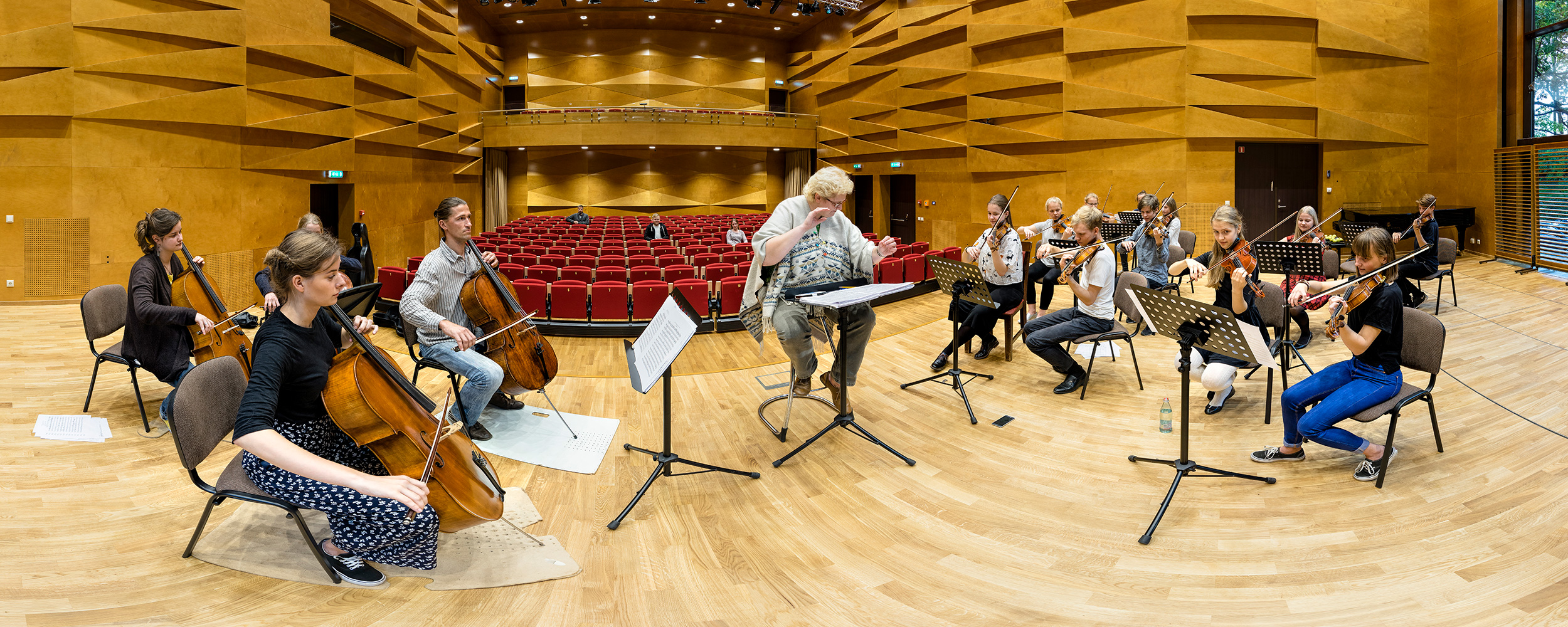
Tubin Hall (view as a 360° interactive panorama)

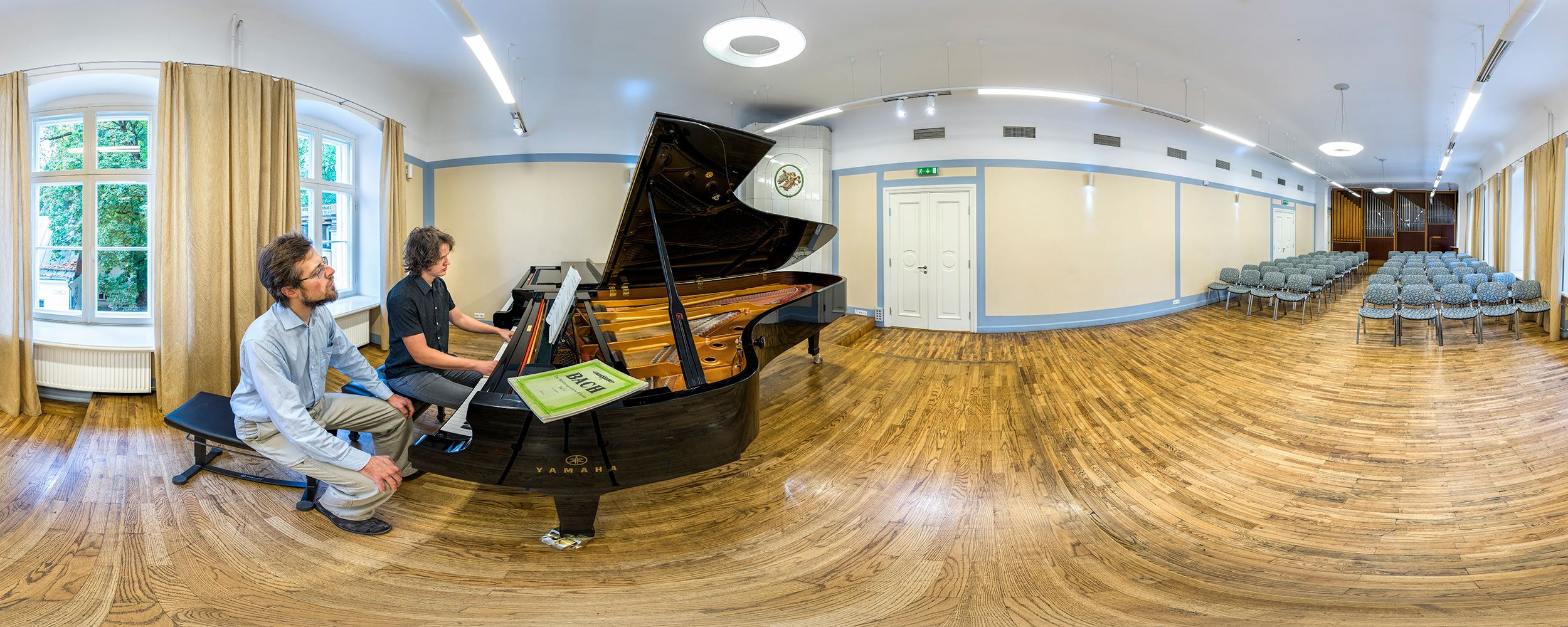
Eller Hall (view as a 360° interactive panorama)

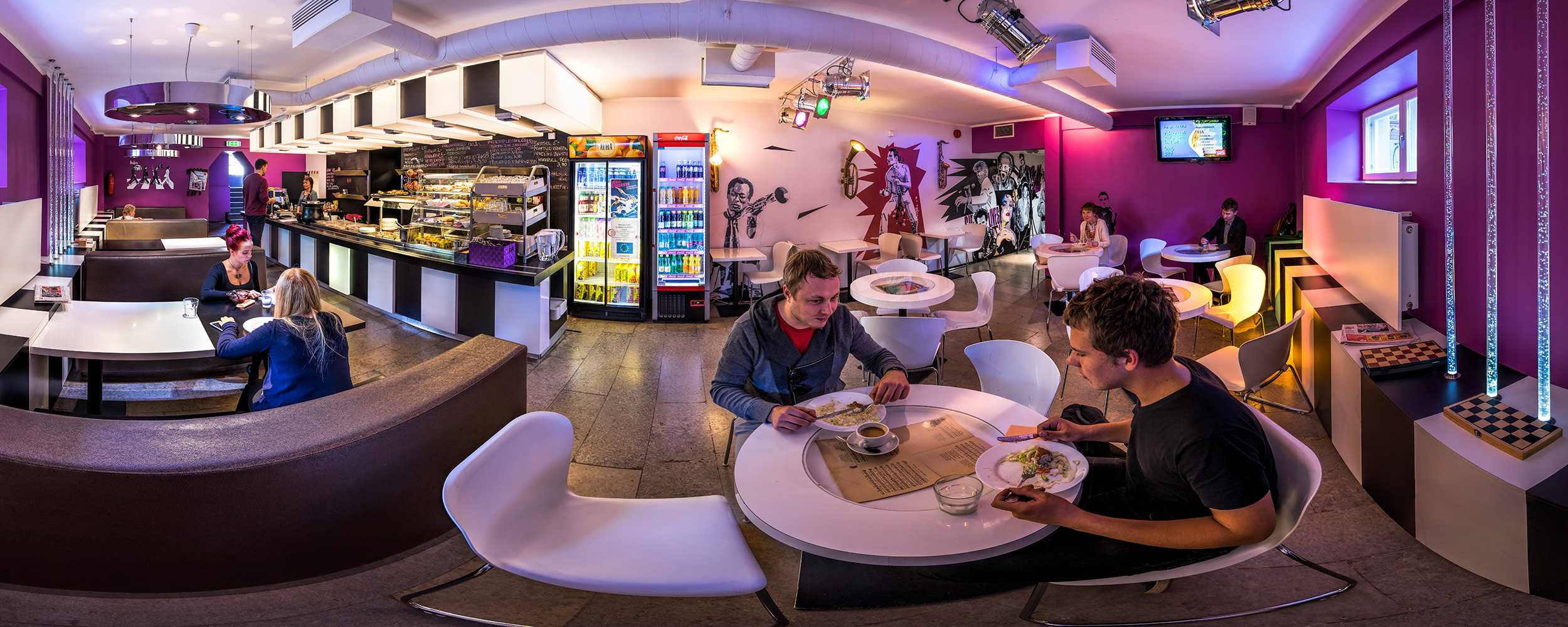
Cafe Heller (view as a 360° interactive panorama)

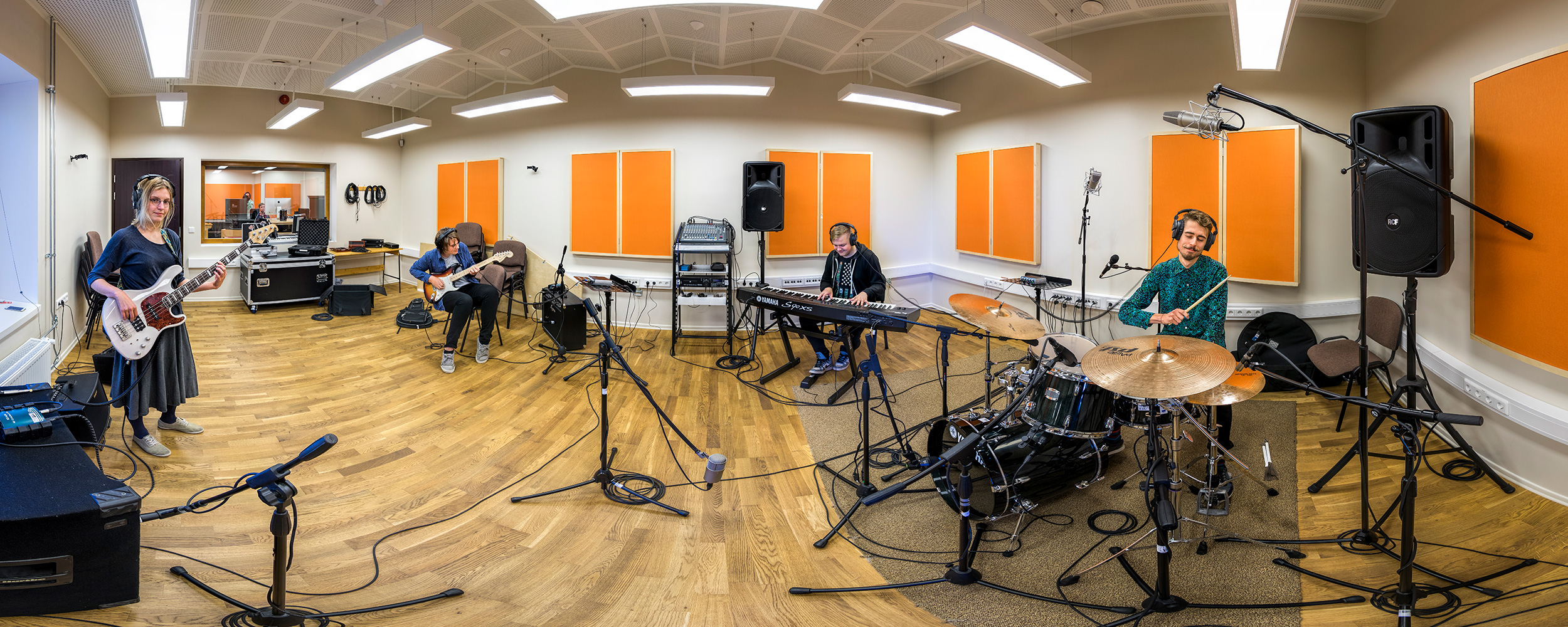
Sound recording studio (view as a 360° interactive panorama)

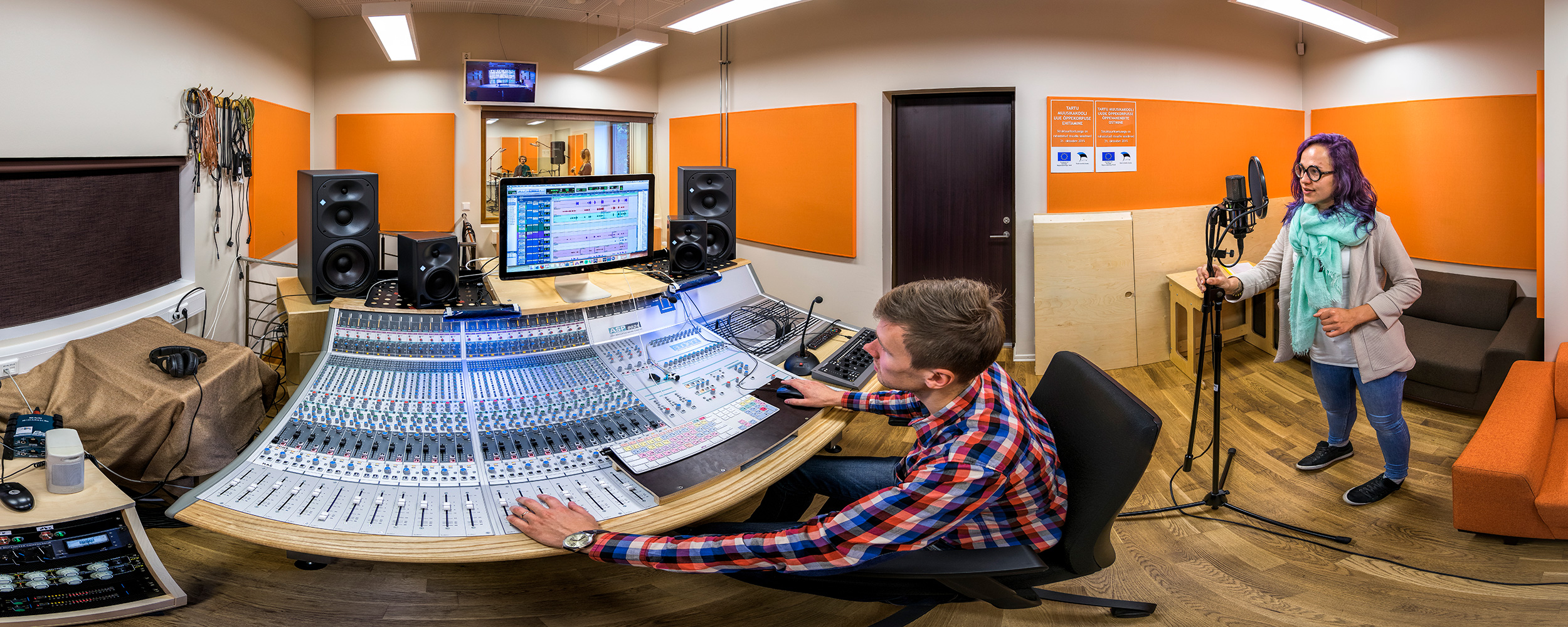
Phonics studio (view as a 360° interactive panorama)

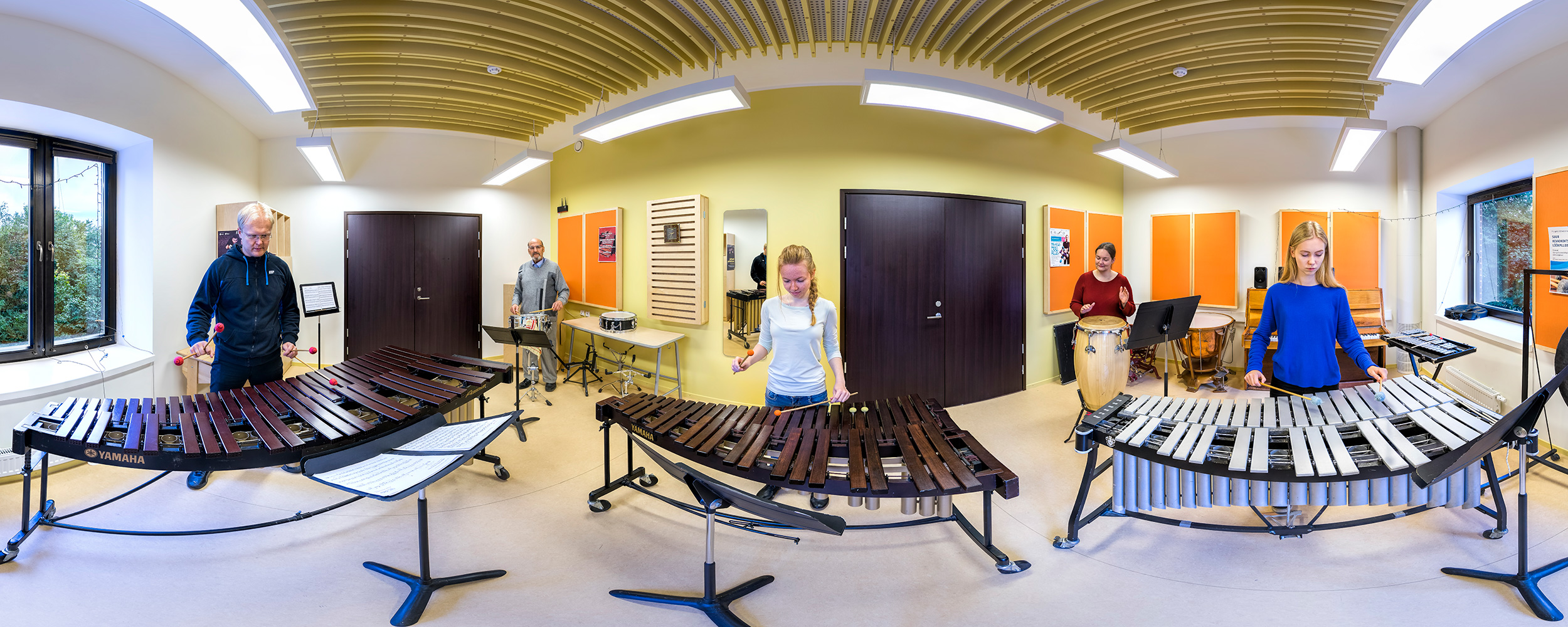
The class of percussion instruments (view as a 360° interactive panorama)

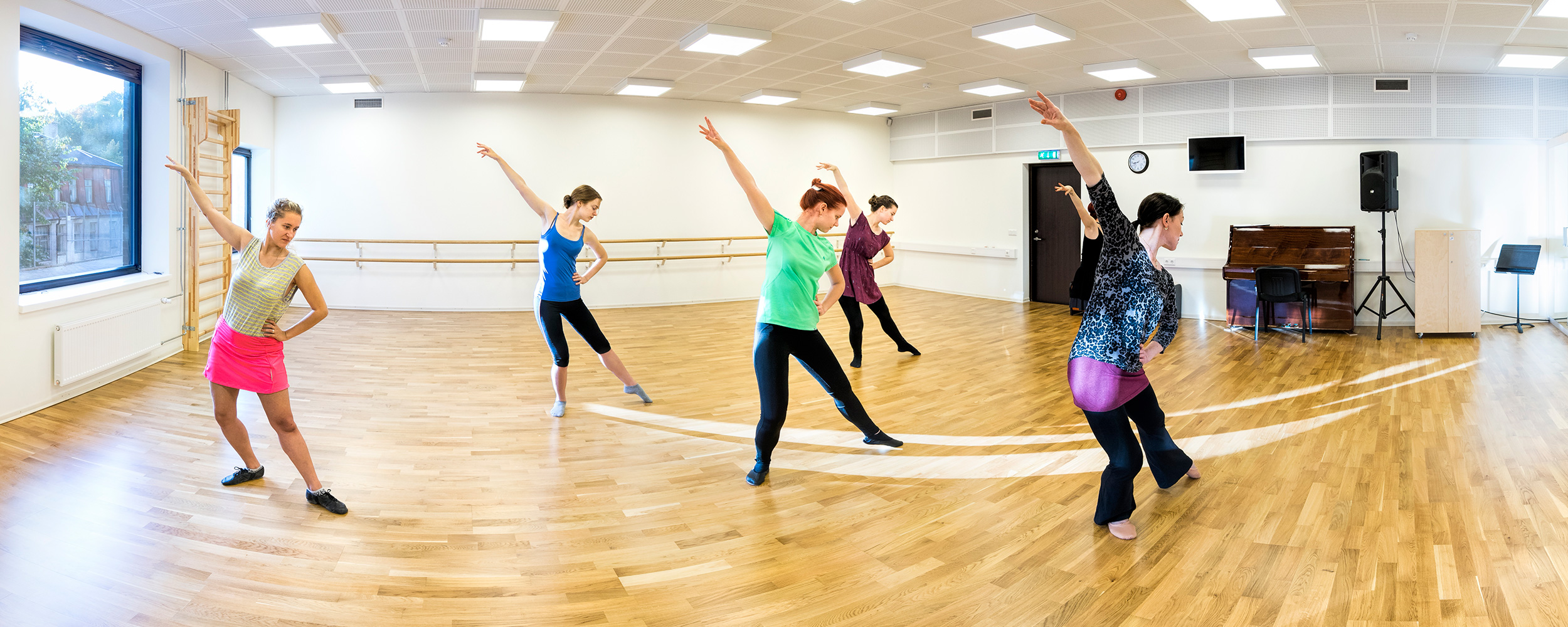
Dance studio
