= Alatskivi Castle =

Castle and manor house in Estonia

- Alatskivi loss
- Alatskivi, Alatskivi Parish, Tartu County, Estonia
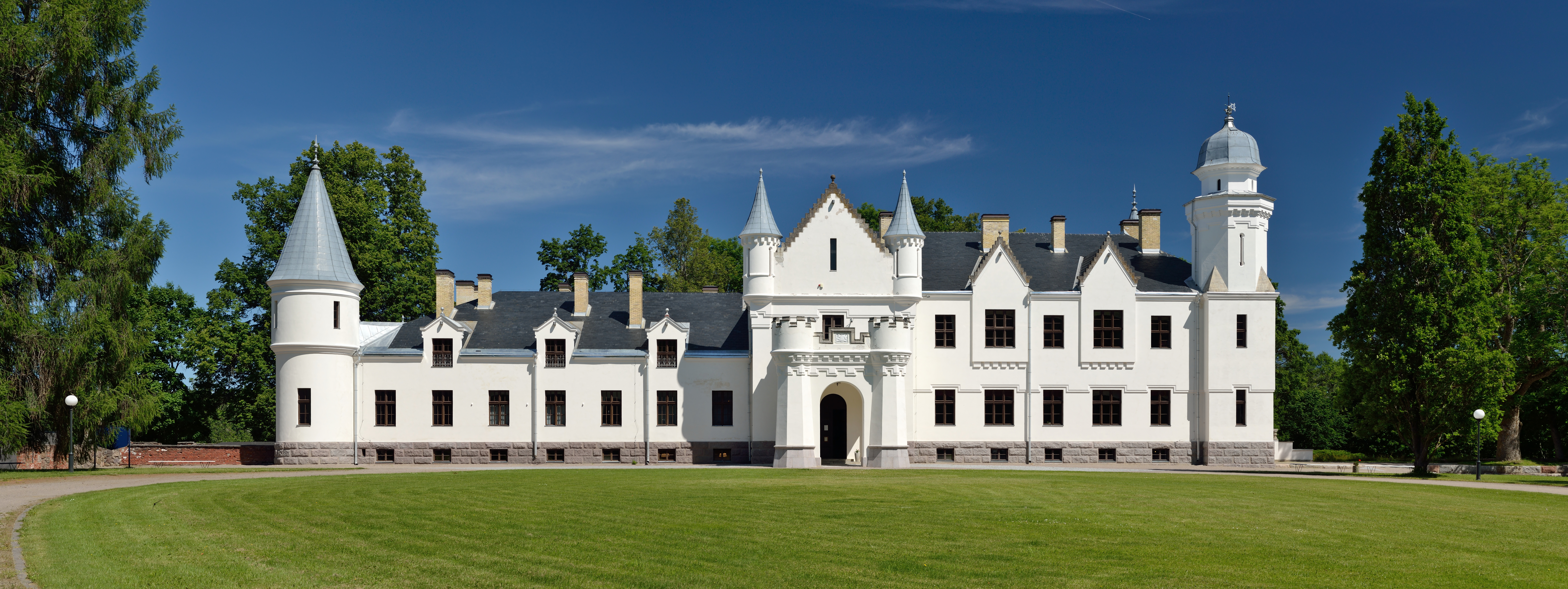
- Front view of Alatskivi Castle

Location
- Alatskivi Castle in Alatskivi village, Estonia
- Coordinates: 58.6039°N 27.1297°E

Site history
- Built: Original in 17th century, rebuilt in late 19th century

Alatskivi Castle (Estonian: Alatskivi loss, German: Schloss Allatzkiwwi) is a neo-Gothic castle in Alatskivi, Estonia. Dating to the 17th century, it is situated in Peipsiääre Parish, Tartu County. It was rebuilt in the late 19th century by Baron Arved von Nolcken, modeled on the royal residence of Balmoral in Scotland. A renovation occurred between 2005 and 2011. Five rooms on the first floor house the Eduard Tubin museum, which documents his accomplishments as a music composer and conductor.

Alatskivi Castle is surrounded by various ancillary buildings and a forested park of 130 hectares (320 acres) area, the largest in Tartu County. The park contains many oaks, ashes, maples, alders and an approach road lined with linden trees.

== Location ==
Alatskivi Castle is located 40 kilometres (25 mi) north of Tartu and 205 kilometres (127 mi) from Tallinn. It is built on the high bank of Lake Alatskivi at the foot of the Alatskivi valley. An arched entrance leads to the castle along a road lined with linden trees.

== History ==
The earliest mention of the manor was in 1601. King Gustav Adolf II of Sweden gave it to his secretary, Johan Adler Salvius, in 1628. In 1642, its ownership was passed on to Hans Detterman Cronman (c. 1600 – c. 1645). In 1753, it was purchased by the Stackelbergs and inherited by the Nolckens in 1870. Baron Arved George de Nolcken (1845–1909) rebuilt the castle between 1876 and 1885 according to his own designs, influenced by the Scottish baronial style used for Queen Victoria's Balmoral Castle in Scotland, which he had visited in 1875. After nationalization occurred in 1919, the castle complex was taken over by the government under the Ministry of Agriculture and became a school, cavalry barracks, state controlled farm land, council offices, cinema and library. It has been fully refurbished to its original form based on the original pictures of the aristocracy and their descendants who resided here. After the 2011 restoration, the castle was opened to the public with the Alatskivi Castle Foundation administrating the castle and the manor complex.

== Features ==
The writer Ain Hinsberg refers to the manor house as having been designed as a mock-English castle. The castle is built to an asymmetrical plan, with single- and double-storied wings, turrets and a slate roof. The building has both single- and double-storied floors. It hosts seminars, training programmes and small conferences, and is fitted with three meeting rooms and dining facilities.

Completed in 2011, the Eduard Tubin Museum is located in five rooms on the first floor of the castle. The main feature is devoted to the life and work of Eduard Tubin who was one of Estonia's most esteemed composers. The initial exhibits are of members of the Tartu school who studied with Tubin, including Heino Eller, Eduard Oja, Alfred Karindi, Olav Roots, and Karl Leichter. Tubin's music scores, manuscripts, books, records, films and photos, musical instruments, records, books, and sketches of theatre costumes are all part of the display. The museum also houses a large-scale model of the castle and plays the music of Tubin.

== Manor Park ==
The 130 hectares (320 acres) large Manor Park consists of oaks, ashes, maples, alders and an approach road lined with linden trees, some trees being grown on terraces. It is the largest in the Tartu County. A hiking track is laid through the park and the Alatskivi Landscape Conservation Area. There are two artificial reservoirs along the Alatskivi River. There is a large boulder at the extreme end of the park in Kõdesi Forest where Apollo Belvedere's statue existed in the past, although the statue has been moved to Kadriorg Park in Tallinn. The main castle is surrounded by many stone buildings. During the 19th century, the manor had 57 buildings, of which 41 remain. These are grouped into four areas connected by roads. The first contains the castle, coaching house and cheese cellar; the second, the economic circle, contains the laundry, kitchen, stables and sheds; the third or border circle, contains the barn, mills, church and cemetery; the outer fourth circle contains the Apollo Belvedere statue and the final resting place of the Estonian folklore figure Kalevipoeg.

== Gallery ==
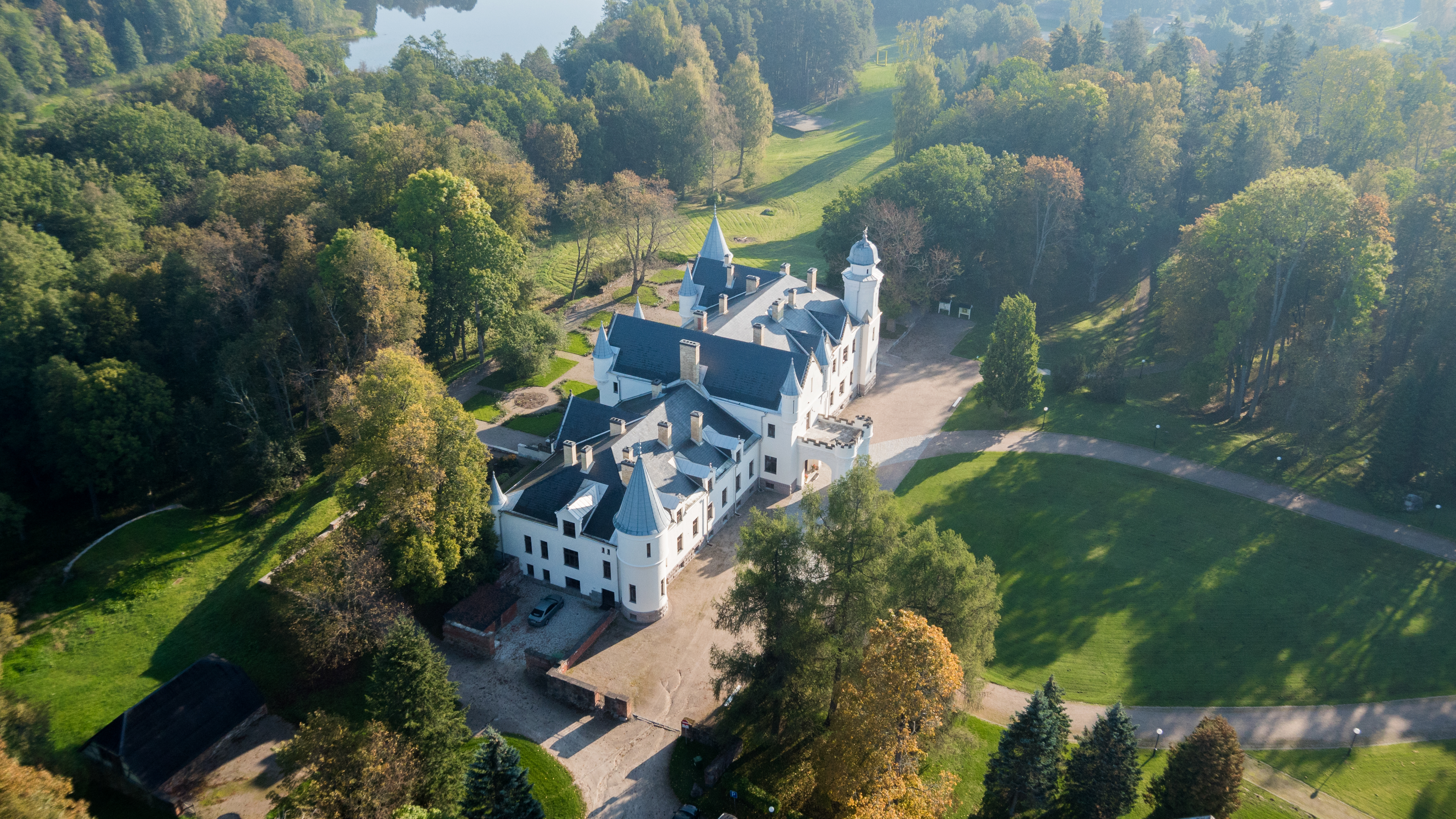
Castle from above

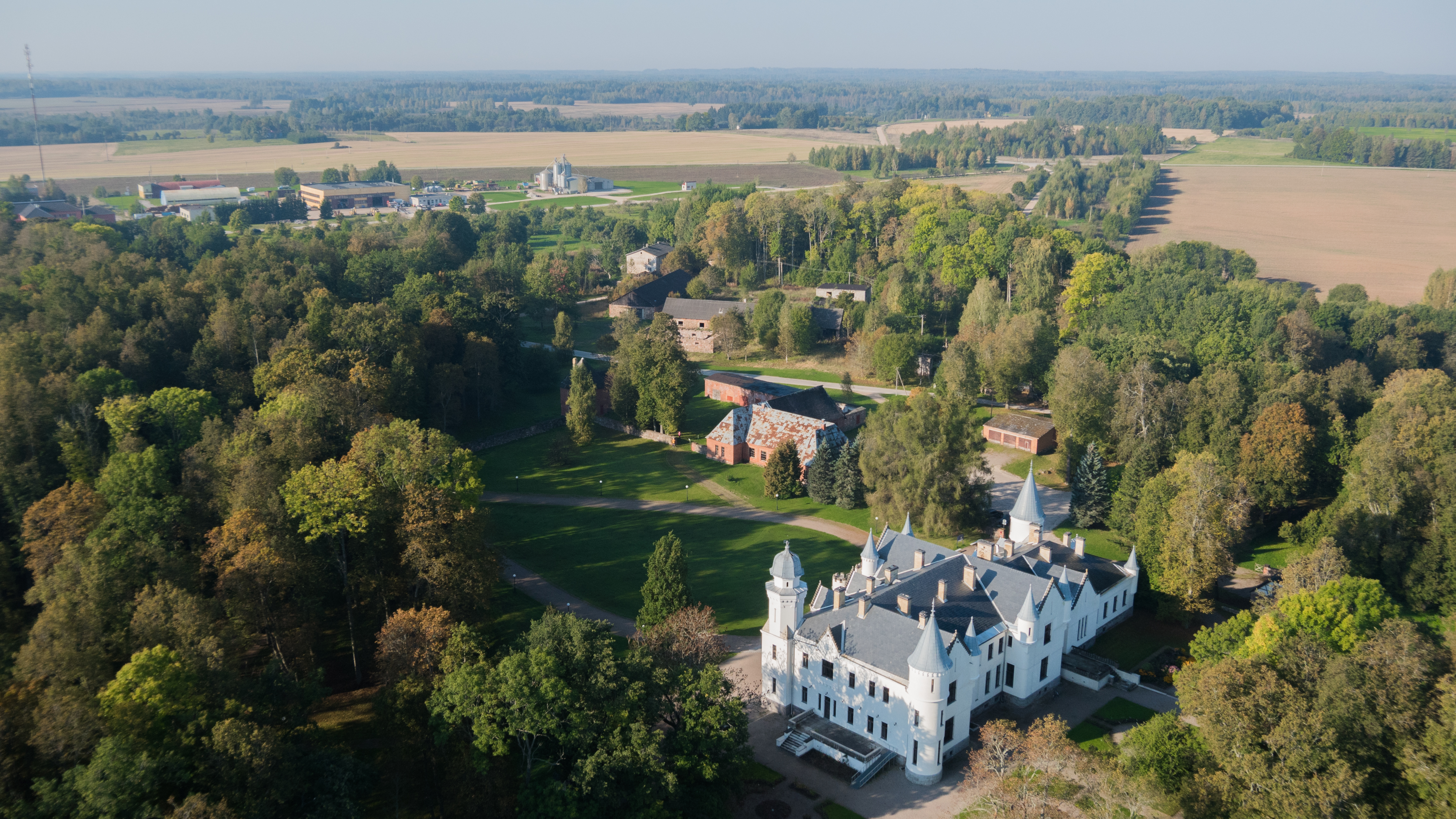
Castle from above

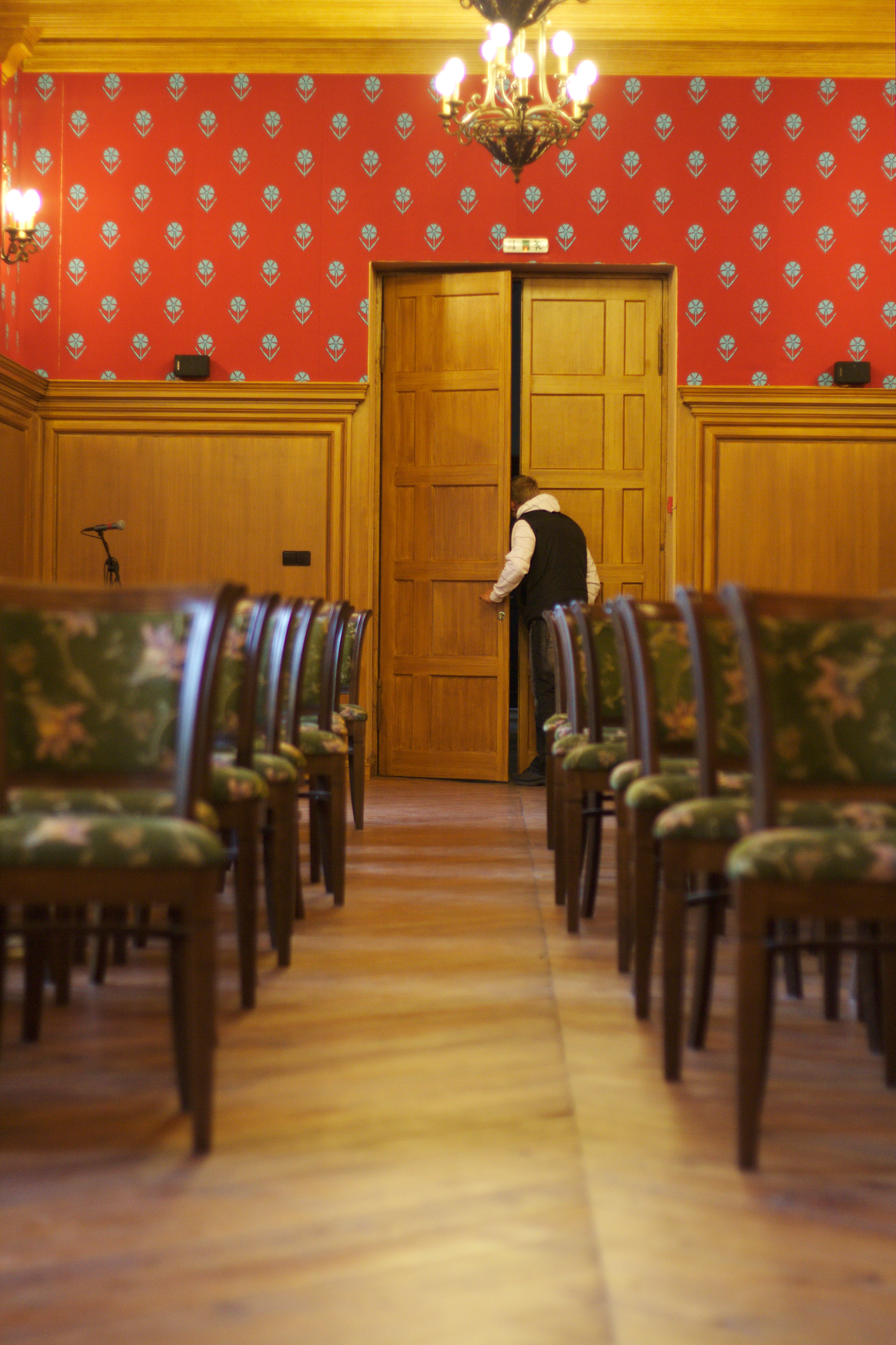
Interior

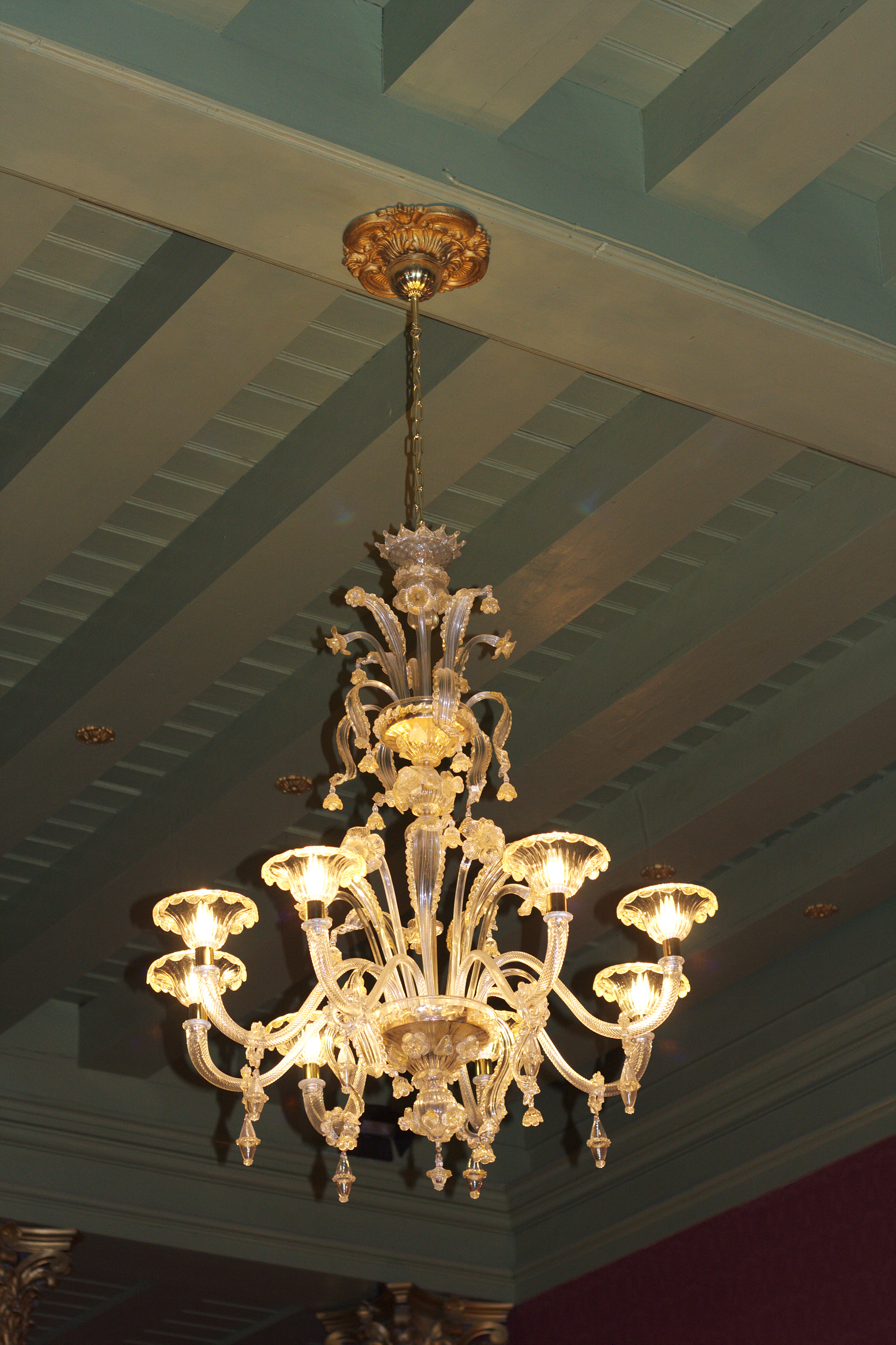
Chandelier

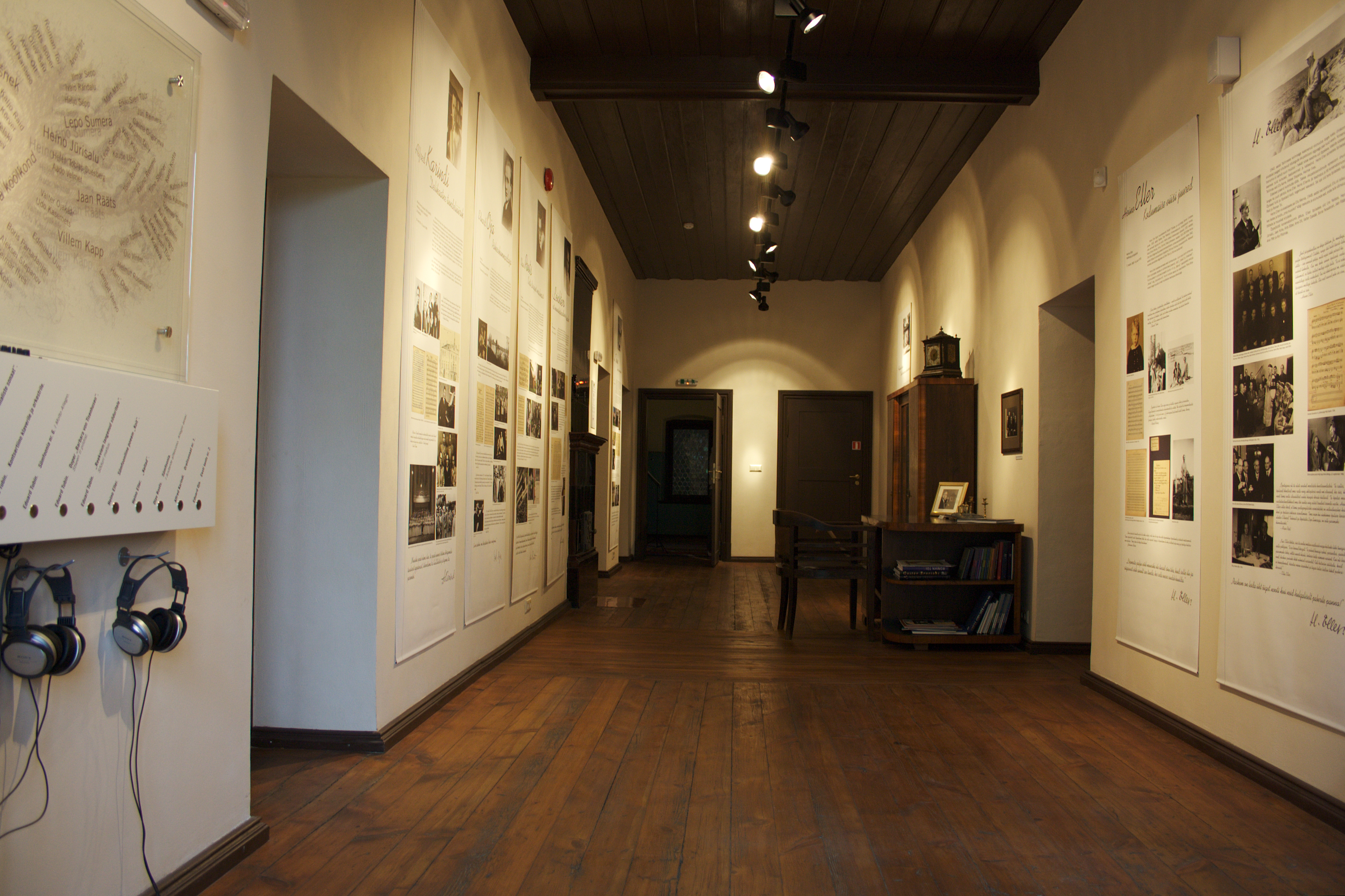
Exhibition
