= Padakõrve Nature Reserve =

Protected area in Estonia

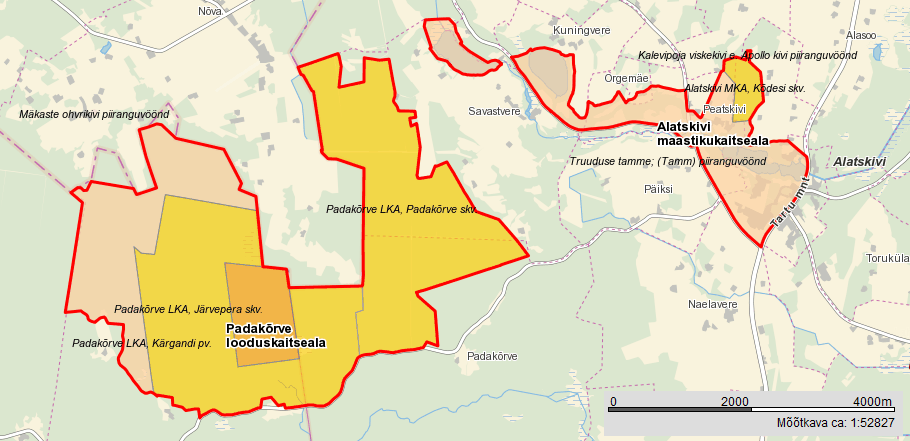

- Location within Estonia
- Location: Estonia
- Coordinates: 58°36′N 27°00′E
- Area: 1,555 ha (3,840 acres)
- Established: 1964 (2006)

Padakõrve Nature Reserve is a nature reserve which is located in Tartu County, Estonia.

The area of the nature reserve is 1555 ha.

The protected area was founded in 1964 on the basis of Alatskivi ants colony (Estonian: Alatskivi metsasipelgate koloonia).
