= Kaljo Raid =

Estonian composer, cellist and clergyman

Kaljo Raid (4 March 1921 – 21 January 2005) was an Estonian composer, cellist and pastor.

He was born in Tallinn. One of three children, he had an older brother and a twin sister. He studied composition at Tallinn Conservatory under Heino Eller. His Symphony No. 1 was performed in 1944, the year of his graduation. He studied theology in Stockholm from 1945 to 1946 and then at the Andover Newton Theological School in Massachusetts from 1946 to 1949. He taught music at Bethel College in St. Paul, Minnesota, meeting Jacques Ibert and Darius Milhaud.

In 1954 he moved to Canada and became the pastor of the Estonian Baptist Church in Toronto; he continued in this capacity for 35 years. As a result of a late marriage in 1982 he became stepfather to five children. After retiring in 1989 he devoted himself full-time to composition. He died at Richmond Hill, Ontario in 2005.

Among his works are four symphonies and an opera on the life of Polycarp of Smyrna, Fiery Chariots (1993). He also completed the first movement of Eduard Tubin's unfinished Symphony No. 11.
