= Alatskivi Landscape Conservation Area =

Protected area in Estonia

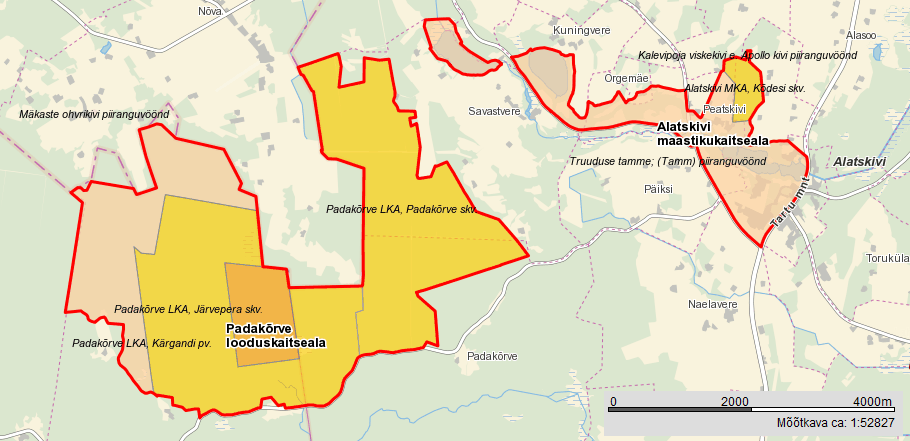

- Location within Estonia
- Location: Estonia
- Coordinates: 58°36′50″N 27°06′00″E
- Area: 383 ha (950 acres)
- Established: 1964 (2006)

Alatskivi Landscape Conservation Area is a nature park situated in Tartu County, Estonia.

Its area is 383 ha.

The protected area was designated in 1964 to protect Alatskivi region (including Kuningvere Lake). In 2006, the protected area was redesigned to the landscape conservation area.
