= Heljo Sepp =

Heljo Sepp (October 15, 1922, Valga, Estonia - November 27, 2015, Tallinn) was an Estonian pianist and music teacher, professor at the Estonian Academy of Music and Theatre.

After winning the International Youth Piano Competition, and the British Council's Music Prize, she was granted a 3-year scholarship for Royal Academy of Music. The study was interrupted by World War II. After the war she continued her studies at the Tallinn Conservatoire and the Moscow Conservatoire.

== Books ==
- Heino Elleri klaverilooming, Eesti Riiklik Kirjastus 1958
- Heino Eller sõnas ja pildis, Eesti Raamat 1967

== Music ==
- CD „Mängib Heljo Sepp / Performing Heljo Sepp“, Estonian Public Broadcasting (2010); Heljo Sepp (piano)
- CD „3 prelüüdi“, Estonian Academy of Music (2005); Heljo Sepp (piano)
- CD „Kodumaine viis“ [Native air], H. Sepp (2004); Heljo Sepp (piano)
- CD „Heljo Sepp“, Estonian Radio (1999); Heljo Sepp (piano)

== Awards ==
- 1957: Honored Artist of the Estonian SSR
- 1998: Heino Eller Music Prize
- 2004: Cultural Endowment of Estonia Performing Arts Award for long-term creative and pedagogical activity
