= Barbara von Tisenhusen =

1968 opera by Eduard Tubin

Barbara von Tisenhusen is an opera in three acts by Estonian composer Eduard Tubin. Tubin finished it in 1968. The libretto is by Jaan Kross, based on Aino Kallas' novel Barbara von Tisenhusen. The novel depicts events and human activities in 1551 in Tallinn.

The premiere was in June 1968 in the Estonia Theatre in Tallinn.
