= Johannes Bleive =

Estonian composer

Johannes Bleive (17 September 1909 Tartu – 16 May 1991 Tartu) was an Estonian composer.

In late 1920s and 1930s, he studied at Tartu Higher Music School. In 1939, he graduated from Tallinn Conservatory.

1940–1985, he was a music theory pedagogue in Heino Eller Tartu Music School.

== Works ==
- sonate "1. Piano Sonate" (1937)
- cantate "Ränduri laulud" (1939)
- cycle of piano "Mereetüüdid" (1963)
- cycle of songs "Sügisesed puud" (1963)
- piece for orchestra "Neoontulede mäng" (1973)
- oratorium "Sajanditest läbi" (1971)
