= Kratt (ballet) =

1943 ballet by Eduard Tubin

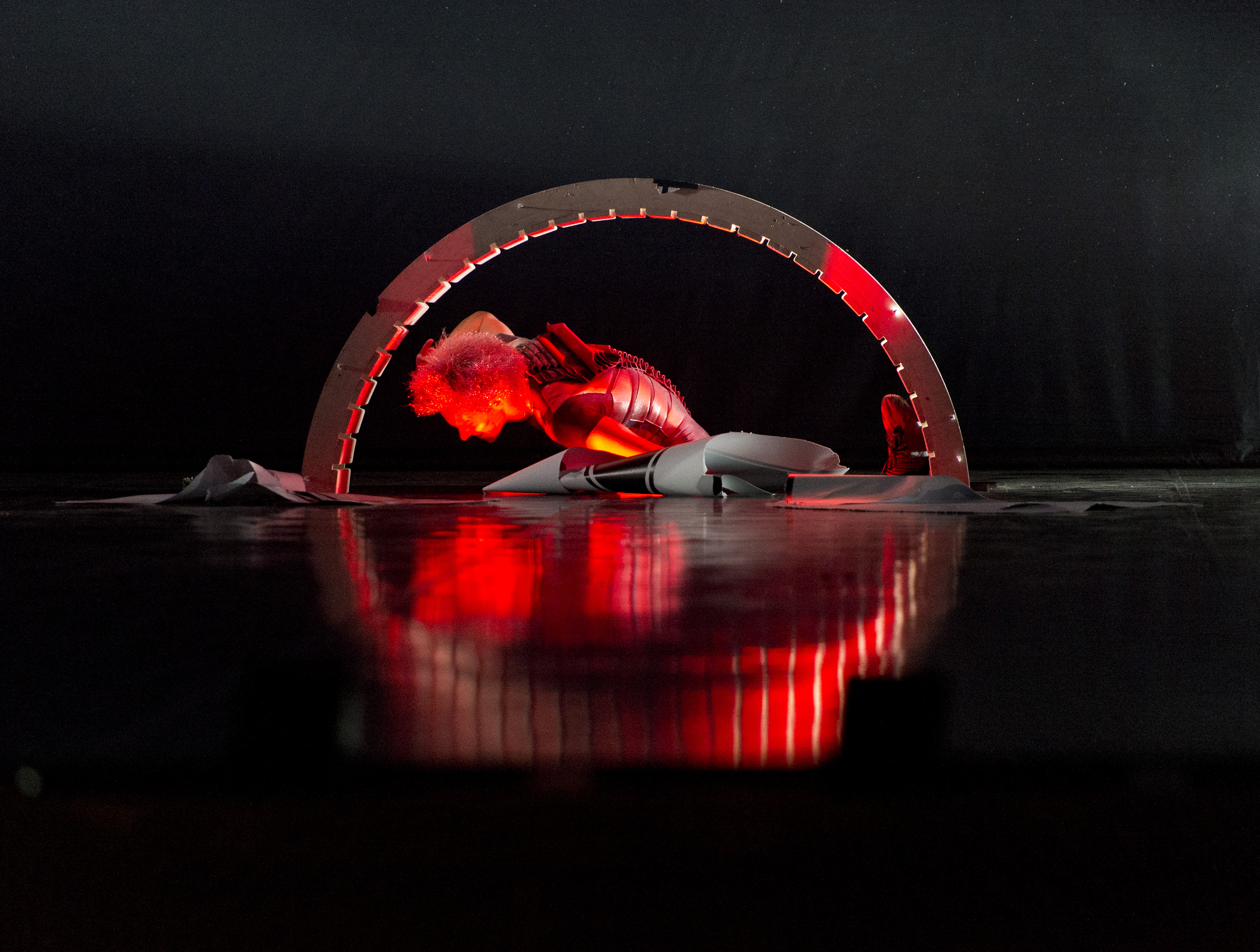
Kratt (2015)

Kratt is an Estonian ballet in four acts by Eduard Tubin. It is considered the first Estonian ballet. The libretto was written by Elfriede Saarik. The ballet is entirely based on folk tunes.

The premiere was on 31 March 1943 in Vanemuine Theatre. The ballet became infamous in Estonia due to the Soviet March Bombing of Tallinn in 1944, when the bombing started as the ballet was being performed at the Estonia Theatre, which was heavily damaged right after the theatre had been evacuated.

Tubin started to create the ballet already in 1938. A second version was created in 1940–1941, and a third version in 1960.

The work has been characterized as influenced by or even derivative of Igor Stravinsky's 1913 ballet The Rite of Spring.
