= Elfriede Saarik =

Estonian dancer and stage actress

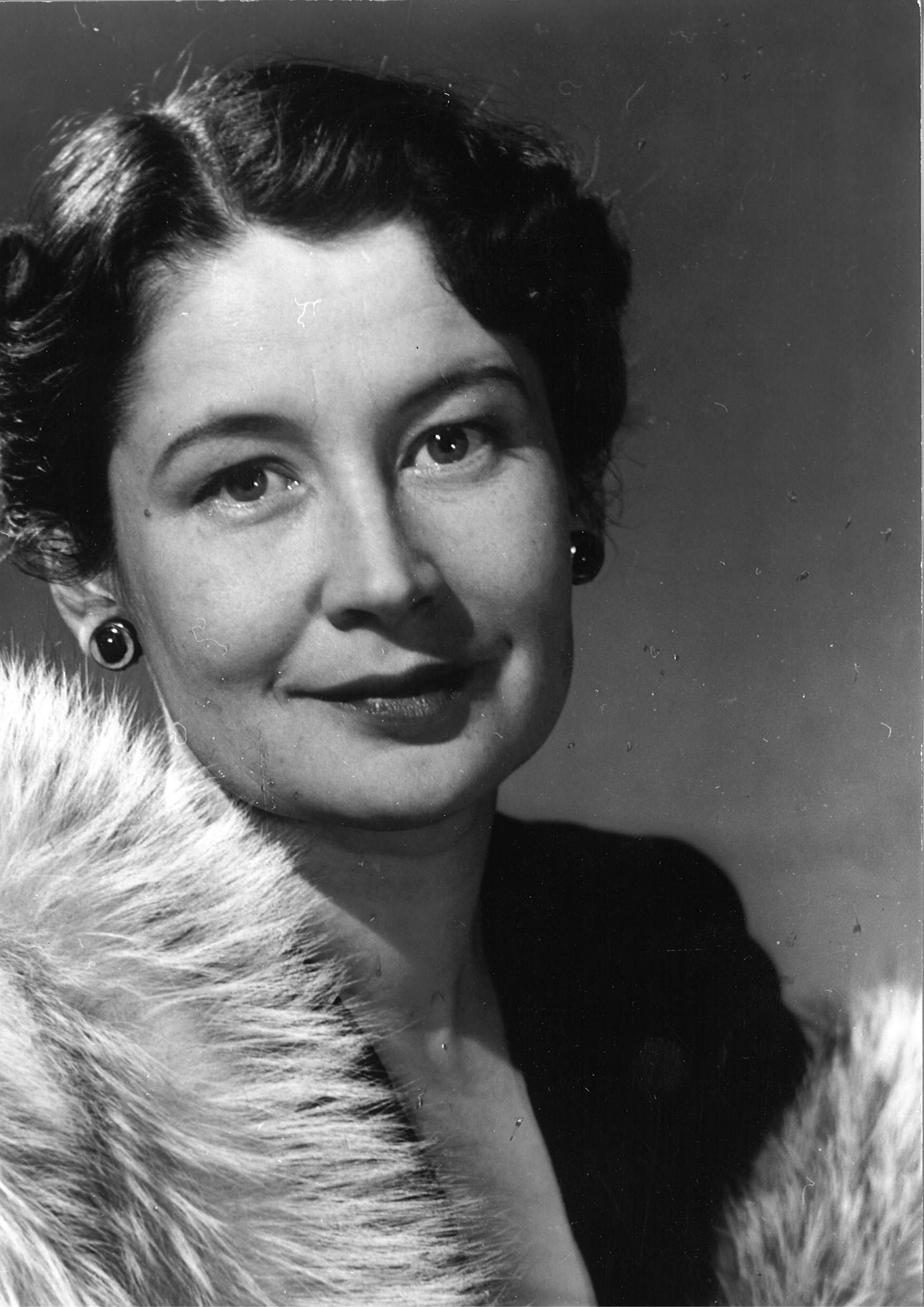
Elfriede Saarik

Erika Elfriede Elena Saarik (since 1941 Elfriede Tubin; 22 May 1916 – 22 October 1983) was an Estonian dancer and stage actress.

== Career ==
Elfriede Saarik was born in the Karkaraly District of Karaganda in Kazakhstan to Estonian parents. From 1935, she studied at Tiina Kapper Dance Studio and also studied piano and attended the drama study group at the Vanemuine theatre in Tartu. From 1935 until 1944, she was a dancer at the Vanemuine. In 1944, she fled the Soviet re-occupation of Estonia and fled to Sweden with her husband, composer and conductor Eduard Tubin and sons Rein and Eino, where she worked as a shop assistant and draughtsman.

She wrote the libretto for the ballet Kratt.

== Personal life ==
Saarik was married to composer Eduard Tubin. Their son is journalist Eino Tubin. Following her death, she was buried next to her husband in the Skogskyrkogården cemetery in Stockholm. On 4 June 2018, the remains of Saarik and Tubin were sent in urns to be interred at Tallinn's Forest Cemetery, where a memorial ceremony took place on 18 June 2018.
