= Väägvere =

Village in Estonia

- Village
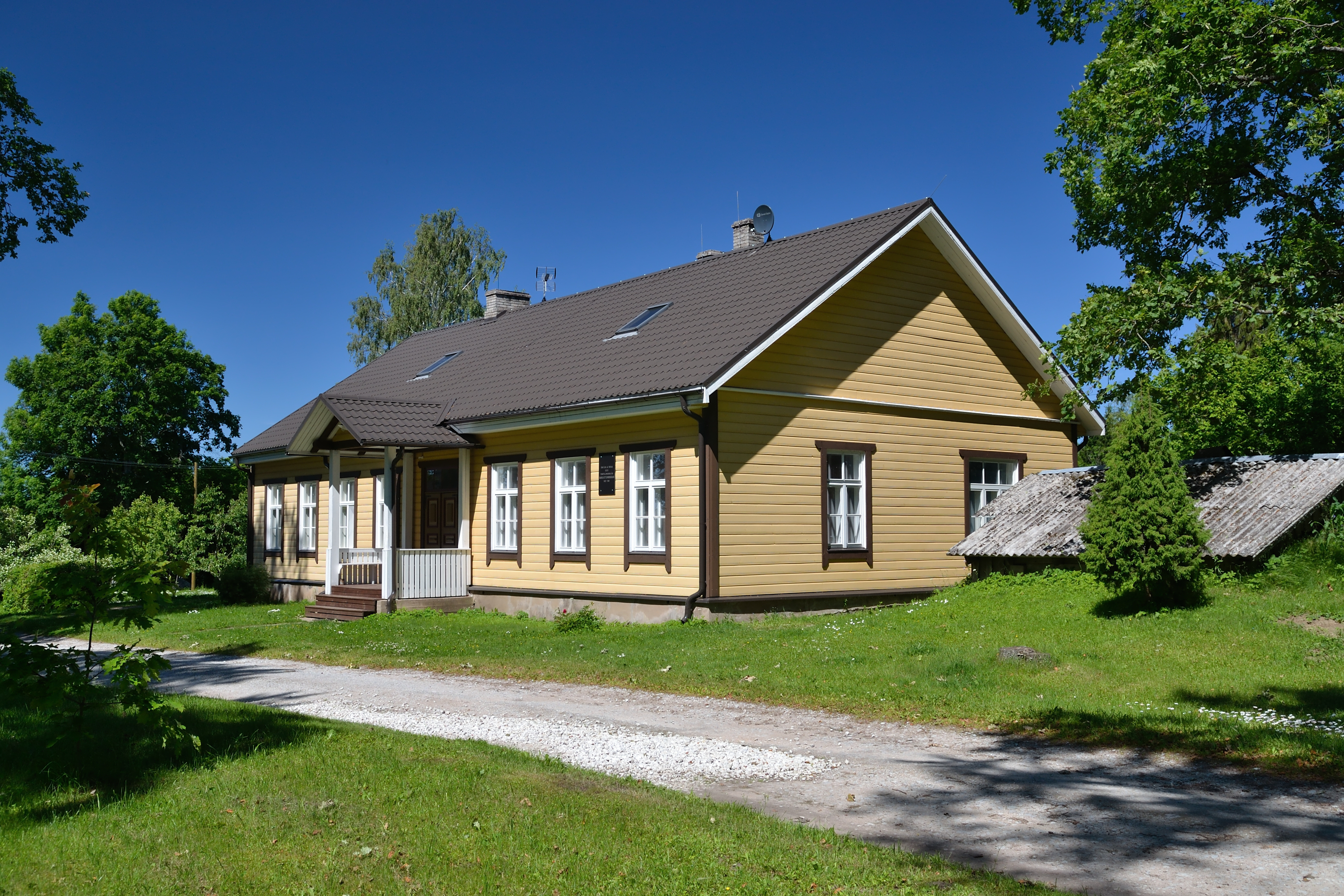
- Väägvere village schoolhouse

- Location within Estonia
- Coordinates: 58.469166666667°N 26.840833333333°E
- Country: Estonia
- County: Tartu County
- Parish: Tartu Parish
- Time zone: UTC+2 (EET)
  - Summer (DST): UTC+3 (EEST)

Väägvere is a village in Tartu Parish, Tartu County in Estonia.

Composer and double-bass player Ludvig Juht (1894–1957) was born in Väägvere.
