= Lake Alatskivi =

Lake in Estonia

- Alatskivi järv (Estonian)
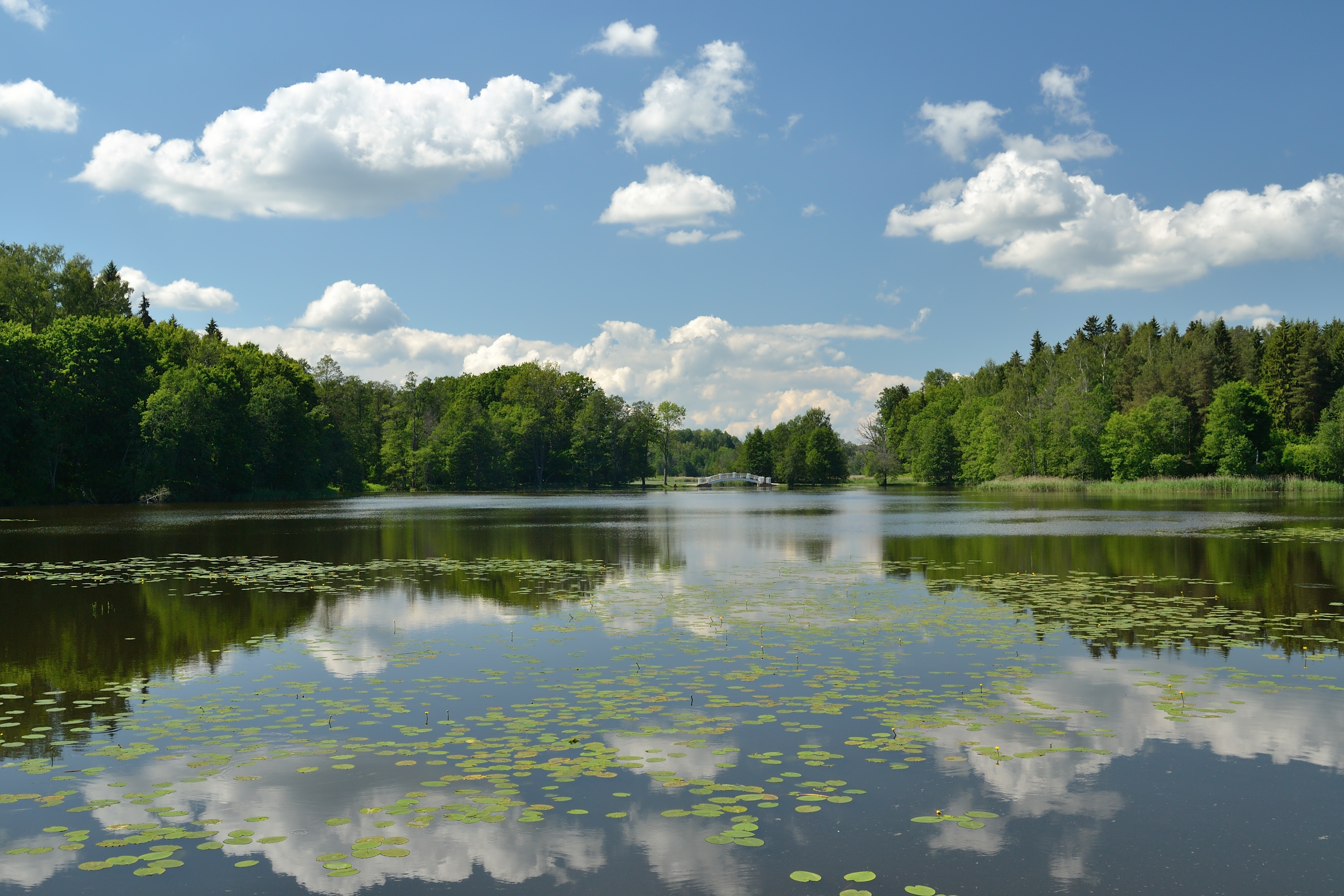

- Location within Estonia
- Coordinates: 58.606245°N 27.1281568°E
- Basin countries: Estonia
- Max. length: 1,220 meters (4,000 ft)
- Surface area: 23.1 hectares (57 acres)
- Shore length^{1}: 4,280 meters (14,040 ft)
- Surface elevation: 36.0 meters (118.1 ft)
- Islands: 6
- ^{1} Shore length is not a well-defined measure.

Lake Alatskivi (Estonian: Alatskivi järv or Alatskivi paisjärv) is a lake in Estonia. It is located in the settlements of Alatskivi and Peatskivi in Peipsiääre Parish, Tartu County.

== Physical description ==
The lake has an area of 23.1 hectares (57 acres), and it has six islands with a combined area of 1.2 hectares (3.0 acres). It is 1,220 meters (4,000 ft) long, and its shoreline measures 4,280 meters (14,040 ft).

== See also ==
- List of lakes of Estonia
