= Ludvig Juht =

Estonian musician

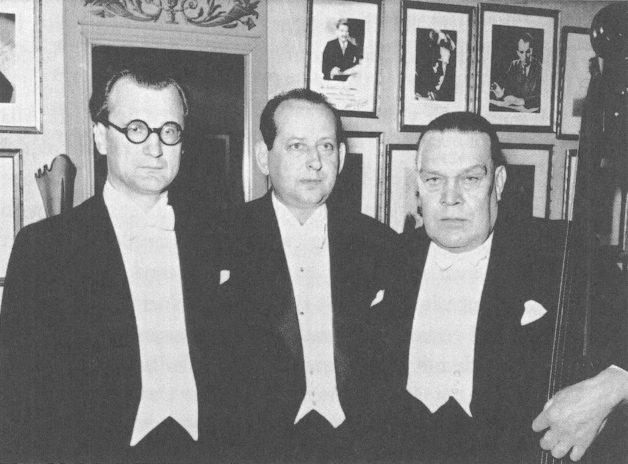
Conductor Olav Roots, composer Eduard Tubin and double-bassist Ludvig Juht in Stockholm Concert Hall in 1947

Ludvig Juht (24 July 1894 – 20 January 1957) was an Estonian double-bassist and composer.

Juht was born in Väägvere, Tartu County. In childhood he learned trombone and double bass under the guidance of David Otto Wirkhaus. From 1913 to 1914 he studied in Tartu. From 1916 to 1918 he played with the Helsinki City Orchestra. From 1918 to 1921 and from 1928 to 1929 he worked at the Estonia Theatre. He was a member of the Berlin Philharmonic Orchestra from 1921 until 1927 while concurrently studying composition at the Berlin Academy of Music under the instruction of Paul Juon. Between 1930 and 1932, he played with the London Savoy Orchestra, and from 1932 until 1933 he was a lecturer at the Riga Conservatory in Latvia.

In 1934, he moved to the United States. In United States he played with the Boston Symphony Orchestra.

In 1936, he established the Boston Estonian Society (Estonian: Bostoni Eesti Selts). From 1945 he was also a lecturer at the Boston University College of Music and from 1946 at the New England Conservatory.

He died on 20 January 1957 in Boston. He was married to Amanda Juht (1901–1988).

In 1939, he was awarded the Order of the Estonian Red Cross, fifth class.

== Works ==
- Kontrabassikontsert cis-moll (1932)
- Eesti tants sümfooniaorkestrile (1930)

=== For double bass and piano ===
- Legend Valuojast
- Mälestus
- Scherzo
- Adagio (seade kontrabassikontserdi cis-moll II osa)
