= Anna Eller =

Estonian pianist (1887–1942)

Anna Eller (born Anna Josefina Sofia Maria Fenrich von Gjurgjenovac, later Kremer, then Eller, December 24, 1887 – 1942) was an Estonian pianist. She was the first wife of the composer Heino Eller.

== Life ==
Anna Eller grew up in Warsaw, Poland, studying piano in private classes with Aleksander Michałowski. In 1906 she married her first husband, Rafael R. Kremer. In 1907 she moved to Saint Petersburg to study piano at Saint Petersburg Conservatory. She enrolled in the class of Nikolai Abramychev, and graduated in 1915. In 1908 she met Heino Eller, her lover and future husband, who studied violin at the same conservatory. After her graduation in 1915 she worked as a piano teacher in Tartu. In 1920 Anna Eller married to Heino Eller.

== Death ==
Anna Eller was arrested by the SS in June 1942, because of her Jewish ancestry, and was later executed.
