= Uderna =

Village in Estonia

- Village
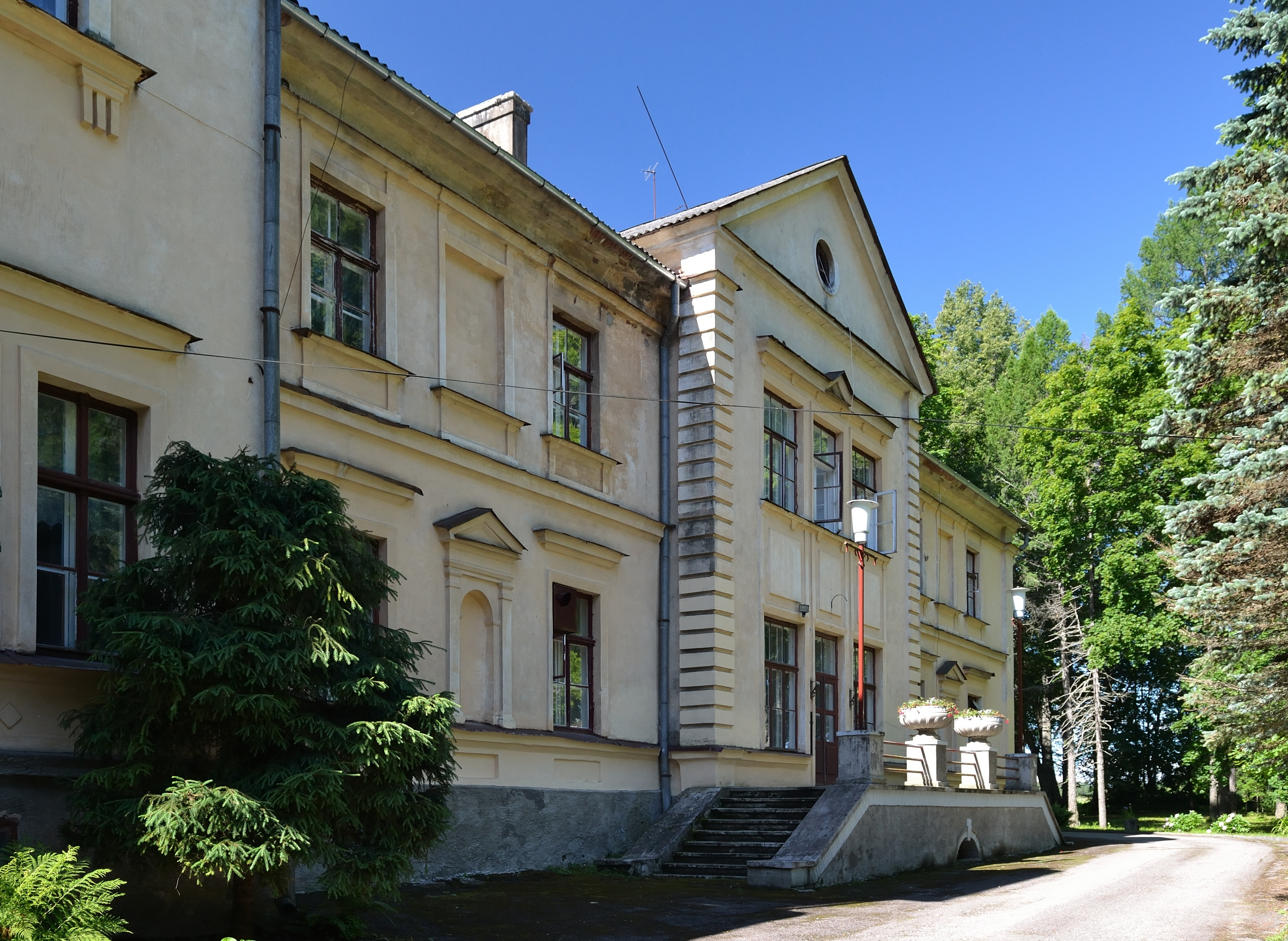
- Uderna manor

- Location in Estonia
- Coordinates: 58°11′12″N 26°23′30″E
- Country: Estonia
- County: Tartu County
- Municipality: Elva Parish

Population (01.01.2005)
  - Total: 61

Uderna is a village in Elva Parish, Tartu County in southern Estonia. It has a population of 61 (as of 1 January 2005).

== Uderna Manor ==
Uderna manor (German: Uddern) is mentioned for the first time in 1486 and belonged to the Tiesenhausen family during the Middle Ages. The current building dates from the 18th century but was substantially rebuilt around 1880 to its present look.

== Notable people ==
- Helmi Mäelo (1898–1978), writer and social activist
- Olav Roots (1910–1974), composer

== See also ==
- List of palaces and manor houses in Estonia
