= Olav Roots =

Estonian musician

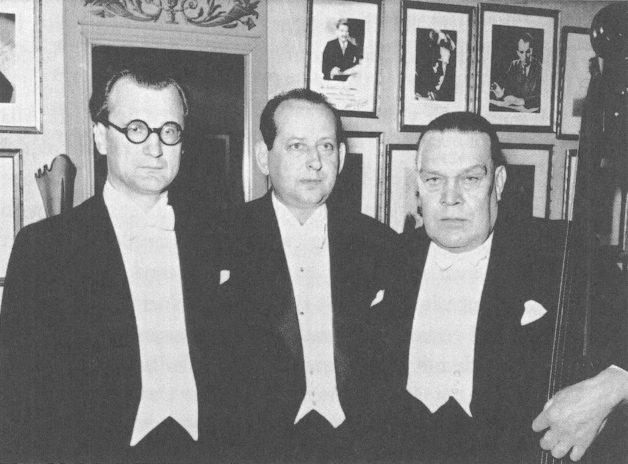
Conductor Olav Roots, composer Eduard Tubin and double-bassist Ludvig Juht in Stockholm Concert Hall in 1947

Olav Roots (26 February 1910 – 30 January 1974) was an Estonian conductor, pianist and composer.

== Biography ==
Roots was born in Uderna. He studied at the Music School of Tartu from 1923 to 1928, studying piano with Artur Lemba and composition under Heino Eller with musicians such as Eduard Tubin, Eduard Oja, Alfred Karindi and Karl Leichter. He then studied at the Estonian Music Academy in Tallinn, where he subsequently taught piano and music theory until 1935. In addition, he completed his piano studies with Alfred Cortot in Paris.

Until 1937, Roots led the Symphony Orchestra of the Conservatory of Tallinn. In 1937, a scholarship enabled him to study with Felix Weingartner in Vienna and attend summer courses with Nikolai Malko in Salzburg. In 1939 he became chief conductor of the Estonian Radio Orchestra. In 1942 he studied with Clemens Krauss in Salzburg.

In 1944, Roots moved to Sigtuna in Sweden. He taught there at the Estonian School and directed the Stockholm Joint Youth Choir. In November 1952 he became conductor of the National Symphony Orchestra of Colombia in Bogotá, Colombia, and taught at the Universidad Nacional de Colombia conservatory, also located in Bogotá, until his death in 1974, becoming its director. His Symphony dedicated to the Colombia Symphony Orchestra was first performed under his direction 10 November 1967, and he was made an Honorary citizen of Colombia the same year. The Eduard Tubin Museum of Alatskivi Castle today contains exhibits related to Roots and his fellow students of the Tartu music school.

He died in Bogotá.
