= Karl Leichter =

Estonian musicologist (1902–1987)

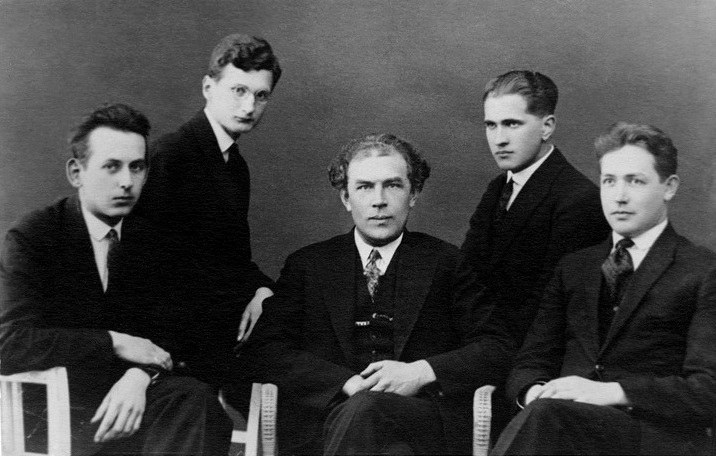
Karl Leichter with other composers from the Tartu school of composition in 1930. Left to right: Eduard Tubin, Olav Roots, Heino Eller, Leichter and Alfred Karindi.

Karl Leichter (13 October 1902 in Näpi, Rakvere Parish – 7 March 1987 in Tallinn) was an Estonian musicologist. In 1929 he graduated in theory and composition, studying under Heino Eller with pupils such as Eduard Tubin, Alfred Karindi, Eduard Oja and Olav Roots. Between 1929 and 1931 he worked in the Estonian Folklore Archives.

Following World War II and the ensuing Soviet occupation of Estonia, he worked hard to re-establish functioning musical education and musicological research. For a short period, he was dean of Tallinn State Conservatory, but quickly lost his position due to political reasons. Only after Stalin's death could he slowly work his way back to a position as a teacher and eventually as the Chair of the Department of Composition and Musicology.

He later worked in Stockholm and Helsinki. The Eduard Tubin Museum of Alatskivi Castle today contains exhibits related to him and his other peers who studied with him at the Tartu school.

His large archive of correspondence with many important musicians throughout Estonia and abroad, including Elmar Arro, was donated by his widow to the Estonian Museum of Theatre and Music in the 1990s.
