= Heino Eller =

Estonian composer (1887–1970)

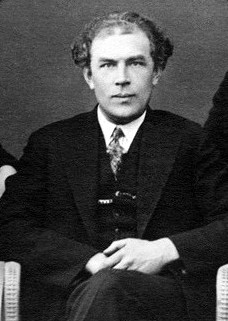
- Eller in 1930s
- Born: Heinrich Eller; 7 March 1887; Dorpat, Governorate of Livonia, Russian Empire (present-day Tartu, Estonia)
- Died: 16 June 1970 (aged 83); Tallinn, then part of Estonian SSR, Soviet Union
- Occupations: Composer; pedagogue
- Spouses: Anna Eller (m. 1920; died 1942); Ellu Eller (m. 1948)

Heino Eller (7 March 1887 – 16 June 1970) was an Estonian composer and pedagogue, known as the founder of contemporary Estonian symphonic music.

== Life and career ==
Eller was born in Tartu on 7 March 1887, where he took private lessons in violin and music theory, played in several ensembles and orchestras, and performed as violin soloist. In 1907 he entered the Saint Petersburg Conservatory to study violin. From 1908 to 1911 he was a law student. In 1920 Eller graduated from the conservatory renamed to Petrograd Conservatory. His younger brother was sculptor Aleksander Eller.

From 1920 to 1940, Eller was a professor of music theory and composition at the Tartu Higher School for Music. During this time he formed the Tartu school of composition, which gave rise to many composers, including Eduard Tubin. In 1940 he became a professor of composition at the Tallinn Conservatory and taught there until his death in 1970.

Eller was a teacher of composition. The school he formed in Tartu counterbalanced the so-called Tallinn school headed by Artur Kapp. Eller's pedagogical talent is versatile. The list of his pupils offers the best proof of this: each of them has created a distinguished original style. Among his students were Els Aarne, Anatoli Garšnek, Alfred Karindi, Villem Kapp, Boris Kõrver, Karl Leichter, Leo Normet, Uno Naissoo, Eduard Oja, Valter Ojakäär, Arne Oit, Arvo Pärt, Boris Parsadanian, Alo Põldmäe, Kaljo Raid, Jaan Rääts, Olav Roots, Heljo Sepp, Lepo Sumera and Eduard Tubin.

== Family ==
Heino Eller was married to pianist Anna Kremer, who was executed at a concentration camp by German occupational authorities in 1942 because of her Jewish ethnicity.

== Selected works ==
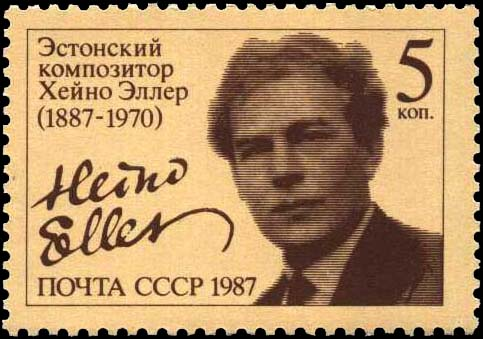
Eller on a 1987 USSR stamp

Eller primarily composed instrumental music. His symphonic works, especially Koit and Videvik, break new ground for Estonian symphonic music. His musical language contains many national traits, but he was influenced by 20th-century styles as diverse as impressionism and expressionism.

- Koit (Dawn), tone poem (1915–1918, 1920)
- Videvik (Twilight), tone poem (1917)
- Moderato sostenuto in D minor for voice, viola and piano (1921)
- Elegia for harp and string orchestra (1931)
- Concerto in B minor for violin and orchestra (1937)
- Five Pieces for string orchestra (1953)
