= Eduard Oja =

Estonian composer and conductor

- Born: 17 January 1905; Palupõhja, Governorate of Livonia, Russian Empire
- Died: 16 April 1950 (aged 45); Tartu, then part of Estonian SSR, Soviet Union
- Occupations: Composer, conductor, music teacher and critic
- Years active: 1925-1950
- Spouse: Adele-Marie Oja

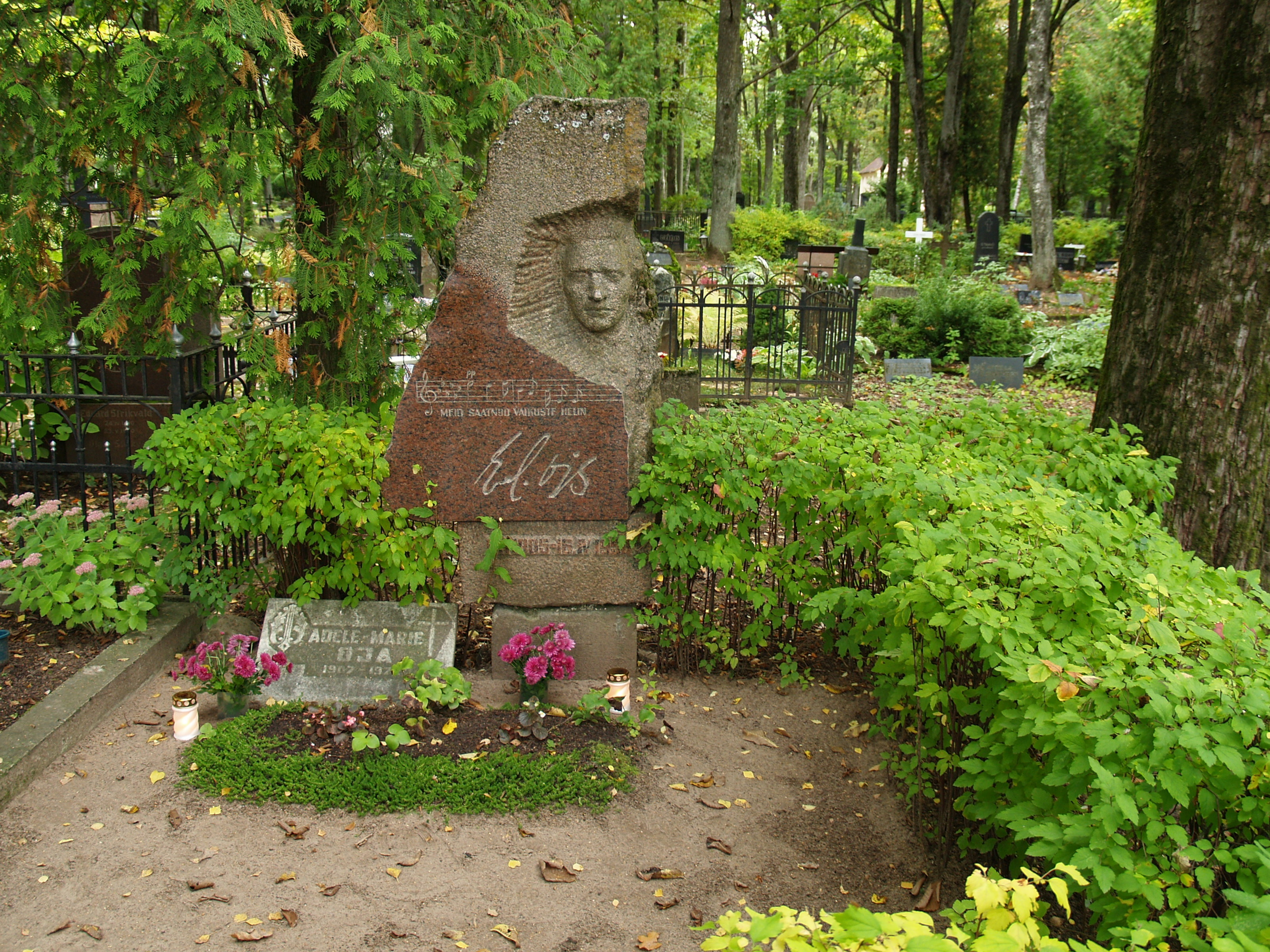
Eduard Oja grave in Tartu

Eduard Oja (17 January 1905 in Palupõhja – 16 April 1950 in Tartu) was an Estonian composer, conductor, music teacher and critic. His father was a forest warden. Between 1919 and 1925 he studied at Tartu Teachers' College at Tartu University, where he met Eduard Tubin, and he also worked for some time as a school teacher. He was not a particularly prolific composer, composing mainly orchestral and ensemble works and choral music. He was however much appreciated during his lifetime, and received awards and acclaim for several of his works. He also worked as a conductor, leading the Tartu Women's Singing Society's Women's Choir between 1930 and 1934, as well as a teacher of music theory at Tartu Higher School of Music. In addition, he was himself a practising violinist. A number of his works such as the opera Oath Redeemed (Estonian: Lunastatud vanne) and the choral work The Return Home (Estonian: Kojuminek) have been lost, although the majority of his work has survived, and is valued in museums in Estonia today. The Eduard Tubin Museum of Alatskivi Castle contains exhibits related to him and his fellow students under Heino Eller, known as the "Tartu school", such as Eduard Tubin, Alfred Karindi, Olav Roots and Karl Leichter.
