= Alfred Karindi =

Estonian organist and composer

- Born: Alfred-Nikolai Karafin; 30 May 1901; Kõnnu, Illuka Parish, Governorate of Estonia, Russian Empire
- Died: 13 April 1969 (aged 67); Tallinn, then part of Estonian SSR, Soviet Union
- Occupations: Organist, composer

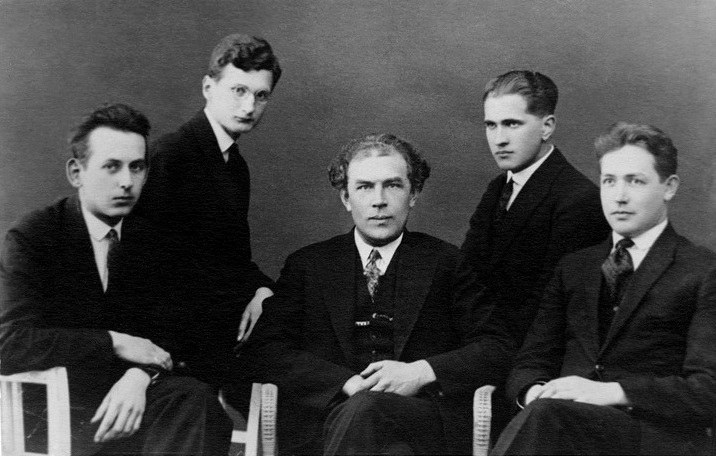
Alfred Karindi (far right) with other composers from the Tartu school of composition (left to right): Eduard Tubin, Olav Roots, Heino Eller and Karl Leichter.

Alfred Karindi (born Alfred-Nikolai Karafin; 30 May 1901 – 13 April 1969) was an Estonian organist and composer.

== Life and work ==
Alfred Karindi was born on 30 May 1901 in the village of Kõnnu, Illuka Parish. In 1920 he entered the Tartu Higher School of Music where he studied organ under Johannes Kärt and composition under Heino Eller. He graduated in 1927, and then studied under August Topman and Artur Kapp as an external student of organ and composition at Tallinn Conservatory, graduating in 1931. He belonged to the "Tartu school" of musicians who studied under Heino Eller, others being Eduard Tubin, Eduard Oja, Olav Roots and Karl Leichter.

Karindi taught music at the Tartu 2nd primary school (1921–1927), Tartu Higher Music School (1925–1928) and University of Tartu (1928–1932). Karindi was organist for Tartu Maarja Church (1925–1929), University of Tartu Church (1929–1933) and Tallinn Kaarli Church (1933–1940). He was known as a skilled improviser on the organ. He also conducted a number of choirs in Tartu and Tallinn from 1925 onward. As conductor of the "Cantate Domino" mixed choir of the University of Tartu Church from 1929 to 1933 he gave concerts throughout Estonia, often performing Mozart's Requiem.

Karindi began teaching theory and organ at Tallinn State Conservatory in 1940. In 1944 he was made head of the theory department and in 1946 he was made a professor. He was again organist at Tallinn Kaarli Church in 1948. He was arrested by the Soviet authorities in 1950 and held in a prison camp in Mordovia until 1954, when he was allowed to return home. From 1955 to 1969 he was again a professor at Tallinn State Conservatory. In 1957 he founded Mixed Choir of Graduates of Higher Schools and was its principal conductor for the rest of his life. Karandi wrote music for choirs, organ music, solo songs, chamber pieces, orchestral music and major vocal symphonic works. His songs are serious and complex, and are not performed often. His "Lullaby", the second part of his Third Organ Sonata, is very popular.

Alfred Karindi died in Tallinn on 13 April 1969. A memorial tablet was erected in 1986 in his home village of Kõnnu.
