= Eduard Tubin =

Estonian composer and conductor

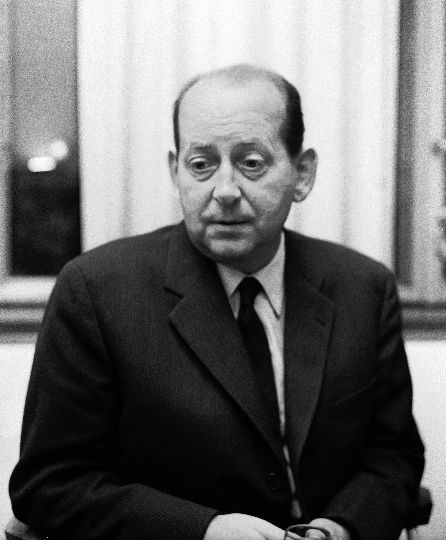
- 1958
- Born: 18 June 1905; Torila, Tartu County, Governorate of Livonia, Russian Empire
- Died: 17 November 1982 (aged 77); Stockholm, Sweden
- Occupations: Composer, conductor
- Years active: 1932–1982
- Spouses: Linda Pirn; Elfriede Saarik

Eduard Tubin (18 June [O.S. 5 June] 1905 – 17 November 1982) was an Estonian composer, conductor, and choreographer.

== Life ==
Tubin was born in Torila, Tartu County, Governorate of Livonia, then part of the Russian Empire. Both his parents were music lovers, and his father played trombone in the village band. His first taste of music came at school where he learned the flute. Later, his father swapped a cow for a piano, and the young Eduard soon became known in the village for his playing. Eduard also played flute in the village orchestra.

Tubin entered the Tartu Teacher's College in the newly independent Estonia in 1920. It was here he began to take an interest in composition. In 1924 he was admitted to the Tartu Higher Music School starting his studies under the guidance of the famous Estonian composer Heino Eller. He married a fellow student Linda Pirn in 1930. Their son Rein was born in 1932. Tubin took up work conducting in the Vanemuine theatre. During this time he also conducted one of the best-known male choirs and made several trips abroad. In 1938, he met Zoltán Kodály in Hungary, who encouraged his interest in folk songs. In 1941, he married the ballet dancer Elfriede Saarik (Erika). Their son Eino was born in 1942.

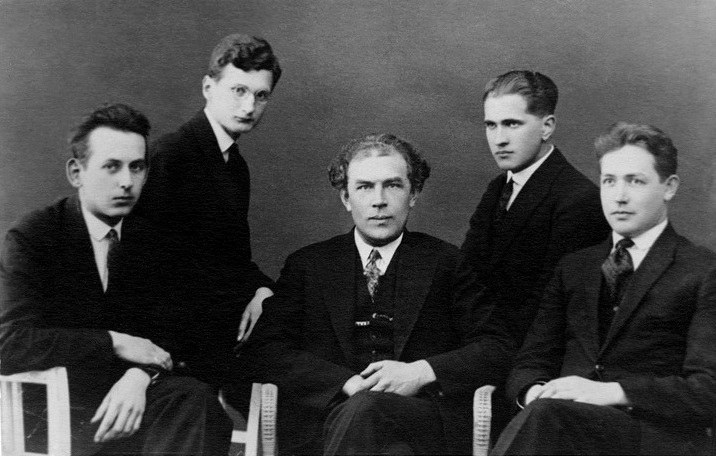
Eduard Tubin (far left) with other Estonian composers of the Tartu school of composition (left to right): Olav Roots, Heino Eller, Karl Leichter and Alfred Karindi, circa 1930.

In 1944, Tubin fled from the Soviet invasion of Estonia to Sweden with his wife Erika and sons Rein and Eino. He settled in Stockholm, and became a Swedish citizen in 1961 (after that he was able to visit Soviet-occupied Estonia on several occasions). He was offered work at the historical Drottningholm Palace Theatre restoring old operas. This left him time to devote himself to his own composition. Here he wrote most of his greatest works, including two operas, symphonies 5–10, a second concerto for violin, one concerto for double-bass and one for balalaika, a piano concertino, much piano and violin music, choir and solo songs etc. Towards the end of his life, Tubin slowly began to gain recognition, particularly after the conductor Neeme Järvi, also an Estonian, had escaped from the USSR to the United States in 1980. In the last year of his life his Tenth Symphony was performed on 5 concerts by the Boston Symphony Orchestra. Tubin received several Swedish music awards and was elected member of the Royal Swedish Academy of Music. After a long illness he died on 17 November 1982 in Stockholm.

== Style ==
Tubin often used Estonian folk music in his works, for instance in the Sinfonietta on Estonian motifs. His ballet Kratt is entirely based on folk tunes. In 1938 Tubin had visited the Estonian island of Hiiumaa to collect folk songs. Tubin was also a very good orchestrator, and this can be heard particularly in the Third and Fourth symphonies.

A change took place in Tubin's style at the end of the 1940s; the music became harmonically more astringent. The finale of the seventh symphony makes much use of a theme with all twelve notes, though it is tonal. The shift to a less nationalistic and more international style came after Tubin had fled Estonia to Sweden.

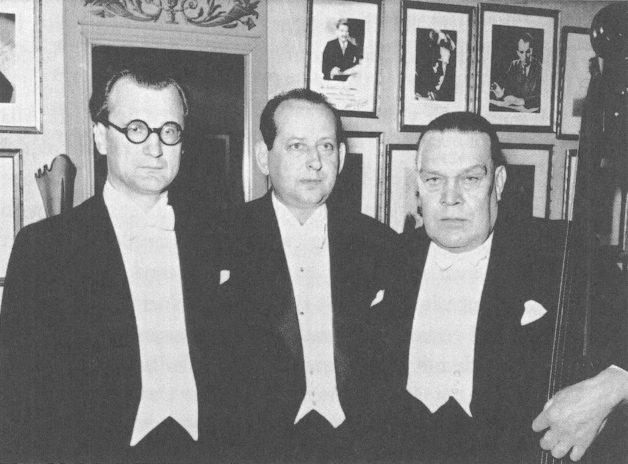
Conductor Olav Roots, Eduard Tubin and double-bassist Ludvig Juht in Stockholm Concert Hall in 1947.

Tubin is perhaps not better known because of his displacement. Although Estonia claims him as one of their greatest composers, most of his composing was done in Sweden, which never gave him the attention he was due. Tubin is gaining recognition, however, particularly for his later symphonies and the Second Piano Sonata, which are recognised as masterpieces. Most of his works have been recorded (there are two complete recorded sets of his symphonies, conducted by Neeme Järvi and Arvo Volmer). In June 2005 the city of Tallinn observed the centennial of his birth with a festival where all of his symphonies and much of his piano and chamber music was performed. A statue of Tubin was erected in Tartu.

A Tubin Museum was opened at Alatskivi Castle near his birthplace in 2011. This has an exhibition about the composer and other members of the "Tartu school" of musicians who studied under Heino Eller including Alfred Karindi, Eduard Oja, Olav Roots and Karl Leichter. The International Eduard Tubin Society was founded in Estonia in 2000. Its most important task is to produce an academically correct edition of his collected works, a work which is well in progress.

The pianist Vardo Rumessen was considered the foremost interpreter of Tubin's works.

== Selected works ==
Orchestra

- Symphony No. 1 in C minor (1931–1934)
- Symphony No. 2 in B minor "Legendary" (1937)
- Symphony No. 3 in D minor "Heroic" (1940–1942, revised 1968)
- Symphony No. 4 in A "Lyrical" (1943, revised 1978)
- Symphony No. 5 in B minor (1946)
- Symphony No. 6 (1953–1954, revised 1956) (first version premiered September 1955 by Tor Mann)
- Symphony No. 7 (1955–1958)
- Symphony No. 8 (1965–1966)
- Symphony No. 9 "Sinfonia semplice" (1969)
- Symphony No. 10 (1973)
- Symphony No. 11 (incomplete)
- Suite on Estonian Themes (1929–30)
- Toccata (1937)
- Estonian Dance Suite (1938)
- Prelude Solennel (1940)
- Sinfonietta on Estonian Motifs (1940)
- Music for Strings (1962–1963)

Concertante

- Violin Concerto No. 1 in D major (1941–1942)
- Concertino for Piano and Orchestra (1944–1945)
- Violin Concerto No. 2 in G minor (1945)
- Double Bass Concerto (1948)
- Cello Concerto (unfinished - piano score, 1954–1955)
- Balalaika Concerto (1963–1964)

Opera, ballet and choral works

- Kratt, ballet in 4 acts (1938–1940, 2nd version 1940–1941, 3rd version 1959–1960); libretto Erika Saarik
- Inauguration Cantata for baritone, reciter, chorus and orchestra (1958)
- Barbara von Tisenhusen, opera in 3 acts (1967–1968); libretto Jaan Kross after a short story by Aino Kallas
- The Parson of Reigi (Reigi õpetaja), opera (1970–1971); libretto Aino Kallas, completed by Jaan Kross
- Requiem for Fallen Soldiers (1950, rev. 1979); text by Henrik Visnapuu and Marie Under

Chamber music

- Piano Sonata No.1 (1928)
- Piano Sonata No. 2 "Northern Lights" (1950)
- Violin Sonata No.1 (1934–1936, revised 1968–1969)
- Capriccio No.1 for Violin and Piano (1937, revised 1971)
- Pastorale for Viola and Organ (1956)
- Viola Sonata (1964–1965)
- Alto Saxophone Sonata (1951)
- Piano Quartet in C♯ minor (ETW 59, 1929–30)
- String Quartet (ETW 64, 1979)
