= Alatskivi =

Borough in Estonia

- Small borough
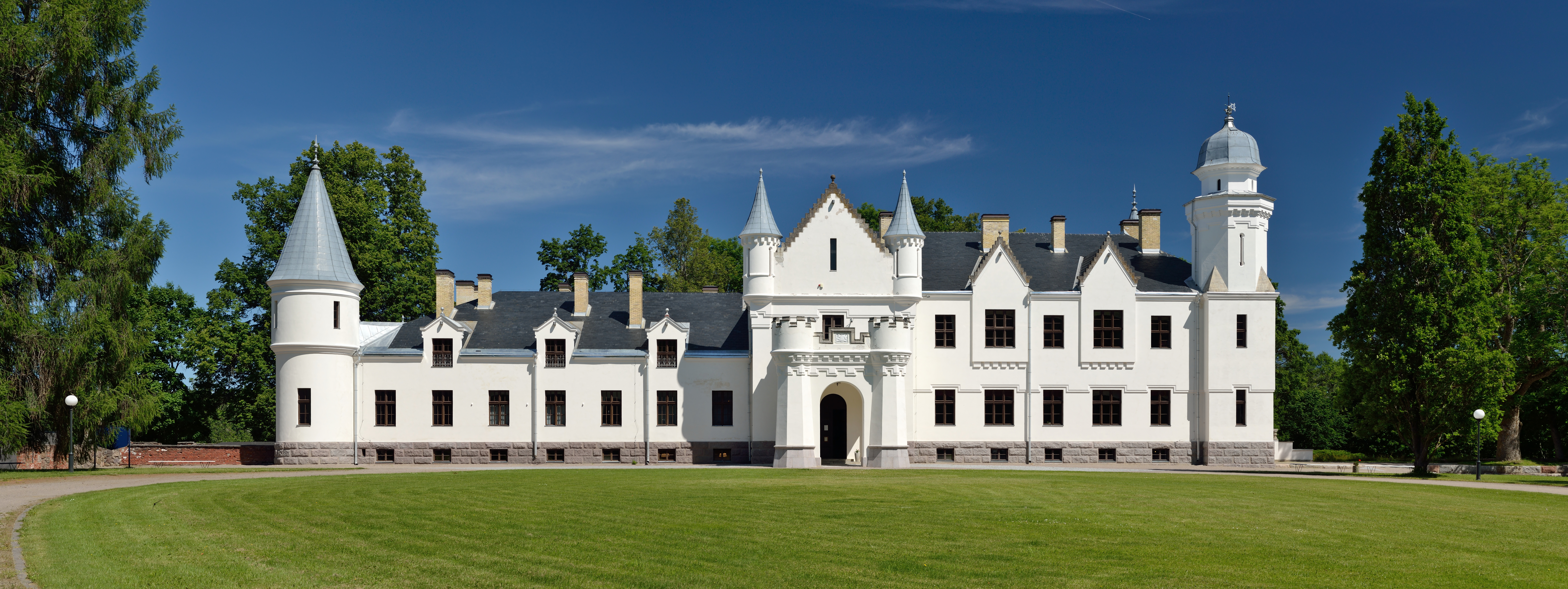
- Alatskivi Castle

- Location in Estonia
- Coordinates: 58°35′59″N 27°08′00″E
- Country: Estonia
- County: Tartu County
- Municipality: Peipsiääre Parish

Alatskivi (German: Allatzkiwwi) is a small borough (Estonian: alevik) in Peipsiääre Parish, Tartu County Estonia. It was the administrative centre of Alatskivi Parish before the Estonian administrative reform. Alatskivi had around 382 citizens in as of 2019 with an area of 1.9 square km².

The main sight in Alatskivi is the gothic-style castle of a local manor.

== People ==
- Juhan Liiv (1864–1913), the poet, was born in Alatskivi.

== Gallery ==
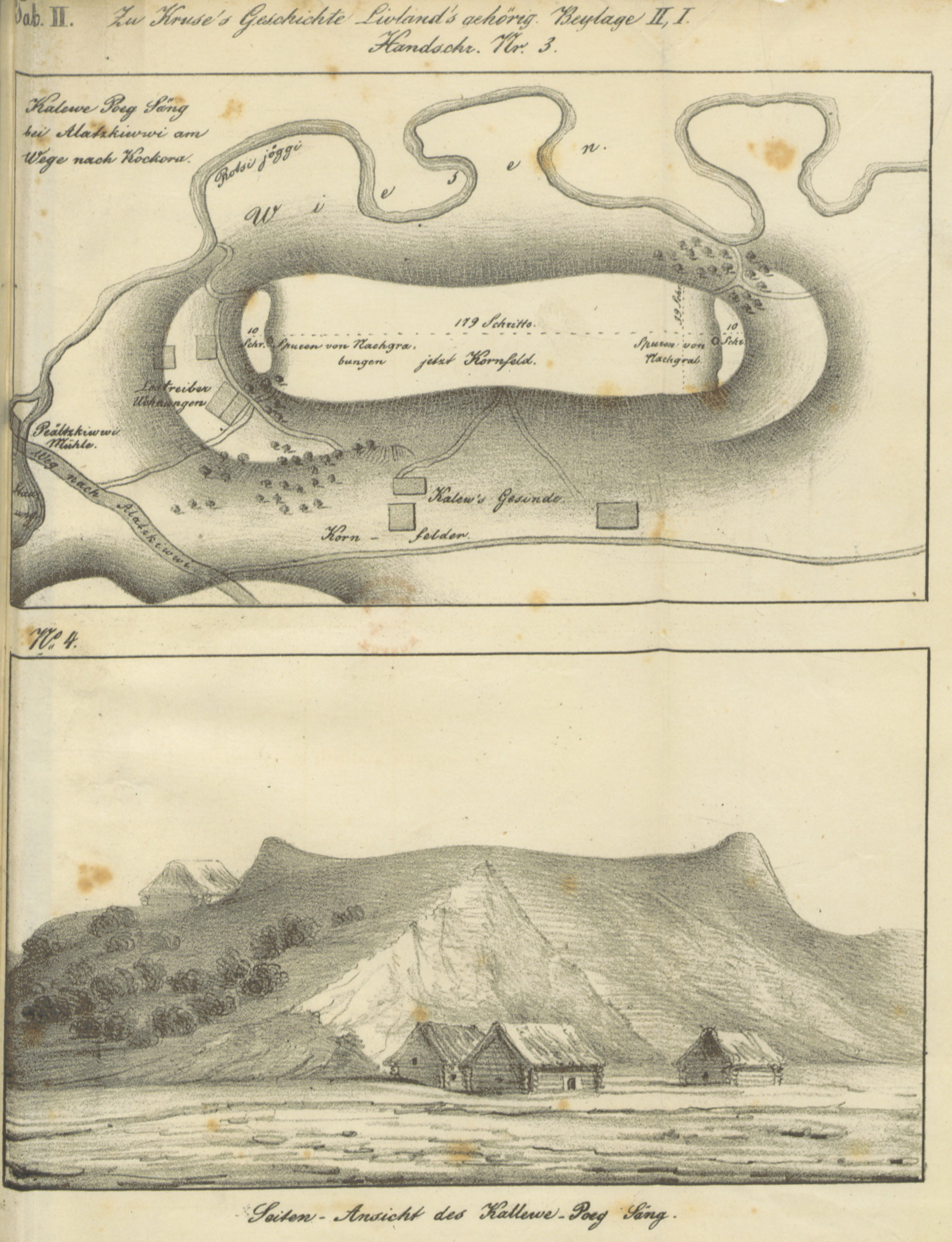
«Kaleve Poeg» Remains of an Estonian cult place (1846 by KRUSE)

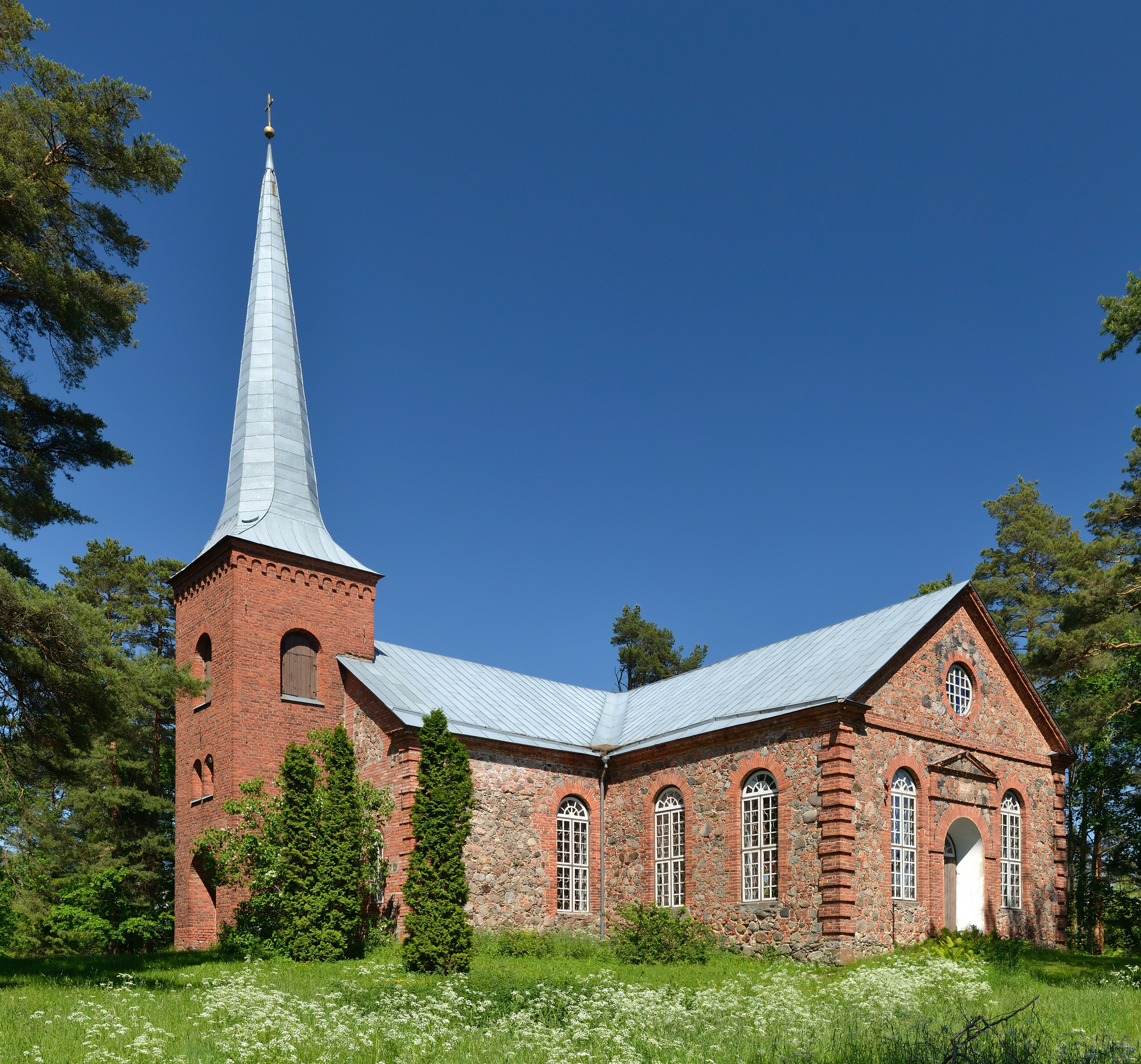
Alatskivi church

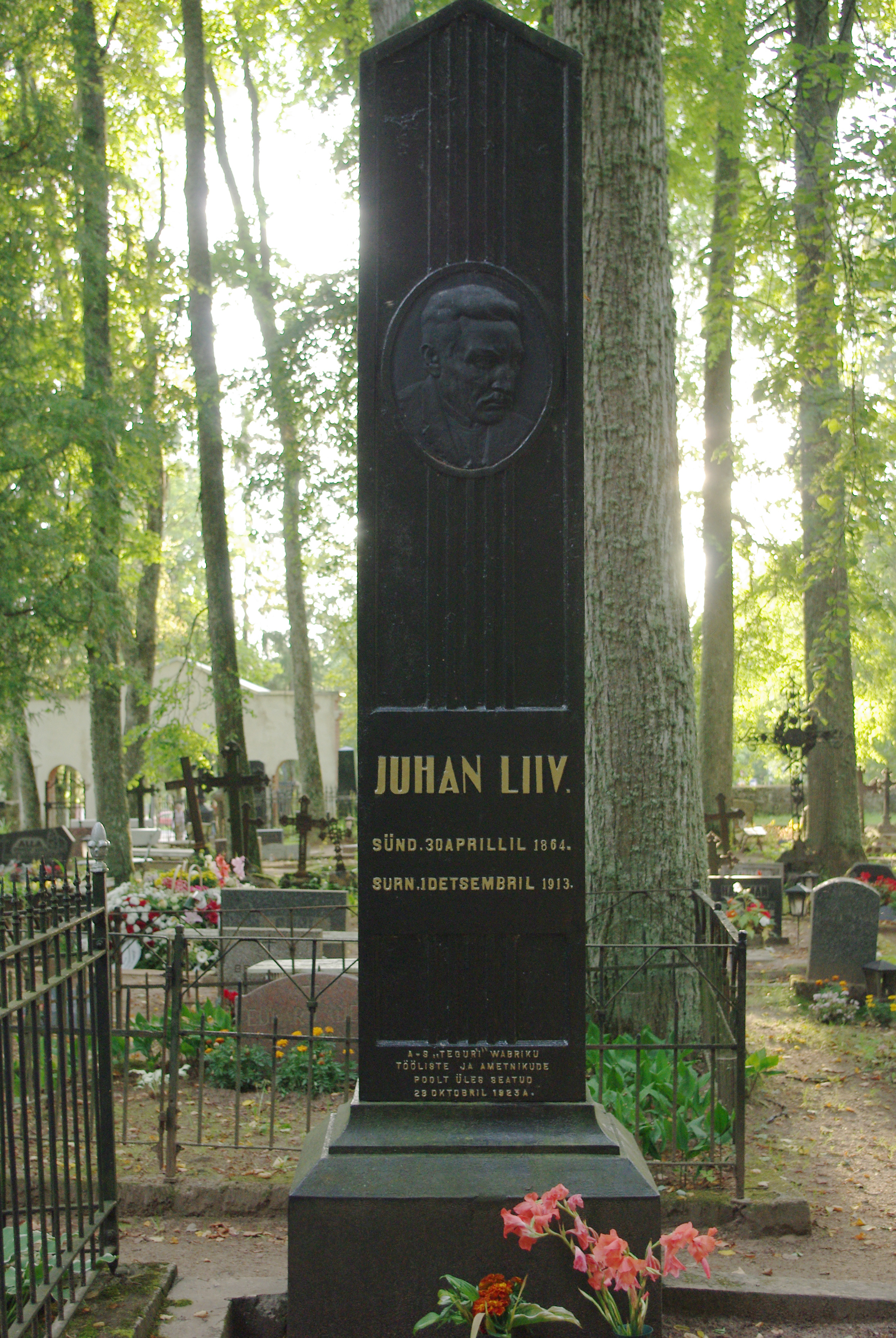
Grave of Juhan Liiv in Alatskivi cemetery
