= Poul Henningsen =

Danish author, critic, architect, and designer

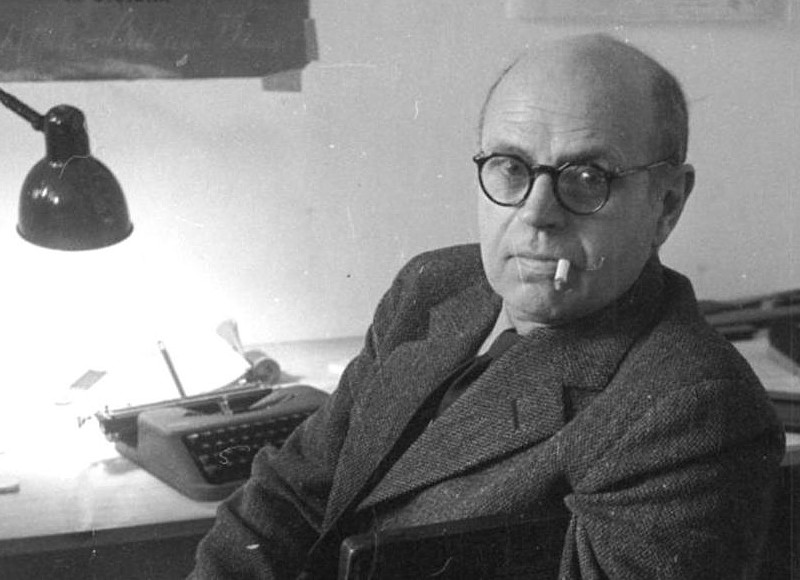
- Born: 9 September 1894; Ordrup, Denmark
- Died: 31 January 1967 (aged 72); Hillerød, Denmark
- Resting place: Bispebjerg Cemetery
- Other name: PH
- Education: Technical University of Denmark
- Occupations: Author, critic, journalist, architect, designer, and film director
- Notable work: PH5 Lamp PH Artichoke Lamp PH Grand Piano
- Style: Modernism
- Spouses: Else Strøyberg (m. 1919; div. 1942); Inger Andersen (m. 1943)
- Partner: Besse Giersing
- Children: Sten Hegeler Simon P. Henningsen Berta Henningsen
- Parents: Carl Ewald (father); Agnes Henningsen (mother)

Poul Henningsen (9 September 1894 – 31 January 1967) was a Danish author, critic, architect, and designer. In Denmark, where he often is referred to simply as PH, he was one of the leading figures of the cultural life of Denmark between the World Wars.

He is most associated with his design of the PH-lamp series of glare-free, shaded lamps. His lamps used carefully analyzed reflecting and baffling of the light rays from the bulb to achieve illumination that was not harsh and glaring but shed warm, soft light. His light fixtures were manufactured by Danish lighting manufacturer Louis Poulsen, a company with which Henningsen would build a lifelong working relationship. His novel works of Danish modern designs are featured in many museums.

== Biography ==
=== Early life and education ===
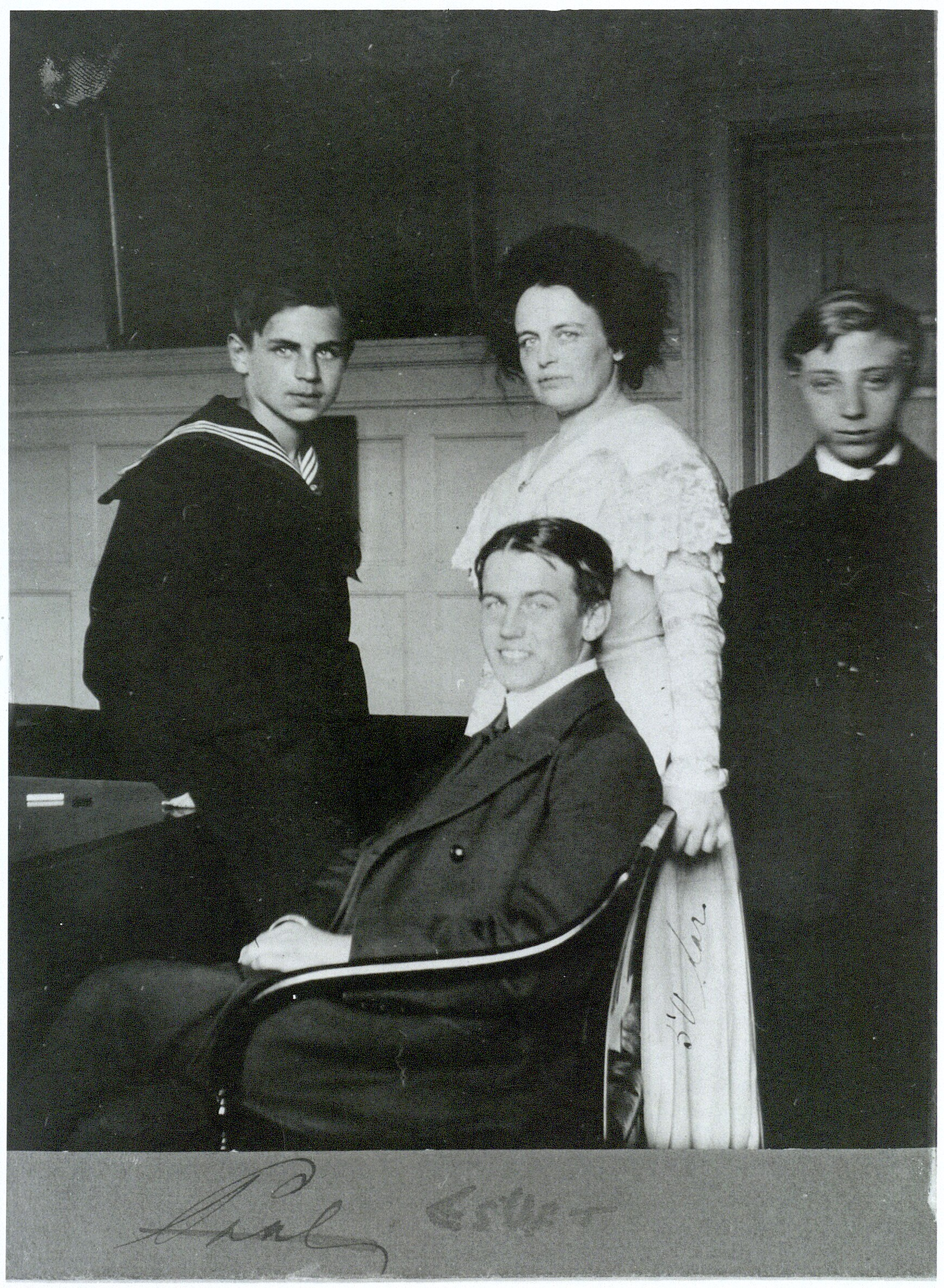
Poul Henningsen (left) with family

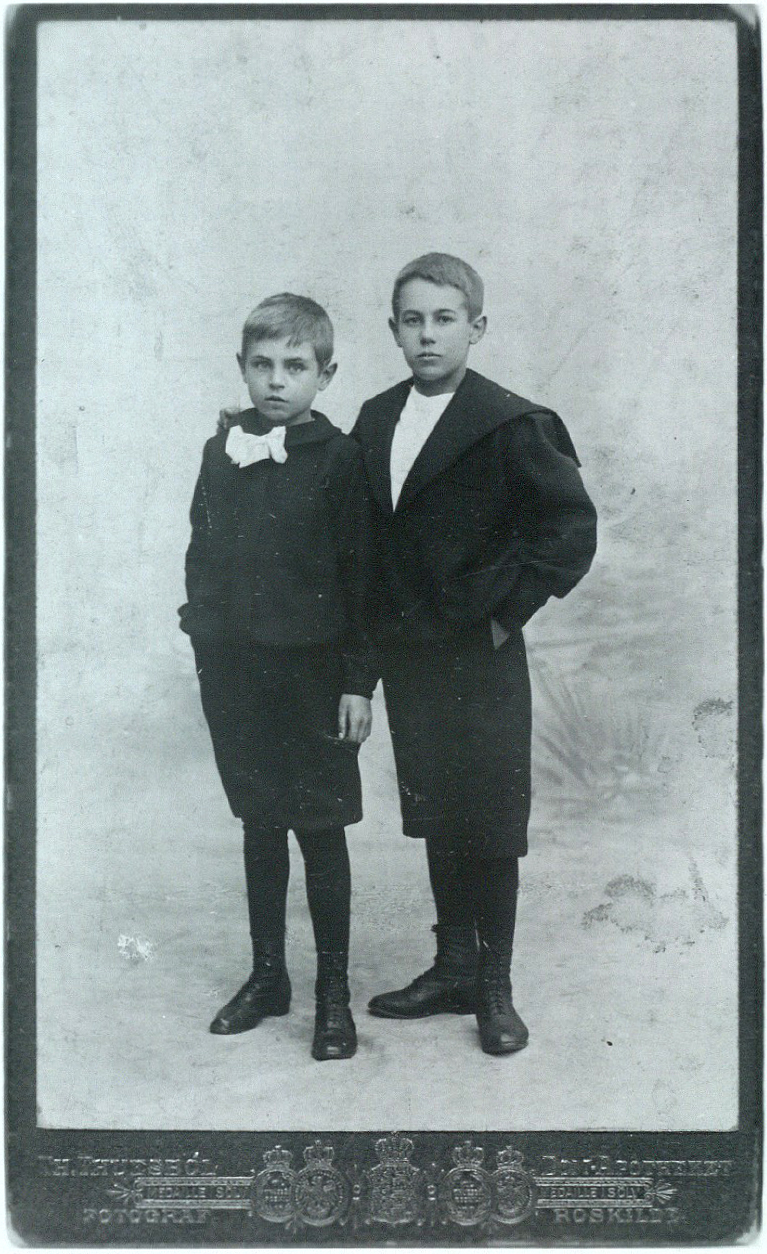
Poul Henningsen (left) with his brother Tage

Poul Henningsen was the fourth child of noted author Agnes Henningsen (1868–1962) through an extramarital relationship she had with satirist Carl Ewald (1856–1908) following her first marriage, that had ended in divorce. He and his three half-siblings spent a happy childhood in their mother's tolerant and modern home in Ordrup, that often was visited by the leading literates.

At the age of 16, he invented a self-pumping bicycle that earned him a scholarship from the Hielmstierne-Rosencroneske Foundation.

Between 1911 and 1917, he was trained at Copenhagen Technical College and the Technical University of Denmark, where he studied to be an architect, but never graduated, choosing instead to follow a career as an inventor and painter.

On 10 June 1919, he married his first wife Else Henningsen (née Strøyberg) in Copenhagen.

=== Early career ===
He entered into collaboration with the architect Kay Fisker in 1919. From 1920, Henningsen freelanced as an architect and designer.

Sketch of the Slotsholm Lamp

In 1920, Henningsen created the Slotsholm Lamp (Danish: Slotsholmslygte) which was installed between the Højbro and Holmens bridges along the Christiansborg Slotsplads canal in central Copenhagen. The prototype lamp consisted a lantern with a large top plate shade on a thin post. Henningsen designed the lamp to differ from the traditional design of gas light fixtures. In a column of Politiken in October 1921 where he wrote about the lamp, he criticized the habitual thinking and conservatism that he witnessed in the field of street lighting and emphasized that electric lights, like his Slotsholm Lamp, must have completely different and unfamiliar appearance than gas lighting. Only seven Slotsholm Lamps were ever created. The failure of the lamps to gain popularity may be due to the manufacturer, Copenhagen Lighting Service, removing some components of the lamp because they caused the light to glare. This was an issue that Poul Henningsen would later solve and the glare-free design feature would become a signature characteristic of his work.

The Paris Lamp

in 1921, he began his journalistic career when hired by Politiken to cover architecture. His writing emphasized the relationship between societal problems and architecture and the effects of Copenhagen's transformation into an urban metropolis. His journalism often focused on what he perceived to be the short-term thinking of municipal authorities' urban planning.

In 1925, Henningsen presented the Paris Lamp (Danish: Pariserlampen) at the International Exhibition of Modern Decorative and Industrial Arts at Paris. Henningsen won the gold medal for this creation. Lamp consisted of 6 shades and was made of silver. An early model of this lamp sold for £87,500 at auction in 2016.

=== Creating the three-shade lamp system ===
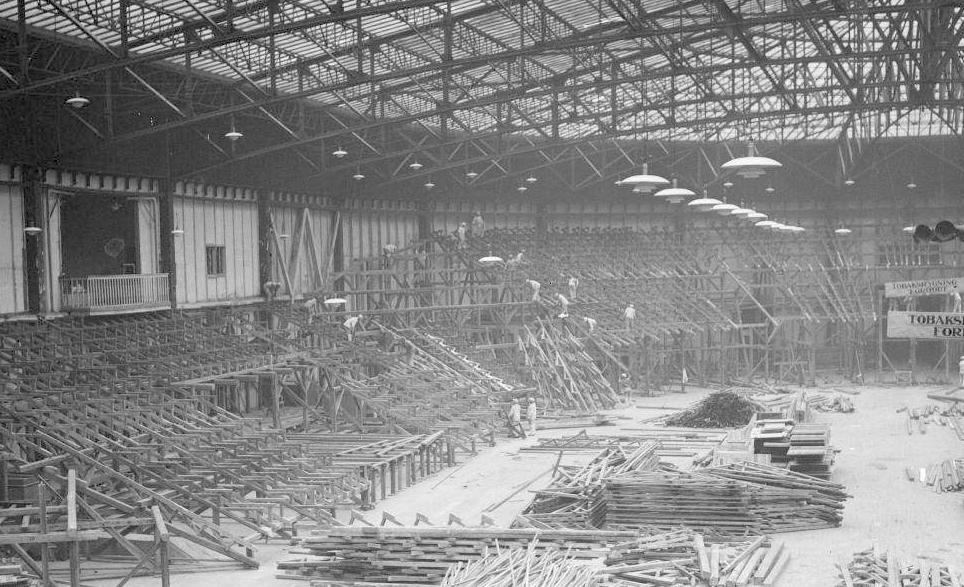
The lamps at Forum

After the Paris exhibit, Louis Poulsen and Henningsen were awarded a contract to provide lighting for the newly constructed Forum building in Copenhagen. The building was planned to house an international car exhibition. Rather than using beam lighting, which would illuminate the cars' roofs and hoods but leave the sides of the vehicles dark, Henningsen iterated on the Paris Lamp design to create a lamp that would channel the light in oblique paths. The Forum lamp had three shades, with diameter proportions of the shades following a 4:2:1 ratio. This ratio allowed the upper shade to reflect 50% of the light and the middle shade and bottom shade to reflect 25% each. The lamp Henningsen created for Forum would be the basis for the three-shade system. The design was subsequently developed into a comprehensive system of lamps of different sizes, colors, materials, types (floor lamps, table lamps and chandeliers).

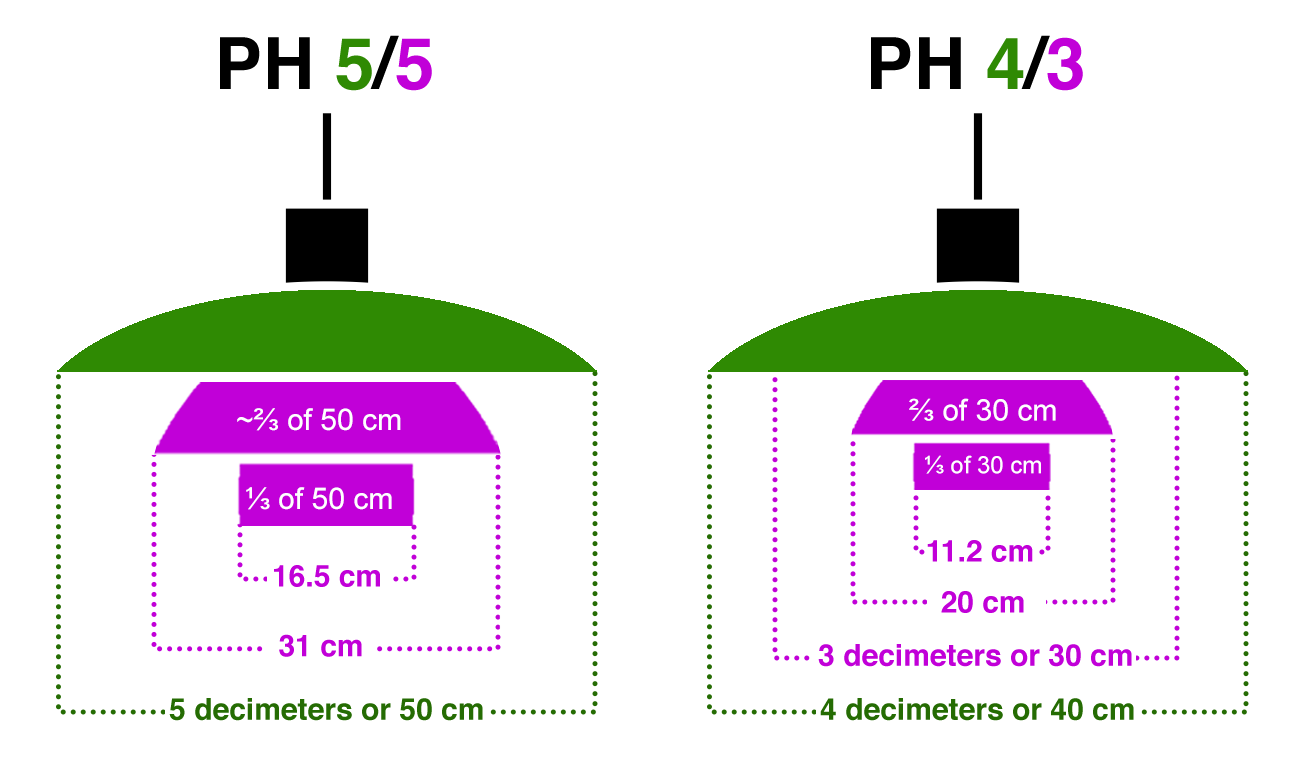
Illustration of three-shade lamp system's naming and sizing schema

During 1926–27, the Forum lamp design was converted into the rational three-shade system (Danish: 3-skærmssystemet) that could accommodate many different needs. The top, middle, and bottom shades corresponded to the proportions of an approximately 3:2:1 ratio (where the top shade was three-times larger than the bottom shade). (The exception was the largest lamp with 85 cm top shade, which used the 4:2:1 proportions). The first line of lamps were made available in five sizes. The lamps sizes in the system were given rational name scheme: 8/8, 6/6, 5/5, 4/4, and 3/3. The first number in the fraction represents the approximate diameter of the top shade in decimeters. The second number indicates the decimeter used to create the middle and bottom shades using the 3:2:1 ratio. For example: A PH 5/5 lamp has a 50 cm top shade, a 31 cm middle shade (around 2/3 of 50), and a 16.5 cm bottom shade (around 1/3 of 50).

The original models (with matching top and bottom fractions) worked well as ceiling lamps but they weren't suited for low-hanging use, like over a table, where the illumination area was too narrow and intense. To address this, Louis Poulsen released lamps in 1927 with larger top shade proportions. These wider lamps, like the PH 4/3 and PH 6/3, had a top shade from a larger model and a middle and bottom shade set from a smaller model. For example, a PH 4/3 lamp has a 40 cm top shade but a middle shade (20 cm) and a bottom shade (11.2 cm) created using the 3:2:1 proportions of a 30 cm top shade.

The lamps were commercially successful and the royalties created the financial safety net for Henningsen to focus on his literary work.

Three-shade Lamp System
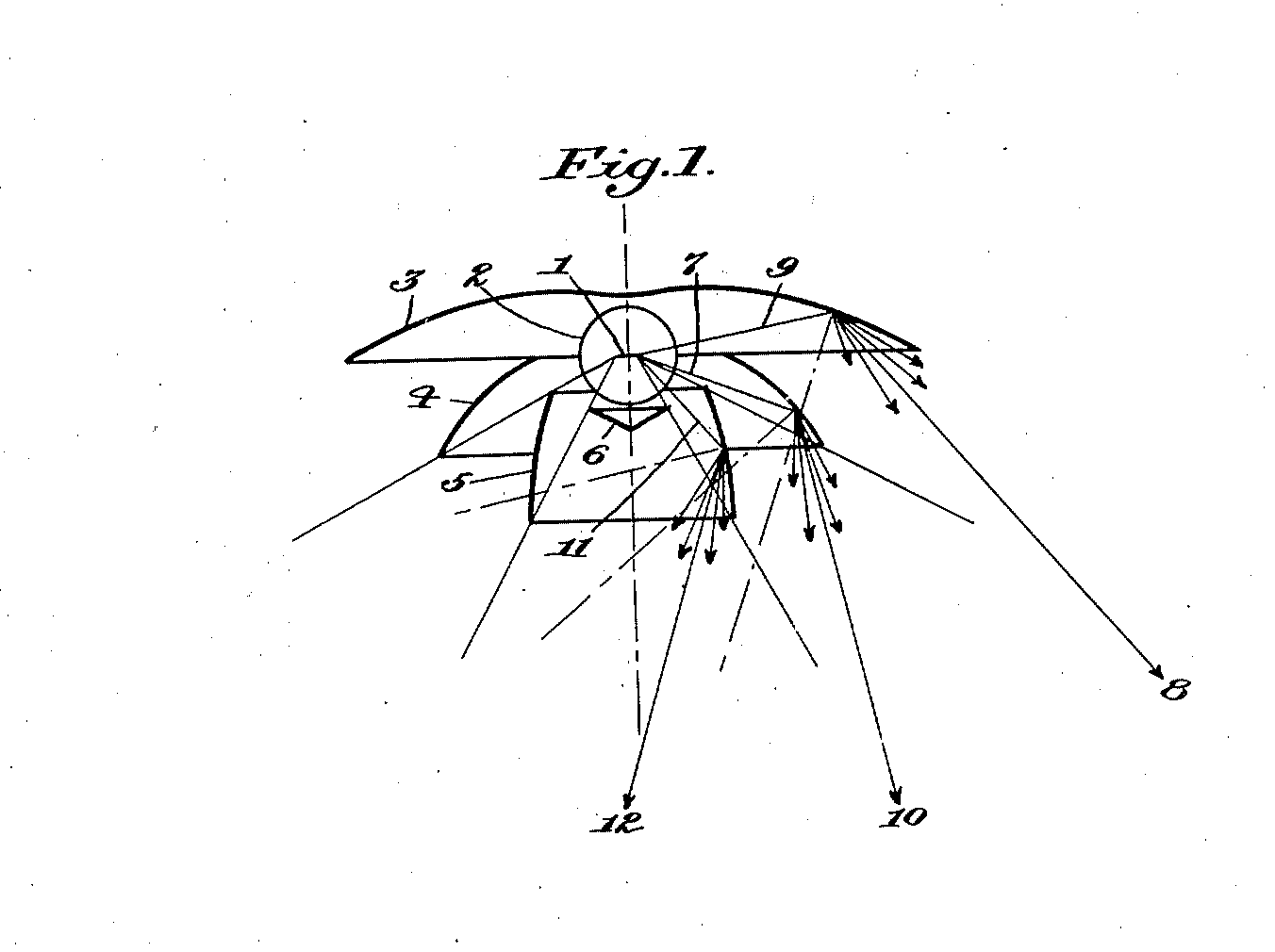
Image from the patent filing for PH's three-shade system

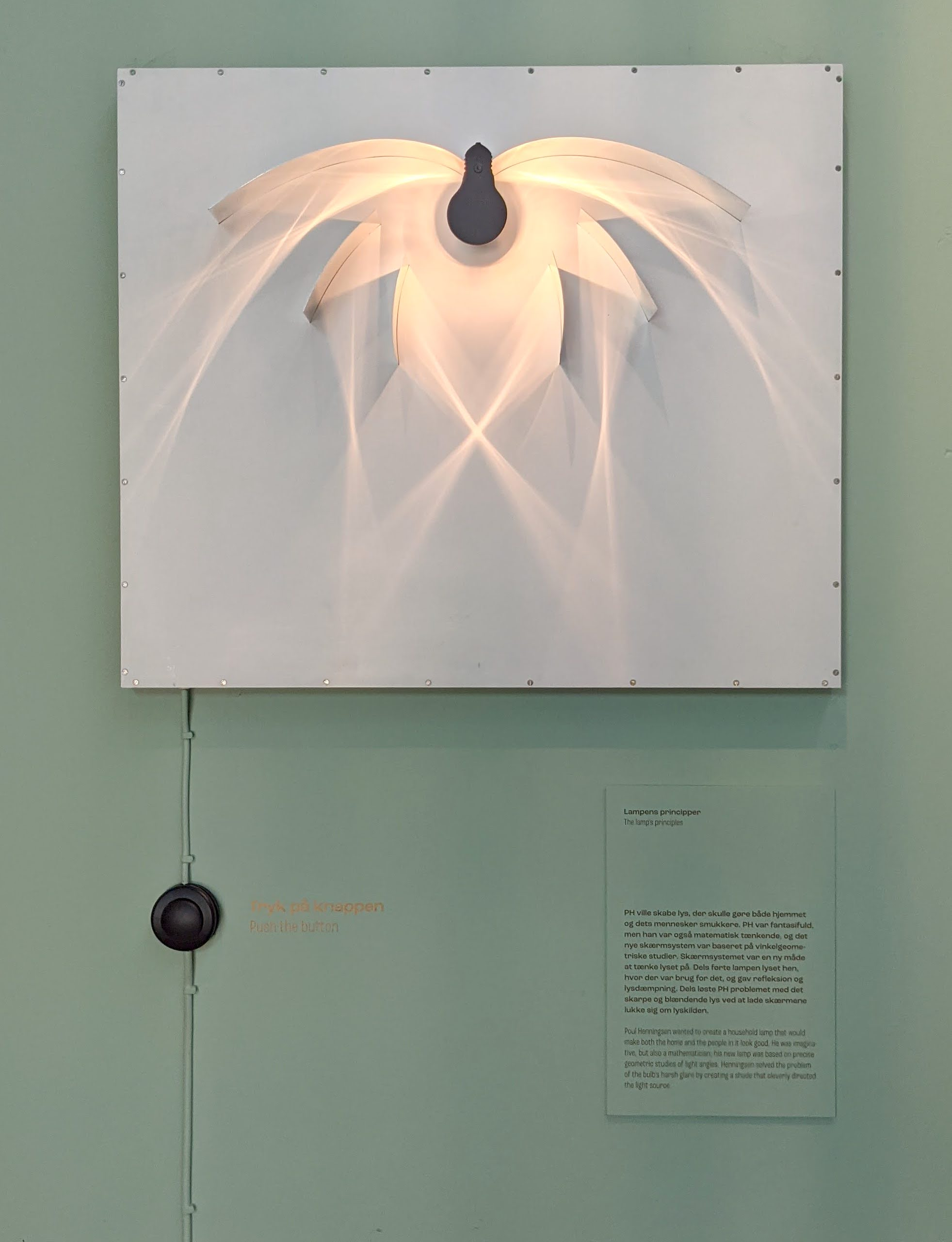
Display at the Danish Architecture Centre demonstrating how the lamp reflects light

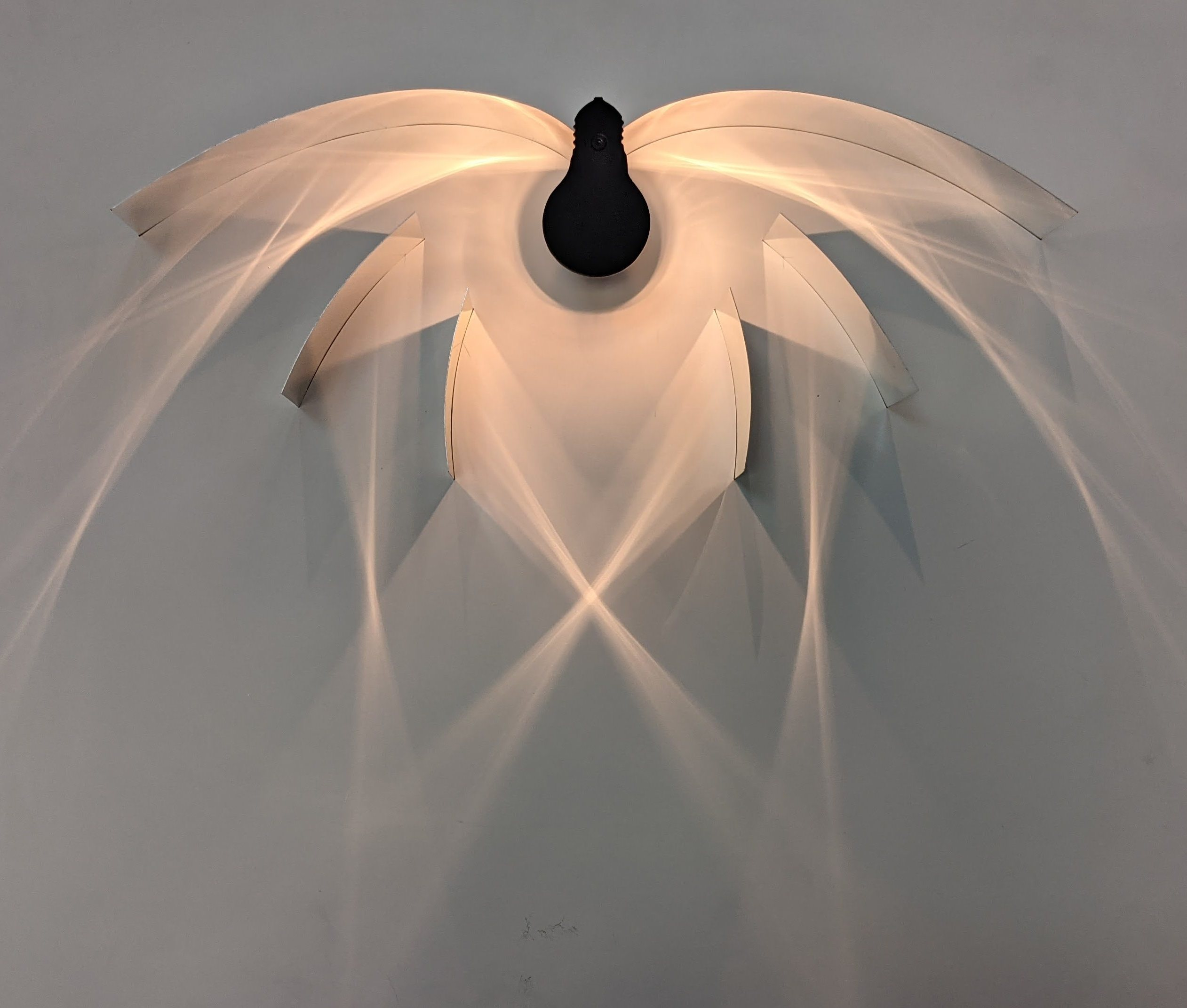
Close up on the display

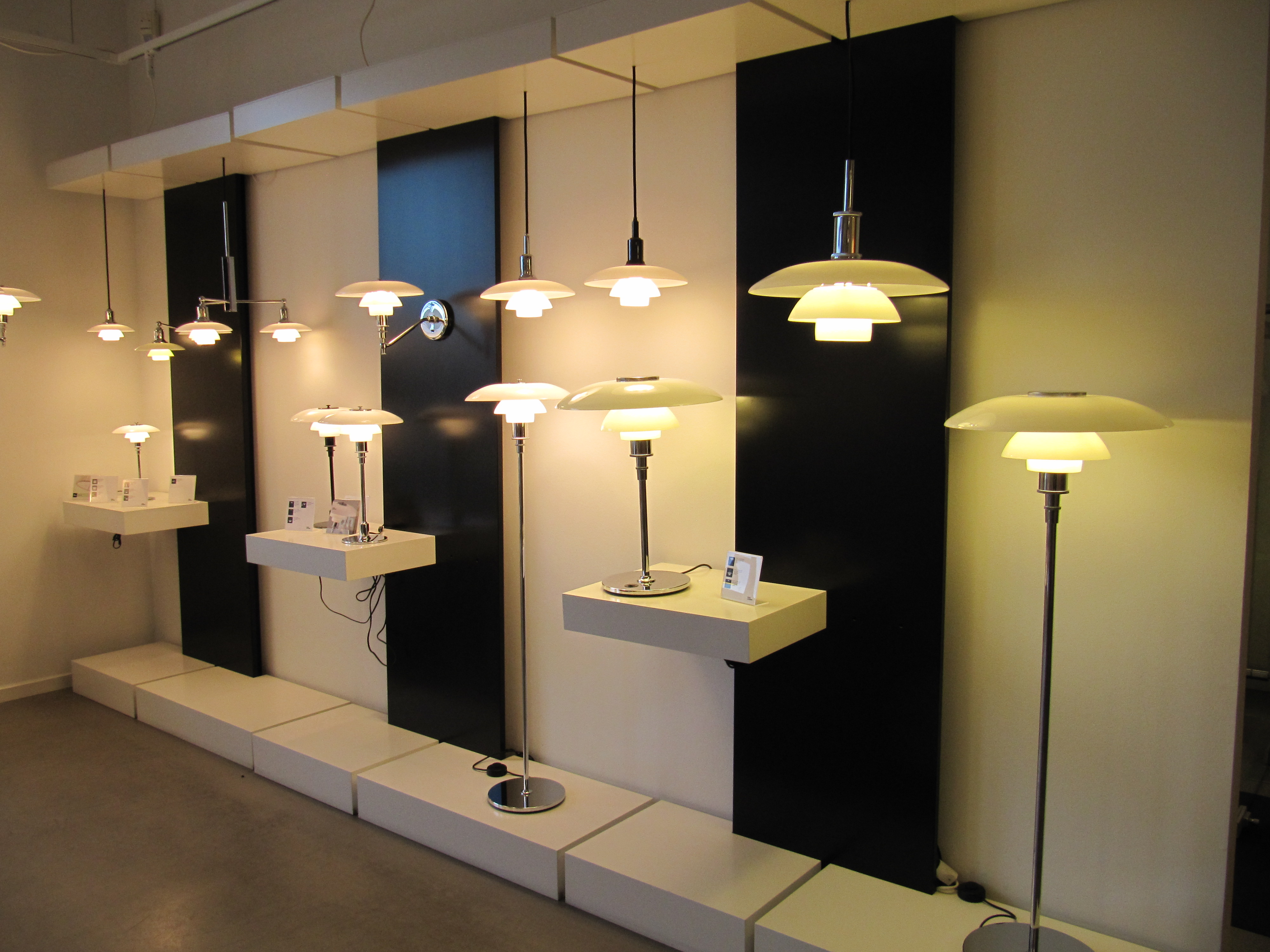
Three-shade system lamps in different forms at Louis Poulsen's Showroom in Copenhagen

=== Literary career ===
During the 1920s Poul Henningsen had his literary breakthrough. He edited the polemic left-wing periodical, Kritisk Revy (1926–1928, "Critical Review"), in which he and his colleagues scorned old-fashioned style and cultural conservatism, linking these themes to politics. At the same time he began as a revue writer praising natural behaviour, sexual broad-mindedness, and simple living. He made the Danish revues a political weapon of the left-wing without giving up its character of entertainment (the so-called PH-revues 1929–32).

PH Grand Piano
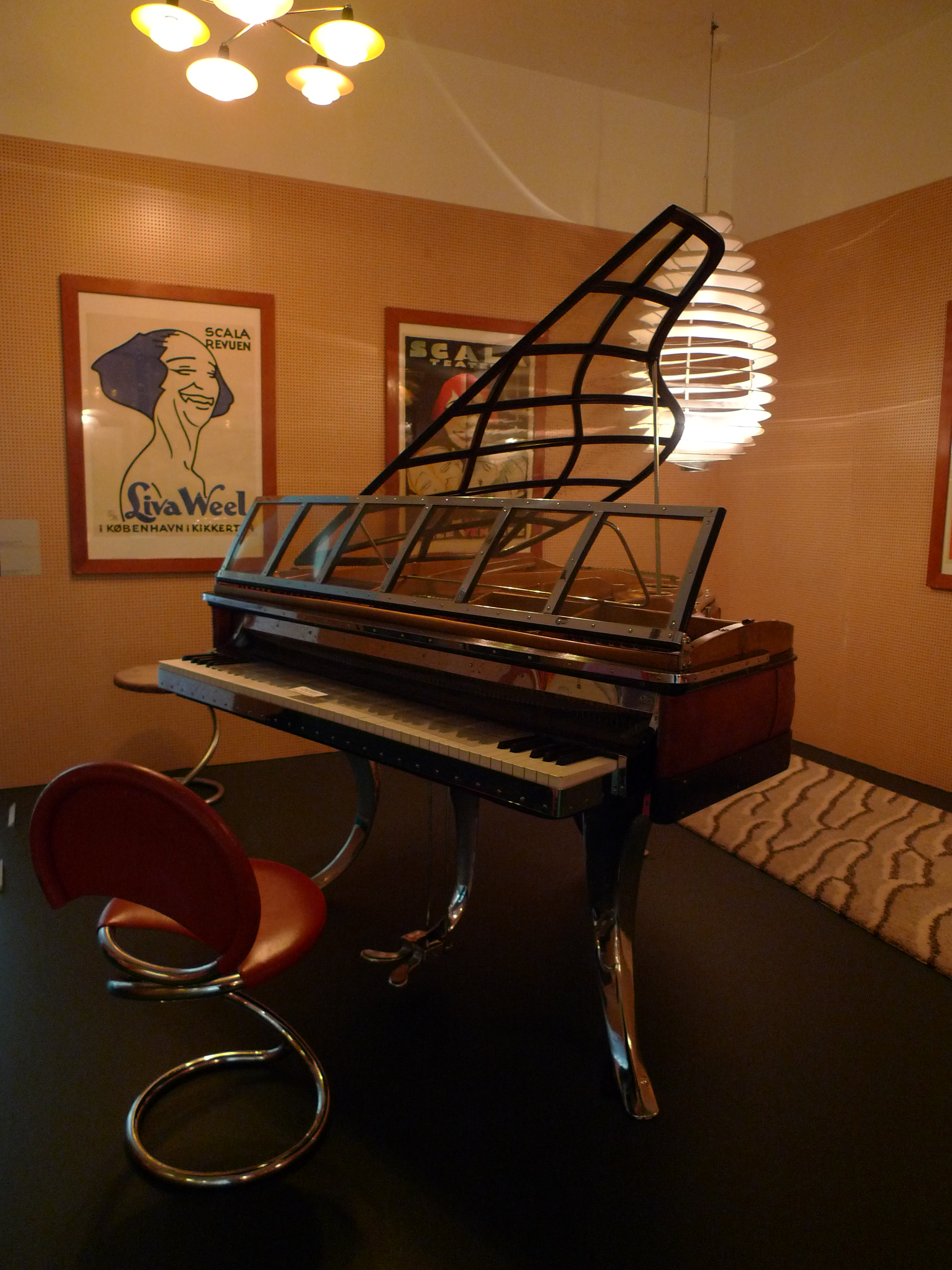
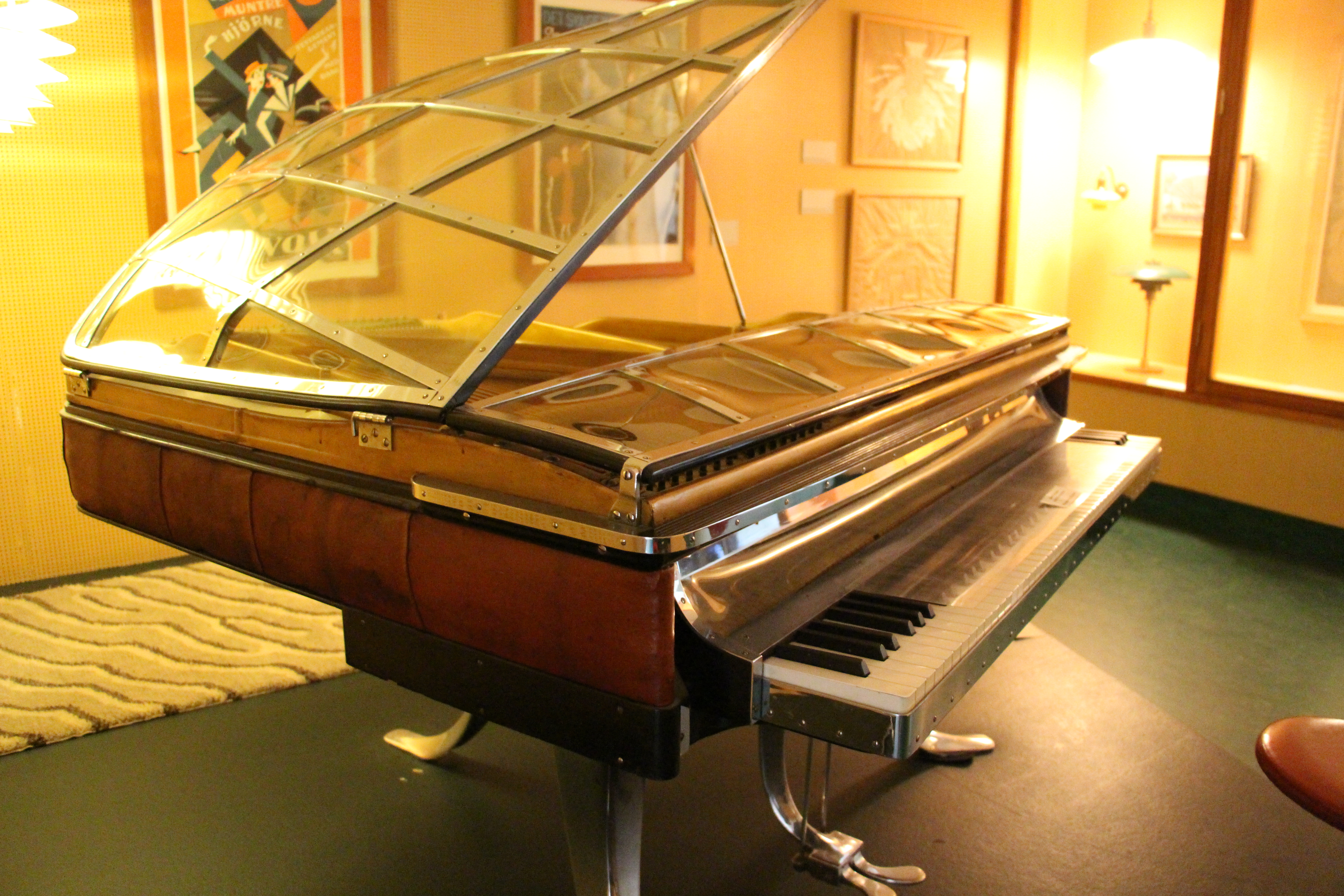
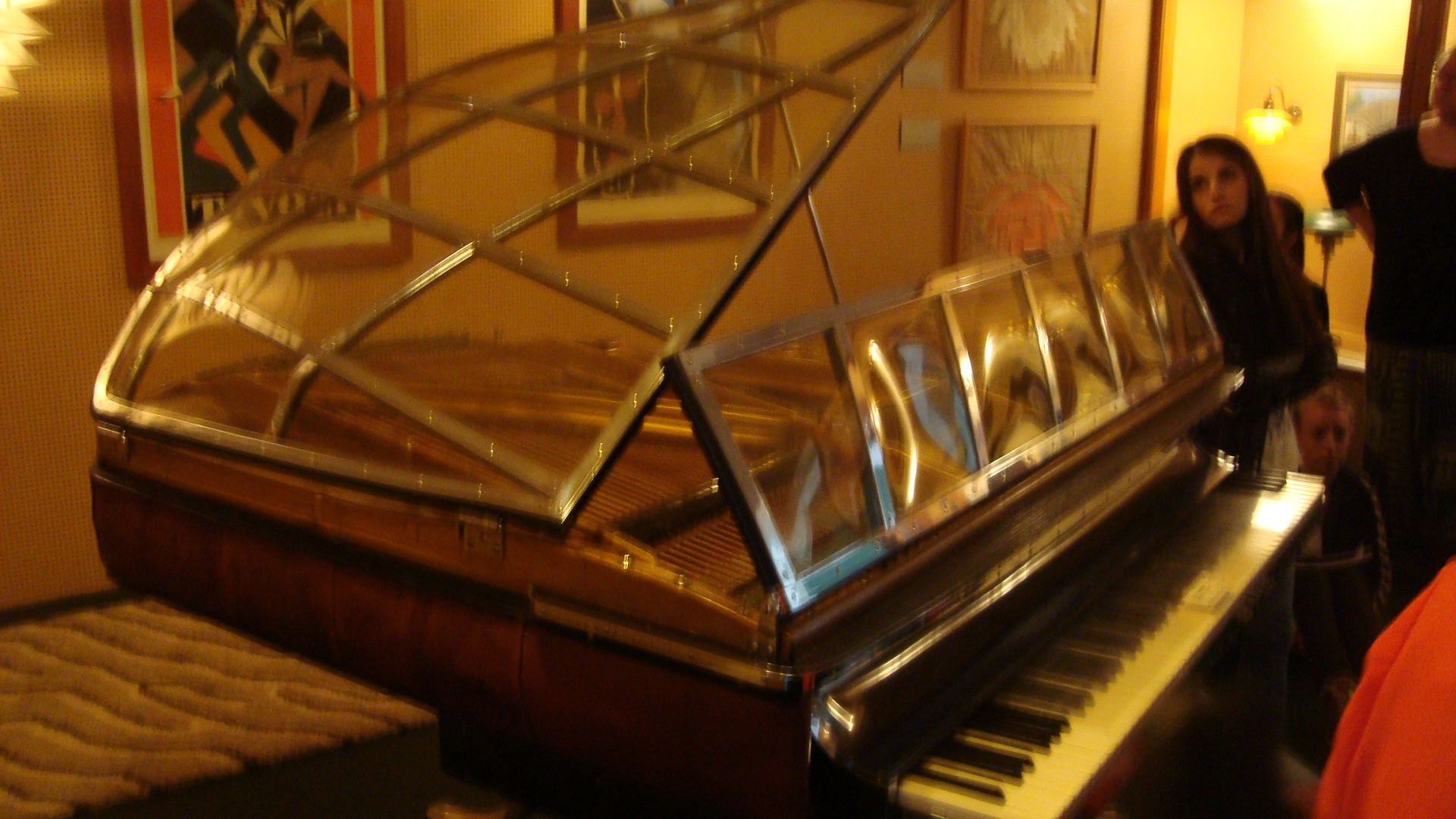

Henningsen created the PH Grand Piano (Danish: PH Flyglet) in 1930. Poul Henningsen did a groundbreaking design with the PH Grand Piano that is characterised by the transparent glass-lid, the leather rim and the steel legs. The PH Grand Piano departures significantly from the traditional grand piano or the "black box". Poul Henningsen wanted to open up the piano and bring out the beauty of the musical parts. It has become a Danish design icon and reflects an important contribution to the Bauhaus design tradition.

In 1933, he edited his most famous work What About Culture? (Danish: Hvad med Kulturen? ), a polemic, audacious, and urgent criticism of Danish cultural life and its snobism and passion of the past in spite of all the efforts of the Modern Break-Through. He tried to make parallels between prudery, moralizing, and fascist leanings. He also accused the Social Democrats of lacking a firm and consequent cultural line. Together with this book, his activities as a whole brought him a reputation as a semi-communist "fellow traveller". During this period, in fact, he stood near the communists without joining them. He took part in the anti-fascist propaganda, always trying to connect culture and politics.

Among his other initiatives of this period was Danmarksfilmen (1935), (English: The Film of Denmark), also known as PH's Danmarksfilm. It is an unpretentious and untraditional film portraying life in contemporary Denmark in a lively and slightly disrespectful way in which the visuals are supported by jazz rhythms. Initially, it was condemned and decried by most critics, but later on it became rehabilitated as one of the classic Danish documentary films. He also wrote some movie manuscripts.

=== Creating PH's House ===
PH's House
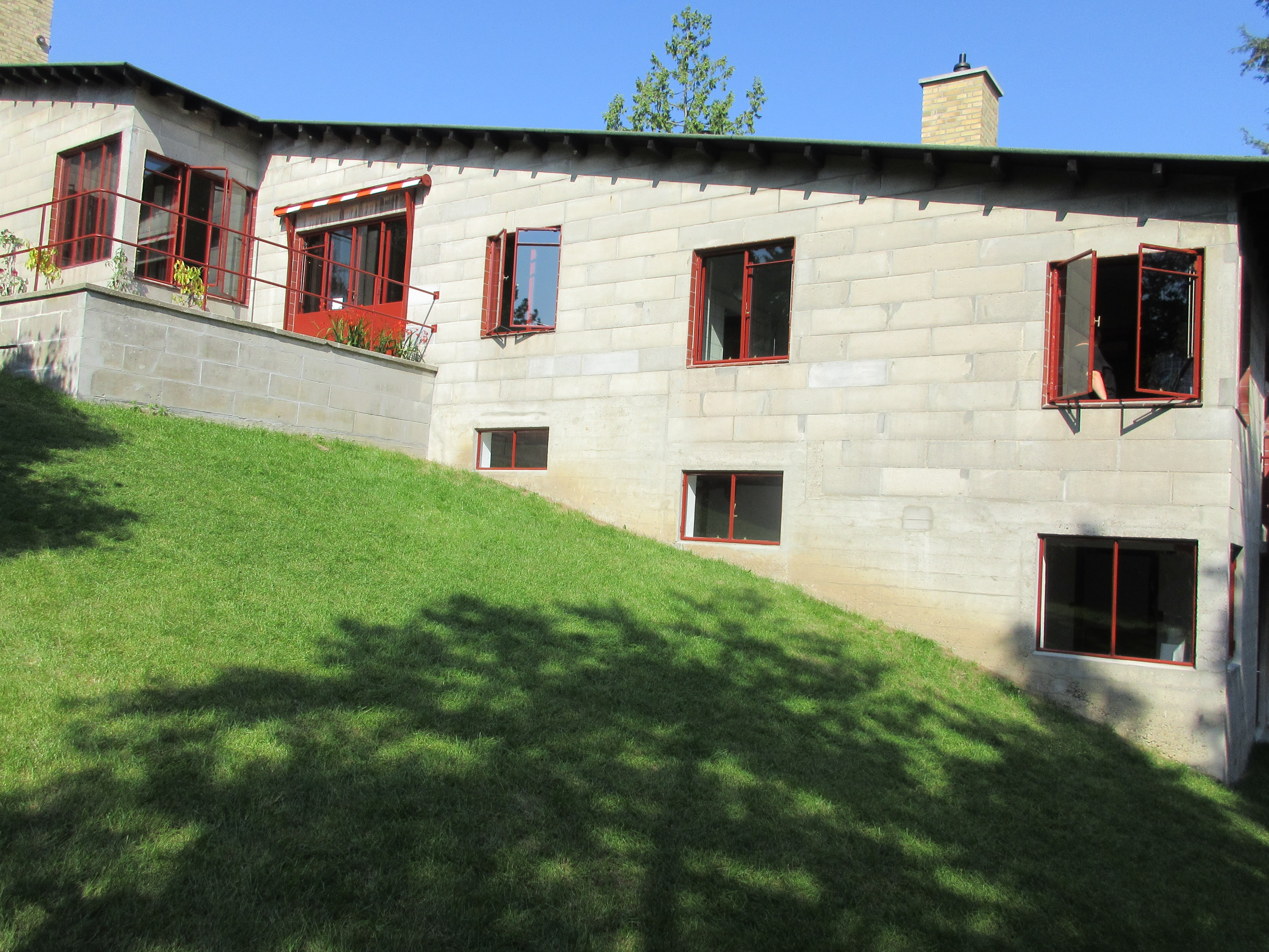
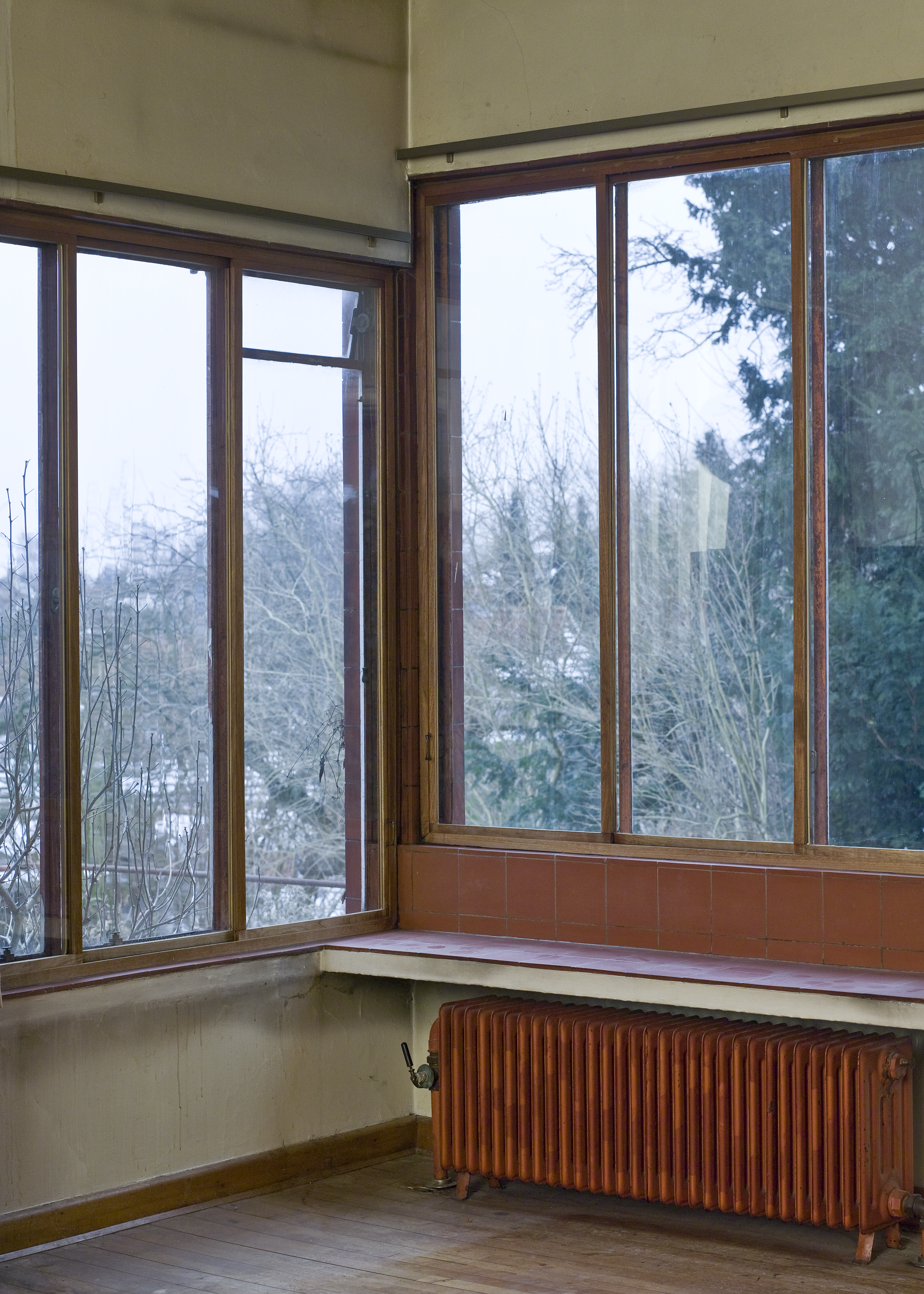
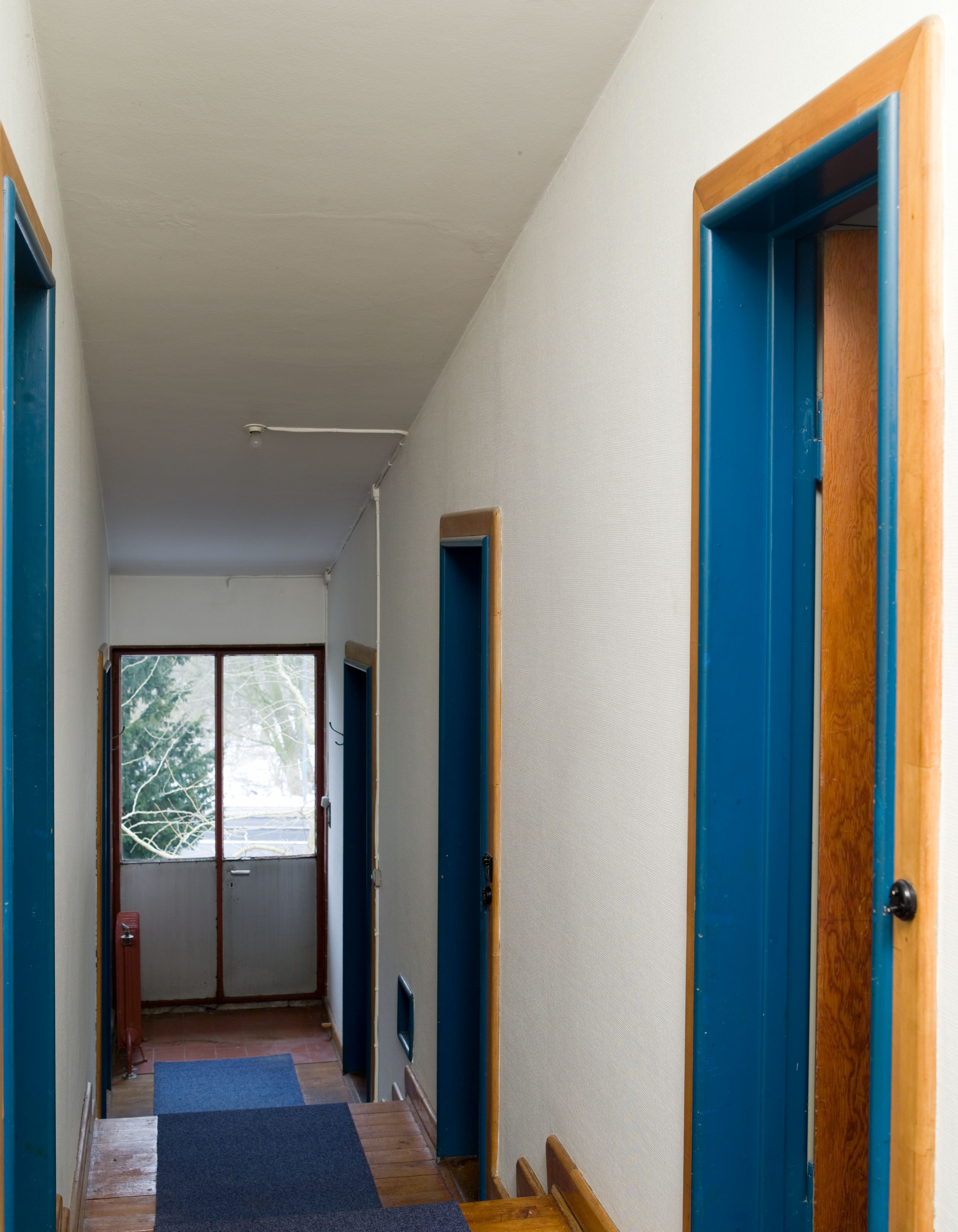
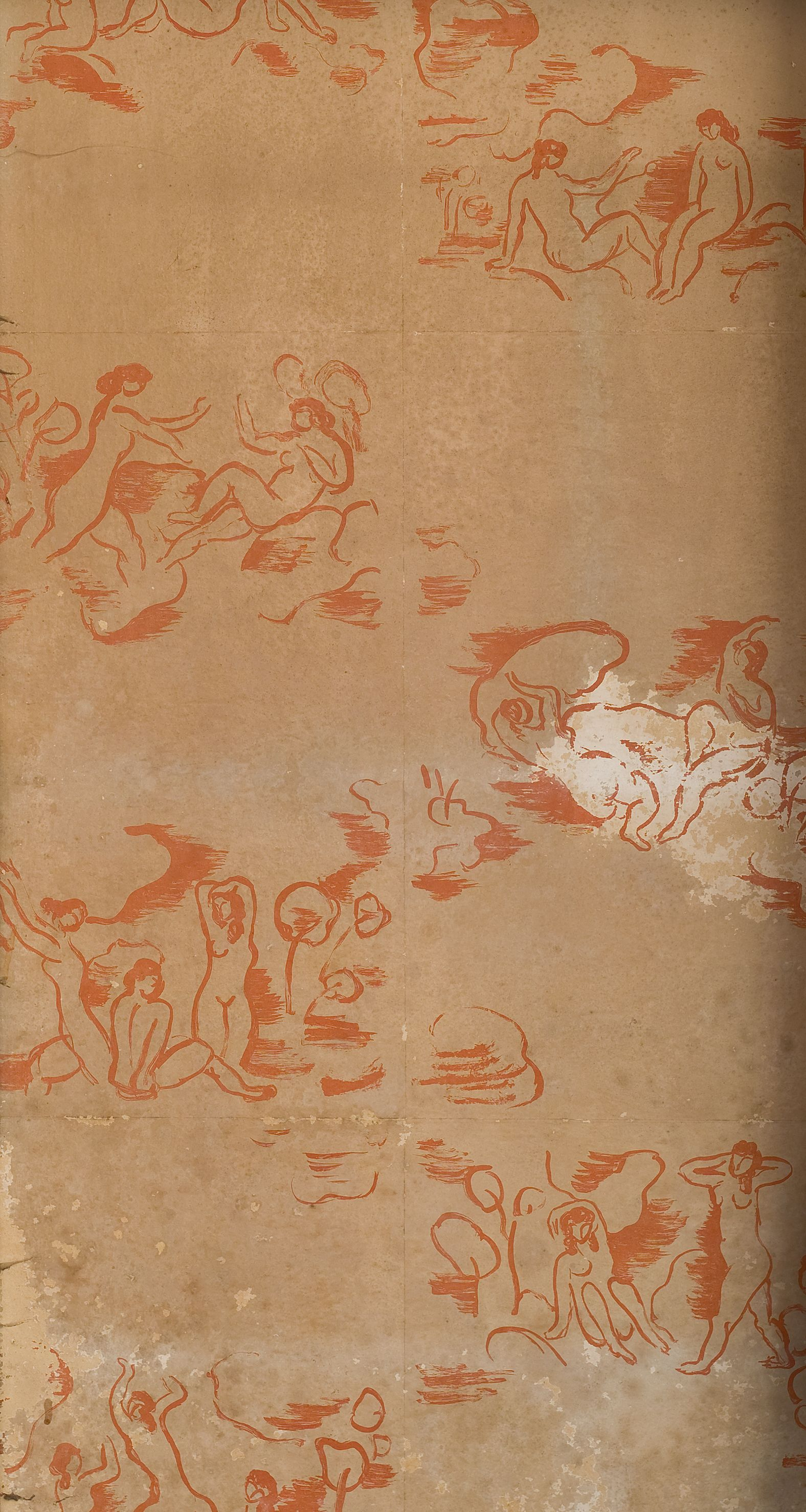

In 1937, Henningsen designed his family house (referred to as PH's Eget Hus in Danish) on Brogårdsvej 72 in the Gentofte suburb of Copenhagen for his family – consisting of first wife Else Henningsen and their two teenage children Berta and Simon. The house, which Henningsen jokingly described as the ugliest house in Gentofte, is features exposed concrete blocks construction that may have been a gesture to distance himself from the wealth of his neighbors.

The plot was purchased from Jens Møller-Jensen larger plot on the condition that they did not obstruct Møller-Jensen's view of Gentofte Lake. To accommodate this request, the entire house was built on a slope and features stairs between nearly every room in the house. Henningsen joked that the house combines the disadvantages of a two-story house with the disadvantages of a one-story house.

Henningsen only lived in the house for four years. He moved out of the home after he divorced from his first wife Else Henningsen in 1942. After the divorce, he married physiotherapist Inger Andersen on 31 March 1943.

The building was listed for conservation protection in 1995. In 2014, Realdania By & Byg purchased the house and finished restoring it in 2016.

=== Fleeing Nazism ===
Poul Henningsen was a sharp critic of Nazism. In 1938, he was fired from Politiken for his outspoken views while the newspaper chose to take a neutral position on the impending world war.

On 9 April 1940, German troops invaded and occupied Denmark. During the German Occupation, he kept a low profile but he tried to keep the spirit going by camouflaged resistance poetry. In 1940, Henningsen contributed the song They tie us down mouth and hand to Kjeld Abell's revue Dyveke, in which the subtext called for resistance to the Nazis, while the German censors missed the double meaning and understood the song only at a surface level, as being about the restrictive bonds of marriage.

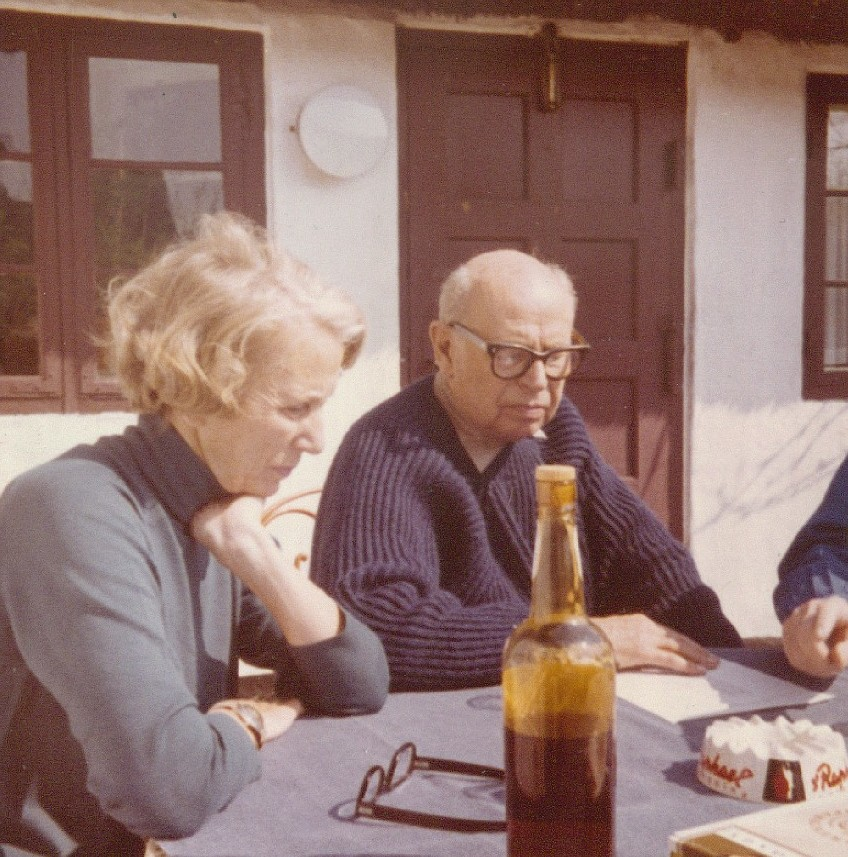
Poul Henningsen and Inger F. Andersen in 1965

Before the Nazis could deport him to the concentration camps or otherwise endanger him, he secretly left Denmark along with most Jewish Danes in 1943. He fled to neutral Sweden with the Jewish architect Arne Jacobsen and their wives in a rowboat led by a Jewish civil engineer and student rower named Herbert Marcus. The drastic move to flee from Denmark likely saved Henningsen's life. The Danish Nazi leader Wilfred Petersen had planned an assassination plot to kill Henningsen and his family by setting their home on fire. Petersen may have been motivated to murder by PH's Dagmar-revyen (1942), where Henningsen mockingly referred to Petersen as "Vilfred Pedrsen" and comparing him to his rival Frits Clausen in the song And two hearts beat sweetly at the same time (Danish: Så slår to hjerter sødt i samme takt).

=== Post-war activities ===
Henningsen returned to Denmark in 1945. After the war, he dissociated himself from the communists, who were criticizing him for humanitarianism in his attitude toward the settlement with the Nazis and for his growing skepticism about the Soviet Union, and in many ways, he was isolated. He kept writing and debating, however, and during the 1960s in many ways, the new generation made him something of a guru.

In 1946, he re-designed the Glass Hall (Danish: Glassalen) for Tivoli in Copenhagen. In 1948, Henningsen jointly published a collection of children's songs with Bernhard Christensen. One of these songs was Oh! Monkey or There was once a monkey (Danish: Oh! Abe or Der var engang en abe) which became extremely popular and is one of the most well-known children's songs in Denmark today.

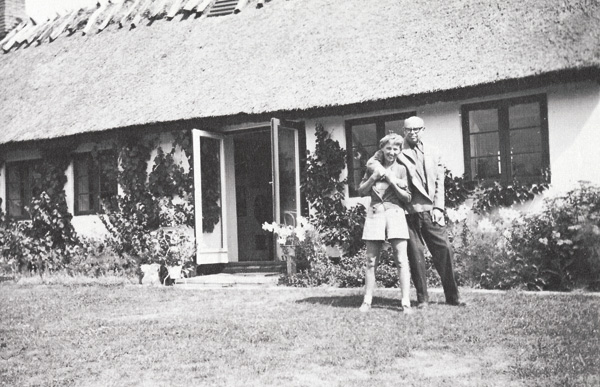
Poul and Inger Henningsen in front of their house in 1958

In many ways Poul Henningsen is the one who completed the work of Danish critic and scholar Georg Brandes (1842–1927). He was somewhat superficial and light, but more modern and less elitist in his views. Being a tease and a provoker who often tried turning concepts upside down (as George Bernard Shaw also did) and whose conclusions might be both somewhat unjust and exaggerated, he was however, a man of firm principles and ideals of a democratic, natural, and tolerant society.

Poul Henningsen also had a large influence on the Danish company Bang & Olufsen (B&O). In 1954, he wrote a critical review calling a B&O radio "a monster with a bloated belly, an insult to people who like modern furniture." This review was the beginning of a change in product development at B&O where designers would be included in product design.

Select works of 1958

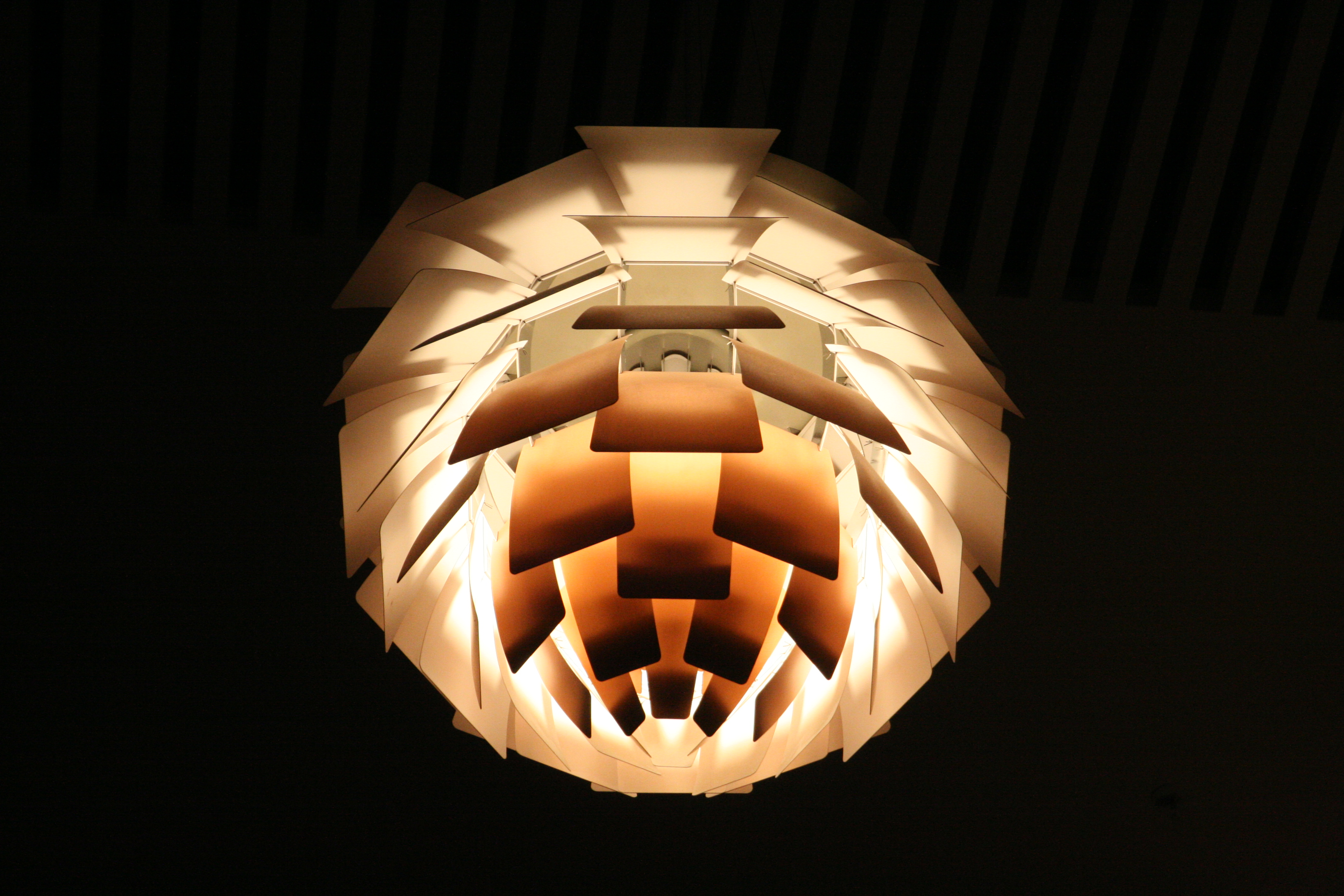
PH Artichoke lamp

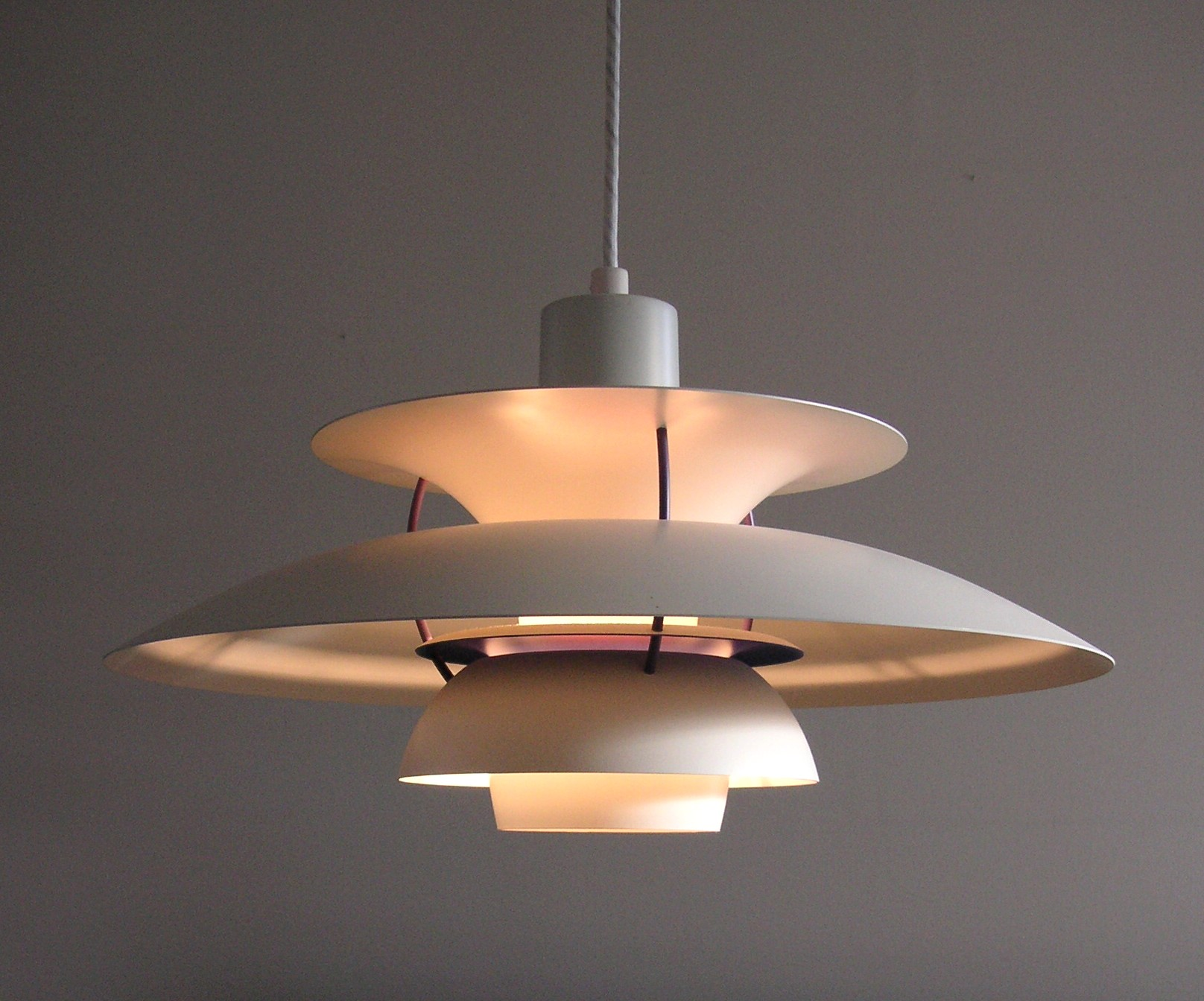
PH-5 lamp

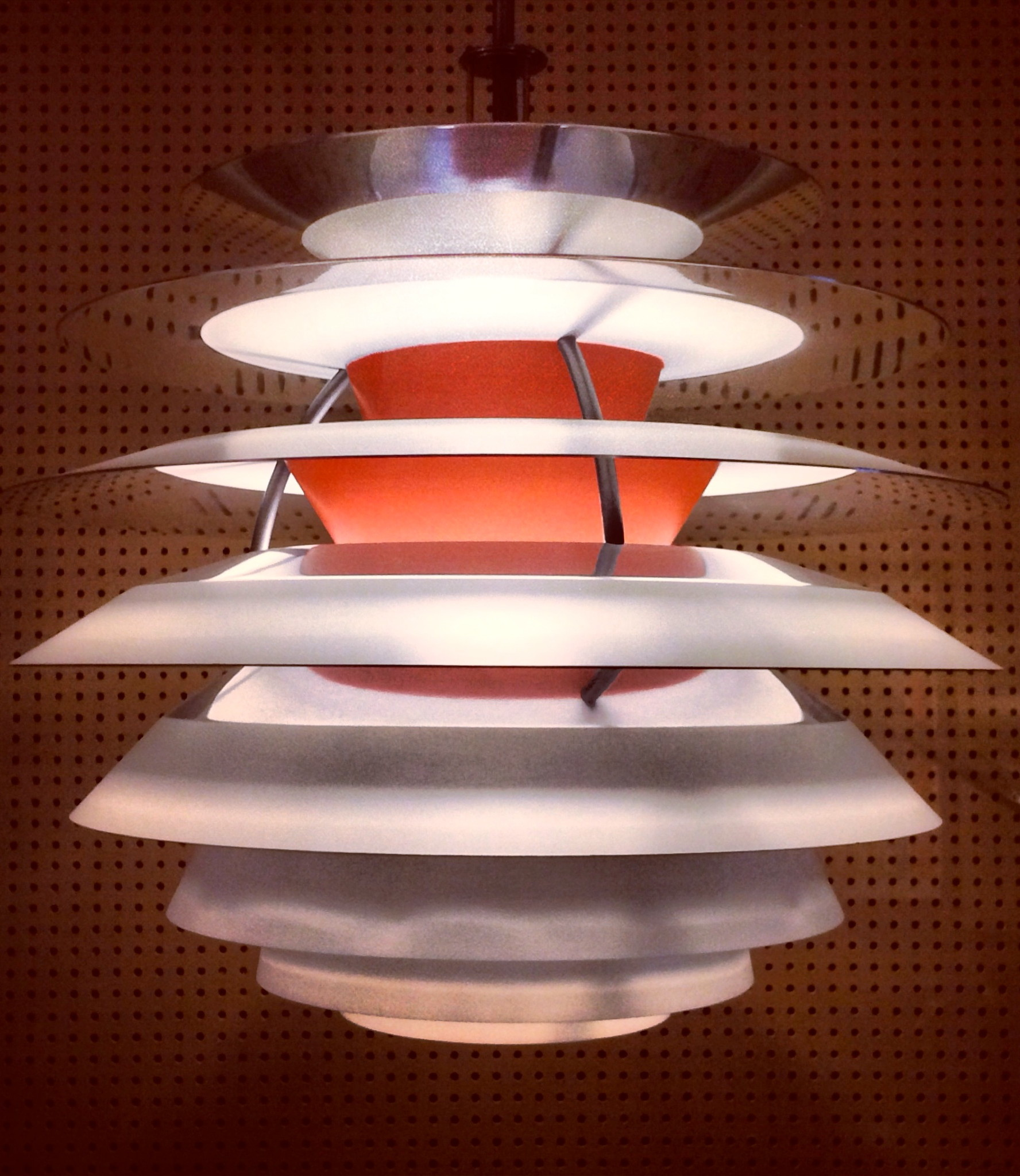
PH Contrast

In 1958, he created his best-known models: PH Artichoke and PH5. In 1960, Henningsen was again employed by Politiken and the international art industry magazine Mobilia. He became a member of the Danish Academy in 1963.

== Death and legacy ==
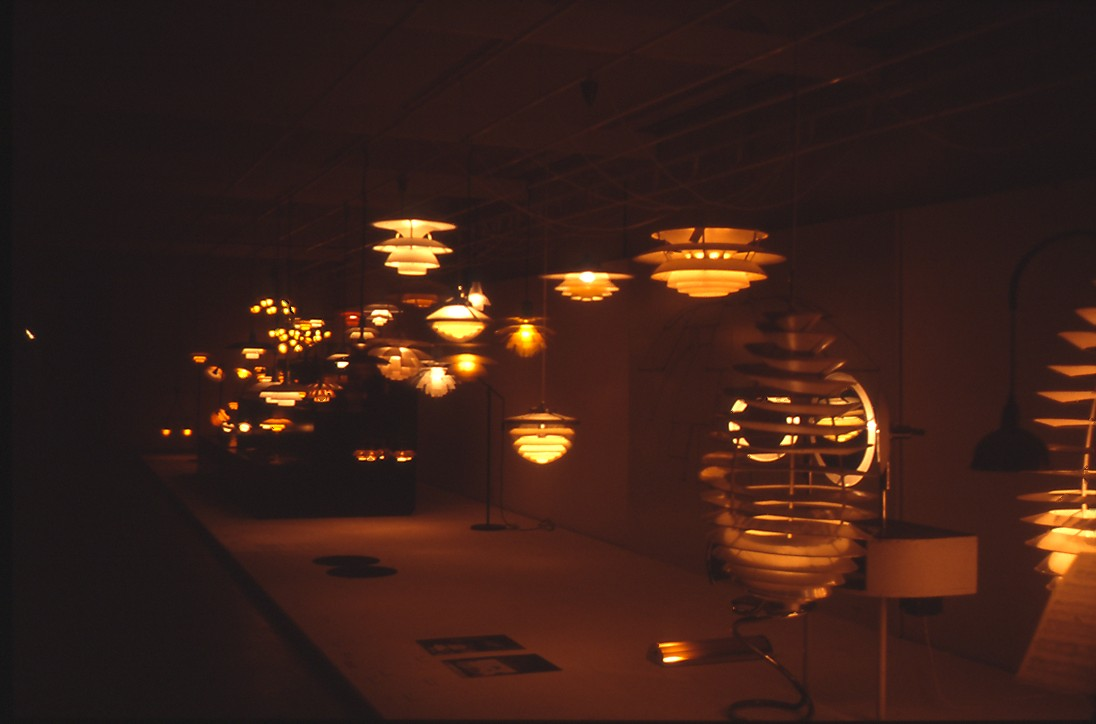
A collection of PH's lamps on display

In 1963, Henningsen was diagnosed with Parkinson's disease and struggled with difficulty speaking, tremors, and depression. He began to be viewed as a "Rasmus Modsat" (Danish equivalent to a Mary Quite Contrary) within Danish culture and struggled to get published in Danish newspapers in the last years of his life. Henningsen died on 31 January 1967. He was buried in Bispebjerg Cemetery in a common grave. In the time since his death, his contrarian cultural critiques began to have had their breakthrough and his views had become popular and met with acceptance and recognition in much larger circles. The PH Prize was established in memory of Poul Henningsen. The prize is awarded to people or institutions that have promoted ideas for which PH fought.

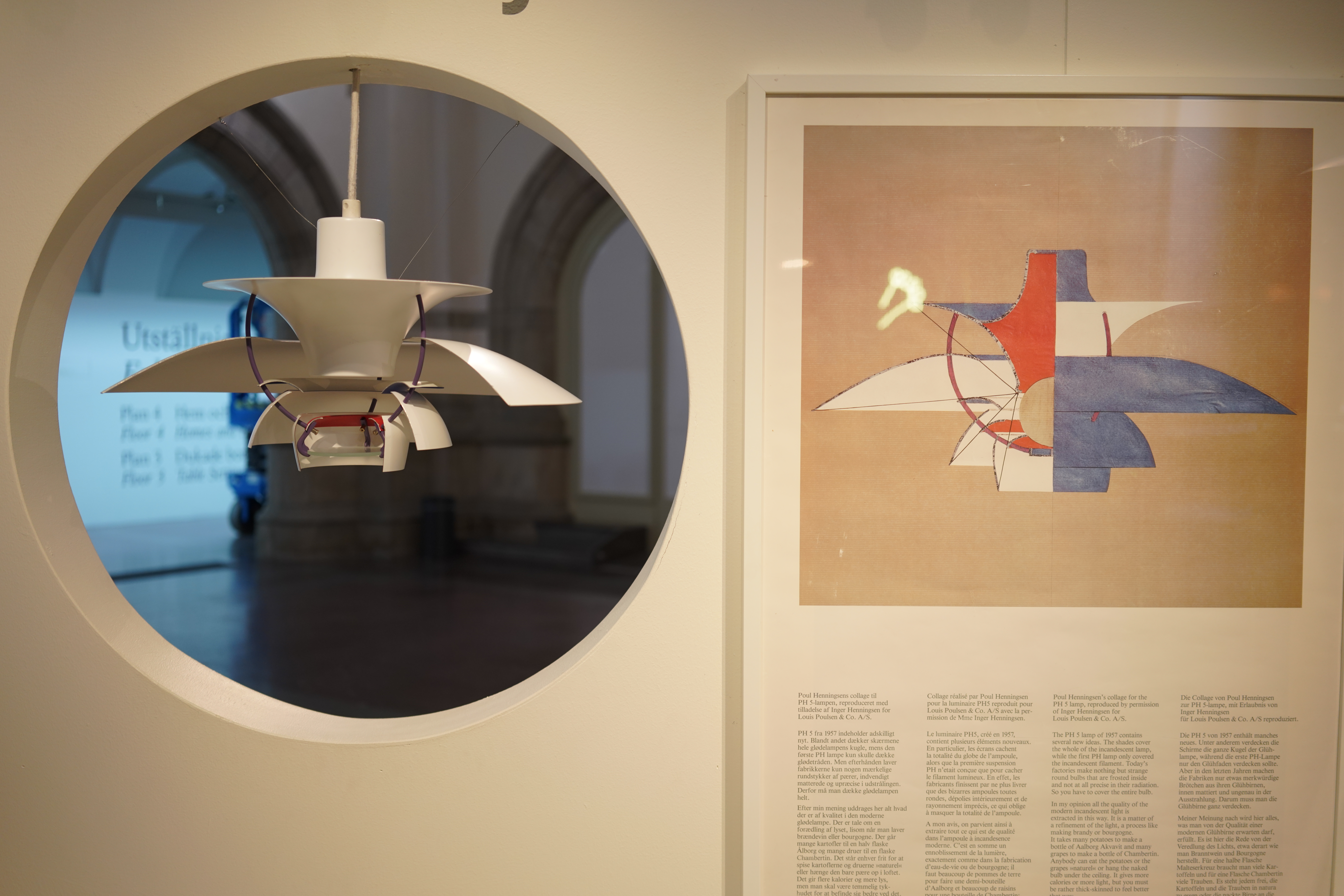
Cross-section cut PH5 lamp on display at the Nordic Museum in Sweden.

There have been efforts underway to create a permanent space to exhibit Henningsen's work. In 2000, a group started making plans to create a permanent exhibition space for 300 of Poul Henningsen's lamps and a cabaret theater in Kødbyen in Copenhagen. A scaled down cafe and music venue eventually open under the name PH Café (Danish: PH Caféen) but has since closed. In 2010, plans were drafted to create a museum in Vejen dedicated to Poul Henningsen work and to showcase the Louis Poulsen's archive of PH's lamps (valued at DKK 30 million) but the project has not materialized in the intervening time.

PH lamps continue to remain popular, especially in Denmark. The PH lamp shade system was selected into the Danish Culture Canon, where jury committee called it "the symbol of Danishness and good taste" and responsible for Denmark's position "at the forefront of lighting for many years."

Two songs that Henningsen wrote are also included Danish Culture Canon under the 12 Selected Songs by Kai Normann Andersen entry: They tie us down mouth and hand [Man binder os på mund og hånd] and In your short life [I dit korte liv] The songs were also added to the Højskolesangbogen. In 2004, the hip-hop group Outlandish covered Man binder os på mund og hånd. While Henningsen wrote the song to critique the Nazi oppression, the song takes on a contemporary relevance when interpreted with the band's outspoken activism against the Danish government restrictive immigration policies.

In 2018, Danish designers Joakim Zacho Weylandt and Søren Peter Kristensen recreated Henningsen's Slotsholm Lamp using modern means and are seeking support to have they installed along the Christiansborg Slotsplads canal, where the original street lamps once stood.

For the 125 year anniversary of PH's birth, Tivoli opened the "Poul Henningsen in Tivoli" exhibition in 2019 to showcase Henningsen's lamps and his creations in the role head architect at Tivoli.

Poul Henningsens Plads in Copenhagen is named in his honour.

== Notable works ==
=== Architecture ===
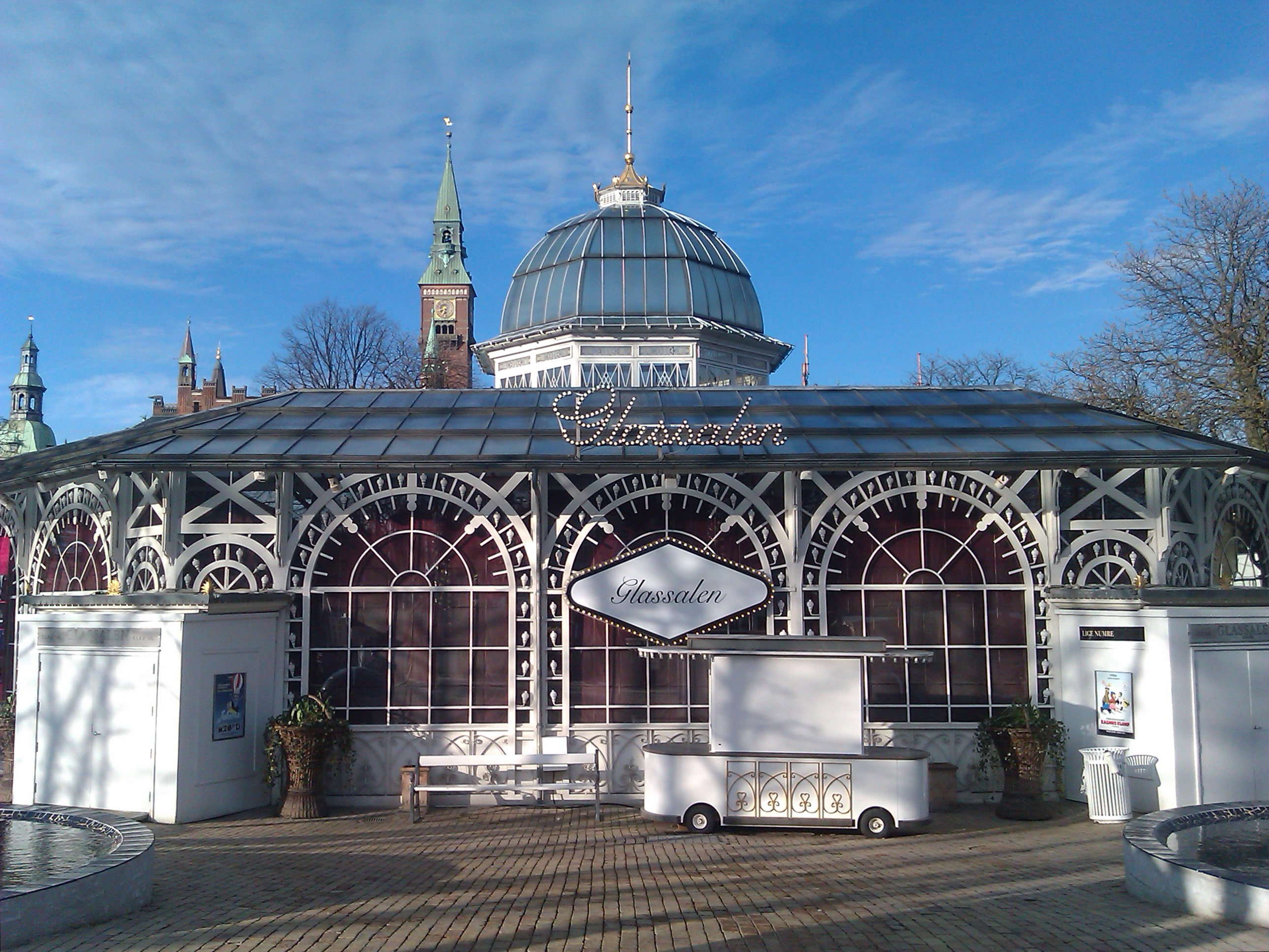
The Glass Hall in Tivoli in Copenhagen.

- Gyldenholm Allé 18, Gentofte, Copenhagen (1933–34)
- Henne Mølle Å Badehotel in Henne Strand, Varde Municipality, Denmark (1936)
- NL Dehn's Steam Laundry in Søborg, Denmark (1936)
- Brogårdsvej 72 "PH's House" in Gentofte, Denmark (1937)
- Glass Hall (Danish: Glassalen), Tivoli, Copenhagen, Denmark (1956)

=== Written and visual works ===
Songs

- Ølhunden (1929), lyricist, sung by Osvald Helmuth
- Man binder os på mund og hånd (1940), lyricist, sung by Liva Weel
- I dit korte liv (1941), lyricist, sung by Liva Weel
- For din skyld (1965), lyricist

Screenplays

- Danmarksfilmen (1935), director and writer
- Den opvakte jomfru (1950), writer

Other

- Hva 'mæ kulturen? [What About Culture?] (1933)
- A History of Eroticism (1938) with Ove Brusendorff*
- Love's picture book: The History of Pleasure and Moral Indignation (1958) with Ove Brusendorff*

*Translated to English

=== Furniture, lamps and product design ===
Image	Name and Description	Year
	Slotsholm Street Lamp (Danish: Slotsholmslygte) See description above	1920–21
	Paris Lamp (Danish: Pariserlampen) See description above	1925
	PH three-shade lamp system (Danish: 3-skærmssystemet) See description above	1926–27
	PH 4/3 Created in glass in 1928. A metal version was introduced in 1966.	1928
	PH Septima (Danish: Syvskærmskrone) A glass pendant lamp made of seven shades (hence the name Septima). The glass was partially sandblasted to reduce glare. It was manufactured until 1940 when it discontinued due to material shortages during WWII.	1927–31
	PH Academy Lamp (Danish: Akademikrone or Akademi) A chandelier version of the three-shade lamp, a single-center rod with arms bearing each lamp. Included at the Danish National Pavilion at the 1929 International Exposition in Barcelona alongside Kaare Klint's furniture The lamps were first created for the Royal Academy of Fine Arts (hence the name). Other chandelier versions include the Anchor Crown (Danish: Ankerkrone) with long curved arms, the Star Crown (Danish: Stjernekrone) with rods between the lamps to create a star polygon, and the Ring Crown (Danish: Ringkrone) with the lamps connected by one or more hoops.	1927
	PH Grand Piano (Danish: PH Flyglet) The design was the result of a commission from a Danish piano manufacturing company called Andreas Christensen that terminated piano production in the 1960s. The PH Grand Piano is displayed in several museums of art and design, including the Metropolitan Museum in New York and the Danish Design Museum in Copenhagen. It was also used by Alvar Aalto for the music room in his Villa Mairea. The PH Grand Piano is produced and marketed by Toneart A/S (doing business as PH Pianos) under exclusive, worldwide license from the Henningsen family estate.	1930
	PH Four-Shade Lamp (Danish: PH Firskærmslampe) (later called the Charlottenborg pendant) This four-shade fixture has an additional trumpet-shaped top shade than the three-shade system. This additional shade was added to increase horizontal illumination on walls for art exhibits or large event spaces. It was discontinued in the 1940s, but was relaunched and slightly redesigned in 1979 for the Kunsthal Charlottenborg under the new PH 6½–6 size. The lamp is colloquially called the Charlottenborg pendant after the relaunch.	1931
	PH Snake Chair The PH Snake Chair is made up of one single steel tube that shapes the base and the back of the chair. It was part of a collection consisting of eight steel tube pieces that were presented at the Danish Fair for Industrial Design and Products in 1932. The collection was never put in serial production nor marketed during Poul Henningsen's lifetime. Today it is produced under exclusive worldwide license by PH Furniture in Copenhagen.	1932
	PH Snake Stool Unlike traditional stools with four legs, the seat of the PH Snake Stool is supported by one continuous curve of steel tubing. It was not possible in the 1930s to do a serial production of the PH Snake Stool. Consequently, the PH Snake Stool was not produced nor marketed during Poul Henningsen's lifetime. Today the furniture pieces designed by Poul Henningsen are produced by PH Furniture in Copenhagen.	1932
	PH Pope Chair The PH Pope Chair features the same resemblance to the roots of a tree by the shape of the legs and a similar design can be found on the PH Arm Chair and the PH Lounge Table. The shape of the back of the PH Pope Chair is strongly influenced by a pope hat and Poul Henningsen named the chair in accordance with that specific design. By doing so, PH commenced the "baptizing" practice that was used subsequently by other designers in their naming of products. The design of the PH Pope Chair prioritises the comfort of sitting down with its discreet back support without looking like a traditional orthopedic chair. Created to be functional and ergonomic while keeping the importance of style and form, the PH Pope Chair is proof that these can co-exist.	1932
	PH Pianette The PH Pianette is a musical design sculpture that used to be produced with the spinet action that is no longer in production by any piano makers. New models of the PH Pianette are being produced with digital technology. The cabinet is constructed by use of wood, leather and metal parts.	1935
	PH Globen Lamp A shaded pendant lamp enclosed in a glass semi-sphere.	1935–36
	PH tableside lamp	1936
	PH Bow Grand Piano (Danish: PH Bueflyglet) The PH Bow Grand Piano is not as well known as the PH Grand Piano with the steel legs, leather rim and glasslid. The PH Bow Grand Piano is crafted by use of organic shapes and has a form that is in full line with a Scandinavian design tradition in contrast to the more traditional and heavier grand pianos or "black boxes" as they are also being called. In comparison to the iconic PH Grand Piano with glasslid, the PH Bow Grand Piano appears with a more discrete design where the bows of the lid has a remarkable similarity to the Opera House in Sydney, Australia, which was designed by the Danish architect Jørn Utzon several decades after Poul Henningsen's design of the PH Bow Grand Piano. The resemblances with the Opera House in Sydney emphasizes the musical and acoustic qualities of this unique grand piano produced of the absolutely highest quality.	1937
	PH Upright Piano This piano has the same design hallmarks of its larger counterpart, the PH Grand Piano. Fundamental to the shape of PH Upright Piano is a minimal body that is sleek, fluidly shaped and devoid of the hard angles that is expected of a standard equivalent 'upright piano'.	1939
	PH Mirror The back-cover is a curved piece of metal where the sharp edge is folded into itself. The mirror itself is attached to 3 arms and appears to be floating inside the cover. Behind the mirror is the lightsource which results in a soft ringlight effect around the mirror. The PH Mirror used to be produced by the lighting company Louis Poulsen that also produces all the iconic PH Lamps, however, the PH Mirror is now produced and sold by the company ToneArt Interior ApS, which holds the exclusive rights to produce and market the full collection of furniture and interior items designed by Poul Henningsen.	1939
	Spiral Lamp (Danish: Spirallampe) Created for Aarhus University.	1943
	Tivoli Lamp A variation of the Spiral Lamp for Aarhus University in 1943, these rotating lamps were placed around Tivoli Lake in Tivoli Gardens. Henningsen designed the lamps to spread the light horizontally but not upwards so that the light would not be seen from enemy airplanes, enabling the park to stay open until midnight despite the mandated wartime blackouts. The original motors proved not to be sufficiently powerful and after a few years of operation, they failed. The lamps continued to provide light but no longer rotated. In Spring 2008, Louis Poulsen created 101 new Tivoli Lamps for the park that rotate as Henningsen's original design intended.	1949
	Custom double-spiral wall light (unofficial name) Wall-mounted lamp designed for the Scala Cinema and Concert Hall at the Aarhus Theater. One of the original 26 lamps sold for $212,500 in 2010.	1955
	PH Axe Table The inspiration for the design came after Poul Henningsen's visit to Canada. He saw beyond the strong and simple traits of the axe to chop wood and identified the potential for reinvention to a sturdy table where the legs of the first models were created in hickory wood. The most commonly used materials for manufacturing axe hafts in Europe were ash and oak in the Middle Ages. By using these materials to produce the PH Axe Table homage was paid to the simple object that inspired Poul Henningsens innovative design. The PH Axe Table doesn't change the features of the shape of the axe haft but uses it to its advantage and makes it a feature of the design. The PH Axe Table comes with a PH Table Lamp installed in the middle of the top plate.	1954
	PH Louvre / PH Snowball (Danish: PH Kuglen) Designed for the Adventist Church in Skodsborg, Denmark. The Louvre has 13 shades and the Snowball as 8. The Louvre is pictured.	1957 / 1958
	PH Artichoke (Danish: PH Kogle) Originally created for the Langelinie Pavilion.	1958
	PH5 Pendant	1958
	PH Plate Lamp (Danish: PH Tallerken) Along with the Artichoke lamp, this lamp was also created for the Langelinie Pavilion.	1958
	Theater Chair (Danish: PH Teaterstol) Chairs created for Allé-Scenen (now called the Betty Nansen Teatret). When the seat is folded up, it reveals the seat number. This chair is part of the Trapholt's collection. This chair is featured on the cover of Furniture Boom by Lars Dybdahl.	1959
	PH Contrast (Danish: PH Kontrast) It was of the most expensive of Henningsen's lamps to produce because the paint and varnish work required 130 steps. It was discontinued in 1991. This lamp was made up of ten lacquered metal shades. Each shade has four different colors: white, chrome, orange, and blue. The center rod that holds the bulb could be adjusted up and down. This allows the user to adjust the color temperature from cool to warm by moving the center rod.	1962

== Design gallery ==
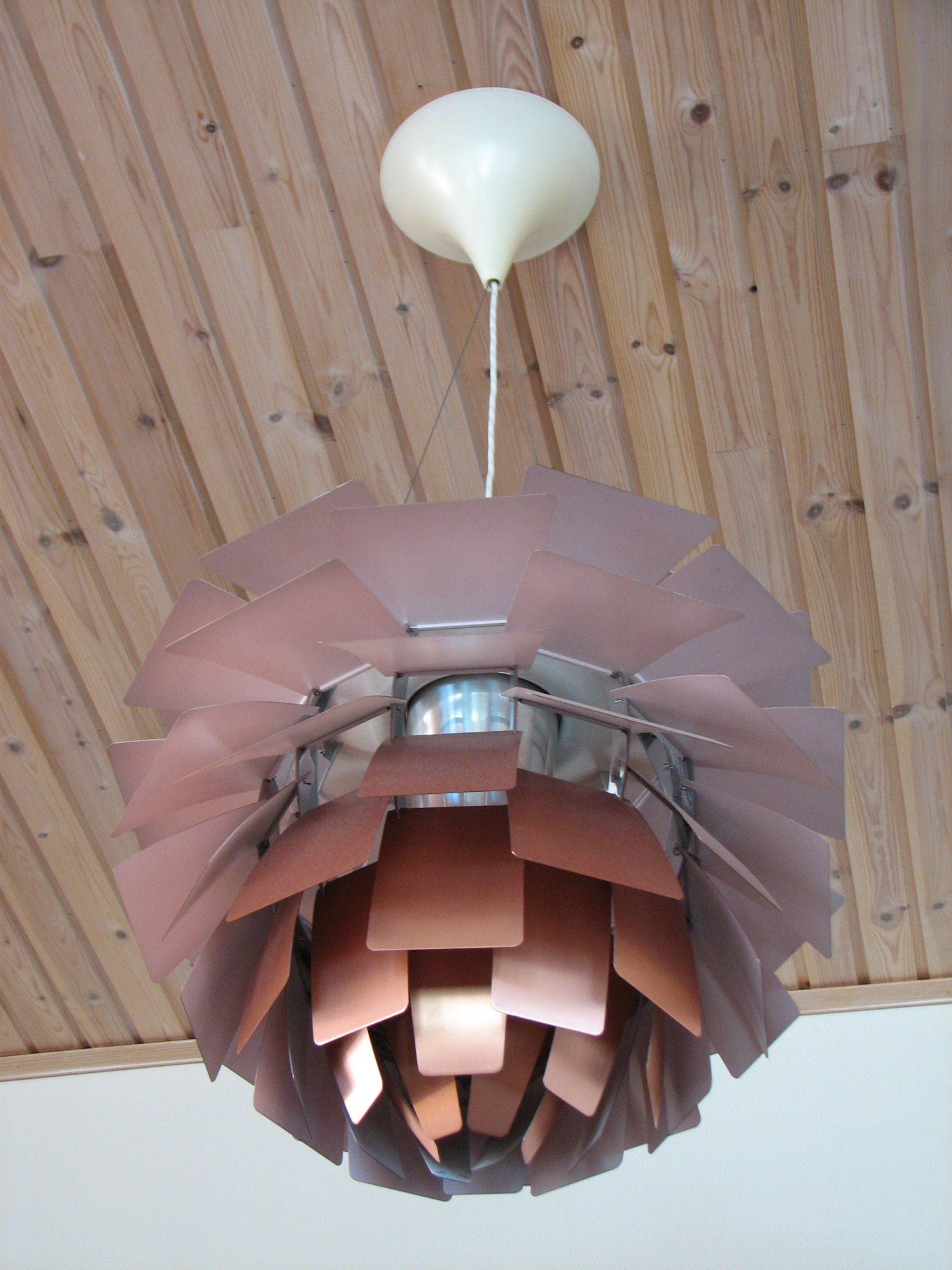
PH Artichoke

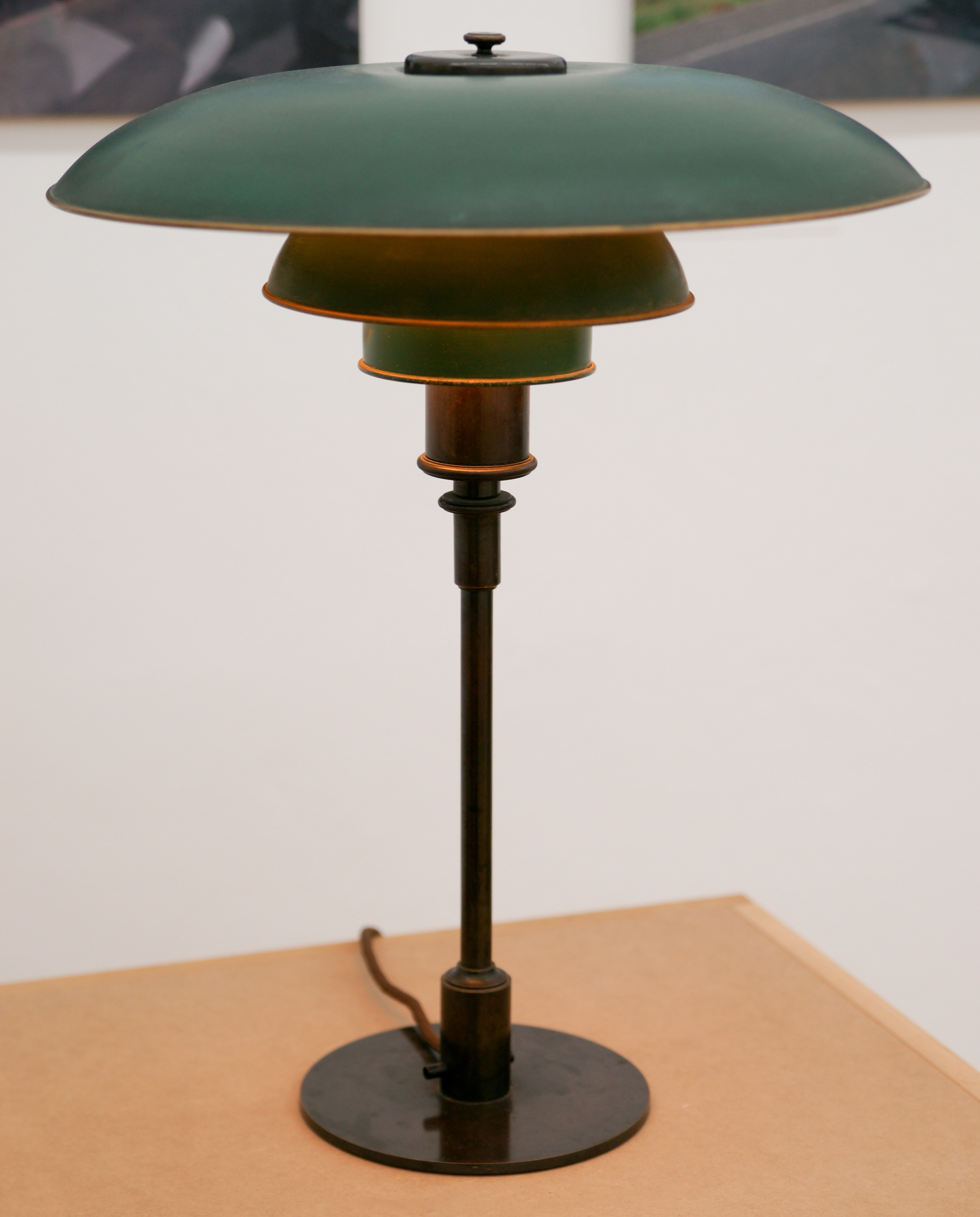
PH 1941 lamp

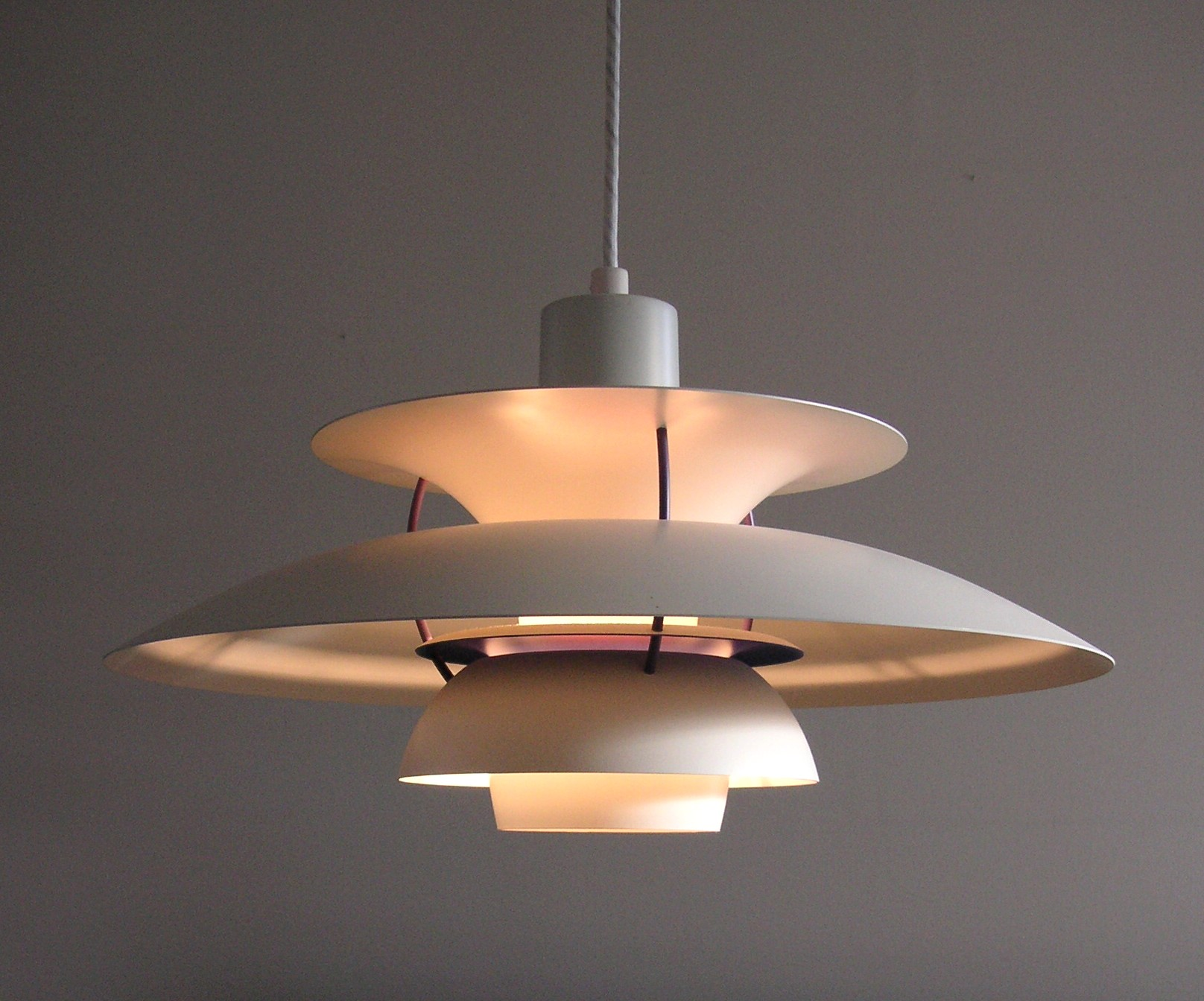
PH-5 lamp

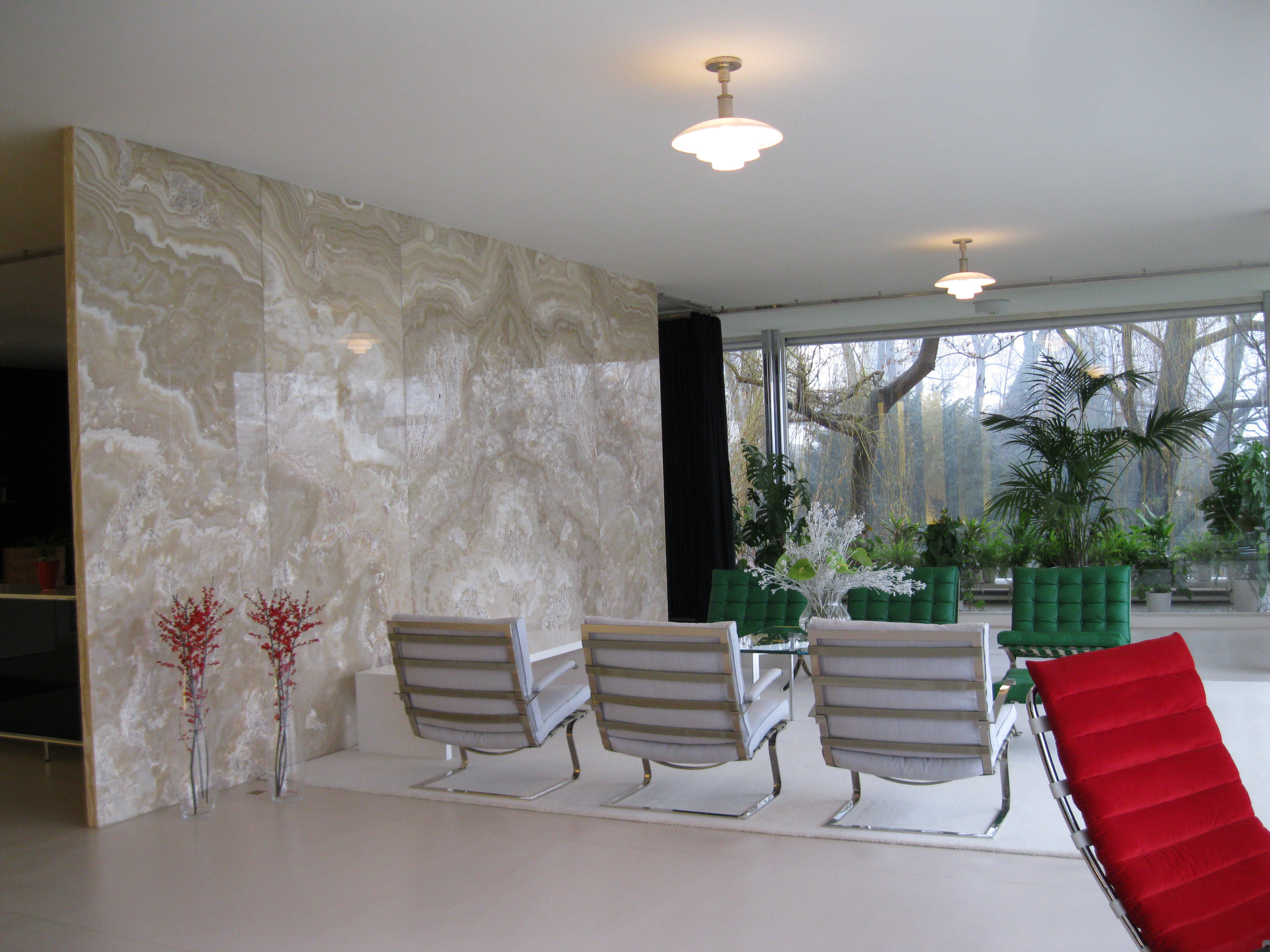
PH lamps at Vila Tugendhat

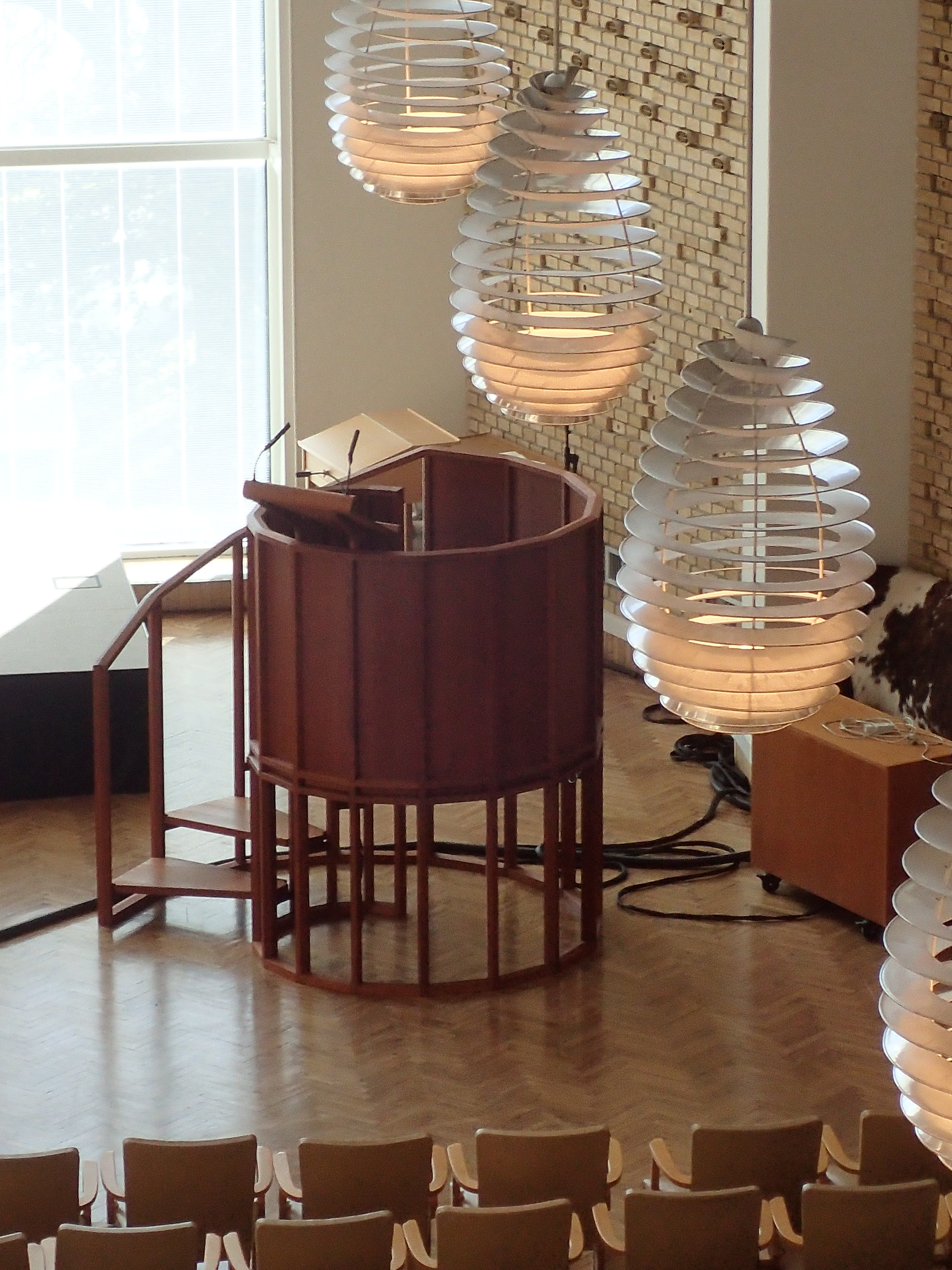
Spiral Lamps at Aarhus University

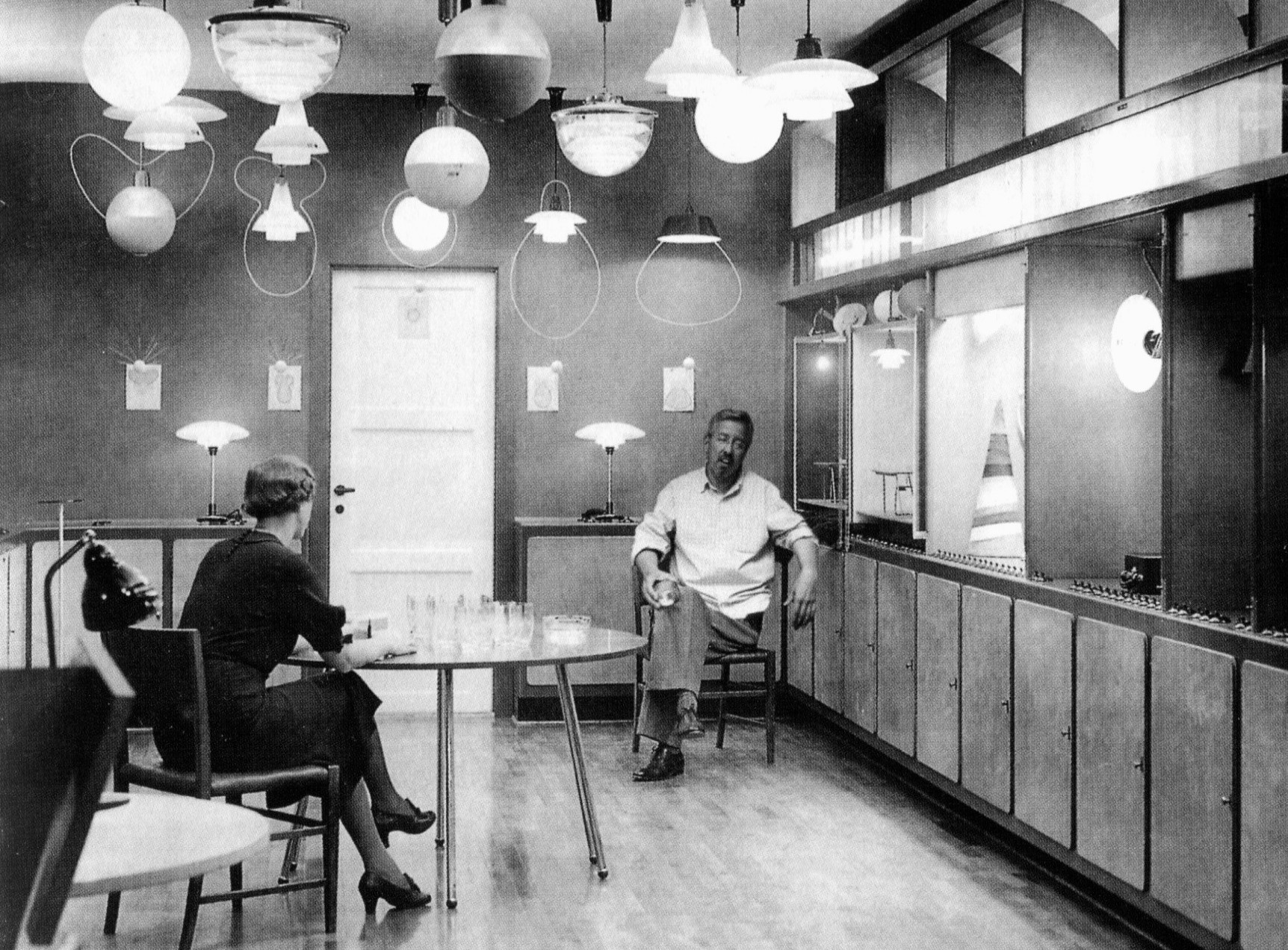
Louis Poulsen's exhibition room in Nyhavn (1939)

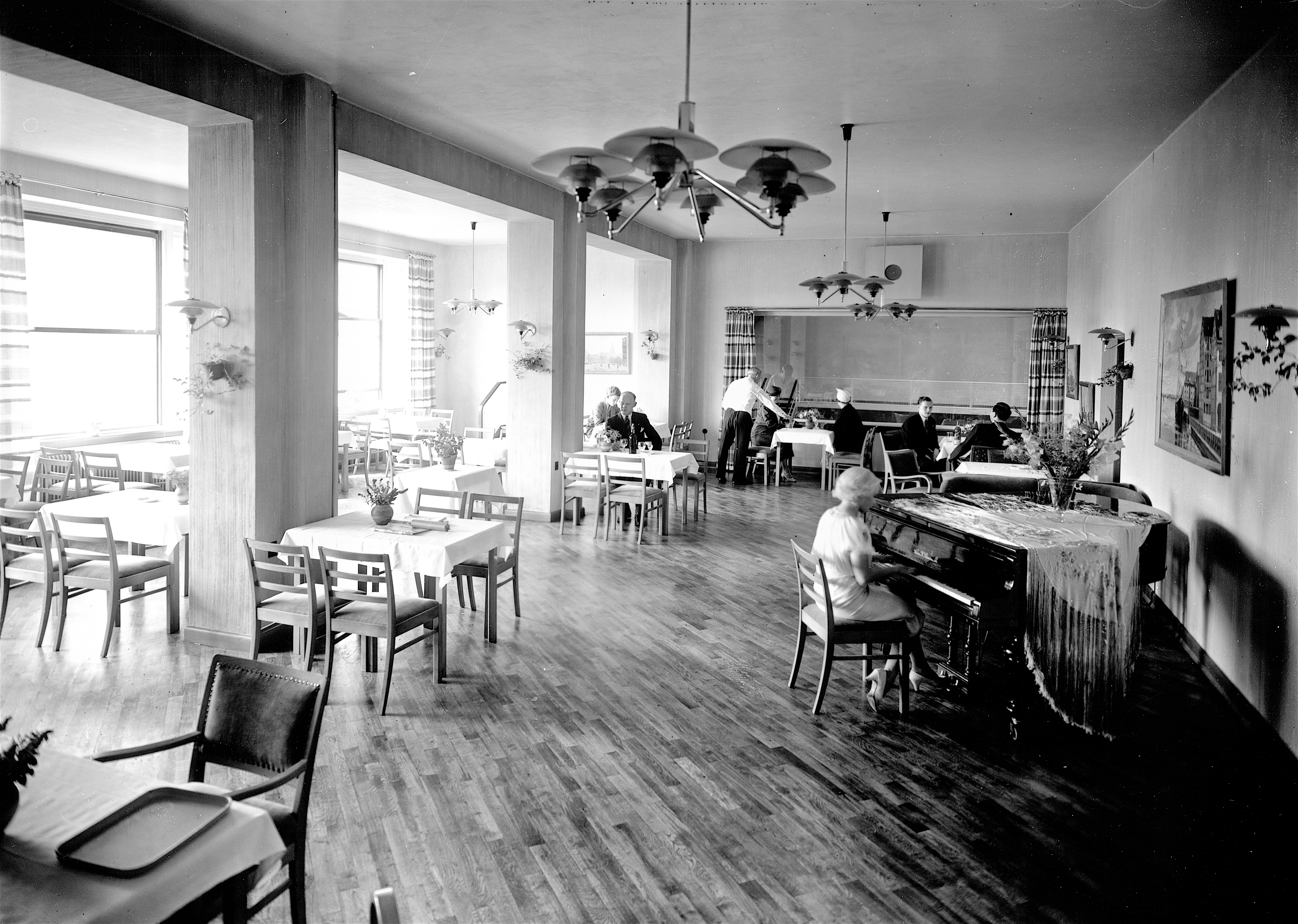
Academy Crown lamp in Copenhagen restaurant (1937)

== See also ==
- Danish Modern
- Danish design
- Cultural radicalism
