= Agnes Henningsen =

Danish writer and activist (1868–1962)

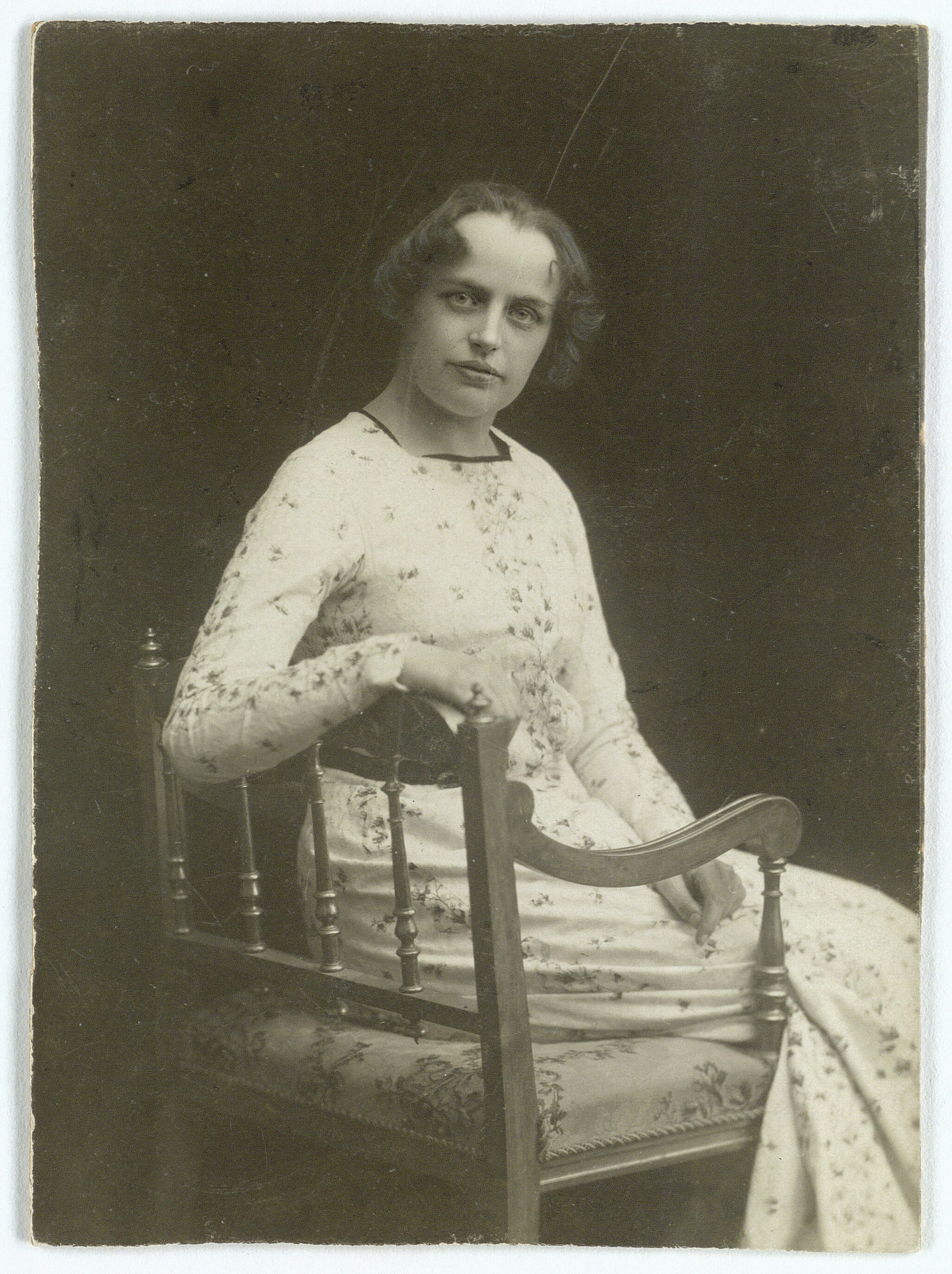
- Portrait of Agnes Henningsen by Frederik Riise
- Born: November 18, 1868; Skovsbo Manor, Funen, Denmark
- Died: April 21, 1962 (aged 93)
- Occupations: writer, activist
- Children: 4, including Poul Henningsen

Agnes Kathinka Malling Henningsen (18 November 1868 – 21 April 1962) was a Danish writer and an activist for sexual freedom. Her writings were centred on love and sex, as was her own life. She sometimes published stories under the pen name Helga Maynert.

== Early life and education ==
Henningsen was born on the Skovsbo estate in the south of Funen, where her father was the farmer. Henningsen's parents died when she was a child, and she and her sister were sent to a girls boarding school at Antvorskov near Slagelse. After the events in her family, Henningsen remained an atheist for the rest of her life.

== Career ==
She married Mads Henningsen, a schoolteacher, with whom she had three children. The marriage ended in divorce after he left her to emigrate to America. Henningsen then had a relationship with the writer Carl Ewald, who became the father of her fourth child, the architect and designer Poul Henningsen. As a single mother, Agnes Henningsen earned a living for a time as a hairdresser in central Copenhagen but later devoted all her time to writing.

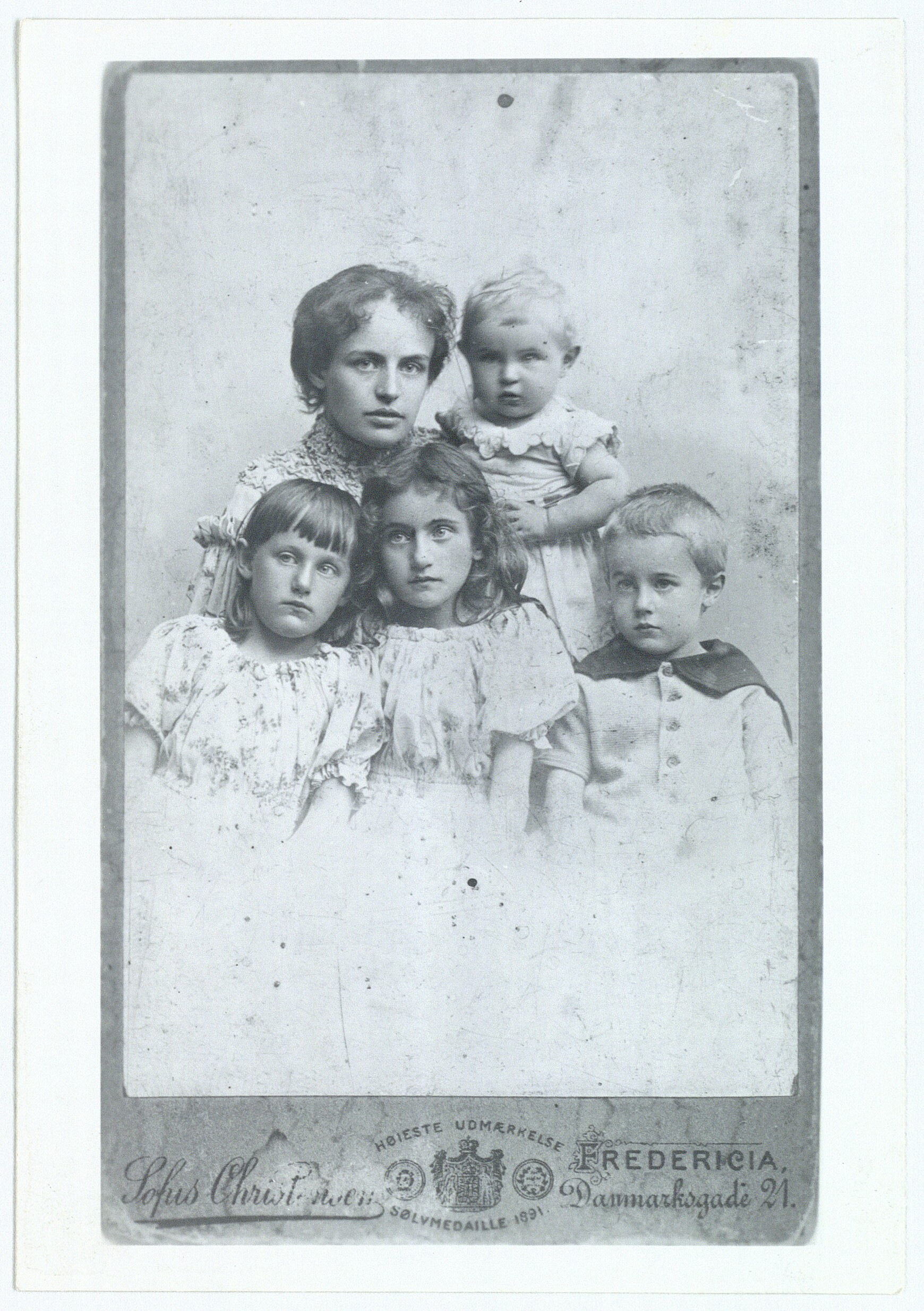
Agnes Henningsen with her children

While still married, Henningsen developed a friendship with Herman Bang. In 1891, Bang assisted her in publishing a number of short stories in the newspaper København under the pen name Helga Maynert. After a number of difficult years in Copenhagen, in 1898 Henningsen moved to Roskilde where she was able to concentrate on writing. In 1899, she published her first novel, Glansbilledet (Scrap Picture), immediately followed by Strømmen (The Current). Influenced by Bang's impressionism, both depict somewhat frigid, depressive women who suffer from a lack of work and staid egocentric attitudes.

In 1900, Henningsen began a period of frequent travel, successive new lovers and interesting friendships with figures from Copenhagen's cultural scene which led to her portraits of Gustav Wied, Holger Drachmann and Georg Brandes. After spending a lengthy period in Poland, in 1901 she gained literary fame with Polens Døtre (Poland's Daughters), an intimate work describing the unhappy relationships two women have with the same man, as a result of their platonic views and misgivings about sex. Here Henningsen develops a much more direct style of her own, free from Bang's influence. In 1919, she married the writer Simon Koch but continued her extramarital relationships, refusing to adopt the conventions of the bourgeoisie. Her most successful works are her eight volumes of memoirs (Erindringer) from 1941 to 1955, tracing the various episodes of her life: Let Gang paa Jorden (Stepping Lightly on the Ground), Letsindighedens Gave (Gift of Recklessness), Byen erobret (City Conquered), Kærlighedssynder (Sins of Love), Dødsfjende-Hjertenskær (Mortal Enemy-Heartthrob), Jeg er Levemand (I'm Alive), Den rige Fugl (The Rich Bird) and Skygger over Vejen (Shadows on the Road).

== Legacy ==
For most of her life, Henningsen was criticized by her contemporaries for her liberal sexual views and behaviour, but she later saw more positive interest in her work from the younger generation. When the Danish Academy was founded in 1960, she was one of its two female members, the other being Karen Blixen.
