= Skovsbo Manor =

Manor house in Kerteminde Municipality, Denmark

Skovsbo Castle
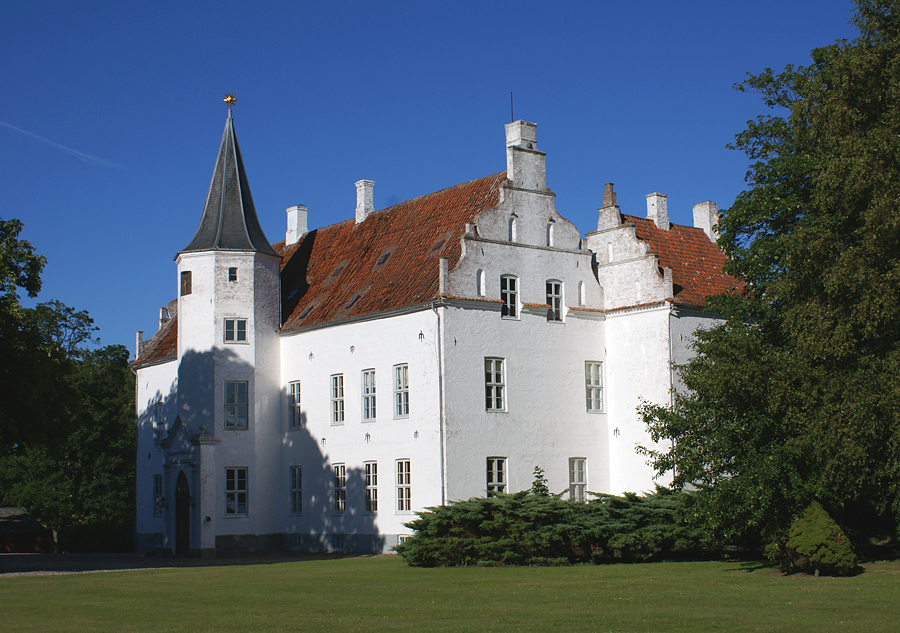
- Skovsbo viewed from the south-west
- Interactive map of the Skovsbo Castle area

General information
- Architectural style: Renaissance
- Location: Kerteminde Municipality, Denmark
- Coordinates: 55°23′35″N 10°37′57″E
- Construction started: 1572
- Completed: 1579
- Client: Erik Hardenberg

Skovsbo Castle is a manor house located 6 km south-west of Kerteminde, Funen, Denmark. The main building dates from the 1570s and is built in the Renaissance style.

== History ==
Skovsbo traces its history back to the 14th century. The castle seen today was built from 1572 to 1579 for privy councillor Erik Hardenberg (1534–1604).

Some of the land was sold off in lots in 1914.

Skovsby was in 2006 acquired by Jens Belling for circa FKK 66.5 million- In 2020, it was sold to Thomas Kirk Kristiansen.

== Architecture ==
Built in the Renaissance style, with Dutch gables, Skovsbo consists of two floors over a vaulted basement and an octagonal staircase tower with a spire to the west. An appendix in the south-eastern corner, with a second staircase, dates from the original house while another appendix built to a similar design at the north-eastern corner was added in 1891 by the architect August Klein (1839–1902).

== Skovsbo Crucifix ==
Across the road from Skovsbo stands a roadside crucifix which was installed in about 1600 by Anna Rønnow, the wife of Erik Hardenberg, who unlike her husband was a Catholic. It is the second oldest roadside crucifix in Denmark, second only to the Crucifix of Holy Anders near Slagelse.

== Notable people ==
- Agnes Henningsen (1868–1962), Danish writer and an activist for sexual freedom; born on the Skovsbo estate, where her father was the farmer

== Skovsbo today ==
The estate covers 183 hectares of land. It is privately owned, and was sold in 2006 for the price of DKK 66.5 million.

== List of owners ==
- (1359–1369) Tue Nielsen Bild
- (1369–1410) Niels Tuesen Bild
- (1410–1450) Tove Andersdatter Hvide gift Bild
- (1450–1452) Johanne Nielsdatter Bild gift Lykke
- (1452–1458) Peder Lykke
- (1458–1480) Niels Lykke
- (1480–1541) Joachim Lykke
- (1541–1562) Peder Lykke
- (1562–1565) Eiler Hardenberg
- (1565–1604) Erik Hardenberg
- (1604–1609) Anne Eilersdatter Rønnow gift Hardenberg
- (1609) Mette Eriksdatter Hardenberg gift Gyldenstierne
- (1609–1616) Preben Gyldenstierne
- (1616–1629) Mette Eriksdatter Hardenberg gift Gyldenstierne
- (1629–1640) Knud Gyldenstierne
- (1640–1669) Henrik Gyldenstierne
- (1669–1680) Lisbeth Podebusk gift Gyldenstierne
- (1680–1689) Erik Lykke / Claus Brockenhuus / Eiler Brockenhuus
- (1689–1694) Erik Lykke / Claus Brockenhuus
- (1694–1701) Erik Lykke
- (1701–1705) Øllegaard Sehested gift (1) Lykke (2) Rosenkrantz
- (1705–1736) Christian Rosenkrantz
- (1736–1767) Frederikke Louise Krag gift Rosenkrantz
- (1767–1769) Hans Berg
- (1769–1803) Olave Marie Lange gift Berg
- (1803–1824) Jens Magnus Berg
- (1824–1844) Johanne Francisca von Westen gift Berg
- (1844–1851) Christian von Westen Berg
- (1851–1853) Enke Fru von Westen Berg
- (1853–1865) F. C. G. Busck
- (1865–1874) Frederik Ludvig Vilhelm lensgreve Ahlefeldt-Laurvig
- (1874–1912) Julius Ludvig greve Ahlefeldt-Laurvig-Bille
- (1912–1914) Jessie baronesse Bille-Brahe gift Ahlefeldt-Laurvig-Bille
- (1914) Udstykningsforening For Sjælland Og Fyns Stifter
- (1914) P. Christensen
- (1914–1915) Mejeriejer Jensen
- (1915–1916) Mads Larsen
- (1916–1923) K. Brandt
- (1923–1946) Kai Gustav Hamann
- (1946–1972) Aage Johannes Fast
- (1972–2006) Per Haustrup Normann
- (2006–2020) Jens Belling
- (2020–present) Thomas Kirk Kristiansen
