= PH Grand Piano =

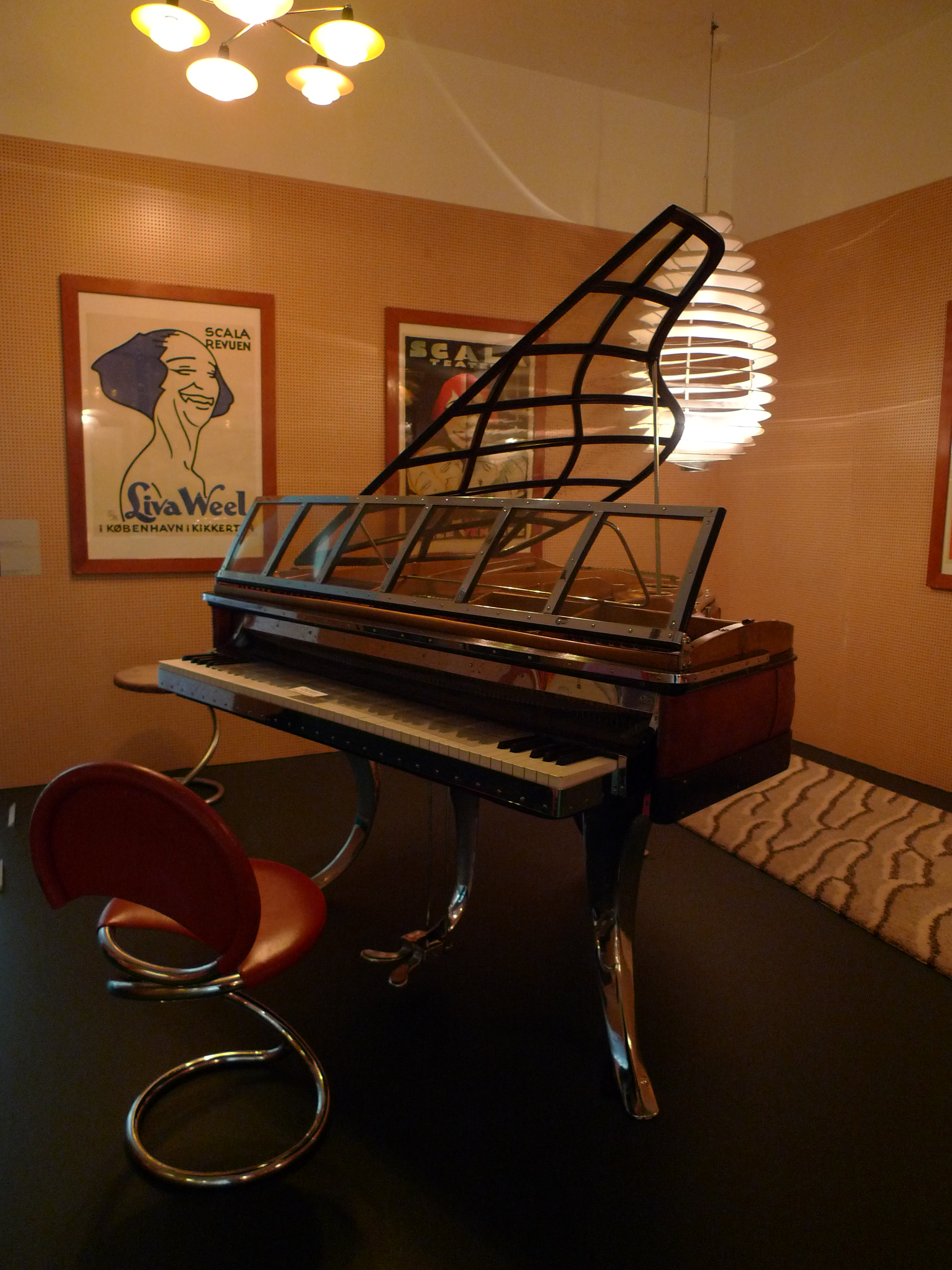
Poul Henningsen: The PH Grand Piano

The PH Grand Piano is a grand piano model designed in 1930 by Danish architect and writer Poul Henningsen.

The design was the result of a commission from a Danish piano manufacturing company called Andreas Christensen that terminated piano production decades ago. The PH Grand Piano is on display in several museums of art and design, including the Metropolitan Museum in New York and the Danish Design Museum in Copenhagen. It was also used by Alvar Aalto for the music room in his Villa Mairea.

In 1935 Poul Henningsen (PH) designed the PH Pianette and PH continued the piano design with the PH Bow Grand Piano from 1937 as well as the PH Upright Piano in 1939.

Today, all piano models designed by Poul Henningsen are produced by the Danish company ToneArt A/S (PH Pianos) that holds the world wide, exclusive rights to produce, market and sell all PH Pianos under license of the Poul Henningsen family.

All the PH Pianos are illustrated and documented in the publication: PH Furniture & Pianos – The Revival of Poul Henningsen Design Classics. The book was published in March 2020 (read the book under the external link for the official website of PH Pianos).

== See also ==
- Danish modern
