= Christiansborg Slotsplads =

Public square in Copenhagen, Denmark

Coordinates: 55.6765°N 12.5812°E

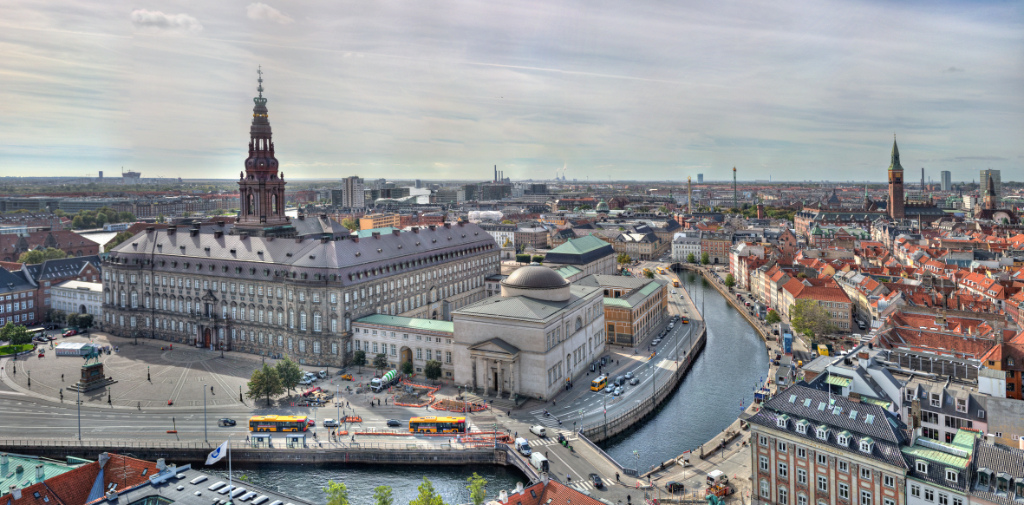
Christiansborg Slotsplads located between Christiansborg Palace and the Slotsholm canal.

Christiansborg Slotsplads (English: Christiansborg Palace Square) is a public square on the island of Slotsholmen in the centre of Copenhagen, Denmark. It is located in front of Christiansborg Palace. Due to its large size, central location and close affiliation with the central government building, it has for centuries been a hub of political life in Denmark and is a popular venue for a variety of demonstrations, celebrations and events.

== Cultural references ==
Christiansborg Slotsplads is used as a location at 0:59:11 in the 1974 Olsen-banden film The Last Exploits of the Olsen Gang.
