= Männistö (disambiguation) =

Männistö may refer to:

- Männistö (surname), surname list
- Männistö
- Männistö Church
