= Sauli Zinovjev =

Finnish composer (born 1988)

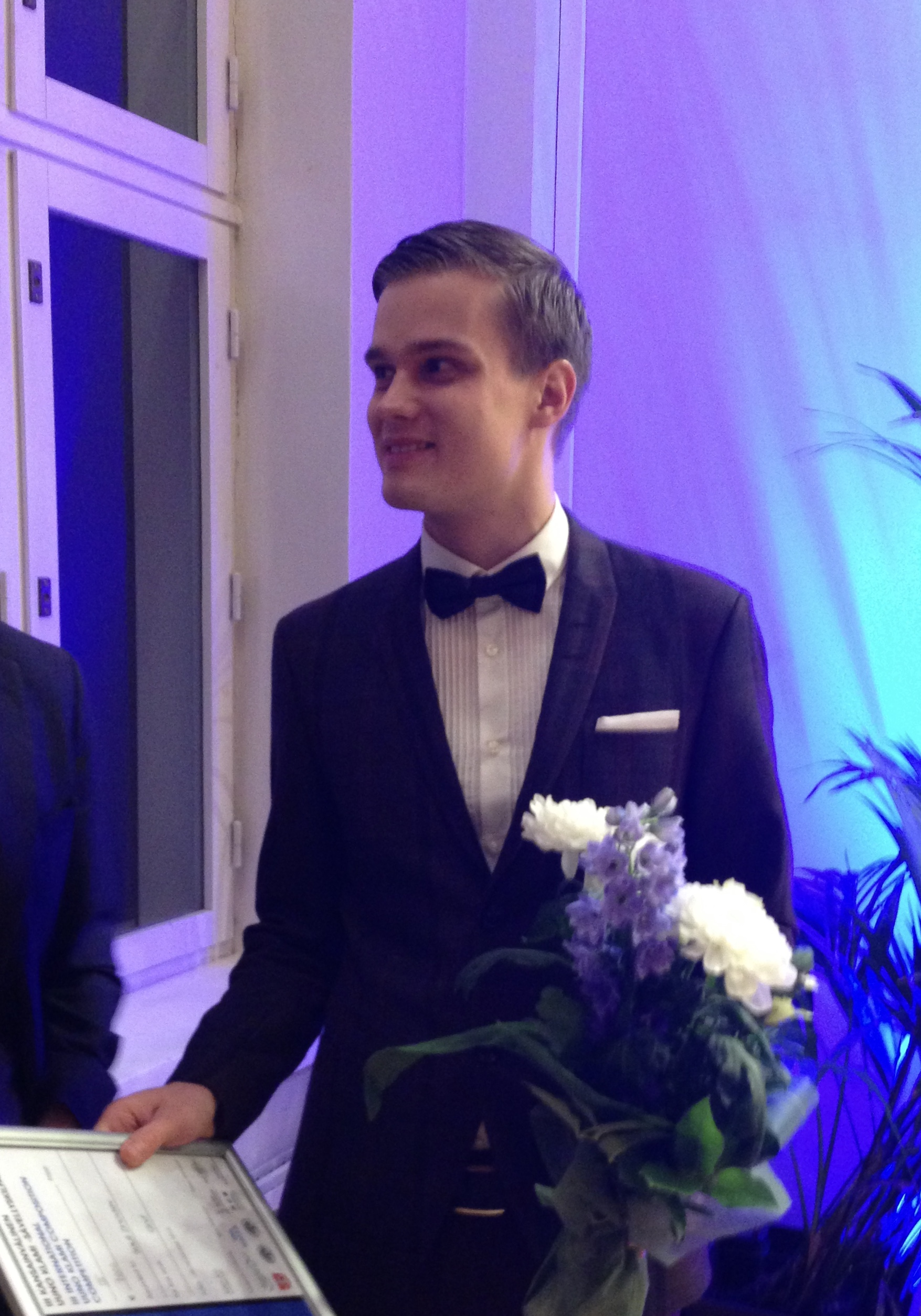
Zinovjev in 2014

Sauli Zinovjev (born 1988) is a Finnish composer. Zinovjev was born in Lahti, and studied composition in Sibelius Academy (2010–15) and in HfM-Karlsruhe (2013–14) under guidance of Tapio Nevanlinna and Wolfgang Rihm. Zinovjev's works are published exclusively by HarrisonParrott's Birdsong Music Publishing.

Zinovjev's focus has been on orchestral music and his works have been performed by for example Chicago Symphony Orchestra, Royal Concertgebouw Orchestra, Oslo Philharmonic, Bamberg Symphony Swedish Radio Symphony Orchestra, Finnish Radio Symphony Orchestra and Helsinki Philharmonic Orchestra in collaboration with musicians such as Klaus Mäkelä, Pekka Kuusisto, Sakari Oramo, André de Ridder and Okko Kamu . For the season 2021-2022 Zinovjev was granted a fellowship to the Internationales Künstlerhaus Villa Concordia and in 2019 he was appointed as the Composer-in-Residence of the 60th Turku music festival. In the Autumn 2025 Zinovjev starts a two-year residency with the Lahti Symphony Orchestra.

On the concert season 2021–2022 Zinovjev's music debuted with the Tokyo Metropolitan Symphony Orchestra and Müncher Philharmoniker. In January 2022 the pianist Víkingur Ólafsson premiered a new Piano concerto by Sauli Zinovjev with the Finnish Radio Symphony Orchestra and Klaus Mäkelä. In October 2024 percussionist Vivi Vassileva premiered Zinovjev's percussion concerto A Savage Beat with the Beethoven Orchester Bonn and Dirk Kaftan.

In 2014 Zinovjev's composition "Gryf" was awarded the 3rd prize in the 3rd International Uuno Klami Composition Competition.

Zinovjev is of Finnish and Russian descent.

== Main works ==
- Taste of Metal symphony (2024), 40', orchestra (3343/4331/1+4/harp/organ/archi), commissioned by the Helsinki Philharmonic, Oslo Philharmonic and the Orchestre de Paris
- Percussion Concerto "A Savage Beat" (2024), 35' percussion solo and orchestra (3333/4331/1+2/perc solo/archi), commissioned by the Beethoven Orchester Bonn, Luxembourg Philharmonic and Wiener Konzerthaus
- Wiegenlied (2020), 11', orchestra (3333/4331/1+3/arpa/archi), commissioned by the Oslo Philharmonic, Gothenburg Symphony and Helsinki Philharmonic Orchestras
- Piano concerto (2019), 27', piano solo and orchestra (2333/4331/1+3/solo pf./archi), commissioned by the Finnish and Swedish Radio Symphony Orchestras
- "Un Grande Sospiro" (2018), 22, orchestra (2222/2200/2/archi), commissioned by Tapiola Sinfonietta, Kymi Sinfonietta & Orchestre de Chambre de Lausanne
- "Die Welt - Ein Tor", 16', cello solo and orchestra (2222/2200/1+1/solo vlc./archi), commissioned by the Paulo Foundation
- Violin concerto "Der Leiermann" (2017), 23', violin solo and orchestra (2232/4330/1+1/hp/solo vl./archi), commissioned by the Oulu Sinfonia
- "Batteria" (2016), 10', orchestra (3333/4331/1+3/pf+hp/archi), commissioned by the Finnish Radio Symphony Orchestra

== Discography ==
- "Recharged" - Malin Broman & Ostrobothnian Chamber Orchestra (Alba, 2023)
- "Sospirando 2" - Harri Kuusijärvi & Markus Hohti (SZ Publishing, 2020)
- "Batteria" - Finnish Radio Symphony Orchestra & Andre de Ridder (SZ Publishing, 2019)
- "Piano Quartet Chasse-Neige" - Ensemble Recherche (SZ Publishing, 2019)
- "Chained" - Harri Kuusijärvi (A Live, Art First Records, 2017)
- Elegietta - Otto Tolonen (Toccata, Sibarecords SACD-1011, 2013)
