= Männistö (surname) =

Männistö is a Finnish surname. Notable people with the surname include:

- Lasse Männistö (born 1982), Finnish politician and executive
- Lauha Männistö (1934–2017), Finnish politician

== See also ==
- Männistö
