= Juha Leiviskä =

Finnish architect and designer (1936–2023)

- Born: 17 March 1936; Helsinki, Finland
- Died: 9 November 2023 (aged 87); Helsinki, Finland
- Occupation: Architect
- Awards: Pro Finlandia Medal (1992); Prince Eugen Medal (1994); Carlsberg Architectural Prize (1995); Antonio Feltrinelli Prize (2008)
- Practice: Arkkitehtitoimisto Helander-Leiviskä
- Buildings: Kouvola Town Hall, Kouvola; St. Thomas Church, Oulu; Myyrmäki Church, Vantaa; Männistö Church, Kuopio; Church of the Good Shepherd, Helsinki; Vallila Library, Helsinki; German Embassy, Helsinki; Ad-Dar Centre, Bethlehem; Swedish School of Social Science, Helsinki
- Design: JL341 Pendant Light; Helsinki City Transport bus and tram stop shelter

Juha Ilmari Leiviskä (17 March 1936 – 9 November 2023) was a Finnish architect and designer. He was especially known for his churches and other sacral buildings.

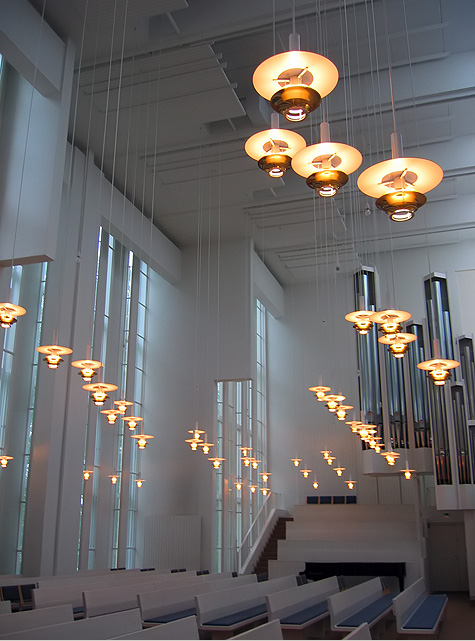
Myyrmäki Church, Vantaa, 1984.

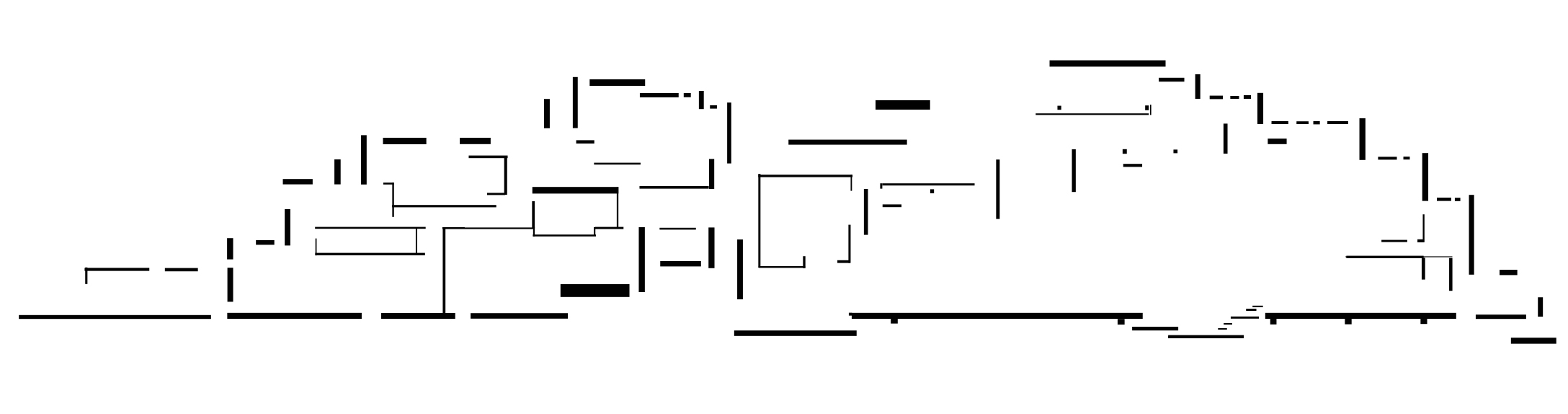
Myyrmäki Church, plan compositional analysis.

== Life and career ==
The son of engineer Toivo Ilmari Leiviskä and teacher Sonja Jämsén-Astala, Leiviskä studied architecture at Helsinki University of Technology, qualifying as an architect in 1963. He established his own office in 1964, while also working as a teaching assistant at Helsinki University of Technology.

Leiviskä also worked with architect Bertel Saarnio, and together they won the architectural competition for the Kouvola Town Hall (1964–68), regarded as one of the most significant public buildings in Finland during the 1960s, brought much critical attention to the young architect.

Leiviskä came to international attention during the 1970s, 1980s and 1990s with designs for churches in different parts of Finland, each employing a similar design language. His mature style combines the sensitivity to the dramatics of natural light of German Baroque churches, with compositional principles of Dutch De Stijl architecture of the 1920s, for instance in the way series of parallel, free-standing walls can define space yet deconstruct traditional notions of enclosure.

Leiviskä had a joint architect's office in Helsinki with architect Vilhelm Helander - Vilhelm Helander, Juha Leiviskä arkkitehdit SAFA.

Juha Leiviskä died on 9 November 2023, at the age of 87.

== Design ==
An integral part of the architecture of Leiviskä's churches was the lamps designed by the architect himself. Leiviskä stated that his lighting fixtures are based on the principles developed by the Danish designer Poul Henningsen for his PH-lamps. The lamps have been taken up as part of the lamps sold by the Artek company, also responsible for marketing the lamps designed by Alvar Aalto. Pendant lamps by Leiviskä are also featured in the British Library in London, designed by the English architect Sir Collin St John Wilson, whom Leiviskä knew personally.

Leiviskä also designed the JCDecaux bus and tram stop shelters used by the Helsinki City Transport company.

== Quote ==
Architecture is closer to music than to the visual arts. To qualify as architecture, buildings, together with their internal spaces and their details, must be an organic part of the environment, of its grand drama, of its movement and of its spatial sequences. To me, a building as it stands, "as a piece of architecture" is nothing. Its meaning comes only in counterpoint with its surroundings, with life and with light.

— Juha Leiviskä, Architecture and Urbanism, (April 1995) p. 13

== Awards ==
Leiviskä was made a member of the Royal Swedish Academy of Fine Arts in 1991. In 1992 he received Pro Finlandia Medal of the Order of the Lion of Finland, and was appointed an 'Artist Professor' by the Finnish President. In 1994 he was made an Honorary Fellow of the American Institute of Architects and awarded the Prince Eugen Medal the same year. He was awarded the prestigious Carlsberg Prize in architecture in 1995. In 1997 Leiviskä followed Alvar Aalto and Reima Pietilä in becoming the architecture Member of the Academy of Finland - thus bestowing on him the title of Akateemikko (Academician). In 2008 he was awarded the international Antonio Feltrinelli Prize by Accademia Nazionale dei Lincei, as well as RIBA International Fellowship. In 2020 Juha Leiviskä was awarded The Daylight Award in Architecture, for his works of architecture that demonstrate a unique ability to make daylight an integral element of buildings.

== A selection of buildings by Leiviskä ==
- Kouvola Town Hall, Kouvola (1968) (with Bertel Saario)
- Lemi Old Wooden Church, restoration, Lemi (1969)
- Nakkila Parish Centre, Nakkila (1970)
- St. Thomas's Church and Parish Centre, Puolivälinkangas, Oulu (1975)
- Old Student House, restoration, Helsinki (1980) (with Vilhelm Helander)
- Myyrmäki Church, Vantaa (1984)
- Kirkkonummi Parish Centre, Kirkkonummi (1984)
- Merikasarminkatu 7, housing complex, Helsinki (1984)
- Auditorium and workshop building, Niuvanniemi Hospital, Kuopio (with Vilhelm Helander) (1985)
- Villa Johanna, restoration, Helsinki (1986) (with Marica Schalin)
- Harju Chapel restoration and extension, Mikkeli
- Auroranlinna housing complex, Helsinki (1990) (with Pekka Kivisalo)
- Vallila Library and Daycare Centre, Helsinki (1991) (with Asta Björklund)
- Männistö Church, Kuopio (1992)
- German Embassy, Kuusisaari, Helsinki (1993)
- German Church and Parish Centre, Helsinki, restoration and extension (with Vilhelm Helander) (2001)
- Good Shepherd Church, Pakila, Helsinki, restoration and extension (with Vilhelm Helander) (2002)
- Ad-Dar Cultural and Conference Center, Bethlehem, Palestine (2005)
- Sandels Cultural Centre, Helsinki (2007) (with Rosemarie Schnitzler)
- Swedish School of Social Science, Helsinki (2009) (with Jari Heikkinen)
- Kipparintalo housing, Kalasatama, Helsinki (2015)

== Gallery of works by Juha Leiviskä ==
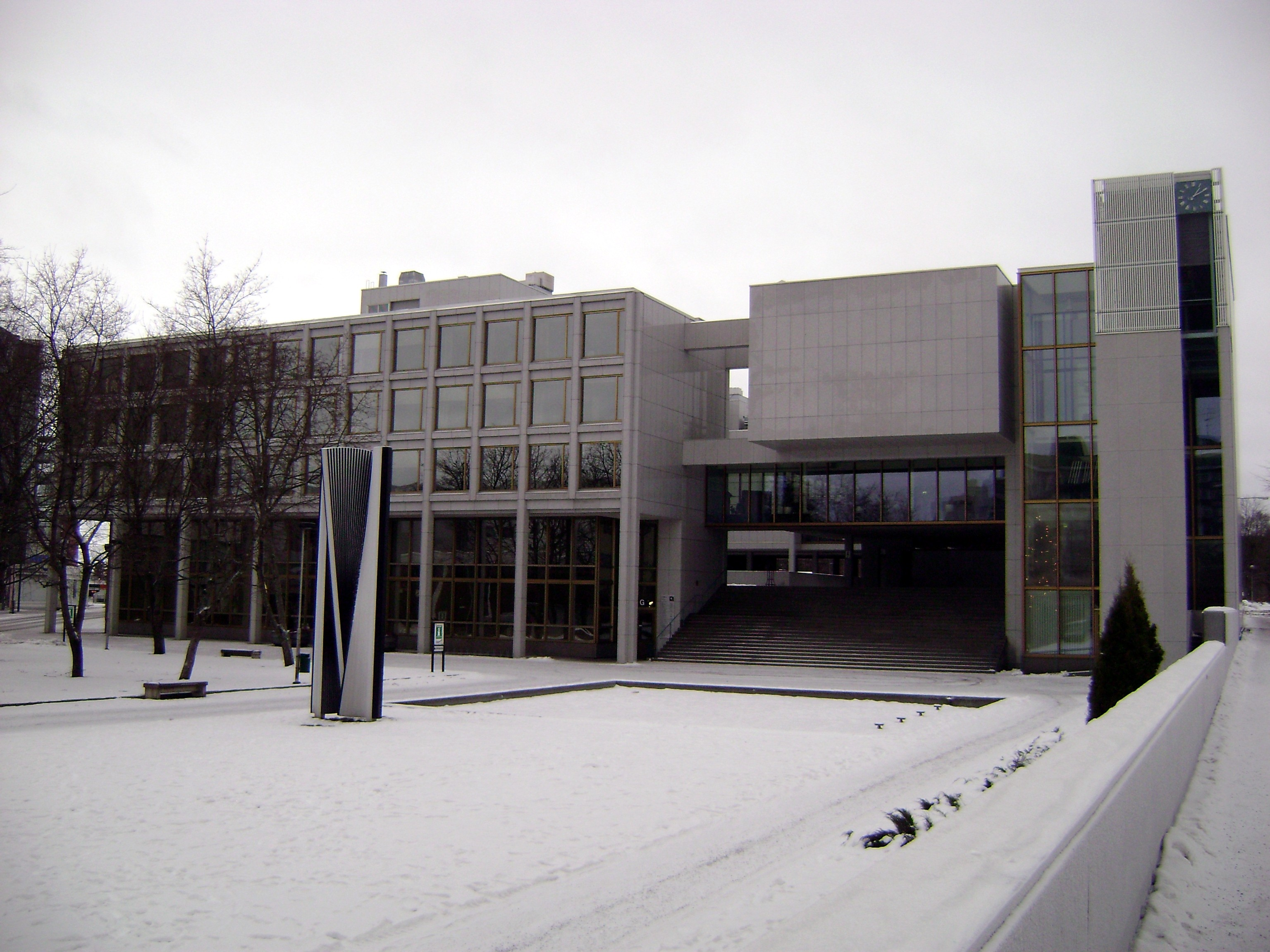
Kouvola Town Hall (with Bertel Saario), 1968.

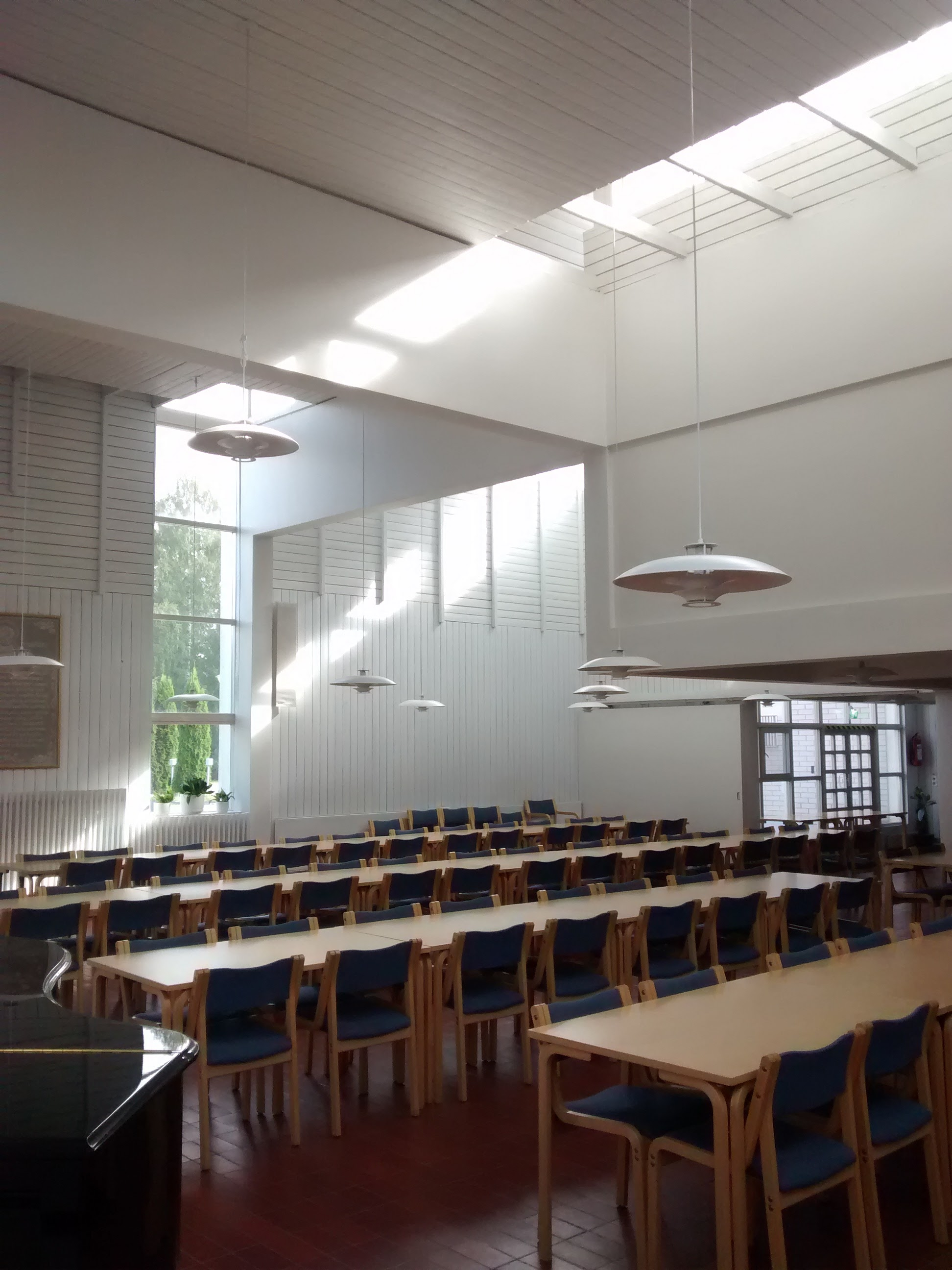
Nakkila Parish Centre, 1970.

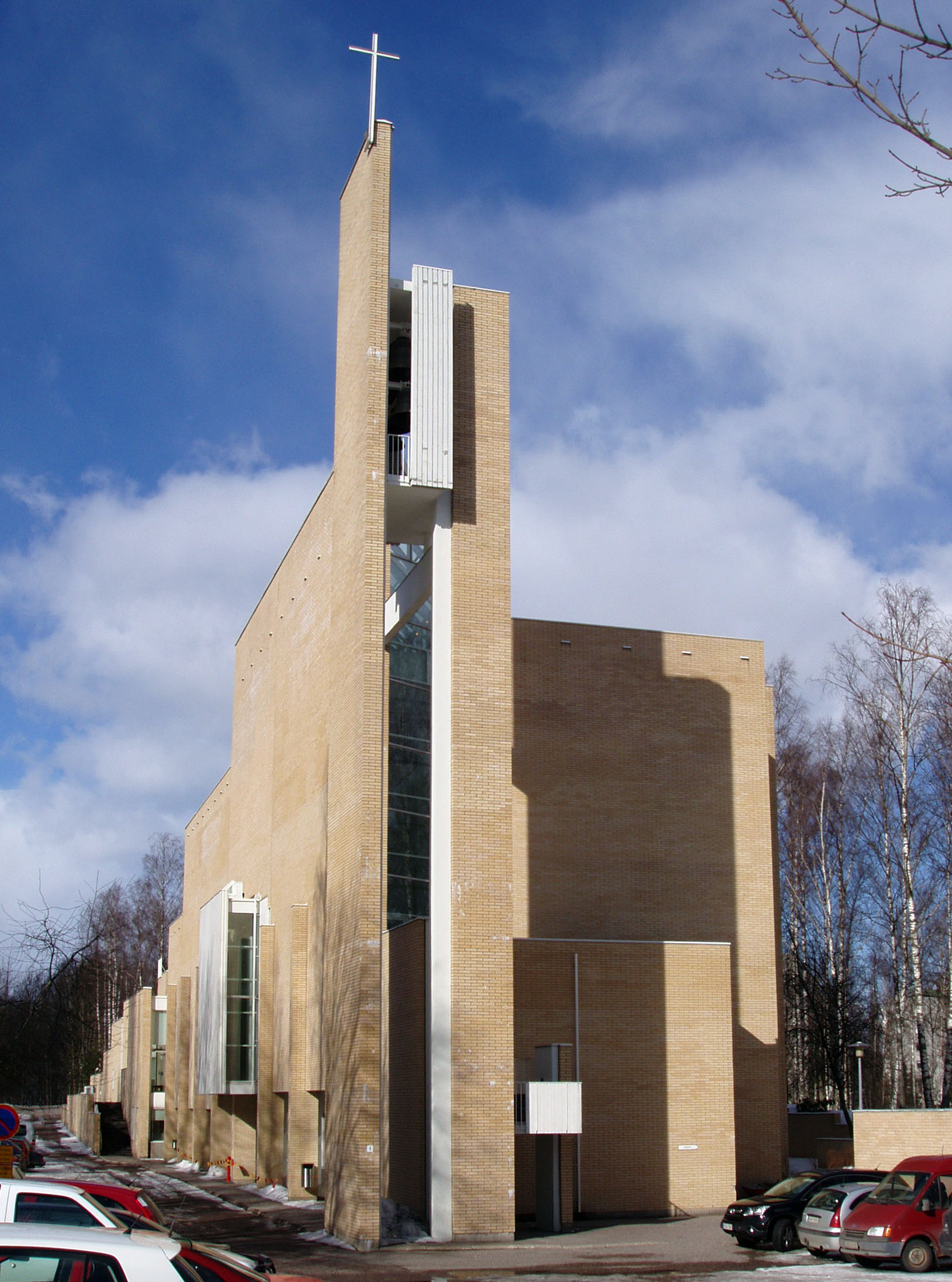
Myyrmäki Church, 1984.

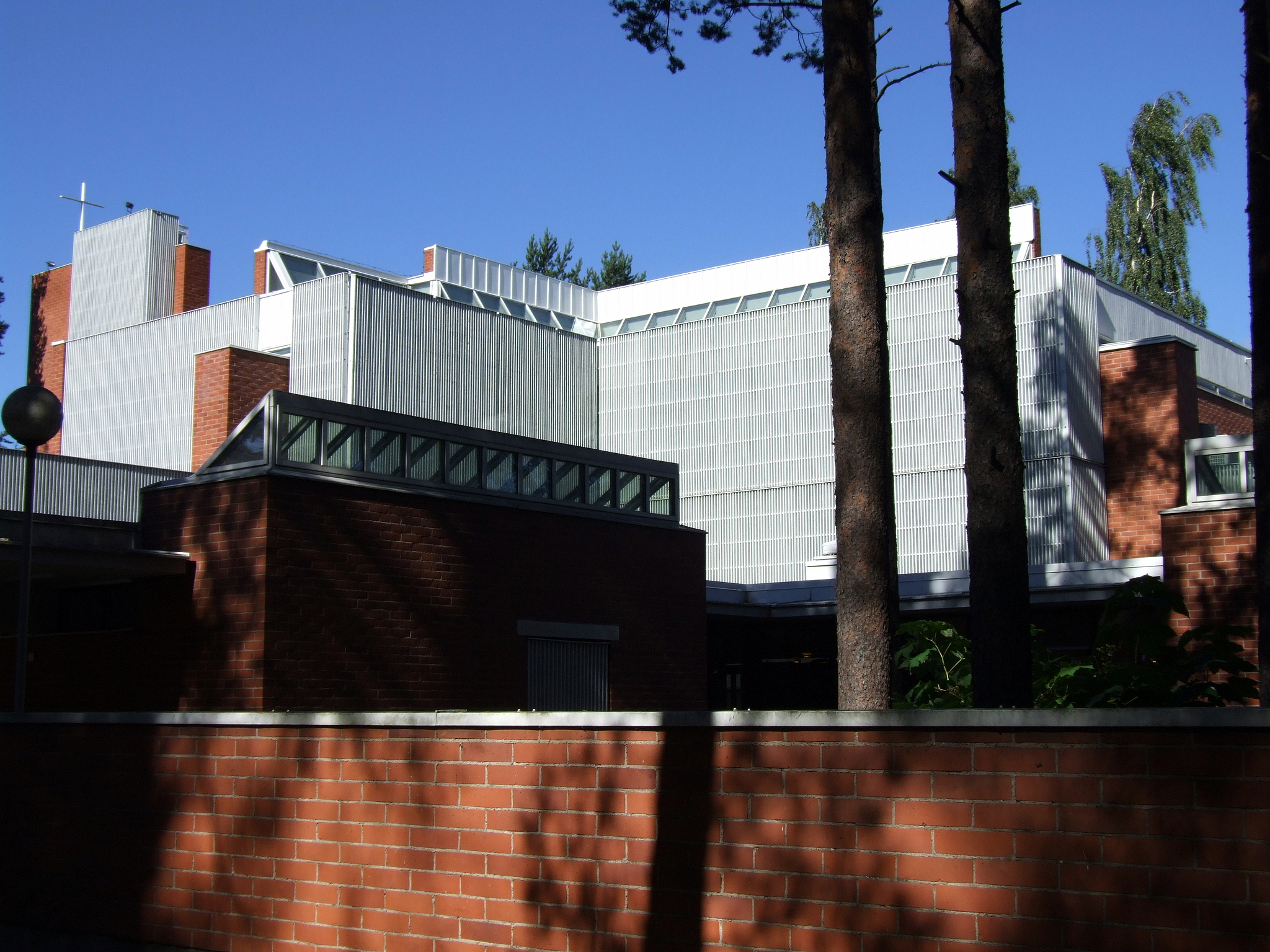
St. Thomas's Church, Oulu, 1975.

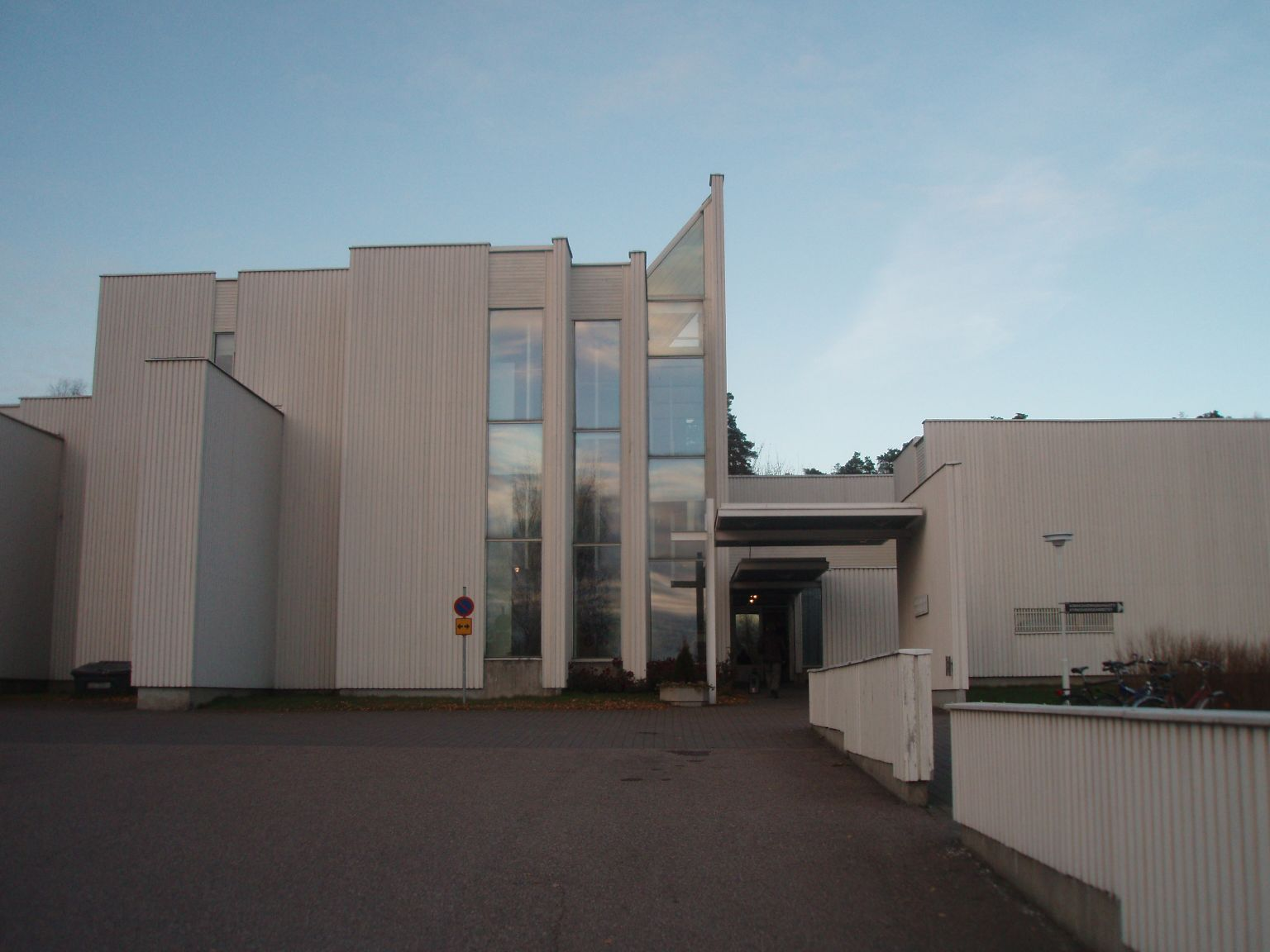
Kirkkonummi Parish Centre, 1984.

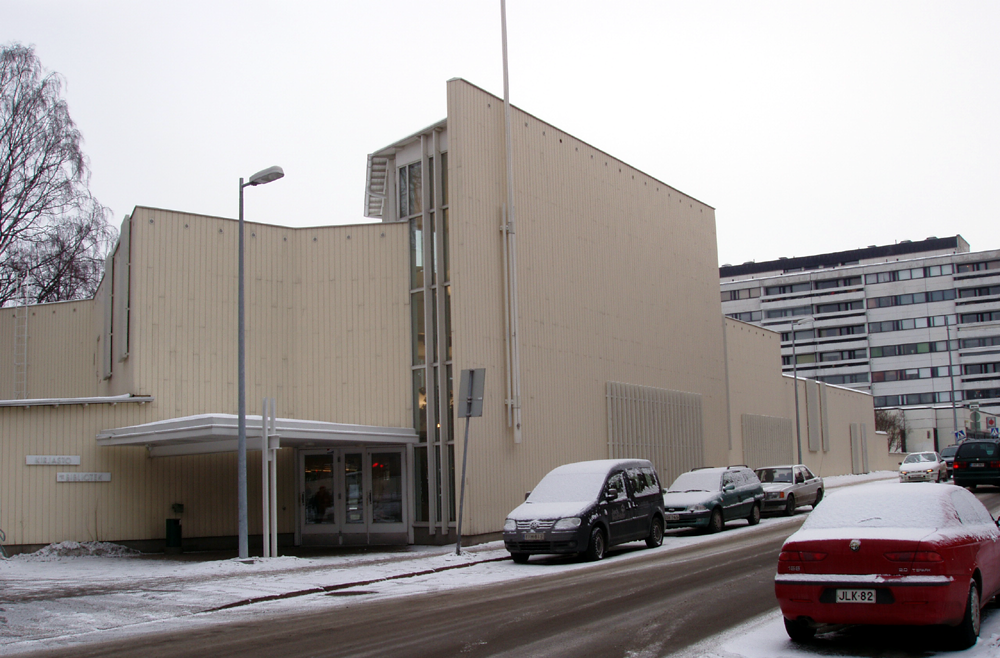
Vallila Library and Daycare Centre, Helsinki, 1991.

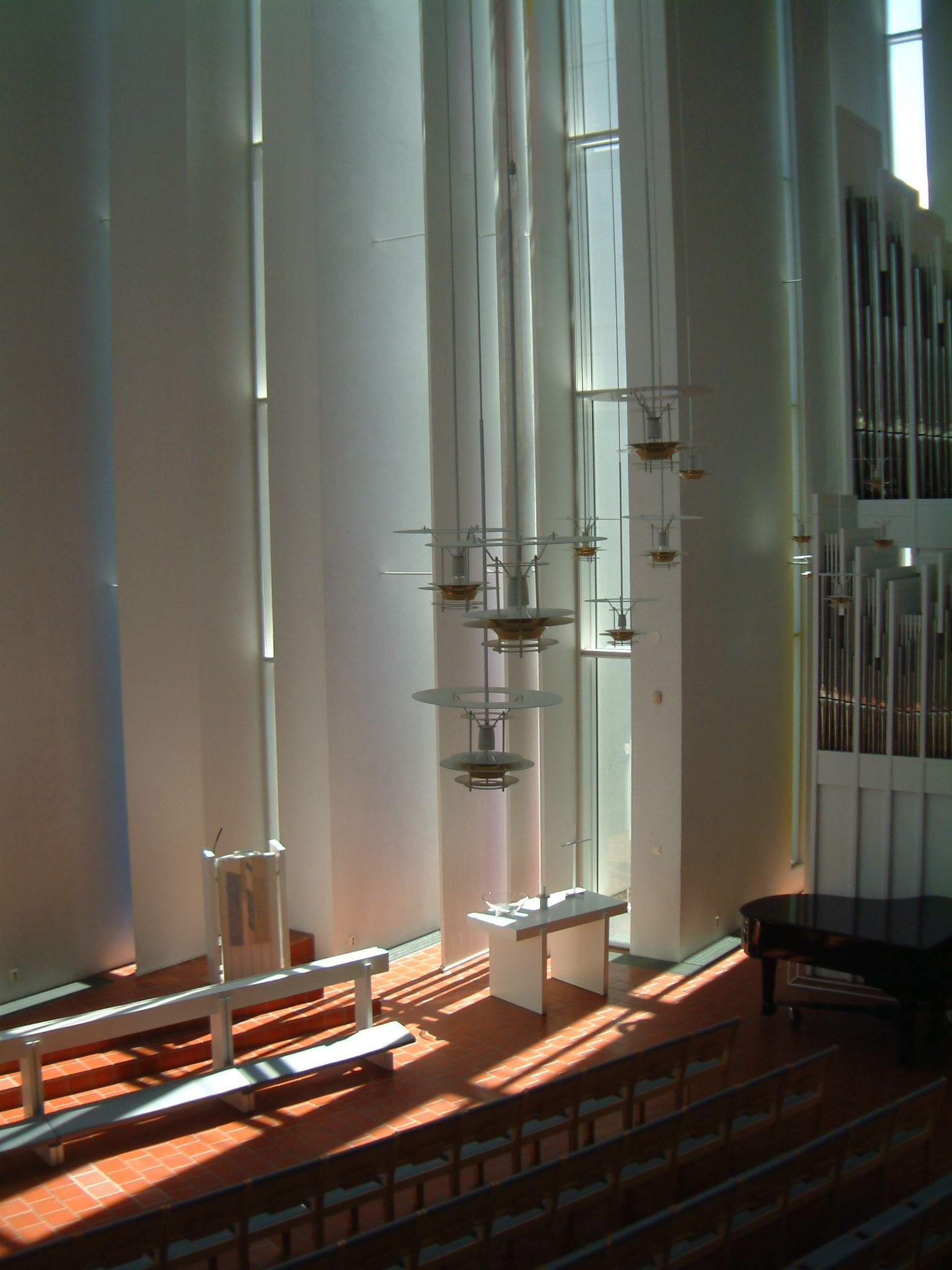
Männistö church, Kuopio, 1992.

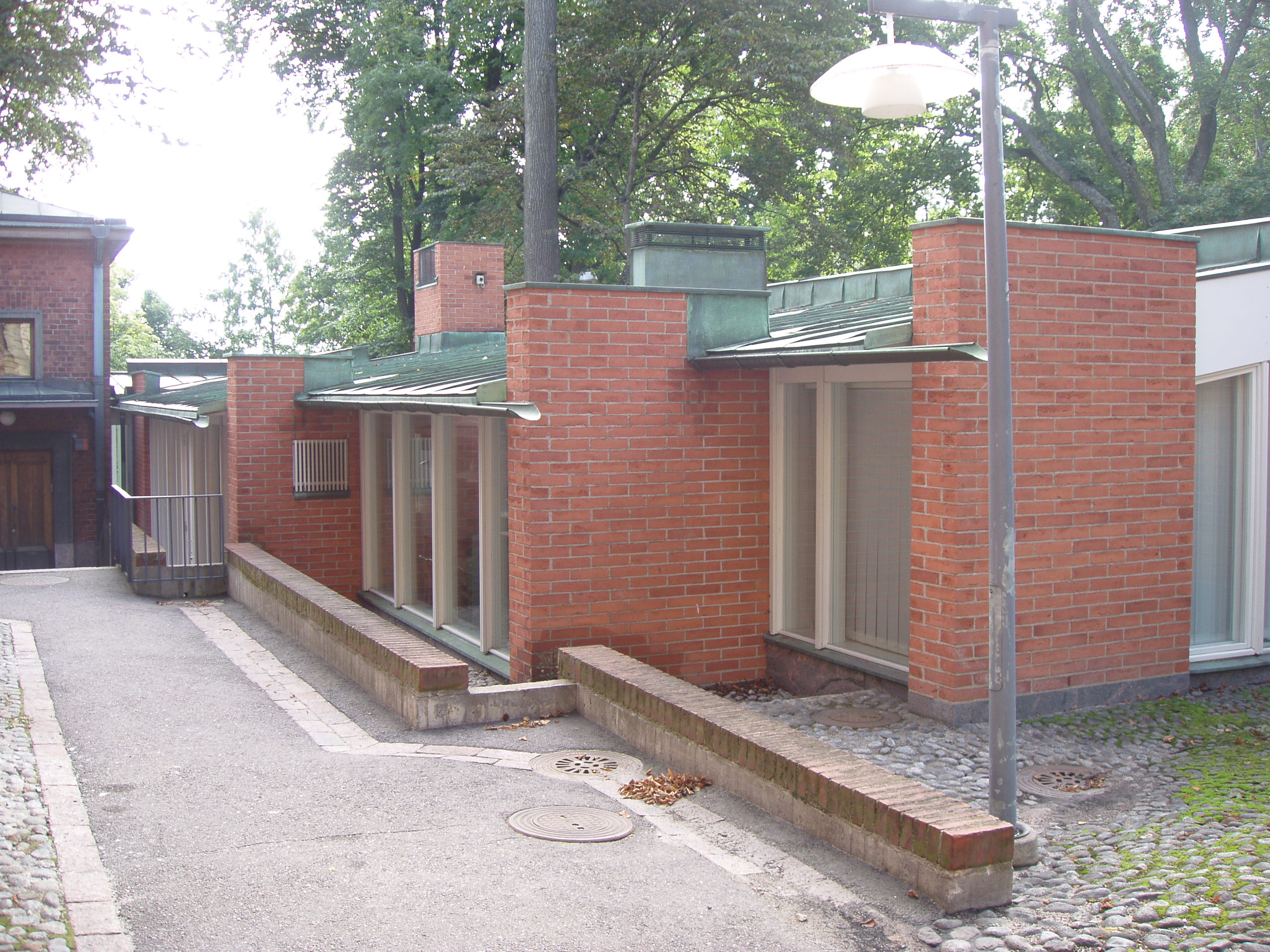
German Church and Parish Centre, Helsinki, 2001.

Good Shepherd Church, Pakila, Helsinki, 2002.

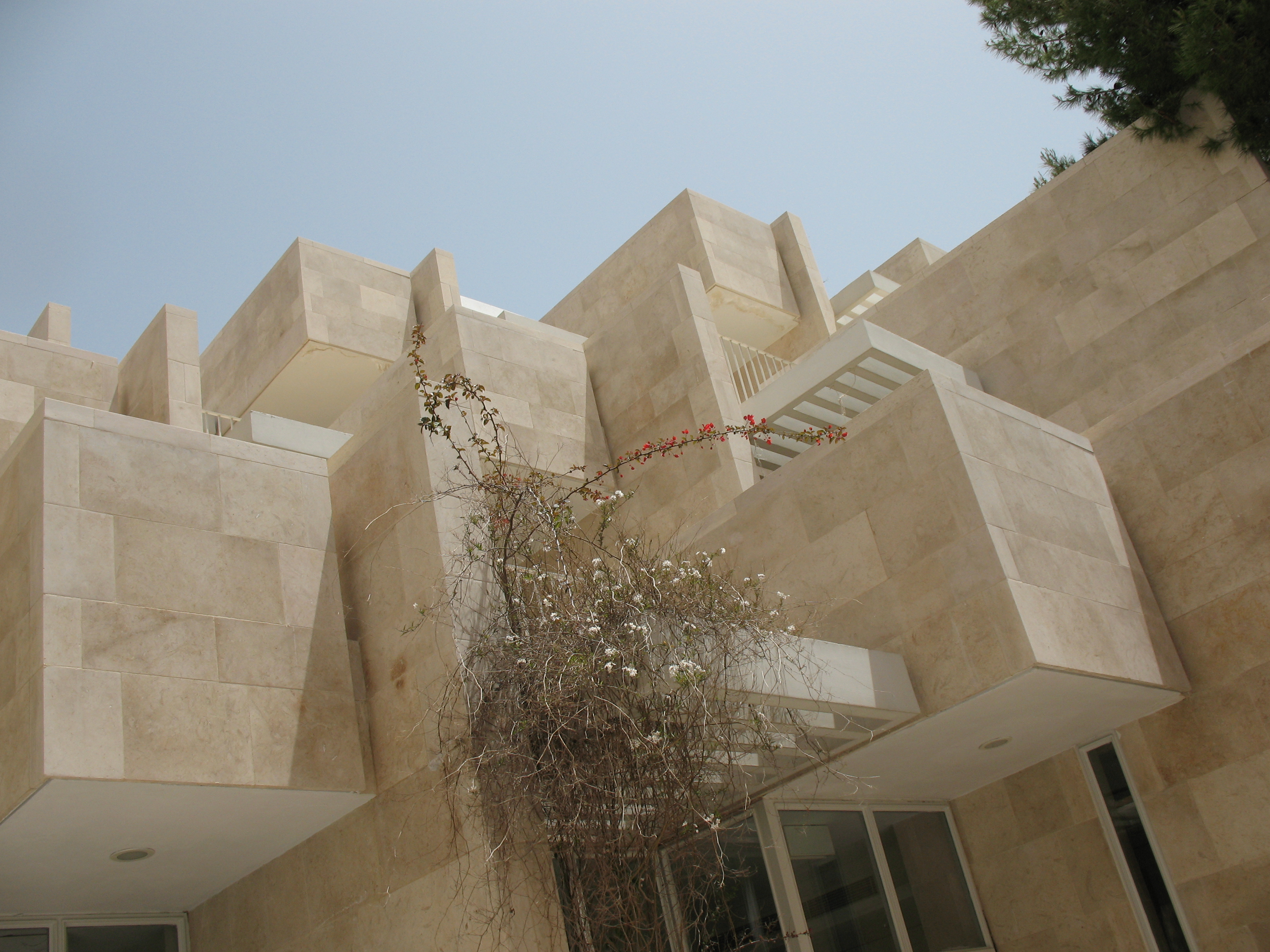
Ad-Dar Cultural Center, Palestine, 2005.

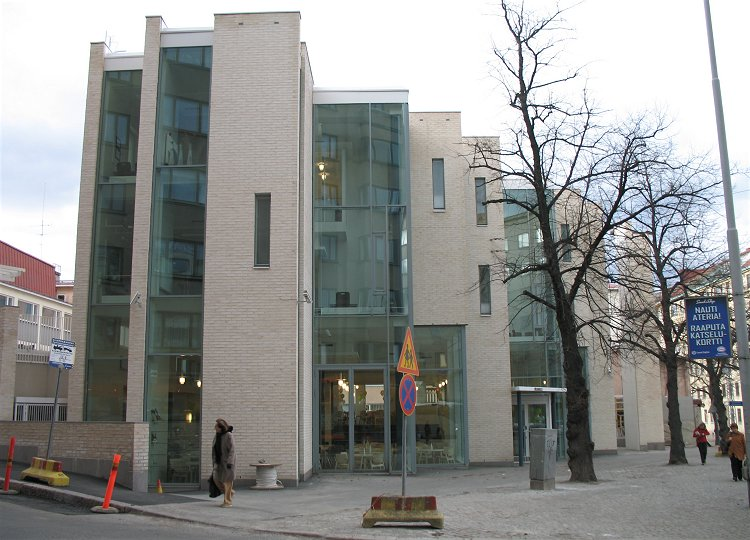
Sandels Cultural Centre, Helsinki, 2007.

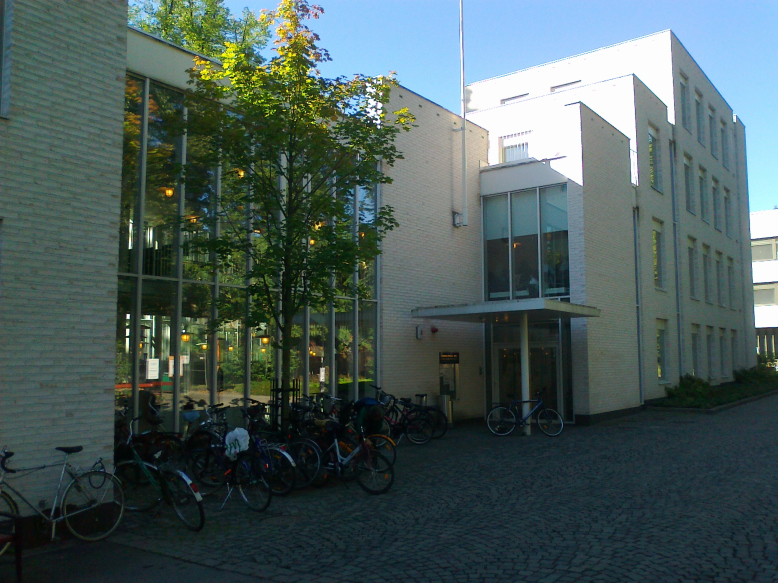
Swedish School of Social Science, Helsinki, 2009.
