= Linnanpelto =

City district of Kuopio, Finland

Coordinates: 62°54′02″N 27°41′27″E

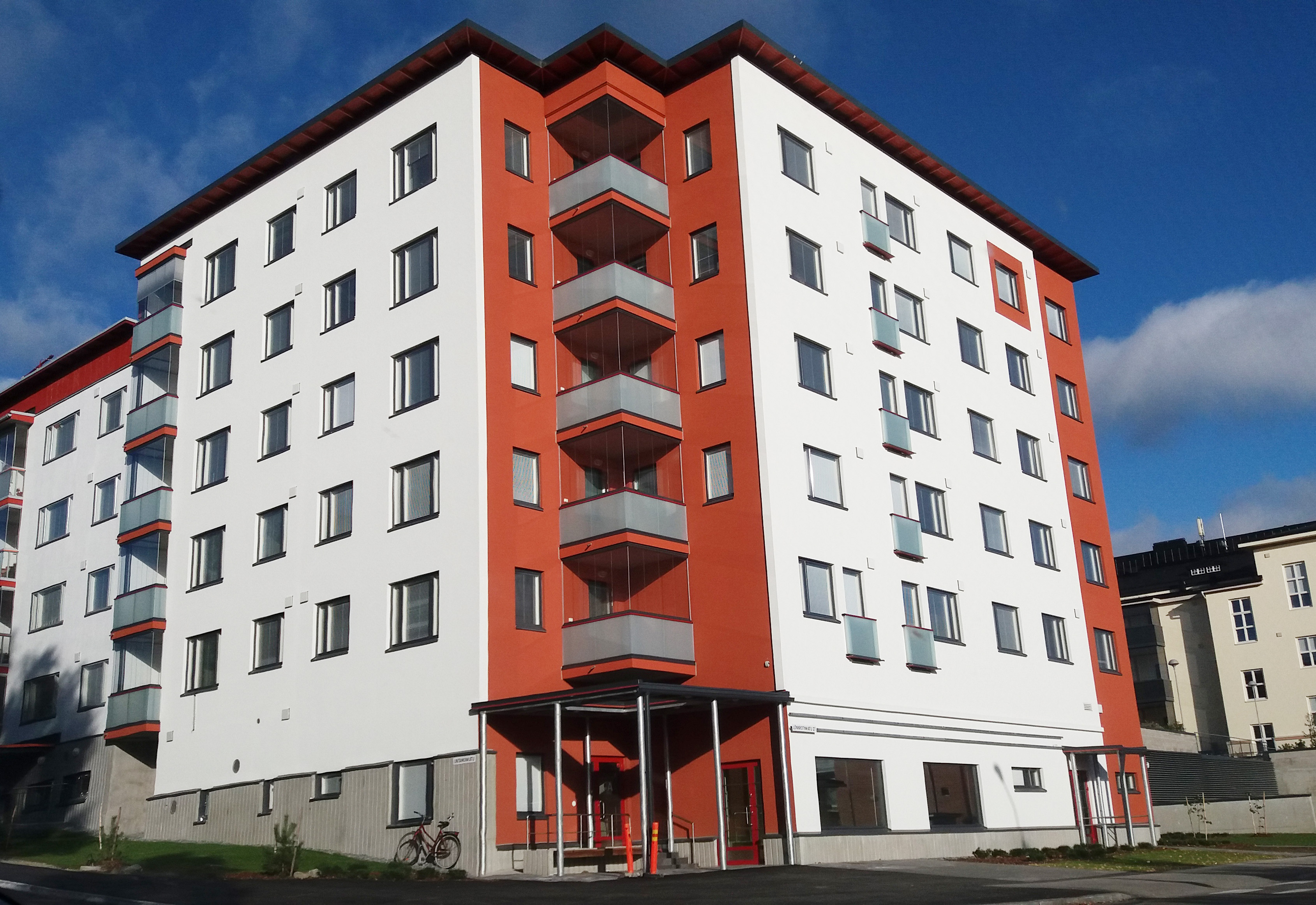
An apartment building on the corner of Lönnrotinkatu and Untamonkatu streets in Linnanpelto

Linnanpelto is a district in the city of Kuopio, Finland, about a kilometer north of the Kuopio Market Square. It is part of the Itkonniemi–Männistö–Linnanpelto division area, which has a population of just over 5,800. Linnanpelto starts immediately on the north side of the railway.

The area has its own services, e.g. Sale grocery store, hairdresser, cafe and kindergarten. The district also houses two schools: the Kalevala School (former Linnanpello Secondary School and High School), which was closed down in summer 2016, and the Pohjanmaa School, about a kilometer away.

The most famous inhabitants of Linnanpelto are the late Pertti "Spede" Pasanen, known for his films and inventions.
