= Myyrmäki Church =

Lutheran church in Myrrmäki, Vantaa, Finland

Myyrmäki Church Myyrmäen kirkko, (in Finnish) Myrbacka kyrka, (in Swedish)
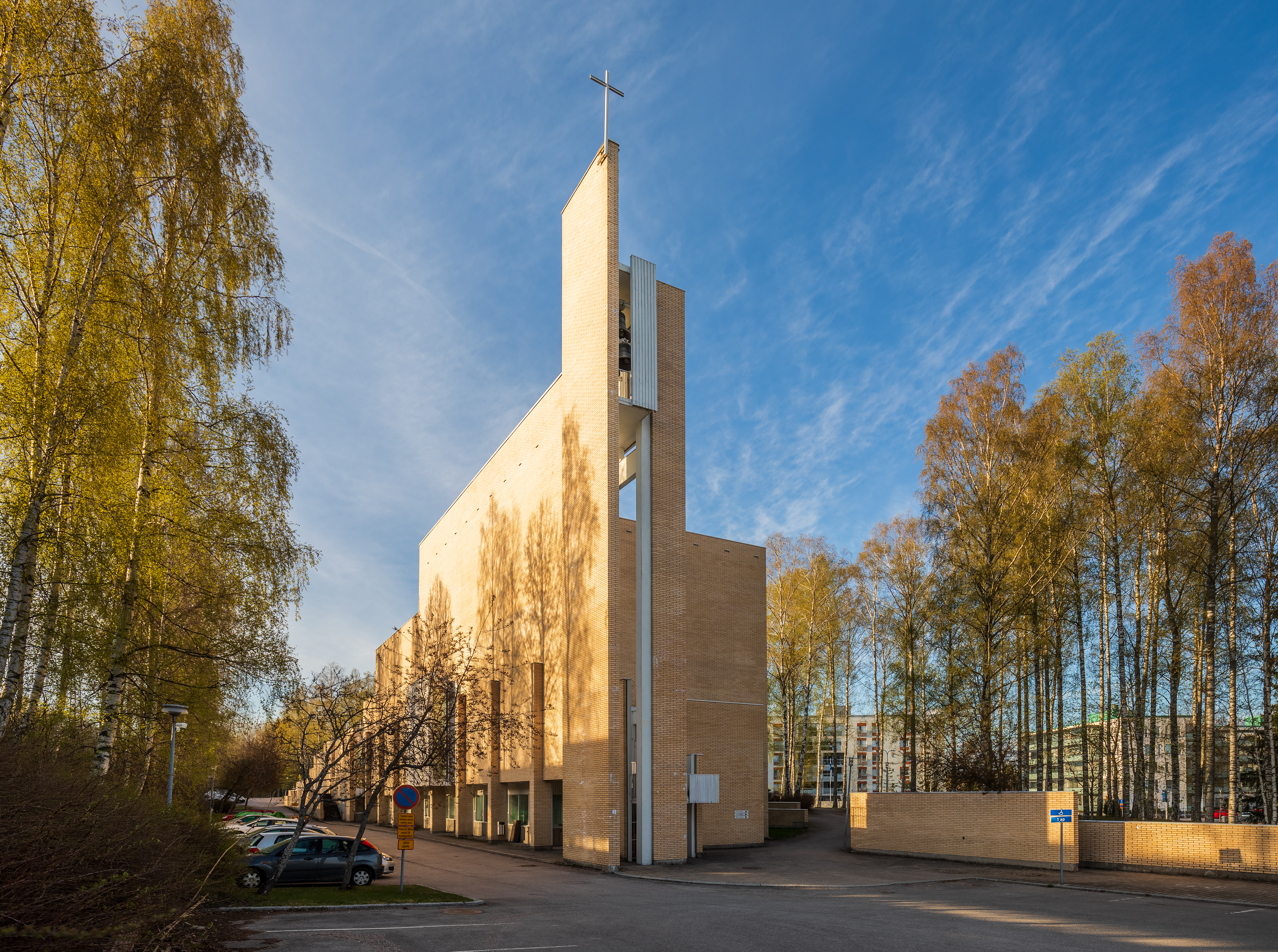
- Myyrmäki Church

Religion
- Affiliation: Evangelical Lutheran Church of Finland
- District: Diocese of Helsinki

Location
- Location: Vantaa, Finland
- Interactive map of Myyrmäki Church; Myyrmäen kirkko, (in Finnish); Myrbacka kyrka, (in Swedish)
- Coordinates: 60°16.28′N 24°51.242′E

Architecture
- Architect: Juha Leiviskä
- Completed: 1984

Specifications
- Capacity: seats 450
- Materials: facade: mainly brick

Website
- www.vantaanseurakunnat.fi

Myyrmäki Church (Finnish: Myyrmäen kirkko, Swedish: Myrbacka kyrka), is a Lutheran church in the Myyrmäki neighborhood in the city of Vantaa. It is located near Louhela commuter train station. The church was designed by architect Juha Leiviskä and it was opened in 1984. It is also known as the Church of Light. In Leiviskä's own words: "To me, a building as such, 'as a piece of architecture', is nothing. Its real significance is revealed in counterpoint with its surroundings, with life and with light."

In addition to the actual sanctuary, the building houses a separate chapel, two meeting halls, the parish offices, and facilities for children's and young people's ministries. The sanctuary seats 450, but with the adjoining meeting halls the capacity is over 700.

Vantaankoski Parish is one of seven Evangelical-Lutheran parishes in Vantaa with a membership of c. 30,000. Myyrmäki Church is the main church of the parish.

The organ of Myyrmäki Church was built by Kangasalan urkurakentamo in 1986. The sound of the organ is mainly Baroque in style.

Leiviskä has stated that when designing the church the ideal he had in mind was the Neresheim Abbey in Bavaria, southern Germany, the late Baroque church designed by architect Balthasar Neumann. The British architecture historian Kenneth Frampton has discussed this aspect of Leiviskä's church architecture, stating: "The Baroque churches of Southern Germany are the conscious inspiration for these (church) works, as Leiviskä openly concedes, even if the syntax could hardly be more removed from the plasticity of Balthasar Neumann. An indirect, hypersensitive play of light on a set of highly susceptible layered lattices and planes is patently the aesthetic modus operandi in these churches. And to this ludic game we must add the equally playful layering of lights miraculously floating at the ends of imperceptible cords..."

== Renovation ==
Myyrmäki Church is closed due to renovations. The church, which has suffered from indoor air problems, has been out of service since 2019. The comprehensive renovation project has begun with meticulous planning. Renovation work on site will begin in the autumn of 2022. The renovation is scheduled for completion in late 2023.

Myyrmäki Church is being thoroughly renovated inside and out. Building services systems and yard structures will also be renewed. The structural solutions of the church have been typical of the time of construction, but today they have been found to be inoperative.

The renovation takes into account the architectural value of the building. The appearance of the church and the church hall remain essentially the same.

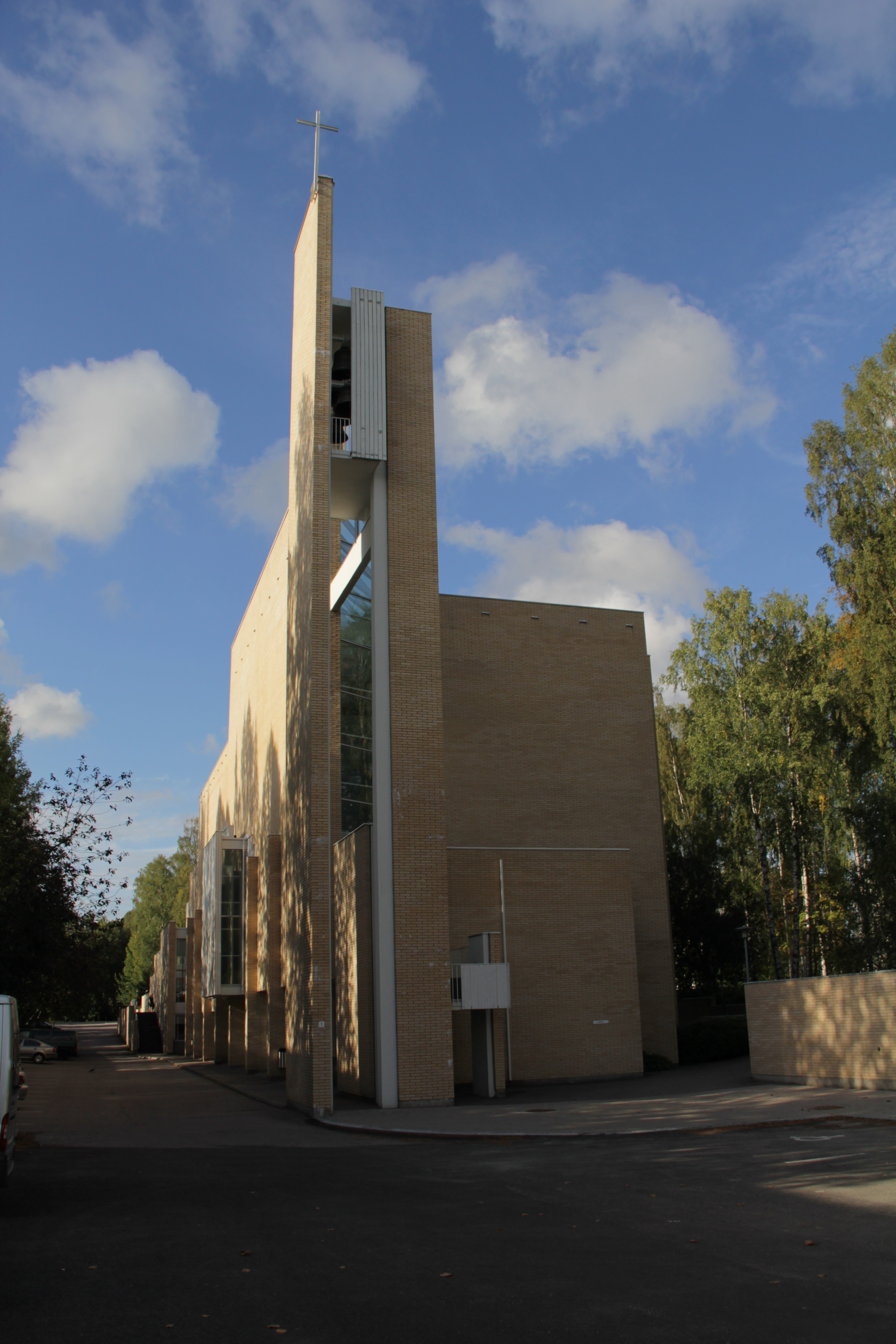
View from south

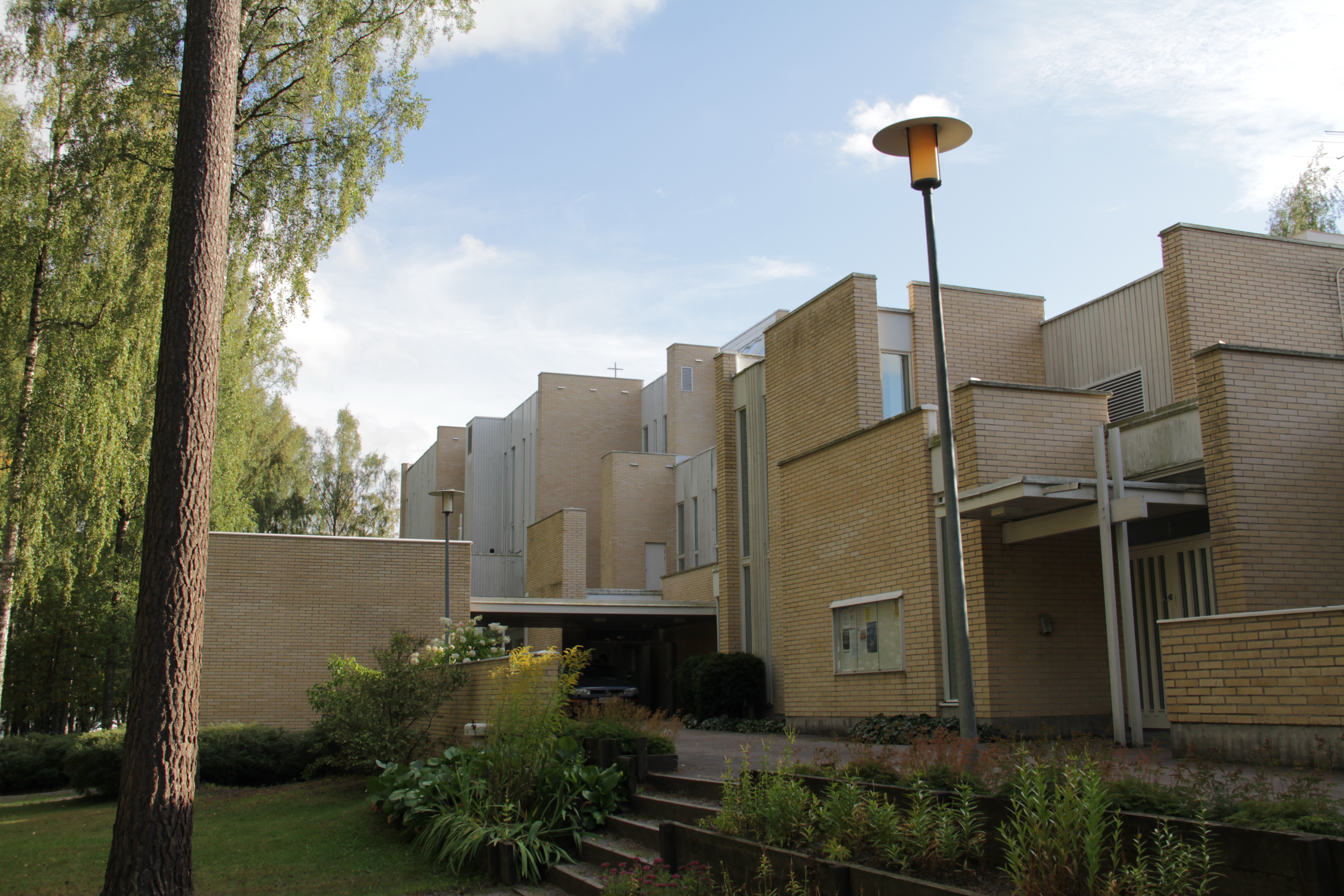
Exterior view from north east

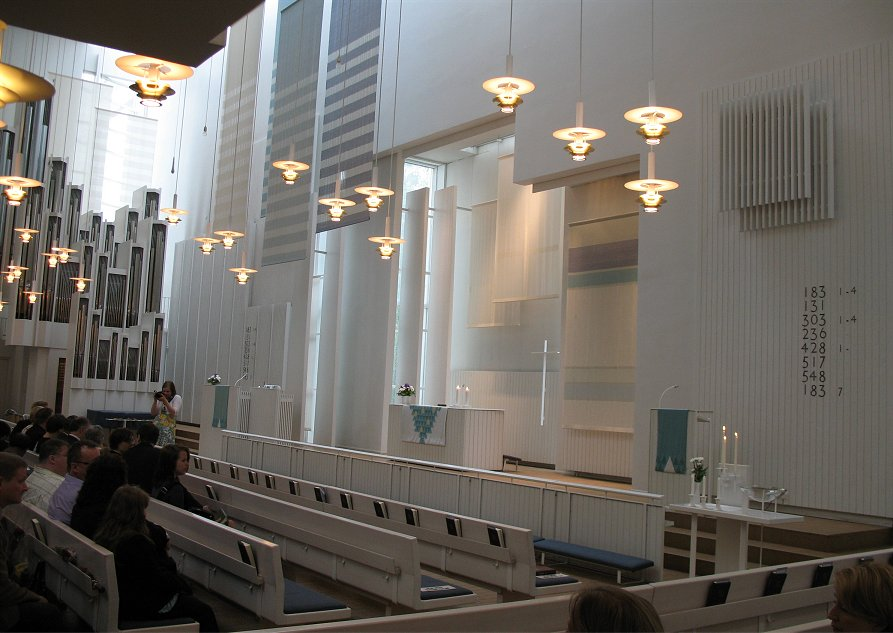
Interior view

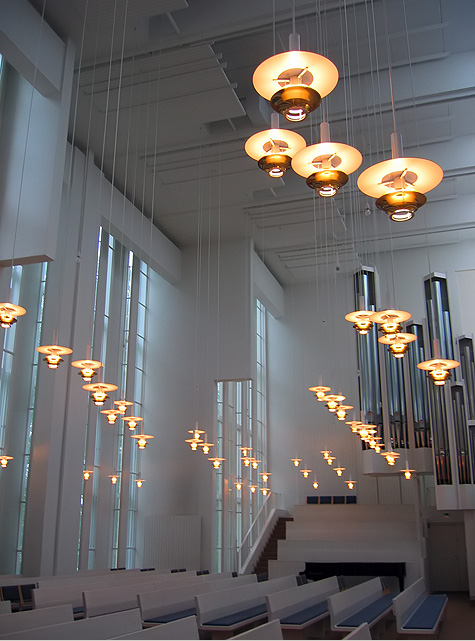
Interior view

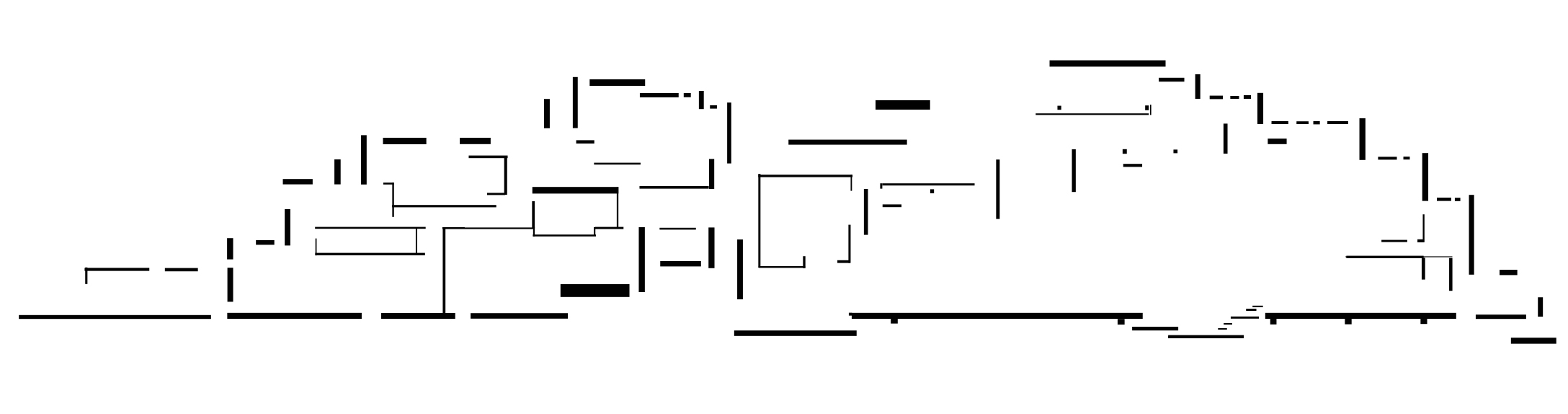
Plan diagram showing "unbounded space"
