= Kouvola Town Hall =

Seat of municipal government in Kouvola, Finland

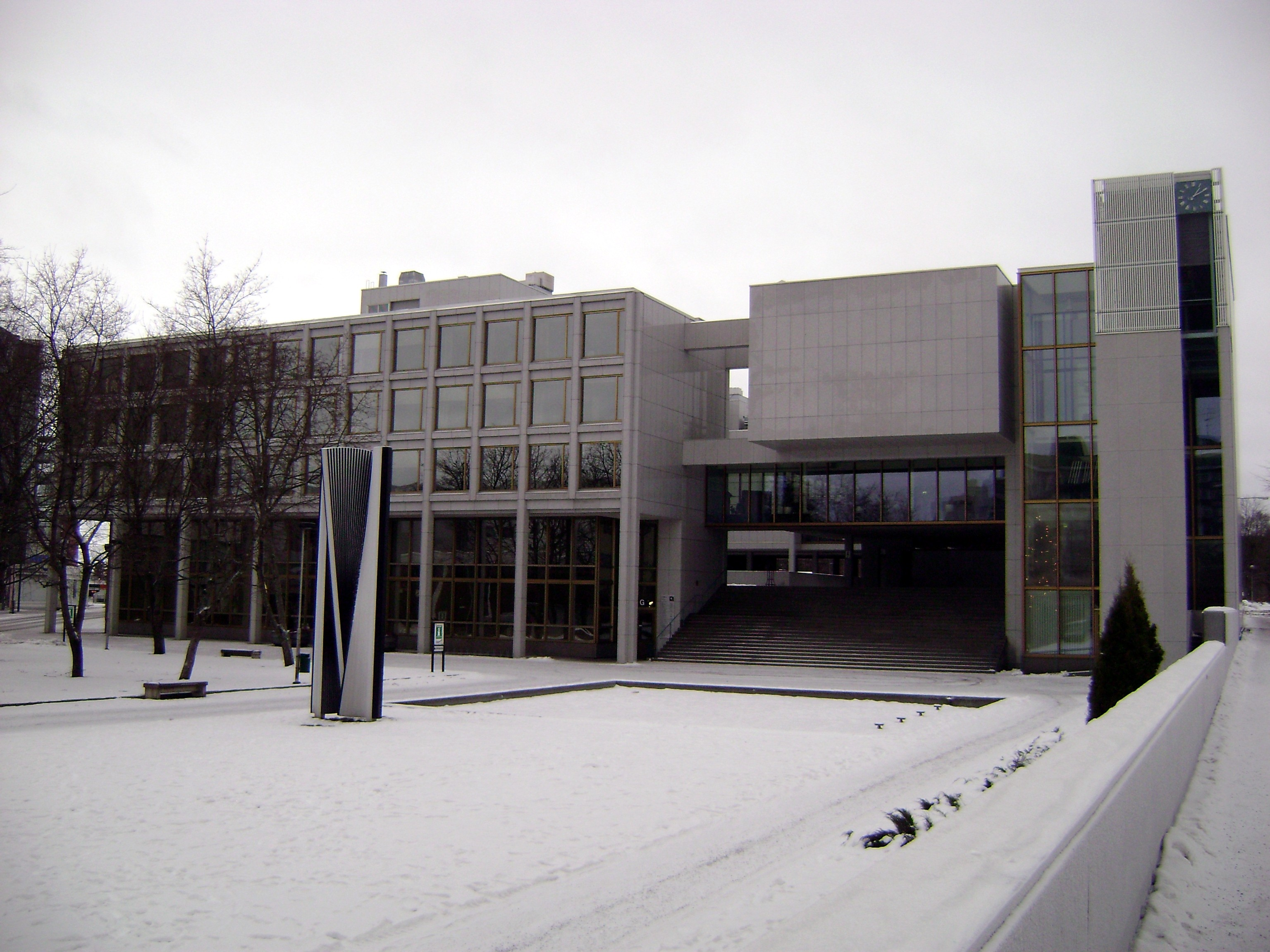
- Kouvola Town Hall
- Interactive map of the Kouvola Town Hall area

General information
- Status: Completed
- Type: Government offices
- Architectural style: Modernist
- Location: Kouvola, Finland, Torikatu 10
- Coordinates: 60.870256°N 26.701733°E
- Construction started: 1964
- Completed: 1968
- Owner: City of Kouvola

Design and construction
- Architects: Juha Leiviskä; Bertel Saarnio

Kouvola Town hall (Finnish: Kouvolan kaupungintalo) is the seat of municipal government of City of Kouvola, Finland. The building was designed by architect Juha Leiviskä together with Bertel Saarnio, and completed in 1968. It is considered to be the breakthrough work of Juha Leiviskä. DOCOMOMO Finland working party has included Kouvola Town Hall on its list of important architectural and environmental sites. In 2017 Kouvola Town Hall was voted by Iltalehti readers as the most handsome city hall in Finland.

Main hall of Kouvola town hall is one of the two home concert halls of Kymi Sinfonietta.
