= Vallila Library =

Coordinates: 60.1922°N 24.9624°E

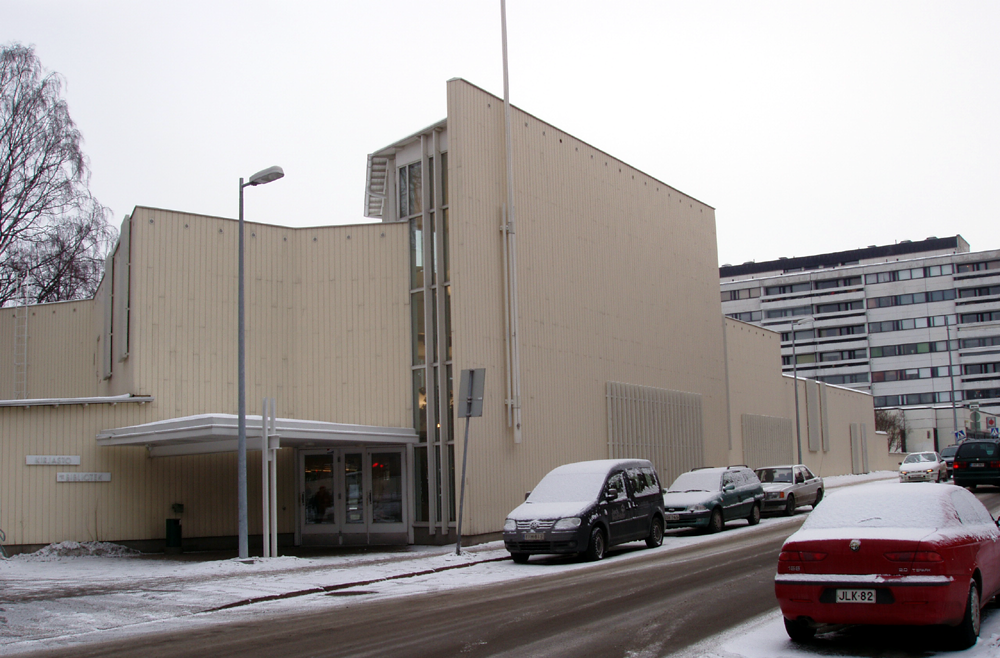
The current building of the Vallila Library was built in 1991 and designed by the architects Juha Leiviskä and Asta Björklund.

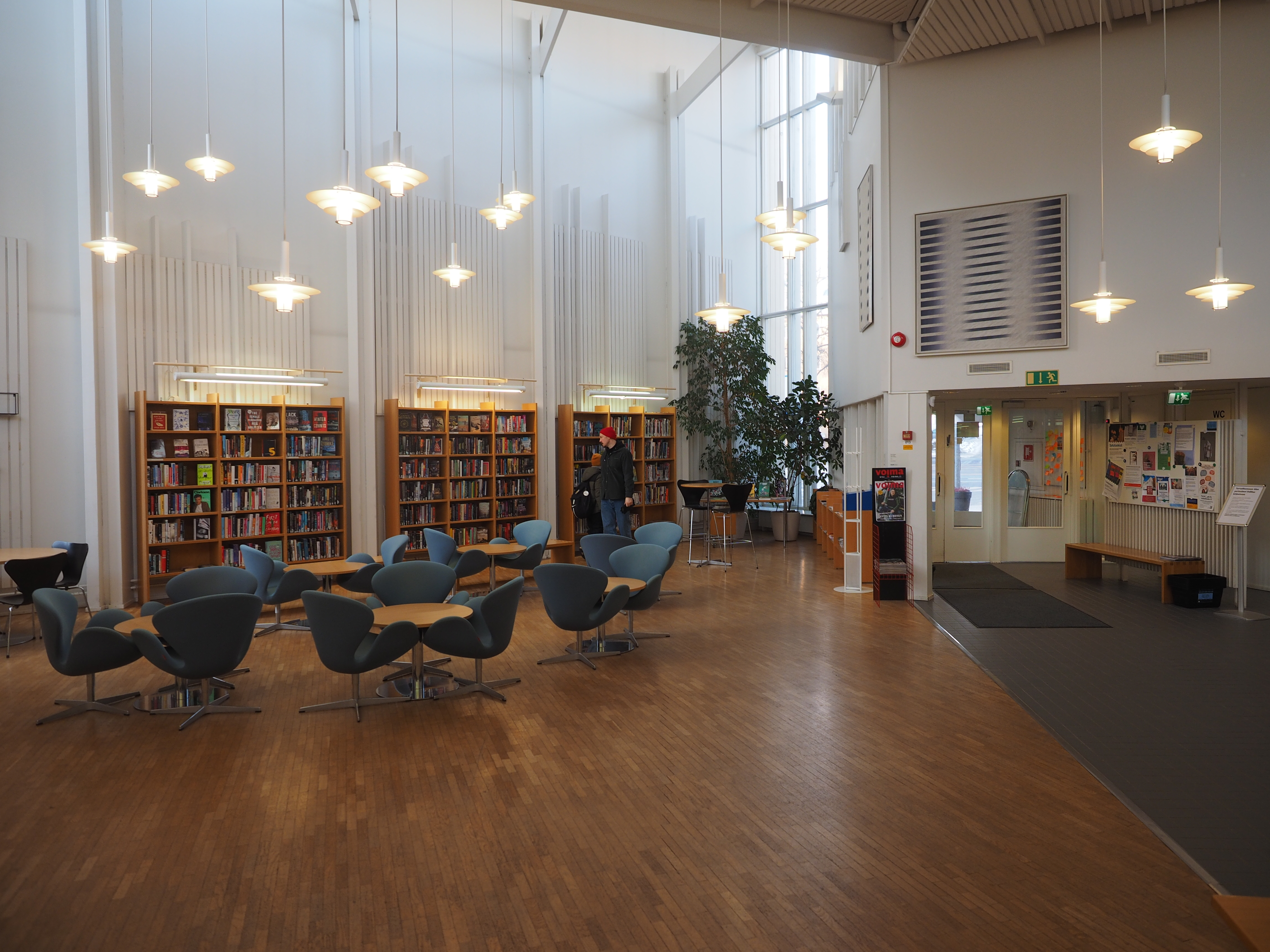
Interior of the library.

The Vallila Library is a branch of the Helsinki City Library founded in 1908, located in Vallila, Helsinki, Finland. The library is located in a building at Päijänteentie 5, designed by Juha Leiviskä and Asta Björklund. The building is a popular cultural sight.

The Vallila Library includes the exhibition space Galleria Kajava, which holds monthly exhibitions.

== History ==
The Vallila Library started operating at Itäinen Viertotie 39 (now known as Hämeentie 101) in 1908. The decision to found the library had already been made ten years before. The original name for the library was the Hermanni Branch Library. The premises included five rented rooms, of which two served as reserves for books, one as a loaning office and two as reading rooms. The library was open for all days of the year except for Christmas Eve and Christmas Day. The Hermanni Branch Library continued operations in its original premises until 1927, when the increase in population and lack of space forced the library board to search for new premises for the library.

The new premises for the library were found at the building AsOy Sture on the street Sammatintie, built in the previous year. Premises with an area 250 square metre had been set aside for the library on the ground floor of the building already during its construction. The city of Helsinki still owns these premises. The name of the library was changed to the Vallila Branch Library.

In the bombings in February 1944 the building at Sammatintie 2-4 was hit and caught fire. Even though the fire did not reach the interior of the library, the water from the extinguishing work reached the books and as it froze, it destroyed a large part of the library's collection. The surviving parts were moved to safety at the Käpylä Library. During the repairs of the damage by the bombings, the library interior was changed to more open, but the constant lack of space still had a negative effect on the library's operations even though the magazine room was moved to the street Kangasalantie. New premises for the library had already been planned at various places already since the late 1930s but a decision to build new premises was only made in the 1980s.

The current premises of the Vallila Library were inaugurated in 1991. The building, designed by architects Juha Leiviskä and Asta Björklund, hosts a kindergarten in addition to the library. The interior of the library was designed by Jatta Olin. The new building became immediately popular among the inhabitants of Vallila. The library was repaired and renewed in 2008. The inner yard was restored to its original state in 2010. The building underwent a complete renovation in 2013.

== Sources ==
=== Bibliography ===
- Kianto, Marjut et al.: Hermannin haaraosastosta Vallilan kirjastoksi 1908-1998: Vallilan kirjasto 90 vuotta. City of Helsinki 2000.
