= Louis Poulsen =

Danish lighting design and manufacturing company founded in 1874

Louis Poulsen Lighting A/S
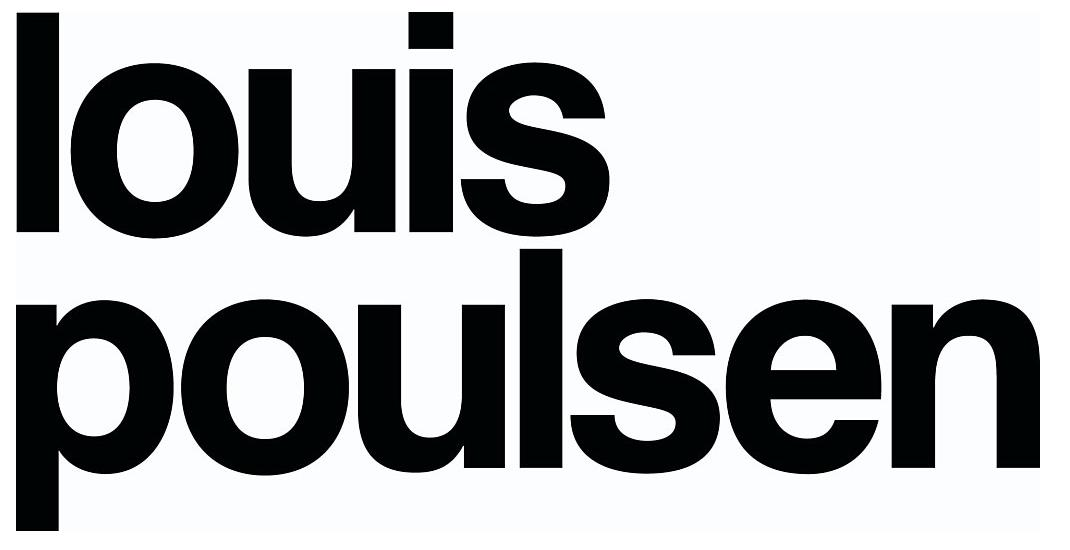
- Type: Privately held
- Industry: Design
- Founded: 1874
- Founder: Louis Poulsen
- Headquarters: Gammel Strand 28, DK-1202, Copenhagen, Denmark
- Number of locations: Worldwide Showrooms
- Area served: Worldwide
- Products: Luxury lighting
- Number of employees: approx. 300
- Website: http://www.louispoulsen.com

Louis Poulsen is a Danish lighting manufacturer that was founded in 1874. Louis Poulsen Lighting is represented by subsidiaries, distribution offices and agents around the world. Their key sales regions are Scandinavia, Europe, Japan and United States. Some of Louis Poulsen's designers were Arne Jacobsen and Poul Henningsen. Some of their signature products are the PH-Lamps.

== History ==
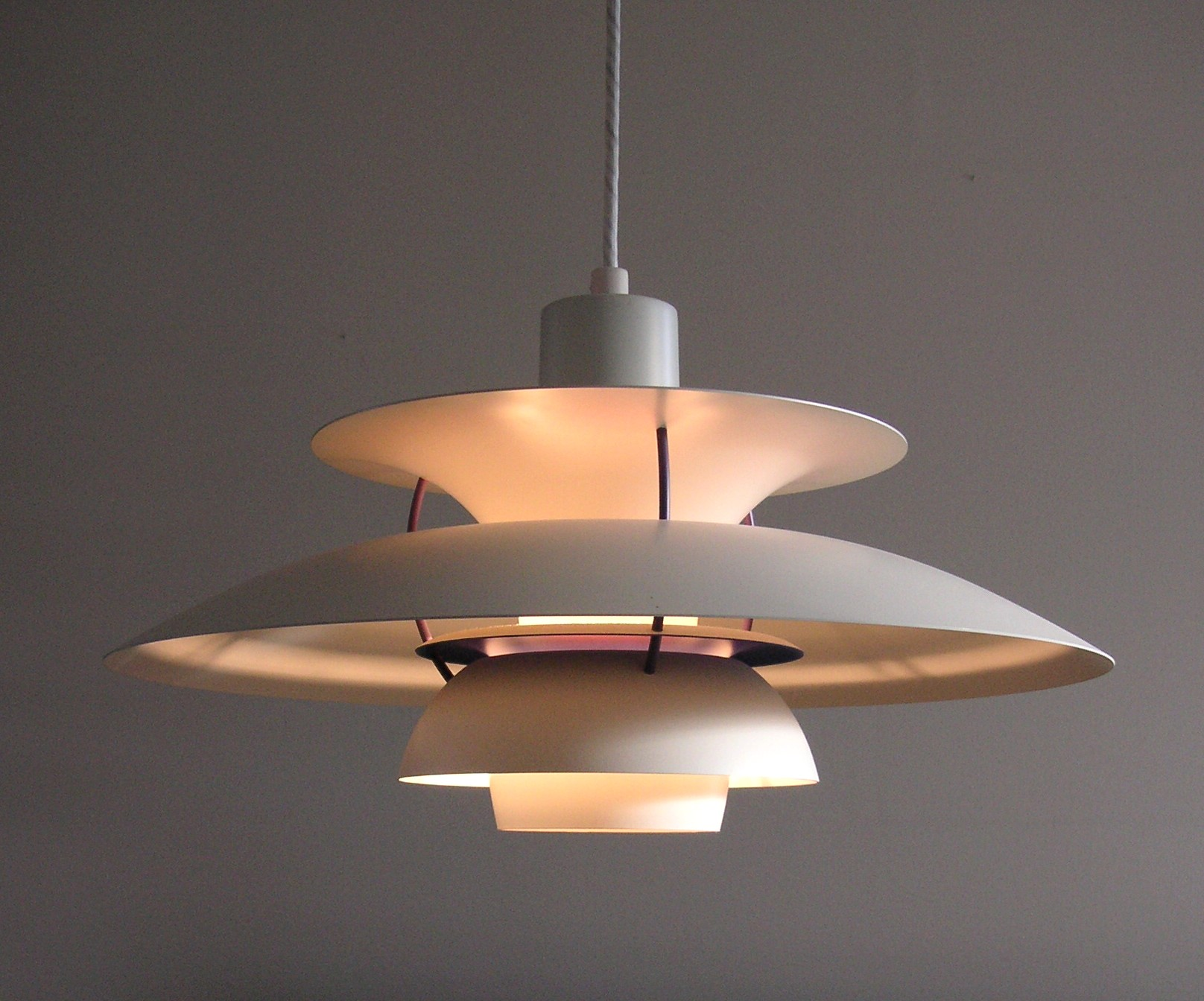
Poul Henningsen's PH-5 lamp.

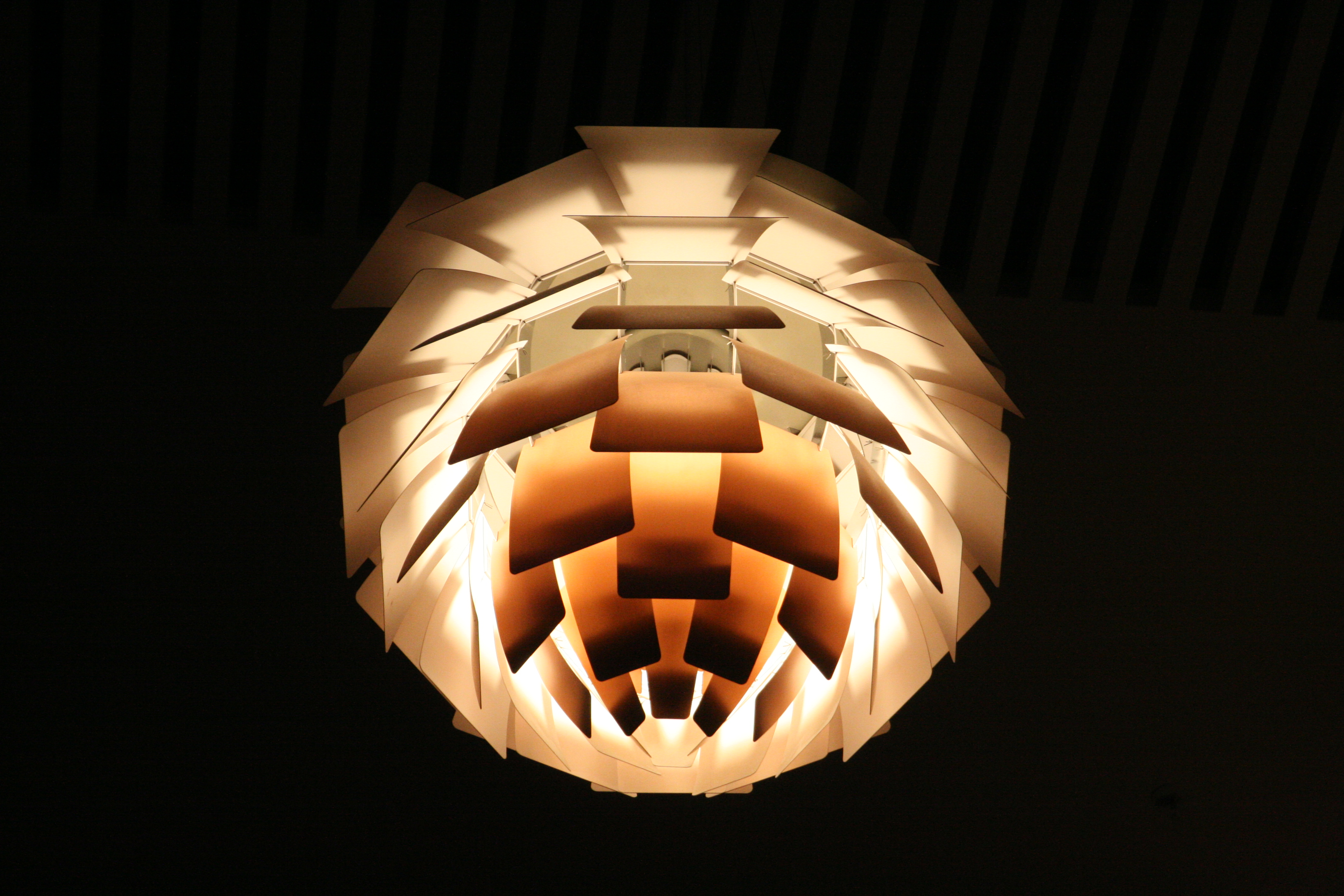
Poul Henningsen's iconic "Artichoke" lamp.

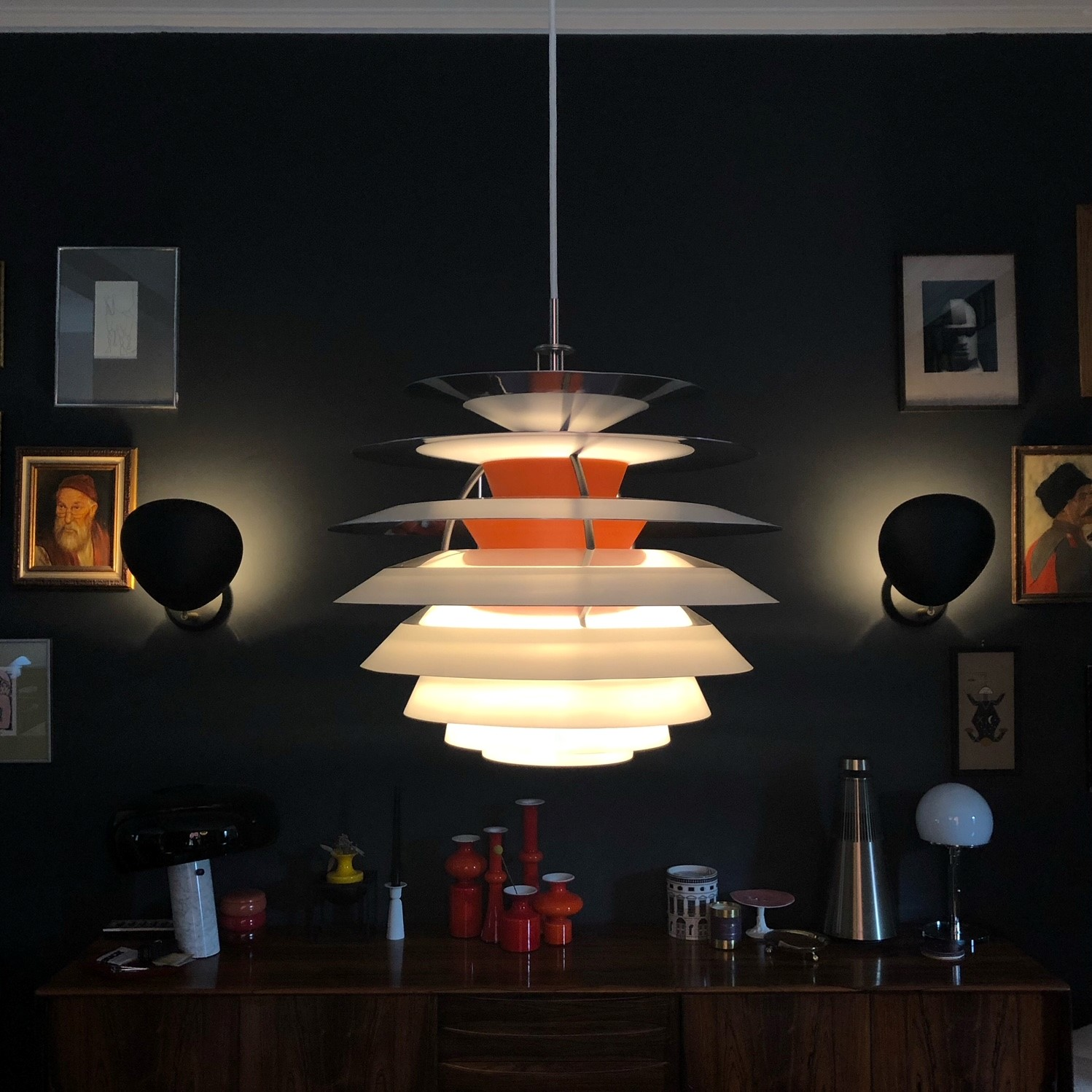
Louis Poulsen PH Kontrast
