= International Uuno Klami Composition Competition =

The International Uuno Klami Composition Competition is a composition competition. It has been held once in five years since 2004 and it has been named after the Finnish composer Uuno Klami. It is being organized by Kansainvälisen Uuno Klami –sävellyskilpailun kannatusyhdistys ry, which consists of Kymi Sinfonietta and the cities of Kotka and Kouvola, Finland. Kymi Sinfonietta also plays the works in the finals. The main goal of the competition is to bring forward the life work of Uuno Klami and to help improve his international recognition. Moreover, the mission of the competition is to produce new repertoire for sinfonietta-sized orchestras.

The amount of the participating works has been greatly increased in every competition.

There is no age limit in the Uuno Klami Composition Competition. The participation is limited to certain European countries: Nordic countries, EU Member States and Albania, Andorra, Belarus, Bosnia-Herzegovina, Croatia, Kosovo, Liechtenstein, Macedonia, Moldavia, Monaco, Montenegro, Russia, San Marino, Serbia, Switzerland, Ukraine or the Vatican City State. The competition is broadcast Europe-wide.

== I International Uuno Klami Composition Competition ==
117 compositions from 23 different countries participated to the I International Uuno Klami Composition Competition. The finals concerts were held 17.9.2004 in Kouvola and 18.9.2004 in Kotka. The jury consisted of composer Kalevi Aho (chairman of the jury), composer Kaija Saariaho, composer Magnus Lindberg and Juha Nikkola, the conductor for the Kymi Sinfonietta. Five works were played in the finals.

The results were the following:

- I Prize: Giovanni Bonato, Italy: Arcanae Obices
- Shared II Prize: Harri Ahmas, Finland: Symphony no. 2 and Barnaby Hollington, United Kingdom: A Certain Chinese Encyclopaedia
- Shared III Prize: Kevin Mayo, United Kingdom: Sirens and Peter Seabourne, United Kingdom: Piano Concerto

The audience at the finals concerts voted that the audience prize be given to Harri Ahmas for his Symphony no. 2. Ahmas was also the winner of the prize awarded by the Municipality of Virolahti. The members of the Society of Finnish Composers convening in Kotka on 18 September 2004 voted Giovanni Bonato's Arcanae Obices as their favourite work.

== II International Uuno Klami Composition Competition ==
The II International Uuno Klami Composition Competition finals concerts were held 18.9.2009 in Kouvola and 19.9.2009 in Kotka. 186 works from 27 countries participated in the competition. The chairman of the jury was composer Kalevi Aho and the other jury members were composer Magnus Lindberg, composer Anders Eliasson and Yasuo Shinozaki, the conductor for Kymi Sinfonietta. Four works were played in the finals.

The prizes were awarded as follows:

- I Prize: Joachim F.W. Schneider (Germany): Drei Orchesterstücke
- Shared II Prize: Kent Olofsson (Sweden): Stalingrad Madonna (Symphonie II) and Oliver Waespi (Switzerland): Double Concerto for Guitar and Flute
- III Prize: Victor Alcántara (Germany): Toccata Concertante
- The prize of the City of Kotka went to Joachim F.W. Schneider: Drei Orchesterstücke
- The prize of the City of Kouvola was shared by Kent Olofsson: Stalingrad Madonna (Symphonie II) and Oliver Waespi: Double Concerto for Guitar and Flute.
- The finals audience prize, the prize of the Municipality of Virolahti went to Victor Alcántara for Toccata Concertante.

== III International Uuno Klami Composition Competition ==
265 works from 32 countries entered the III International Uuno Klami Composition Competition. The Finals Concerts has been held 13.11.2014 in Kouvola city hall and 14.11.2014 in Kotka concert hall. The jury consisted of composer Kalevi Aho (chairman of the jury), composer Magnus Lindberg, composer Erkki-Sven Tüür and conductor Yasuo Shinozaki. Five works were played in the finals.

The prize winners are:

- I Prize € 11 000: Luca Vago (Italy): Suite de los espejos
- II Prize € 9 000: Axel Ruoff (Germany): Sinfonietta
- III Prize € 7 000: Sauli Zinovjev (Finland): Gryf
- The prize of the City of Kotka worth €3 000 went to Alexander Muno (Germany) for Martialis Epigrammata
- The prize of the City of Kouvola worth €2 000 went to Teodor Nicolau (Finland/Romania) for Mioritic roots
- The finals audience prize, the prize of the municipality of Virolahti worth € 500 went to Teodor Nicolau (Finland/Romania) for Mioritic roots

== IV International Uuno Klami Composition Competition ==
The International Uuno Klami Composition Competition is being held for the fourth time in 2018–2019. The competition was announced in January 2018. The competition is open to citizens of any EU Member State, of a Nordic country, or of a closely associated country. The Jury consists of Finland's Kalevi Aho and Magnus Lindberg and Estonia's Erkki-Sven Tüür, three of the greatest composers and most influential musical figures of their generation. The conductor member of the Jury is Olari Elts (Estonia). The Jury will select at least three but not more than five of the anonymous entries for the finals. These will be performed at concerts in Kouvola and Kotka in the autumn season 2019 by the Kymi Sinfonietta.

== V International Uuno Klami Composition Competition ==
The fifth International Uuno Klami Composition Competition took place over 2023 and 2024, attracting many entries; almost 230 compositions were received. From these, works were shortlisted for the finals and performed by the Kymi Sinfonietta at two finals concerts, held on 14 November 2024 in Kouvola and on 15 November 2024 in Kotka (Finland).

== Next competition ==
The next International Uuno Klami Composition Competition is scheduled for 2028–2029.
