= PH-lamp =

Danish light fixtures

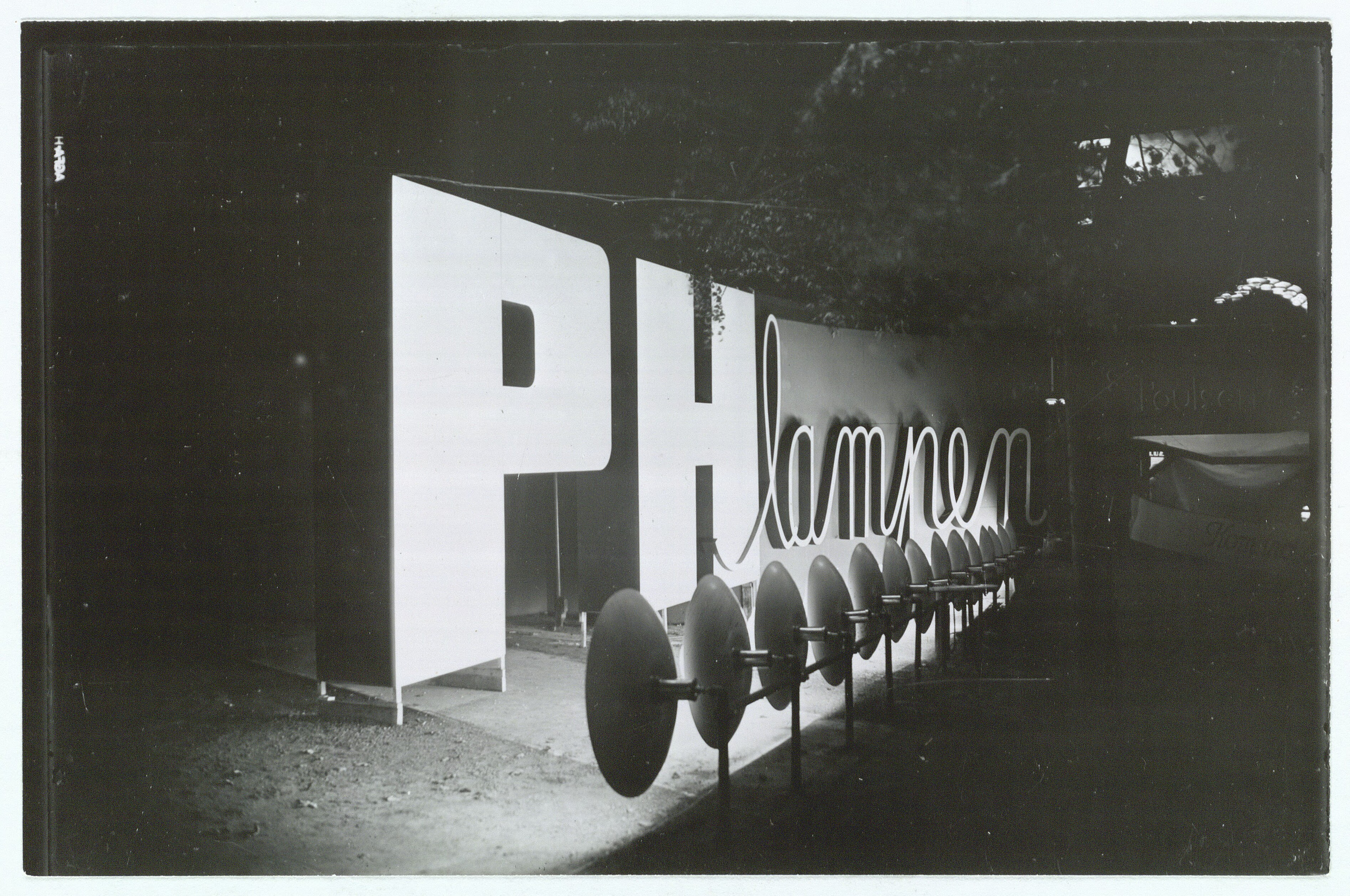
Illuminated sign for PH Lampen (Louis Poulsen brand name for Henningsen lamps)

The PH-lamp is a term for light fixtures designed by Danish designer and writer Poul Henningsen. The term is sometimes used to refer to any lamp designed by Henningsen, or specially Henningsen's three-shade lamp series. The lamps are produced by Louis Poulsen.

Henningsen's lamps are designed with multiple concentric shades to eliminate visual glare, only emitting reflected light, obscuring the light source. Henningsen's sleek, spare lamp was first presented at the 1925 International Exhibition of Modern Decorative and Industrial Arts where it was awarded a gold medal.

== Gallery ==
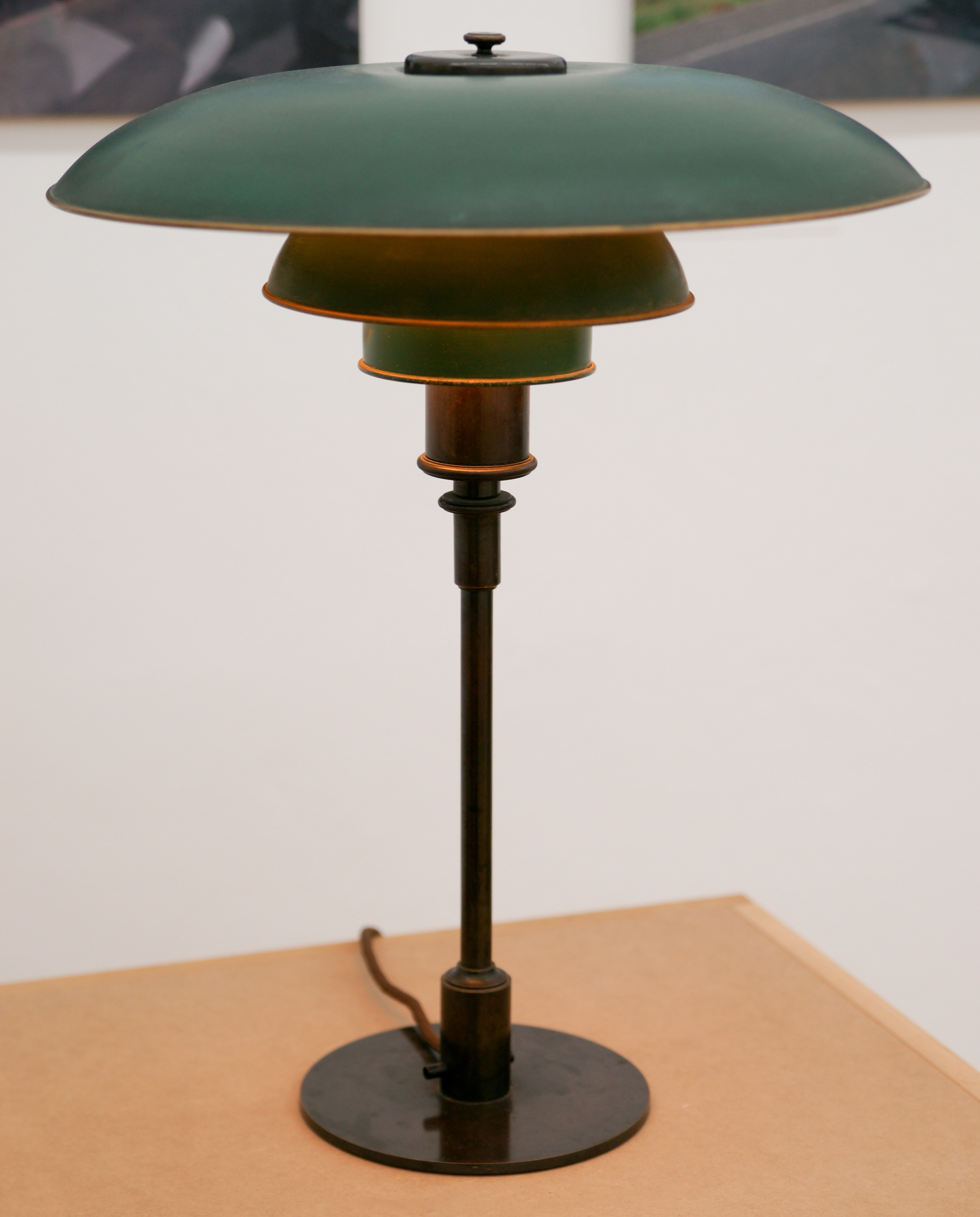

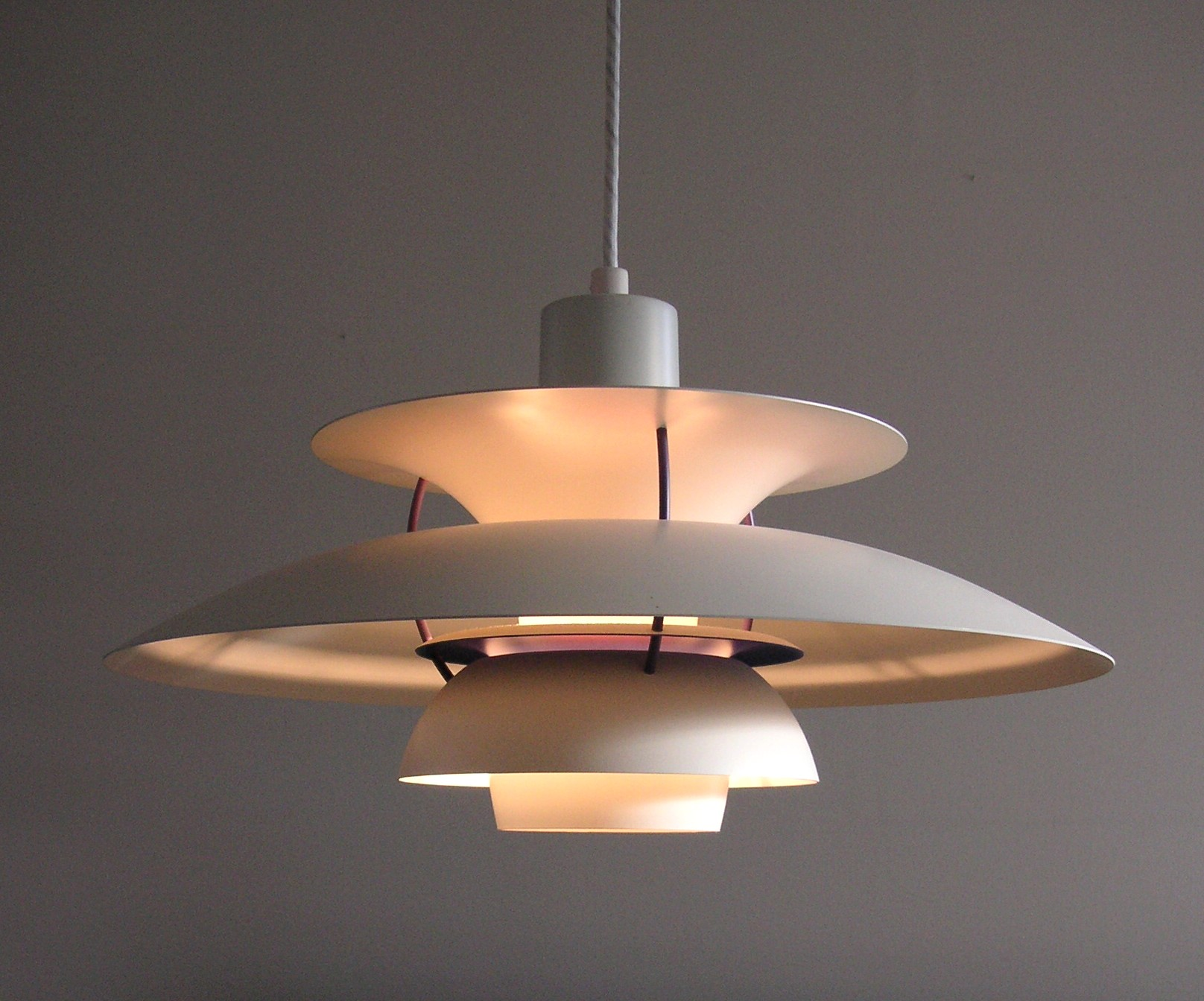

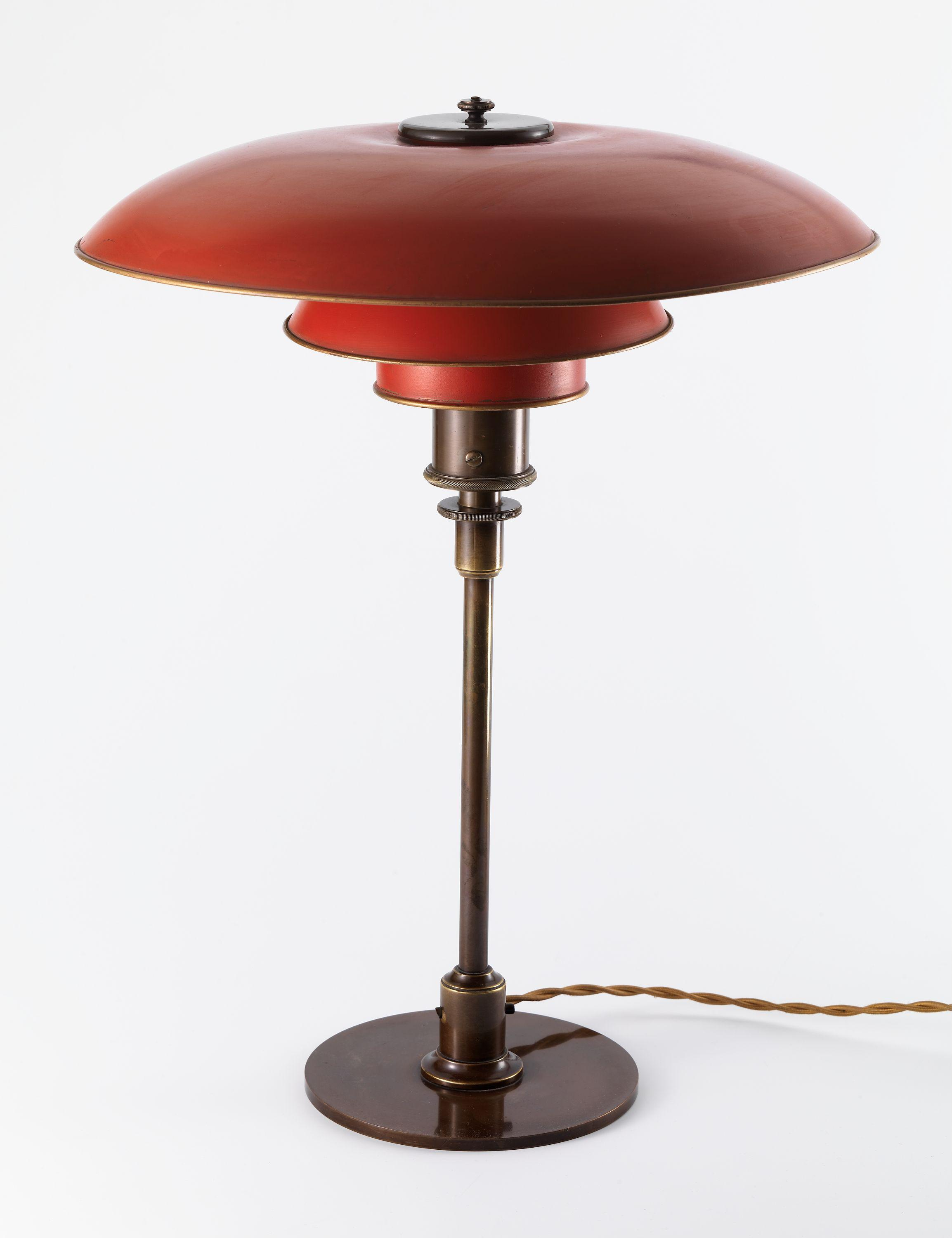

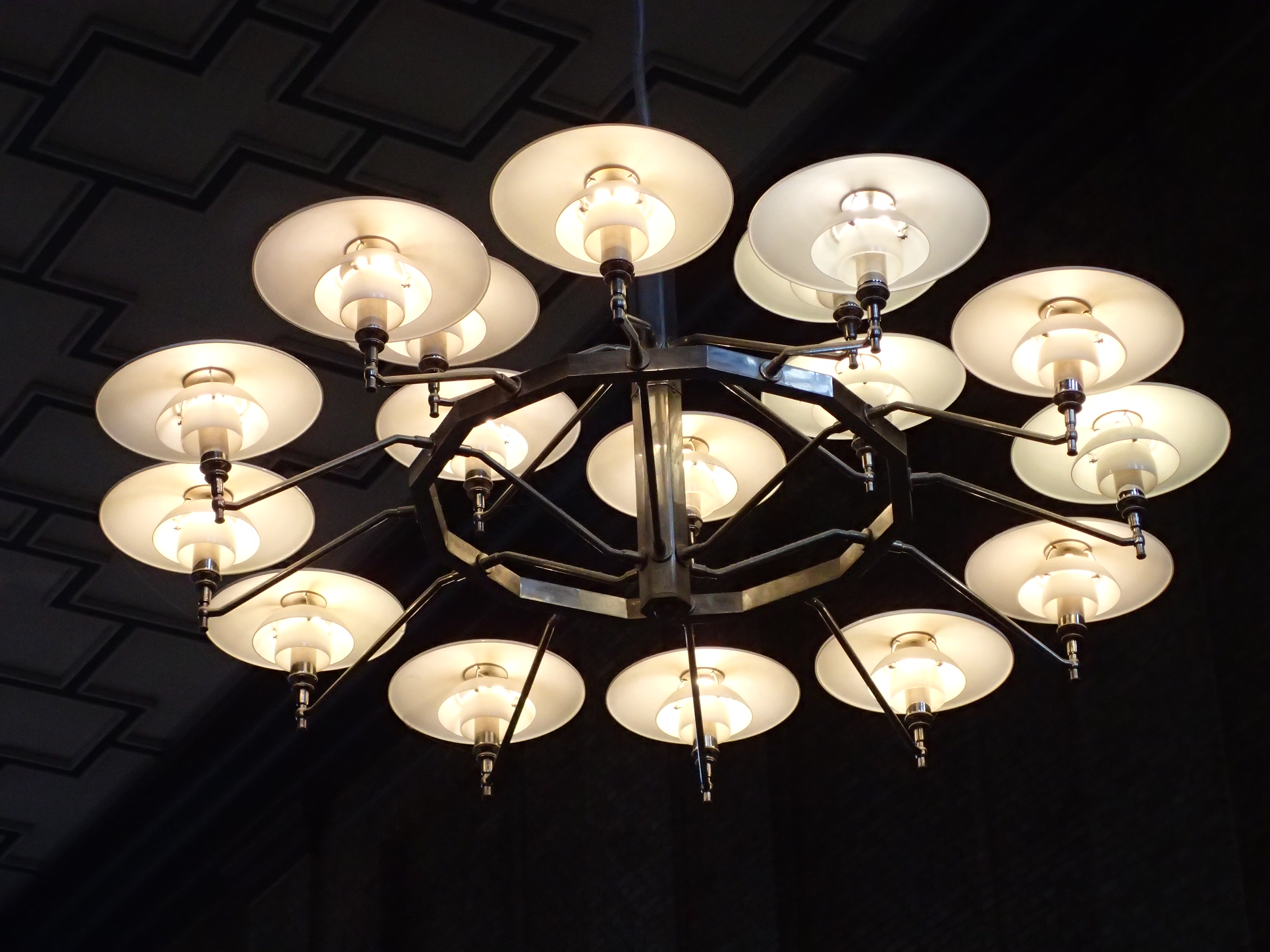

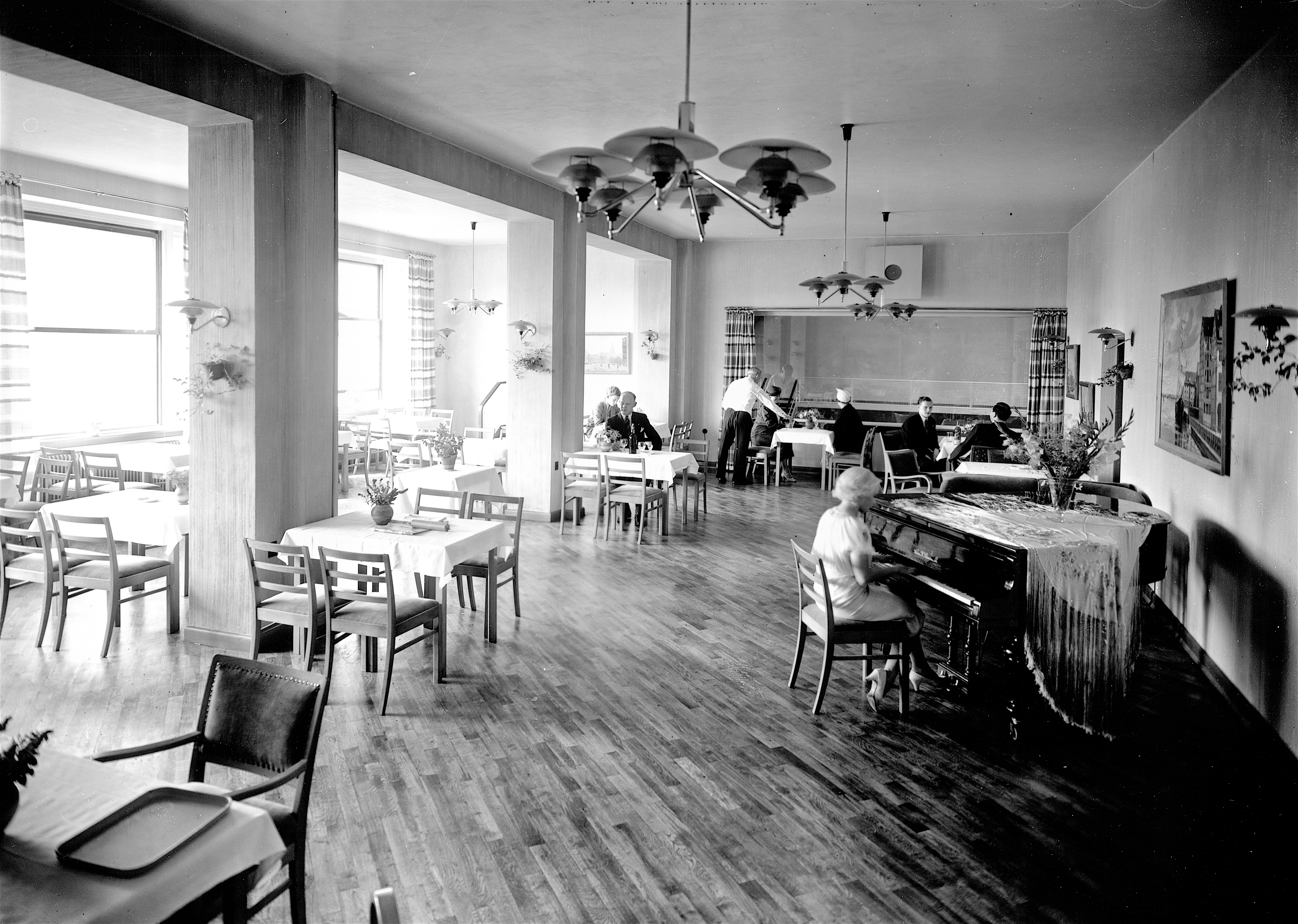

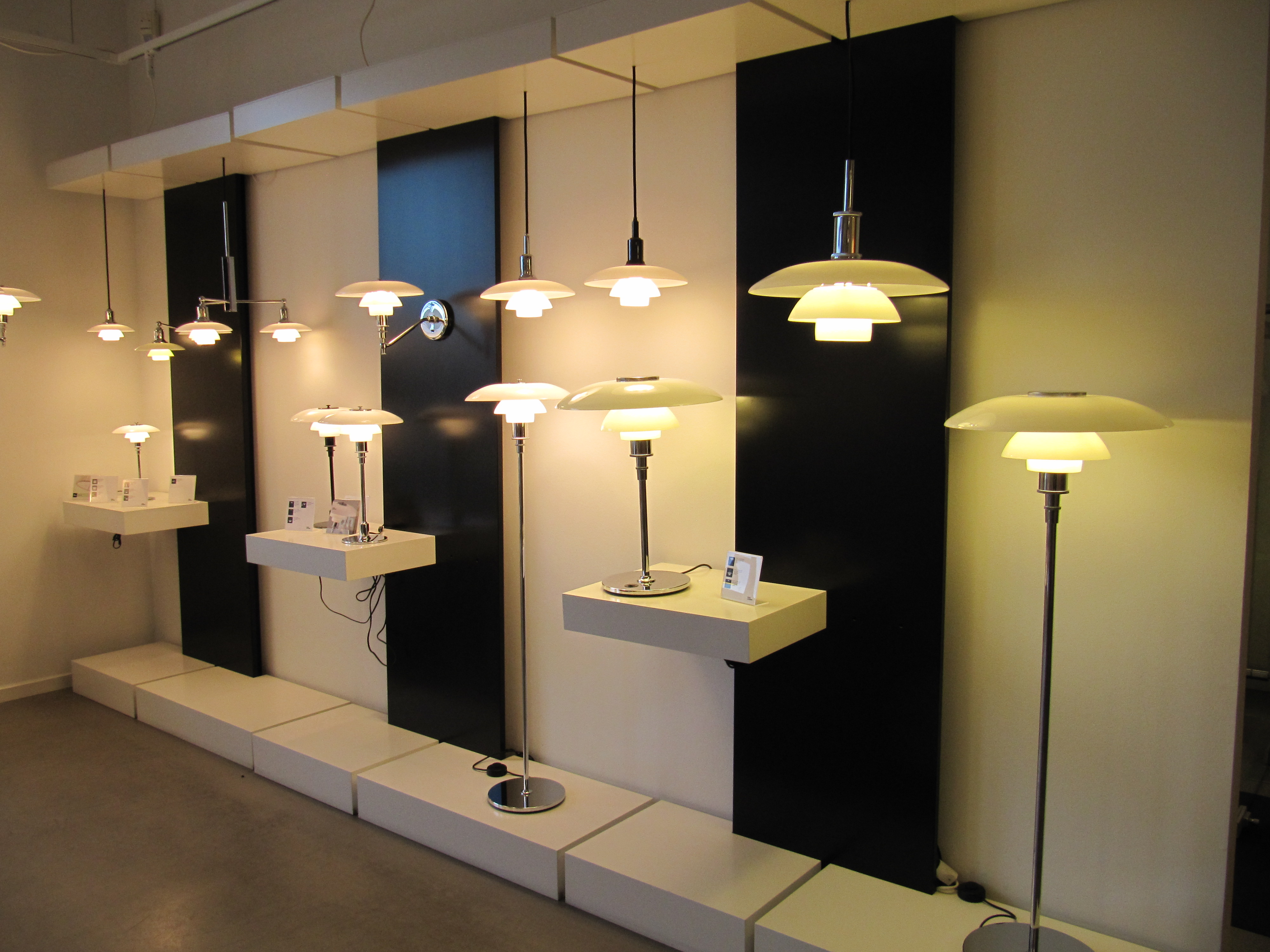
