= Kymi Sinfonietta =

Finnish orchestra

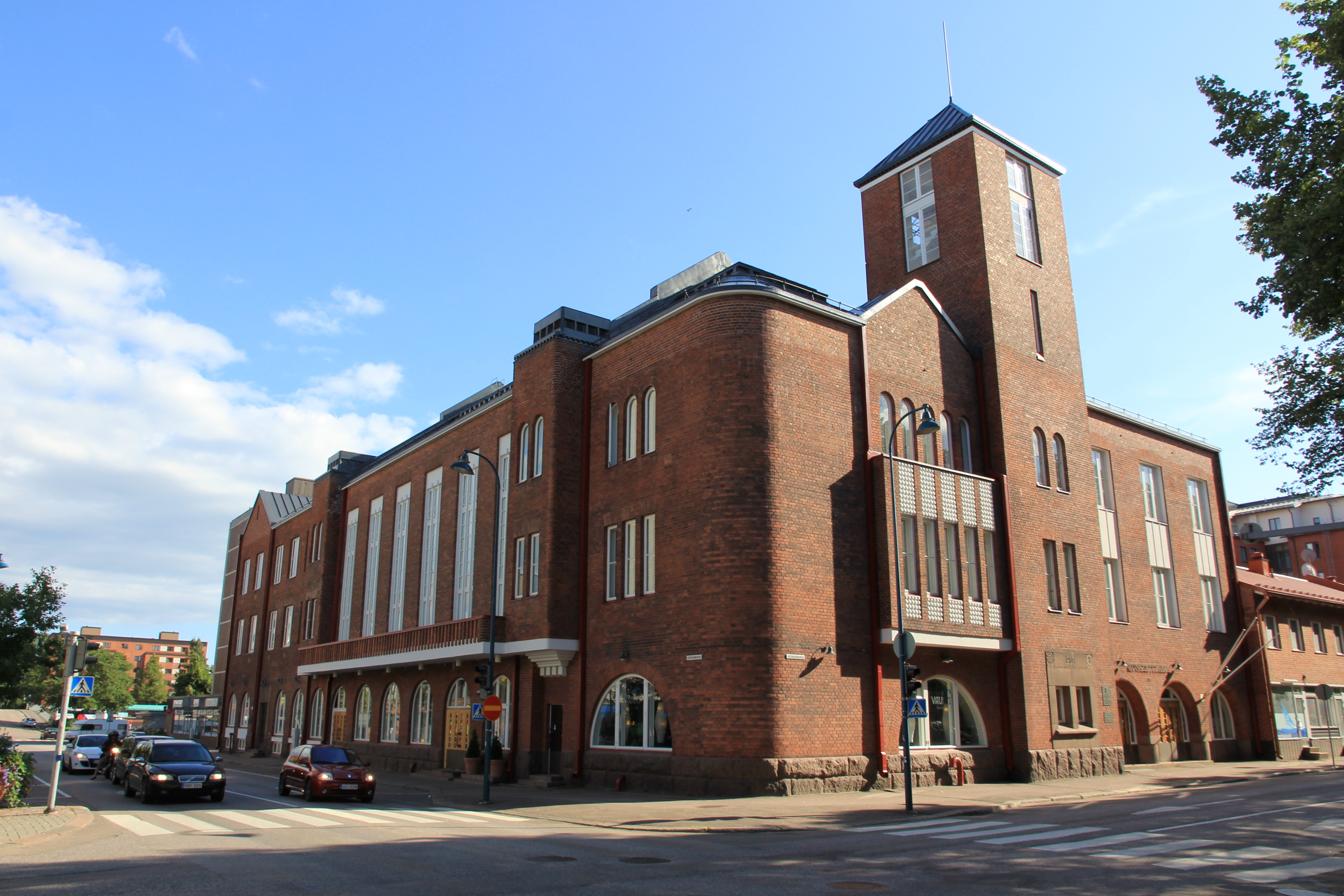
Kotka Concert Hall

The Kymi Sinfonietta is a sinfonietta-sized orchestra based in two Finnish cities, Kotka and Kouvola. The Kymi Sinfonietta was formed in 1999 after merging the Kotka and Kouvola City Orchestras and it is currently an ensemble of 31 regular players. Kymi Sinfonietta’s public performances range from about 100 to nearly 200 performances per year. Concerts by the Kymi Sinfonietta are held at Kotka Concert Hall on Wednesdays and Kouvola City Hall or Kuusankoski Hall on Thursdays.

The Kymi Sinfonietta has a very broad repertoire ranging from small chamber works to large symphonies and also lighter programs. The orchestra also organizes various musical and cultural events, such as performances in schools, kindergartens and retirement homes and premiers the finals works in the International Uuno Klami Composition Competition which is held every five years. The Kymi Sinfonietta has been performing internationally in St Petersbourg in 2003, 2012 and 2013, Heerlen, Netherlands in 2007, China in 2008, London in 2010 and Riga, Latvia in 2011.

The Kymi Sinfonietta’s first Artistic Director was Juha Nikkola (1999–2003). In the years 2004 to 2006 Dmitri Slobodeniouk held the position of the Principal Guest Conductor. The Japanese conductor Yasuo Shinozaki was Artistic Director from the beginning of 2007 to the summer of 2014. The Estonian conductor Olari Elts was hired as Artistic Director on 1 January 2018. The tenor and conductor Topi Lehtipuu and the jazz saxophonist Jukka Perko were appointed Artistic Partners for the 2023–2024 season.

The Kymi Sinfonietta performs regularly with Finnish and international artists such as Natalia Gutman, Michael Collins, Patrick Gallois, Monica Groop, Elina Vähälä, Kyoko Takezawa, Anthony Marwood, Pekka Kuusisto, Kari Kriikku, Olli Mustonen, and Alexei Lubimov and guest conductors such as Andres Mustonen, Andrew Lawrence-King, Nikolay Alexeyev, Hannu Lintu, Olari Elts, Dmitri Slobodeniouk and Alexander Mickelthwate. It has also collaborated with many orchestras and choirs, among them the Orchestras of St. Petersburg Philharmonia, the State Choir Latvija and the Saint Petersburg State Academic Choir.

== Recordings ==
- Klami Rhapsodie (2002)
- Täyttyneiden toiveiden maa (2004)
- KymiScenes (2007)

== See also ==
- The Kymi Sinfonietta’s homepage
- The Kymi Sinfonietta’s recordings
