= Männistö Church =

Church in Kuopio, Finland

Männistö Church Männistön kirkko, (in Finnish)
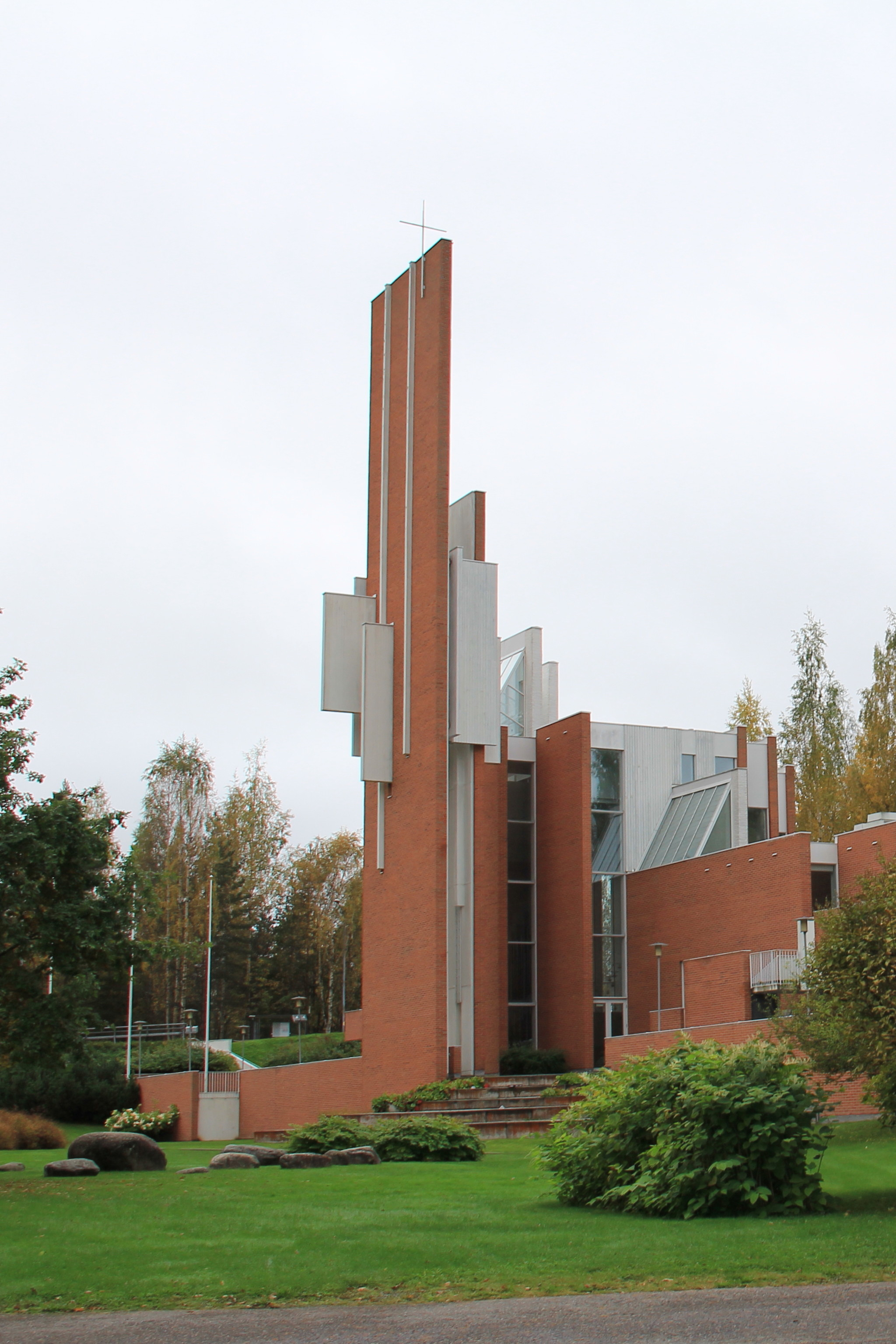
- Männistö Church

Religion
- Affiliation: Evangelical Lutheran Church of Finland
- District: Diocese of Kuopio

Location
- Location: Kuopio, Finland
- Interactive map of Männistö Church; Männistön kirkko, (in Finnish)

Architecture
- Architect: Juha Leiviskä
- Completed: 1992

Specifications
- Capacity: 449
- Materials: facade: mainly brick

Saint John's Church, Männistö (Finnish: Männistön Pyhän Johanneksen kirkko), is a Lutheran church in the Männistö neighborhood in the city of Kuopio. The church was designed by architect Juha Leiviskä together with Pekka Kivisalo, and completed in 1992. The interior of the church features an altarpiece by artist Markku Pääkkönen.
