= Lauha Männistö =

Finnish politician (1934–2017)

Lauha Unelma Männistö (10 January 1934 – 20 May 2017) was a Finnish politician, born in Jalasjärvi. She was a member of the Parliament of Finland from 1966 to 1991, representing the Finnish People's Democratic League (SKDL) until 1990 and the Left Alliance after that. She was a presidential elector in the 1968, 1978 and 1982 presidential elections.
