= Männistö =

City district in Kuopio, Finland

Coordinates: 62°54′07″N 27°42′31″E

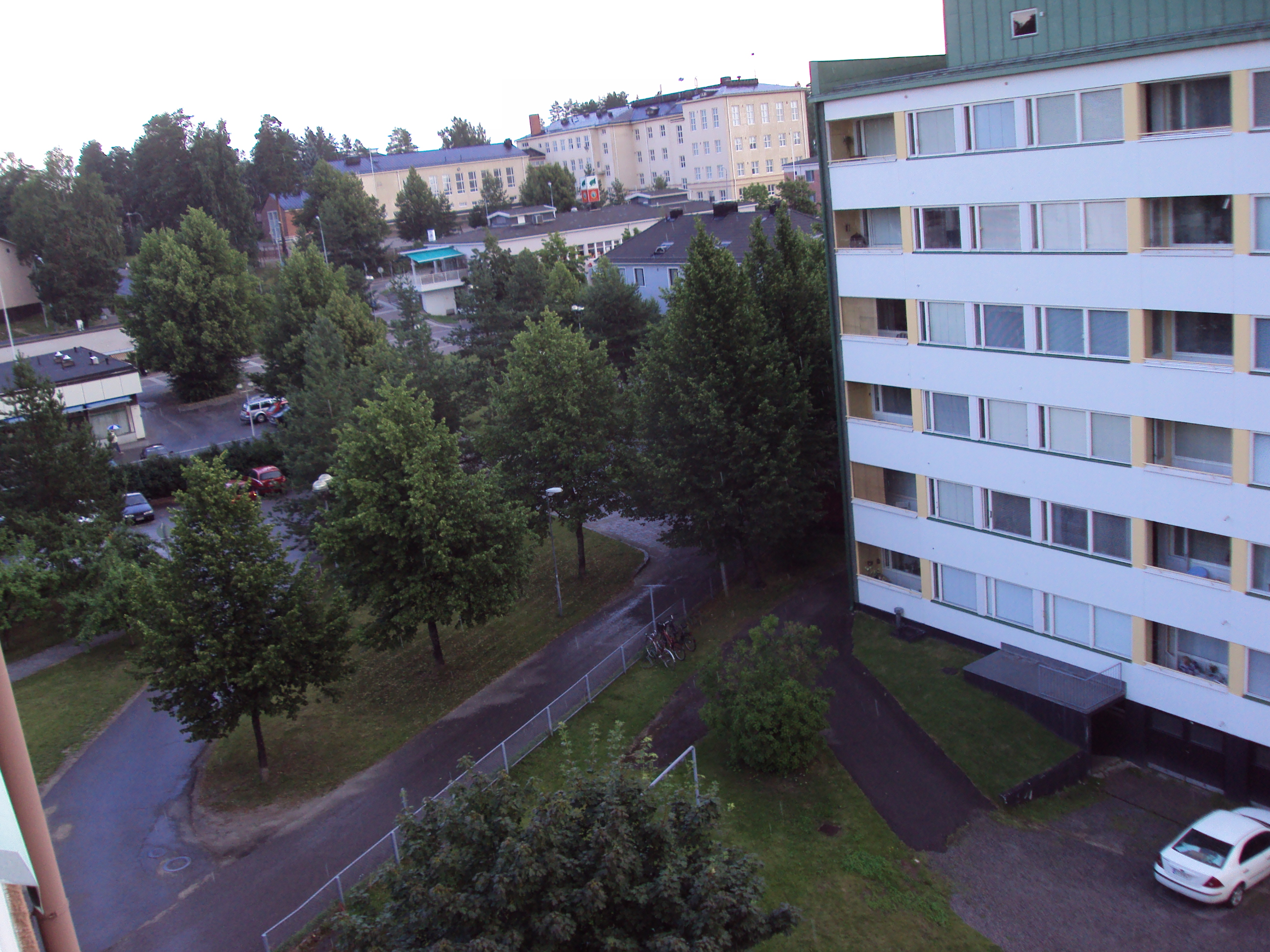
An aerial view of Männistö

Männistö is a district in the city of Kuopio, Finland It is part of the Itkonniemi–Männistö–Linnanpelto division area, which has a population of just over 5,800.

Most of the services are located in the Männistö shopping center, which has at least a grocery store K-Market, an R-kioski, a post office, a pizzeria, two bars and a few small businesses. There is also the St. Joseph's Catholic Church, a kindergarten and a youth center near the shopping center. There is also a Teboil gas station in the pine forest. Another church in the area, Männistö Church, is located on the Linnanpelto side.

== See also ==
- Elo Kuopio
