= Ewald =

Ewald is a given name and surname used primarily in Germany and Scandinavia. It derives from the Germanic roots ewa meaning "law" and wald meaning "power, brightness". Notable people the name include:

== Given name ==
- Either of the Two Ewalds, saints in Old Saxony about 692
- Bela Ewald Althans (born 1966), German neo-Nazi
- Ewald Ammende (1893–1936), Baltic German journalist and politician
- Ewald Arenz (born 1965), German radio host
- Ewald Balser (1898–1978), German actor
- Ewald Banse (1883–1953), German geographer
- Ewald Bonzet (1951–2016), South African runner
- Ewald Bosse (1880–1956), Swedish-Norwegian sociologist and economist
- Ewald Brenner (born 1975), Austrian footballer
- Ewald Bucher (1914–1991), German politician
- Ewald Burian (1896–1981), German officer and Knight's Cross recipient
- Ewald W. Busse (1917–2004), American psychiatrist and academic administrator
- Ewald Cebula (1917–2004), Polish footballer
- Ewald Daub (1889–1946), German cinematographer
- Ewald von Demandowsky (1906–1946), German film producer
- Ewald Demeyere (born 1974), Belgian harpsichordist
- Ewald Dytko (1914–1993), Polish footballer
- Ewald Eberle (1933–2025), Liechtenstein alpine skier
- Ewald Auguste Esselen (1858–1918), South African barrister
- Ewald Fabian (1885–1944), German dentist
- Ewald Flügel (1863–1914), German philologist
- Ewald Follmann (1926–1990), German footballer
- Ewald Frank (1933–2024), German preacher
- Ewald Frie (born 1962), German historian
- Ewald Grothe (born 1961), German historian
- Ewald Hammes (born 1950), German footballer
- Ewald Hecker (1843–1909), German psychiatrist
- Ewald Heer (1930–2025), German aerospace engineer
- Ewald Hering (1834–1918), German physiologist
- Ewald Friedrich von Hertzberg (1725–1795), Prussian politician
- Evald Ilyenkov (1924–1979), Soviet philosopher
- Ewald Janusz (1940–2017), Polish sprint canoer
- Ewald Jarmer (born 1942), German boxer
- Ewald Jenisch (born 1964), Austrian footballer
- Ewald Kienle (1928–2021), German inventor and entrepreneur
- Ewald Kihle (1919-1990), Norwegian footballer
- Ewald Kist (born 1944), Dutch field hockey player
- Ewald Kleisinger (1912–2000), Austrian Righteous Among the Nations
- Ewald von Kleist-Schmenzin (1890–1945), German politician and resistance member
- Ewald-Heinrich von Kleist-Schmenzin (1922–2013), German publisher
- Ewald Christian von Kleist (1715–1759), German poet and noble
- Ewald Georg von Kleist, German jurist, Lutheran cleric, and physicist
- Ewald von Kleist (1881–1954), German field marshal
- Ewald Kluge (1909–1964), German motorcycle racer
- Ewald Kooiman (1938–2009), Dutch organist
- Ewald Körner (1926–2010), German-Swiss clarinetist and conductor
- Ewald Krolis (1947–2006), Surinamese kaseko-singer and percussionist
- Ewald Lassen (1911–?), German classical violinist
- Ewald Latacz (1885–1953), German politician
- Ewald Lienen (born 1953), German football manager and former player
- Ewald Lindloff (1908–1945), Waffen-SS officer during World War II
- Ewald von Lochow (1855–1942), German general
- Ewald Loeser (1888–1970), German lawyer and war criminal
- Ewald Marggraff (1923–2003), Dutch noble
- Ewald Mataré (1887–1965), German painter and sculptor
- Ewald Meltzer (1869–1940), German physician
- Ewald Menzl (1908–1942), Czechoslovak bobsledder
- Ewald Mertens (1909–1965), German middle-distance runner
- Ewald Munschke (1901–1981), German politician
- Ewald Nowotny (born 1944), Austrian economist and politician
- Ewald Osers (1917–2011), Czech translator and poet
- Ewald Ospelt, Mayor of Vaduz from 2007 to 2019
- Ewald Over (1835–1912), German-American entrepreneur and American Civil War veteran
- Ewald Stefan Pollok (born 1941), German historian and writer
- Ewald Pyle (1910-2004), American baseball player
- Evald Relander (1856–1926), Finnish teacher and bank manager
- Ewald Riebschläger (1904–1993), German diver
- Ewald Rohlfs (1911–1984), German test pilot
- Ewald Heinrich Rübsaamen (1857–1919), German zoologist
- Ewald J. Schmeichel (1889–1975), American politician
- Ewald Schnug (born 1954), German agricultural scientist
- Ewald Schuldt (1914–1987), German prehistorian
- Ewald Schurer (1954–2017), German politician
- Ewald Gerhard Seeliger (1877–1959), German writer
- Ewald Stadler (born 1961), Austrian politician
- Ewald Steenkamp (born 1988), Namibian cricketer
- Ewald O. Stiehm (1886–1923), American sports coach
- Ewald Straesser (1867–1933), German composer
- Ewald Tauer (1941–2017), German wrestler
- Ewald Tilker (1911–1998), German canoeist
- Ewald Türmer (born 1960), Austrian footballer
- Ewald Ullmann (born 1943), Austrian footballer
- Ewald Urban (1913–1959), Polish footballer
- Ewald Walch (1940–2023), Austrian luger
- Ewald Weibel (1929–2019), Swiss anatomist and physiologist
- Ewald Wenck (1891–1981), German actor
- Ewald van der Westhuizen (born 1990), South African rugby union player
- Ewald Wichert (born 1940), German boxer
- Ewald Wiśniowski (1927–1970), Polish footballer
- Ewald Wollny (1846–1901), German agricultural physicist
- Ewald Wurzinger (born 1987), Austrian journalist

== Surname ==
- Alexander Charles Ewald (1842–1891), British civil servant and historical writer
- Andreas Ewald (born 1988), German politician
- Andrew Ewald, American cell biologist
- Anton Ewald (born 1993), Swedish singer and dancer
- Carl Ewald (1856–1908), Danish writer
- Carl Anton Ewald (1845–1915), German gastroenterologist
- Christian Wilhelm Karl Ewald (1852–1932), German politician
- Clara Ewald (1859–1948), German painter
- Collin Y. Ewald (born 1980), Swiss molecular biologist
- Douglas Ewald (1937–2021), American politician
- Ernst Ewald (1836–1904), German painter
- Ernst Julius Richard Ewald (1855–1921), German physiologist
- Ferdinand Christian Ewald (1802–1874), Anglican missionary
- François Ewald (born 1946), French philosopher
- Georg Ewald (1926–1973), East German politician
- Heinrich Ewald (1803–1875), German theologian
- Heinz Ewald (1922–2002), German World War II fighter pilot
- Jake Ewald (born 1993), American musician
- Jens Ewald (born 1983), German slalom canoeist
- Jesper Ewald (1893–1969), Danish writer
- Johann Ewald (1744–1813), German general
- Johannes Ewald (1743–1781), Danish national dramatist, psalm writer and poet
- Manfred Ewald (1926–2002), German politician
- Oskar Ewald (1881–1940), Hungarian-Austrian philosopher
- Paul Peter Ewald (1888–1985), German crystallographer and physicist
- Paul W. Ewald (born c. 1953), American evolutionary biologist
- Reinhold Ewald (born 1956), German physicist and astronaut
- Rosane Ewald (born 1973), Brazilian sports shooter
- Victor Ewald (1860–1935), Russian composer
- Wendy Ewald (born 1951), American photographer and educator
- Weronika Ewald (born 2006), Polish tennis player
- William Ewald, American philosopher and legal scholar
- William B. Ewald Jr. (1925–2015), American speechwriter and historian
- Wolfgang Ewald (1911–1995), German Luftwaffe ace

== See also ==
- Evald
