= Evald =

- Gender: Male

Origin
- Region of origin: Denmark, Estonia, Norway, Sweden

Other names
- Related names: Ewald

Evald is a masculine given name found primarily in Northern Europe, especially in Denmark, Estonia, Norway and Sweden. It is a cognate of the German given name Ewald and may refer to the following individuals:

- Eevald Äärma (1911–2005), Estonian pole vaulter and 1936 Olympic competitor
- Evald Aav (1900–1939), Estonian composer
- Evald Aavik (born 1941), Estonian actor
- Evald Flisar (born 1945), Slovenian writer, poet, playwright, editor and translator
- Evald Gering (1918–2007), Estonian-born Canadian sports shooter
- Evald Hermaküla (1941–2000), Estonian actor and director
- Evald Ilyenkov (1924–1979), Russian Marxist author and Soviet philosopher
- Evald Konno (1897–1942), Estonian politician and lawyer
- Evald Mahl (1915–2001), Estonian basketball player
- Evald Mikson (1911–1993), Estonian-born Icelandic football goalkeeper
- Evald Nielsen (1879–1958), Danish silversmith
- Evald Okas (1915–2011), Estonian painter
- Evald Relander (1856–1926), Finnish agronomist
- Evald Rygh (1842–1913), Norwegian banker and politician, former Minister of Finance and Customs
- Evald Schorm (1931–1988), Czech film and stage director, screenwriter and actor
- Evald Seepere (1911–1990), Estonian amateur featherweight boxer
- Evald Segerström (1902–1985), Swedish race walker
- Evald Sikk (1910–1945), Estonian wrestler
- Evald Seepere (1911–1990), Estonian boxer and 1936 Summer Olympic competitor
- Evald O. Solbakken (1898–1967), Norwegian newspaper editor and politician
- Evald Tang Kristensen (1843–1929), Danish folklore collector and author
- Evald Thomsen (1913–1993), Danish fiddler and collector and promoter of Danish traditional music
- Evald Tipner (1906–1947), Estonian football, ice hockey and bandy player
- Evald Tordik (1923–1989), Estonian opera singer

== See also ==
- Emmy Evald (1857–1946), Swedish-American philanthropist, teacher and feminist
