= Boas' point =

- Differential diagnosis: Gastric ulcer

Boas' point is an area of tenderness to palpation to the left of the 12th thoracic vertebra found in some patients with gastric ulcer.

This medical sign is named after Ismar Isidor Boas.
