= Princess Diana Memorial =

Monument in Vienna, Austria

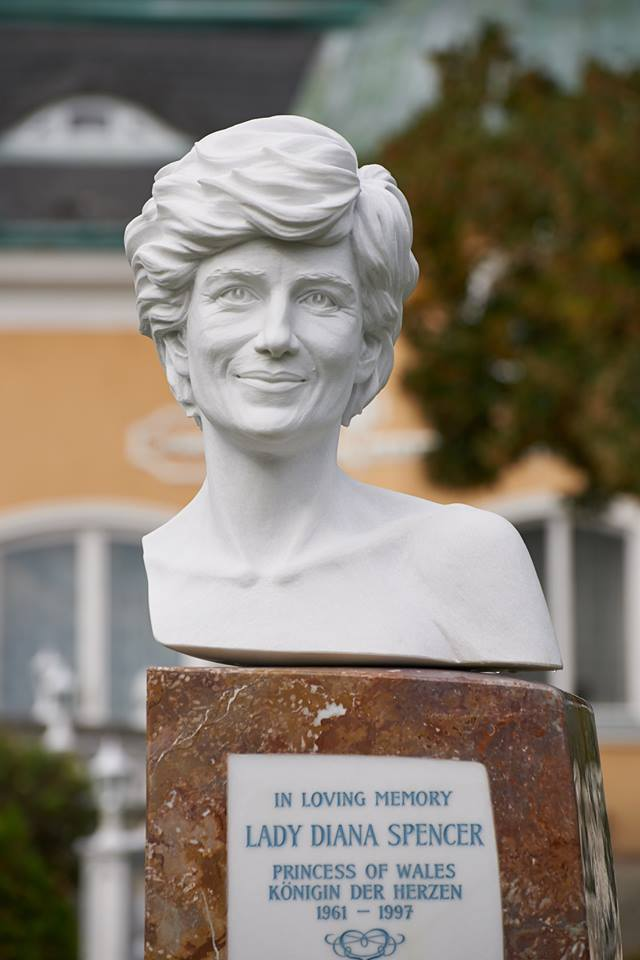
- Year: 2013
- Medium: Sculpture
- Subject: Diana, Princess of Wales
- Location: Vienna, Austria; 48°10′58.9″N 16°19′18.4″E

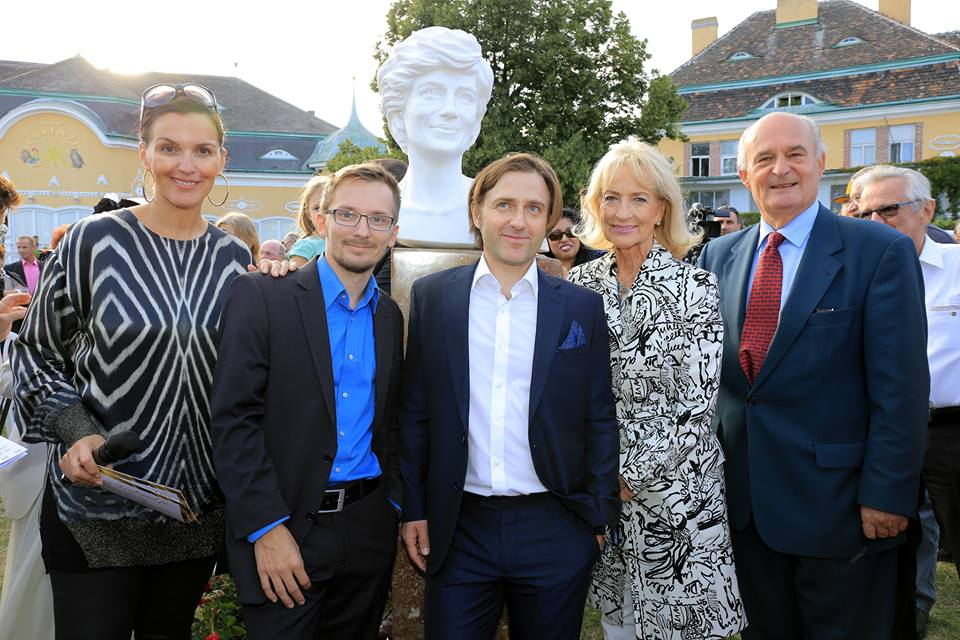
Lady Diana Memorial

The Princess Diana Memorial is a memorial dedicated to Diana, Princess of Wales, in Vienna. It is located in the garden of Cobenzl Castle, located in Schloss Schönbrunn in Vienna, Austria. The memorial consists of a plaque and bust of Diana. On the plaque, Diana is erroneously described as Lady Diana Spencer, a style she did not have at the time of her death and did not carry since her wedding in 1981. It is the first memorial dedicated to her in a German-speaking country.

Ewald Wurzinger, an Austrian radio journalist at ORF, is behind the private financed memorial. The white marble bust of Princess Diana boasts a dedication to the "Queen of Hearts". Diana's close friend Rosa Monckton has supported the memorial project. In 2014, the tribute was presented for the first time at Kensington Palace in London. The white bust and the memorial plaque were created by the Viennese sculptor Wolfgang Karnutsch. The memorial was financed through private donations.
