= Collin Y. Ewald =

Swiss molecular biologist (born 1980)

Collin Yvès Ewald
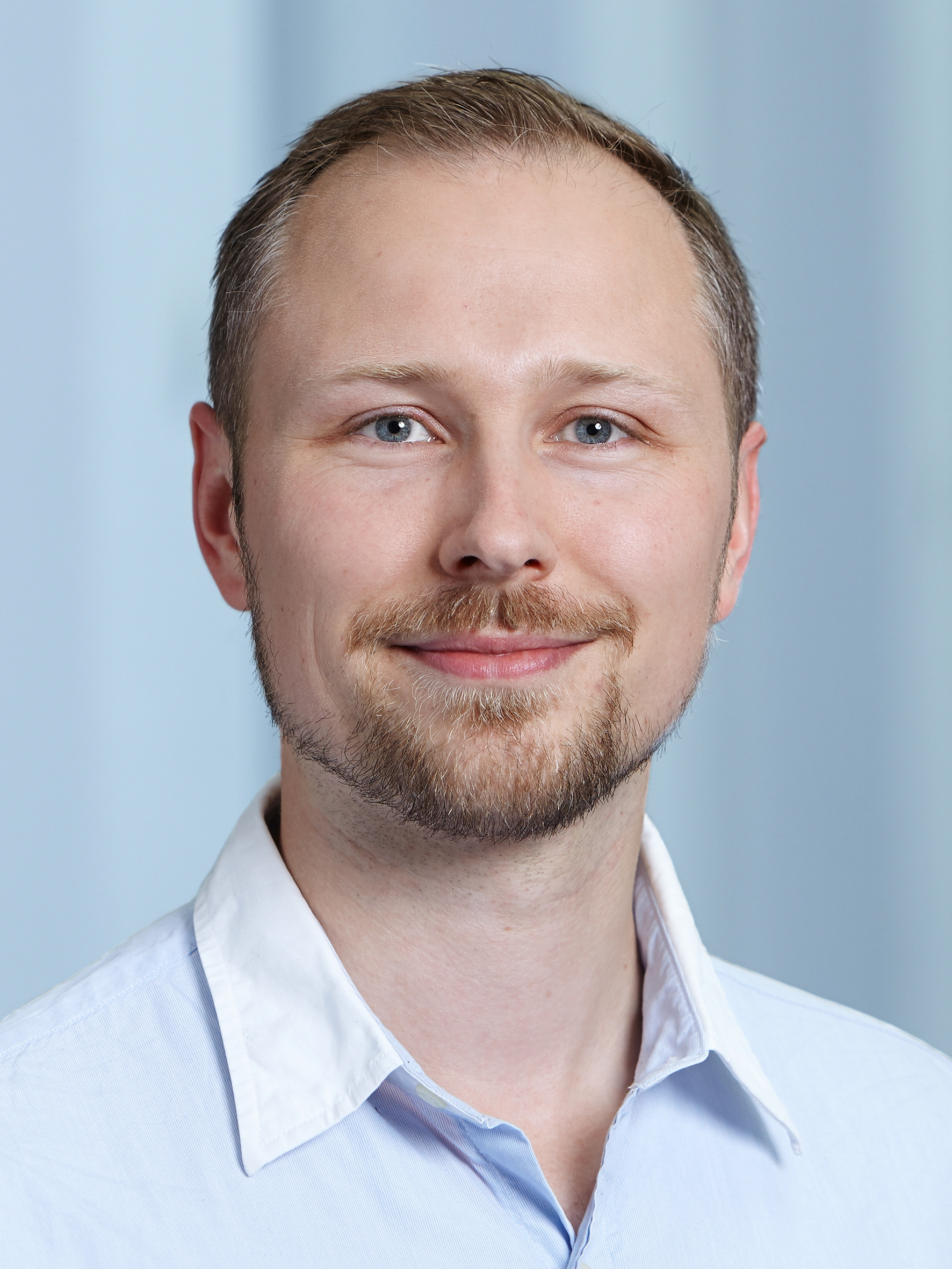
- Collin Y. Ewald in 2016
- Born: 1980 (age 45–46); Basel
- Citizenship: Swiss
- Education: University of Basel; CUNY Graduate Center
- Known for: Matreotype
- Scientific career
- Fields: Molecular biology, Genetics, Neuroscience
- Workplaces: ETH Zurich
- Thesis: Multifunctional roles of APL-1 in C. elegans (2011)
- Doctoral advisor: Christine Li
- Website: www.ewaldlab.com

Collin Yvès Ewald (born 1980 in Basel) is a Swiss scientist investigating the molecular mechanisms of healthy aging. He is a molecular biologist and a professor at ETH Zurich, where he leads the Laboratory of Extracellular Matrix Regeneration. His research focuses on the remodeling of the extracellular matrix during aging and upon longevity interventions.

== Career ==
Collin Ewald was educated at Mathematisch-Naturwissenschaftliches Gymnasium (MNG) Basel, Switzerland. After completing his bachelor in molecular biology at the University of Basel, he joined the labs of Joy Alcedo and Nancy Hynes studying the function of a breast cancer metastasis gene Memo1 in the model organism C. elegans at the Friedrich Miescher Institute (FMI) for Biomedical Research, Basel, Switzerland. In the Alcedo lab, he became interested in how neurons regulate aging and went on to do a Ph.D. in neuroscience at the Graduated Center of the City University of New York, USA. Mentored by his Ph.D. supervisor Chris Li, he discovered a conserved genetic link between Insulin/IGF-1 signaling and Alzheimer's disease amyloid precursor protein (APP) orthologues. To deepen his knowledge in aging research, he joined T. Keith Blackwell's lab as a postdoctoral fellow at Harvard Medical School, unraveling the importance of Insulin/IGF-1 signaling in promoting collagen homeostasis during longevity. In 2015, he became a junior faculty member at the Joslin Diabetes Center, instructor in medicine at Harvard Medical School, and visiting scholar at the Whitehead Institute (Massachusetts Institute of Technology). After ten years in the US, in 2016, he secured the SNSF professorship to return to Switzerland to join the Institute for Translational Medicine. as an assistant professor at ETH Zürich.

To be at the forefront and to interconnect the two research fields of aging and matrix biology, he founded the Swiss Society for Aging Research, is the vice president of the German Society of Aging Research, and he re-established the Swiss Society for Matrix Biology. He is an independent scientific advisor of the longevity-start-up-company-builder Maximon AG, and a co-founder of Avea Life AG.

== Research ==
His research centers around the remodeling of the extracellular matrix, ensuring tissue and cellular homeostasis during healthy aging. In collaboration with Alexandra Naba, he defined the proteins outside of cells forming the extracellular matrix, the so-called matrisome of C. elegans. Over ten thousand phenotypes stem from mutations in matrisome genes in humans and across species. He coined the term matreotype that is the extracellular matrix composition caused or associated by a cellular or physiological status, genotype, or phenotype. Using gene expression data from humans at different ages and tissues, his team defined the youthful matreotype and used it to predict drugs that slow aging. His research group also showed that even close to the end of an individual's life, it is possible to double the lifespan of C. elegans.

== Distinctions ==
He is named under the top 15 Longevity Influencer in Switzerland and world influencer ETH domain, Who is Who in Medical Research, is in the top 0.5% of the worldwide longevity experts, and has received multiple awards, including the Ellison Medical Foundation and American Federation for Aging Research fellowship in 2013, the DeLill Nasser Award in 2015, and the SNSF Professorship in 2016.

== Selected works ==
- Ewald CY, Landis JN, Porter Abate J, Murphy CT, Blackwell TK (2015). "Dauer-independent insulin/IGF-1-signalling implicates collagen remodelling in longevity". Nature. 519 (7541): 97–101. Bibcode:2015Natur.519...97E. doi:10.1038/nature14021. PMC 4352135. PMID 25517099.
- Ewald, Collin (2020). "The Matrisome during Aging and Longevity: A Systems-Level Approach toward Defining Matreotypes Promoting Healthy Aging". Gerontology. 66 (3): 266–274. doi:10.1159/000504295. PMC 7214094. PMID 31838471.
- Statzer C, Jongsma E, Liu SX, Dakhovnik A, Wandrey F, Mozharovskyi P, Zülli F, Ewald CY. (2021). "Youthful and age-related matreotypes predict drugs promoting longevity". Aging Cell. 20 (9) e13441. doi:10.1111/acel.13441. PMC 8441316. PMID 34346557.
- Venz R, Pekec T, Katic I, Ciosk R, Ewald CY. (2021). "End-of-life targeted auxin-mediated degradation of DAF-2 Insulin/IGF-1 receptor promotes longevity free from growth-related pathologies". eLife. 10. doi:10.7554/eLife.71335. PMC 8492056. PMID 34505574.
