= Kienle Resonator System =

Resonator system developed by Ewald Kienle

The Kienle Resonator System (also known as Kienle Sound System or Kienle Resonator Organ) has been developed by Ewald Kienle since 1970 to replace the loudspeaker reproduction used for digital organs which is regarded as unsatisfactory by many churchgoers.

== Emittance issues with digital organs ==
Loudspeakers often disturb the aesthetic overall impression in churches since, for acoustic reasons, they can only be hidden or covered insufficiently. More importantly, a loudspeaker cannot reproduce the sound characteristics of a pipe organ, such as the lively, spatially sound impression which is created by the tones moving between the organ pipes, or the high energetic efficiency factor and the projection of those tones into a space.

Furthermore, for the higher tones, the circular sound emittance characteristic for organ pipes can only be achieved to a very limited extent as loudspeakers become more directional at higher frequencies.

So, in some cases, several loudspeakers are located next to each other in a (semi) circle to obtain a more even emittance. Another possibility is to install the loudspeaker with the diaphragm facing up, and down and to divert the sound from the loudspeaker using a cone fixed above and below it (a so-called circular emitter). Although the area of even emittance is extended on the horizontal plane, the problem of an even sound distribution cannot be solved in a satisfactory way if the audience is seated at different heights with respect to the emitting device.

== Function ==
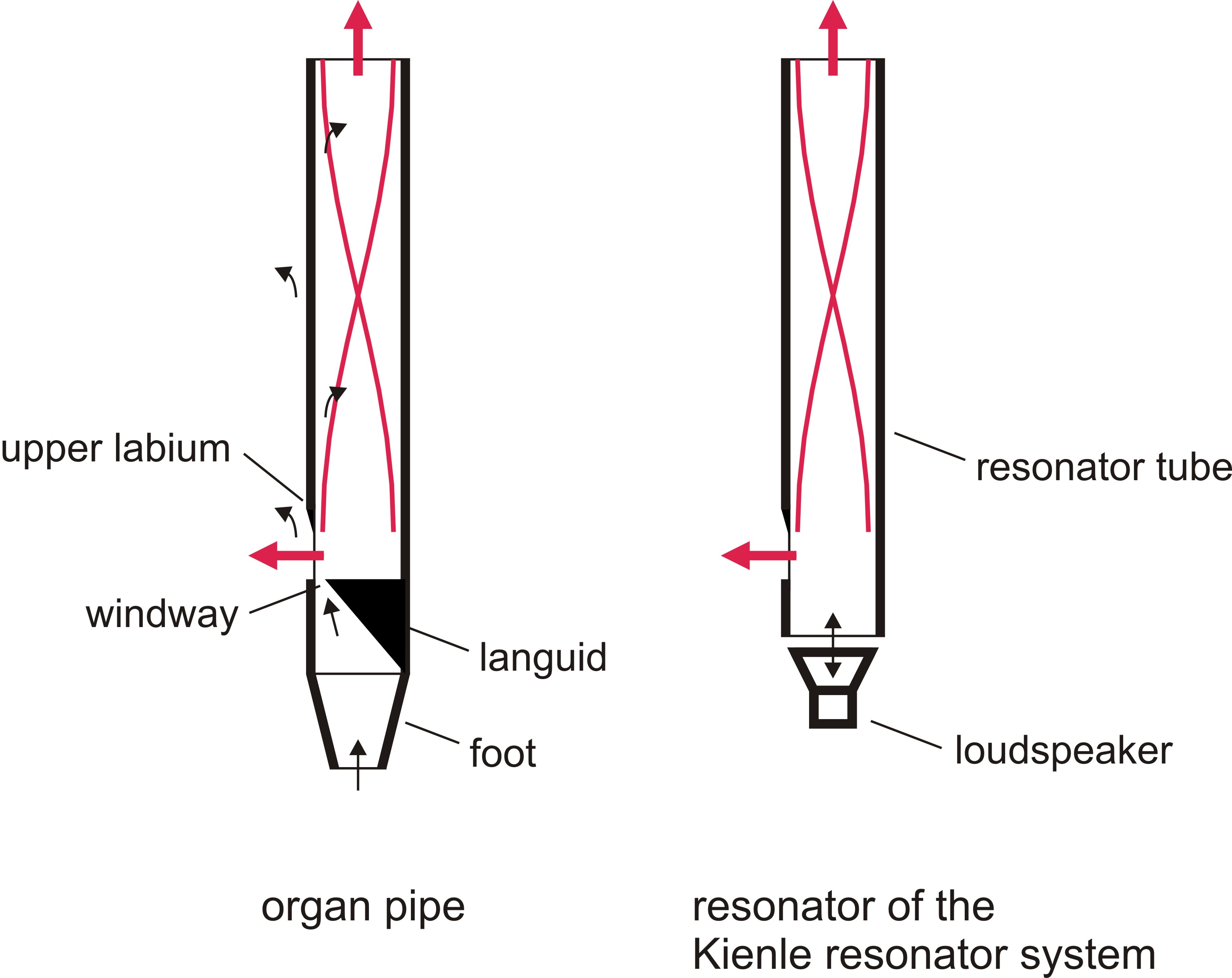
Schematic view of the stimulation of an oscillating air column in an organ pipe and in the Kienle Resonator System (black arrows: stimulating air flow; red: distribution of oscillation in the tube and sound emittance through the openings)

Ewald Kienle found the solution to the emittance problem by using the resonating bodies of the organ pipes for the sound emittance, while avoiding the usual complexities of airflow stimulation in the organ pipes. Instead, the air columns in the resonating bodies are stimulated by loudspeakers, a method which has been used in loudspeaker cabinet design since the middle of the 20th century, i.e. for transmission line housings.

The diagram shows the sound generation processes in an organ pipe and in the resonator of the Kienle Resonator System. To activate the organ pipe, the required air flow (black arrow) must be generated first in a sufficient quantity and supplied from below through the pipe foot. The air flow is directed through the windway against the upper labium where air vortexes replace each other, alternatingly between the inside and the outside. This process stimulates the air column in the tube and it starts to oscillate.

An example of the distribution of the sound wave's fundamental tone created in the tube is shown in the diagram by red curves. The node is located at the height of the curve intersection, the anti-nodes occur close to the openings emitting the main part of the sound. The oscillation of the air column and the sound emittance of the Kienle Resonator System occur in the same manner as in a traditional organ pipe. However, the air column in the tube is stimulated by a small loudspeaker which is installed at the lower end of the resonator and which provides the stimulating air flow by the reciprocating movement of its diaphragm.

== Technical advantages ==
The technical installation of a resonator system with organ characteristics is substantially simplified by the removal of the flow stimulation. All the parts which generate and control the air flow in a conventional pipe organ are omitted and therefore reduce the amount of installation and maintenance work. Sound quality problems, resulting from difficult or uncontrollable flow phenomena, can not occur. Furthermore, loudspeakers can be electrically controlled in a simple and precise manner.

This allows the controllable stimulation of both the key tone and the individual overtones in a resonator. Consequently, the sound of a great number of organ pipes can be reproduced with a relatively small number of resonators so that the required total number of emitting elements is considerably reduced without any noticeable loss of sound quality. While in larger pipe organs several thousand, sometimes even more than 10,000 organ pipes are required, the Kienle Resonator System needs considerably fewer resonators. According to the manufacturer’s information, the currently largest Kienle Resonator System in Tbilisi consists of only about 600 resonators although it could have been installed with half the number of resonators if this would have been requested for aesthetic and/or financial reasons. Depending on the design, the Kienle Resonator System can be relatively easily transported. This is an advantage in cases where it is difficult or inappropriate to permanently install facilities in a protected historic building.

== Technical design ==
The Kienle resonators can be manufactured both as simple tubes, with a circular cross-section (without labium), and traditional organ pipes as “pipe resonators” (with labium, but without core). Mostly, the resonators for the key tones of the lower frequencies (below 64 Hz) and the resonators for the higher frequencies (above 500 Hz) are built without a labium. In this case, not every resonator must be stimulated by its own loudspeaker. The resonators with a tube diameter of approximately 120 mm working at very low frequencies are often activated by a so-called collective stimulation which stimulates simultaneously five to ten resonators by means of one or two bass loudspeakers. In the case of high frequencies, several resonators with tube diameters of only approximately 5 – 25 mm, can be positioned above only one loudspeaker.

Instead of tin organ pipes, Kienle resonator tubes made of zinc or aluminum and also non-metallic materials such as acrylic glass or coated PVC. Besides visual, aesthetic and financial reasons, the influence of the respective material on the sound production is taken into consideration as, though only to a small extent, the sound production is also determined by oscillations of the pipe tube walls.

The Kienle resonator system is protected with patents by the producer company. The first patent (DE000002924473C2) was filed in 1979, the currently last patent (DE102012109002B4) was granted in 2017.
