= Ismar Isidor Boas =

German-Jewish gastroenterologist (1858–1938)

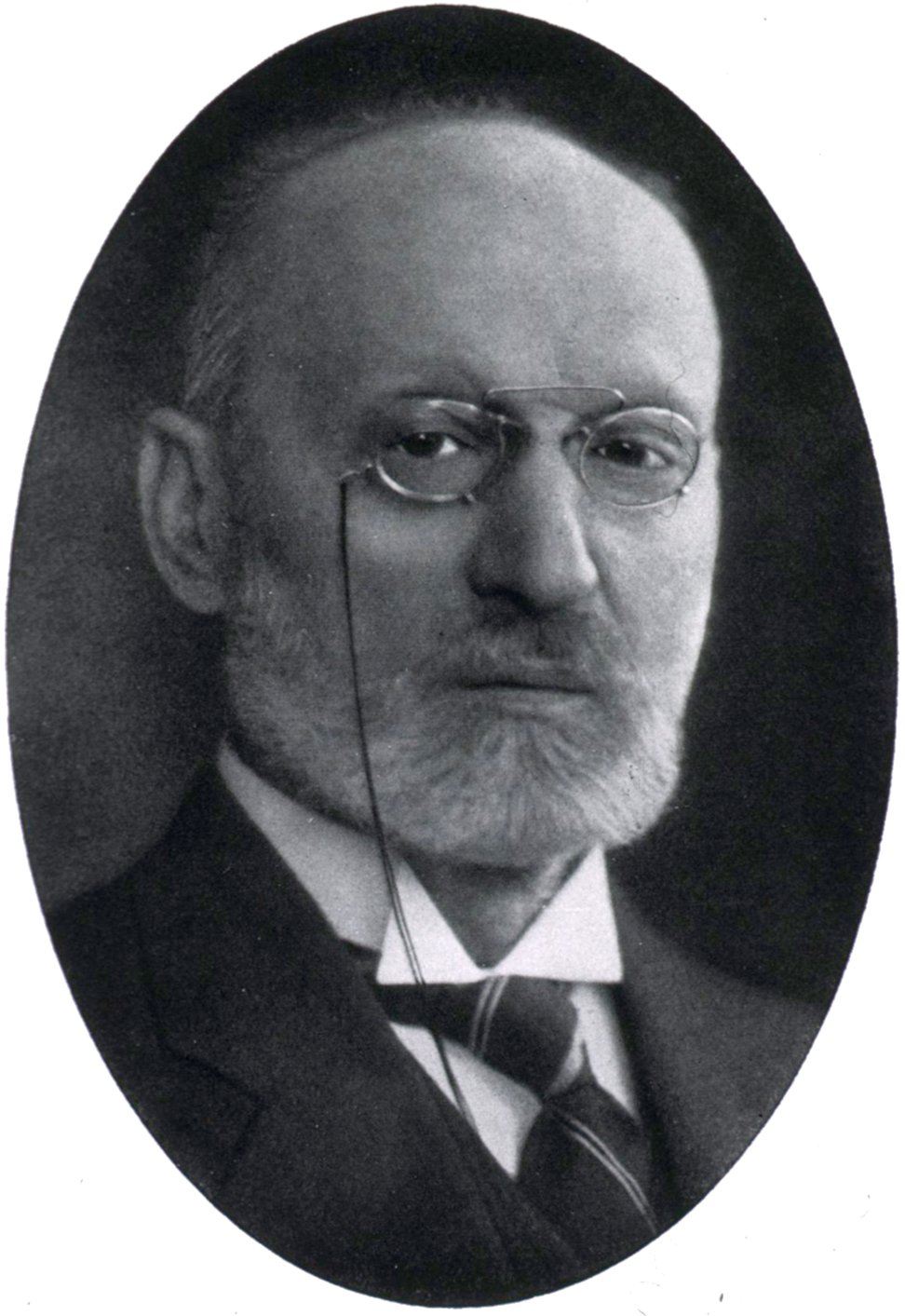
Ismar Boas (1858-1938)

Ismar Isidor Boas (28 March 1858 – 15 March 1938) was a German gastroenterologist born in the town of Exin, then in the Prussian Province of Posen, today in Poland.

Boas was born in the family of a small merchant and among several siblings he was the only one who was educated. He went to a high school in Zülichau in Silesia and then studied medicine in Berlin, Halle and Leipzig, and subsequently became an assistant to Carl Anton Ewald (1845-1915) at the Augusta Hospital in Berlin. In 1886, he became a licensed specialist of gastro-intestinal diseases in Berlin.

Boas was one of the leading authorities on gastroenterology in Europe. Alone, and with Professor Ewald, he made several contributions regarding the pathology and physiology of digestion. He described Lactobacillus acidophilus, a bacillus found in the gastric juice of individuals with stomach carcinoma. This bacterium is sometimes referred to as the "Boas-Oppler bacillus".

In 1895 he founded the Archiv für Verdauungs-Krankheiten, the first medical journal dedicated to gastroenterological topics, and in 1913 established the German gastroenterological society (Deutsche Gesellschaft für Verdauungs- und Stoffwechselkrankheiten). He set up a policlinic in the north of Berlin. He also has a handful of eponyms named in his honor, including:

- "Boas' algesimeter": an instrument used for determining the sensitiveness over the epigastrium.
- "Boas' point": a tender spot to the left of the twelfth thoracic vertebra in individuals with gastric ulcer.

Being a Jew, Boas lost his teaching position in the University of Berlin and left for Vienna in 1936. His wife escaped to Holland. When the Nazis entered Austria, he killed himself with an overdose of the sedative Veronal. His wife Sophie and son Kurt, a dermatologist, were killed by the Nazis.

== Other sources ==
- Harro Jenss, Guido Gerken, Markus M. Lerch (2013). 100 Jahre Deutsche Gesellschaft für Verdauungs- und Stoffwechselkrankheiten DGVS. August Dreesbach Verlag Munich. ISBN 978-3-944334-17-2 (Online).
- "Ismar Isidor Boas". Who Named It. Archived from the original on November 23, 2023.
