= Ewald Stefan Pollok =

German historian and writer (born 1941)

Ewald Stefan Pollok (born March 25, 1941, in Buchenhöh in Upper Silesia, Nazi Germany) publicist, author of several books on the subject of Silesia.

He comes from the village of Żyrowa (renamed Buchenhöh in 1936-1945) in Poland located in the Opole Voivodeship of the region of Silesia. Like some Silesians who sought German citizenship after 1990, he had chosen to work in the Federal Republic of Germany. He presently resides in Wildflecken in Bavaria. Mr. Pollok is the head editor responsible for the editorial content of a German Internet site: silesia-schlesien.com. Since early 2006 Mr. Pollok has practiced signing his name with the scientific title of doctor (Dr) under his posts on his internetsite. Mr. Pollok bought the title of Doctorate Major in History University of NorthWest New York USA, in a private school whose certificates are worthless. At the request of the Public Prosecutor’s Office in Schweinfurt, the District Court in Bad Kissingen issued on 25 June 2020 a penal order of 30 daily rates for the illegal use of the doctor’s title under §132a of the German Criminal Code: misuse of titles, professional titles and awards. The criminal warrant has been valid since 20 July 2020.

He has authored articles in popular press and newspapers, which were published in Poland and Germany.

The following is the list of his publications:

- 1998 - Legendy, manipulacje, kłamstwa... (Legends, Manipulations, Lies - in Polish, 15,000 copies)
- 1999 - Historia Żyrowy (History of Zyrowa – in Polish)
- 2000 - Góra Św. Anny. Śląska świętość (Sankt Annaberg. Silesian Sanctity – in Polish, several thousand copies)
- 2000 - 720 lat Żyrowy//720 Jahre Buchenhöh/Zyrowa
- 2001 - Das Leben der Deutschen in Oberschlesien 1945-1989 (The life of the Germans in Upper Silesia 1945-1989)
- 2002 - Stosunek polskiego kościoła do byłych terenów niemieckich po 1945 r. w Polsce//Die Haltung der polnischen Kirche gegenüber den ehemals deutschen Gebieten nach 1945 (The stance of the Polish church over the former German territories after 1945)
- 2004 - Śląskie tragedie (Silesian Tragedies – in Polish, several thousand copies)
- 2005 - Oberschlesiens unbewältigte Vergangenheit (Upper Silesia's unresolved history)
- 2009 - Legenden, Manipulationen, Lügen ( Legends, Manipulations, Lies - in German, few hundred copies)

He is also a co-author of the four following publications:

- Życie bez fikcji
- Nachbarn. Texte aus Polen (Neighbours. Writings from Poland)
- Die politische Entwicklung der Deutschen im Oppelner Schlesien. (The political progress of the Germans in the Opole Voivodeship)
- Życie codzienne na Górnym Śląsku po 1945 roku (The daily life in Upper Silesia after 1945)

== Controversy ==
1. His publications have often raised controversy in the past because they challenged the long established views of the post World War II history and tend to focus exclusively on the crimes against Silesians and Germans in the aftermath of this war without, critics claim, acknowledging the proper context of those times. The corollary of this criticism concerns perceived anti-Polish bias and trivialization of crimes against the Poles.
2. After 2006, for some time now, the Polish media, usually sensitive to historically controversial topics of World War II, have almost entirely ignored Mr. Pollok's contentious publications. A rare exception was a short 2009 lampoon of his Internet site, silesia-schlesien.com, by the left leaning Polish weekly "Przegląd". A very short text there entitled "Something nice for everybody" lists the invariably gloomy sounding titles of articles published by silesia-schlesien.com., such as "Polish national illusions", "Abuse and cruelty towards Germans", "Poland, the least liked neighbor of Germany" and then joyfully, in a stark contrast to the all-present gloom and doom, proceeds to invite its prospective readers to have a nice time reading.
