= Alexander Charles Ewald =

British civil servant and historical writer (1842–1891)

Alexander Charles Ewald (1842–1891) was an English civil servant, known as a historical writer.

== Life ==
He was born at Jerusalem, the son of Christian Ferdinand Ewald (1802–1874), who from a Jewish family became a Christian convert working for the London Society for Propagating the Gospel among the Jews. He was educated abroad and was appointed to a clerkship in the Public Record Office in 1861, rising to be senior clerk by 1890. He died at 31 Victoria Road, Upper Norwood, on 20 June 1891.

== Works ==
While at the Public Record Office, Ewald was mainly responsible for the completion of the work begun by Thomas Duffus Hardy in 1835: a full calendar and précis of the Norman Rolls-Henry V. It was printed in vols. xli. and xlii. of the Deputy-keeper's Reports (1880 and 1881), and supplemented by a glossary prepared by Ewald. He also wrote less technical historical works, including:

- A Reference Book of English History, 1866 and 1867.
- Our Constitution: an Epitome of our Chief Laws and System of Government, 1867.
- The Last Century of Universal History (1767–1867), 1868.
- Our Public Records: a Brief Handbook to the National Archives, 1873.
- Life and Times of Algernon Sydney, 1873, 2 vols.
- Life and Times of Prince Charles Stuart, Count of Albany, 1875 and 1883, 2 vols.
- Sir Robert Walpole: a Political Biography, 1877.
- Representative Statesmen, 1879, 2 vols.
- Stories from the State Papers, 1881, 2 vols.
- The Rt. Hon. Benjamin Disraeli and his Times, 1883, 2 vols.
- Leaders of the Senate: a Biographical History of the Rise and Development of the British Constitution, 1884–5, 2 vols.
- Studies Re-studied: Historical Sketches from Original Sources, 1885.
- The Life of Sir Joseph Napier, Bart., 1887.
- Paper and Parchment (Record Office Studies), 1890.

== Notes ==
Attribution

This article incorporates text from a publication now in the public domain: Lee, Sidney, ed. (1901). "Ewald, Alexander Charles". Dictionary of National Biography (1st supplement). Vol. 2. London: Smith, Elder & Co.
