= Ewald Kist =

Dutch field hockey player (born 1944)

Personal information
- Nationality: Dutch
- Born: 22 January 1944 (age 82) Wassenaar, Netherlands

Sport
- Sport: Field hockey

Ewald Kist (born 22 January 1944) is a Dutch former field hockey player. He competed in the men's tournament at the 1968 Summer Olympics.
