= Ferdinand Christian Ewald =

Anglican missionary (1802–1874)

- Born: 14 September 1802; Maroldsweisach, Bavaria, Holy Roman Empire
- Died: 9 August 1874 (aged 71); Upper Norwood, London, United Kingdom
- Education: University of Erlangen
- Spouses: Mary Anna Crickmer (m. 1836); Anna Cooke Yarborough (m. 1846)
- Children: Alexander Charles Ewald
- Religion: Protestantism

Ferdinand Christian Ewald (14 September 1802 – 9 August 1874) was a Bavarian-born English clergyman and missionary.

Ewald was born to Jewish parents in Maroldsweisach, Bavaria, and baptized at Basel when about 23 years of age. In 1829 he entered the service of the London Society for Propagating the Gospel Among the Jews, by which he was sent to Tunis in 1831. He proselytised assiduously among the Jews in Algiers, Tunis, Tripoli, and other large towns in North Africa until 1841 or 1842, when he accompanied as chaplain Bishop Alexander to Jerusalem. Here he remained till 1849, when ill health compelled him to return to London. He was largely instrumental in founding in 1853 the Wanderers' Home in London, an asylum for "doubting Jews and needy proselytes."

In addition to reports on his missionary labors in North Africa and Jerusalem, he published a German translation of Avodah Zarah (1856). The University of Erlangen, of which Ewald was a graduate, on the publication of this work, conferred upon him the diploma of a Doctor of Philosophy, and Archbishop Tait conferred upon him, in 1872, the degree of Bachelor of Divinity in consideration "of his uprightness of life, sound doctrine, and purity of morals; of his proficiency in the study of divinity, of Hebrew and Oriental languages and literature; and also of his missionary labors and eminent services in the promotion of Christianity among the Jews."

== Publications ==
- Murāsalah bayna ʻabdihi taʻālá Iwald al-Qissīs al-Inkilīzī wa-bayna baʻḍ ṭalabat al-ʻilm bi-Tūnis al-maḥrūsah (in Arabic). Malta: s.n. 1841.
- Journal of Missionary Labours in the City of Jerusalem During the Years 1842–3–4. London: B. Wertheim. 1845.
- Abodah sarah; oder, Der Götzendienst, ein Traktak aus dem Talmud (in German) (2nd ed.). Nürnberg: Joh. Phil. Raw'sche Buchhandlung. 1868.
