= MEMO1 =

Protein-coding gene in Homo sapiens

Identifiers
- Aliases: MEMO1, C2orf4, MEMO, NS5ATP7, CGI-27, mediator of cell motility 1
- External IDs: OMIM: 611786; MGI: 1924140; HomoloGene: 6272; GeneCards: MEMO1; OMA:MEMO1 - orthologs

Gene location (Human)
Chr.	Chromosome 2 (human)
Band	2p22.3	Start	31,865,060 bp
Band	2p22.3	End	32,011,230 bp

Gene location (Mouse)
Chr.	Chromosome 17 (mouse)
Band	17|17 E2	Start	74,506,031 bp
Band	17|17 E2	End	74,602,516 bp
RNA expression pattern
Bgee	Human / Mouse (ortholog); Top expressed in: left testis; right testis; gastrocnemius muscle; monocyte; corpus callosum; ventricular zone; muscle of thigh; lymph node; mucosa of esophagus; left ventricle / Top expressed in: spermatocyte; blood; lens; spermatid; hair follicle; tail of embryo; seminiferous tubule; ventricular zone; tibiofemoral joint; zygote; More reference expression data
BioGPS	n/a
Gene ontology
Molecular function	protein binding
Cellular component	nucleus; cytosol
Biological process	regulation of microtubule-based process; regulation of cell motility
Sources:Amigo / QuickGO
Orthologs
Species	Human	Mouse
Entrez	51072	76890
Ensembl	ENSG00000162959	ENSMUSG00000058704
UniProt	Q9Y316	Q91VH6
RefSeq (mRNA)	NM_001137602; NM_015955; NM_001301833; NM_001301852	NM_133771
RefSeq (protein)	NP_001131074; NP_001288762; NP_001288781; NP_057039; NP_001358841 NP_001358842; NP_001358843; NP_001358844; NP_001358845; NP_001358846; NP_001358847; NP_001358849; NP_001358850	NP_598532
Location (UCSC)	Chr 2: 31.87 – 32.01 Mb	Chr 17: 74.51 – 74.6 Mb
PubMed search
- Wikidata
View/Edit Human	View/Edit Mouse

Mediator of cell motility 1 is a protein that in humans is encoded by the MEMO1 gene.
