= Ewald Demeyere =

Belgian harpsichordist (born 1974)

Ewald Demeyere (born 1974) is a Belgian harpsichordist, conductor and music theorist. He is known as an expert in partimento realization and counterpoint.

== Education ==
Ewald Demeyere received his Master's degree in harpsichord at the University College Antwerp. Immediately after his studies, he became a teacher of harmony, counterpoint and fugue. In 2002, he succeeded Jos van Immerseel as senior lecturer in historical harpsichord. In 2009, Demeyere obtained the degree of Doctor in the Arts at the University of Antwerp and Artesis Hogeschool Antwerpen with the thesis A Contextual, Text-Critical Analysis of Johann Sebastian Bach's Art of Fugue – Reflections on Performance Practice and Text-Critical Analysis, and the interaction between them. In 2013, his book Johann Sebastian Bach's Art of Fugue – Performance Practice based on German Eighteenth-Century Theory was published by Leuven University Press.

== Teaching ==
- Partimento, improvisation, oratorio and historical performance practice at the University College Antwerp.
- Harpsichord, partimento and improvisation at the Institut Supérieur de Musique et de Pédagogie of Namur, where he also heads the Early Music department.

== Discography ==
| Year of release | Title |
|---|---|
| 2011 | 18th-Century Flemish Harpsichord Music |
| 2013 | Tears – Harpsichord laments from the 17th-Century |
| 2016 | Wolfgang Amadeus Mozart – Gran Partita |
| 2020 | Bach & Mozart Keyboard Variations on Harpsichord |

== Awards ==
- C.P.E. Bach The Complete Works Counterpoint Contest (2018) – Winner

== Books ==
- Demeyere, Ewald (2013). Johann Sebastian Bach's Art of Fugue—Performance Practice Based on German Eighteenth-Century Theory. Leuven University Press. ISBN 9789058679406.

== Articles ==
- Demeyere, Ewald (2018). "On Fedele Fenaroli's Pedagogy: An Update". Eighteenth-Century Music. 15 (2). Cambridge University Press: 207–229). doi:10.1017/S1478570618000052. S2CID 165216708.

== See also ==
- Music conservatories of Naples
- Robert Gjerdingen
