= Carl Ewald =

Danish writer (1856–1908)

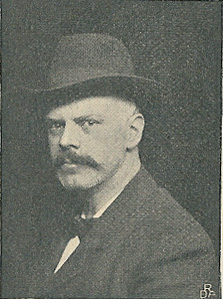
- Ewald c. 1902
- Born: 15 October 1856 Bredelykke by Gram, Duchy of Schleswig, Denmark
- Died: 23 February 1908 (aged 51) Charlottenlund, Denmark
- Resting place: Gentofte, Denmark
- Years active: 1882–1908

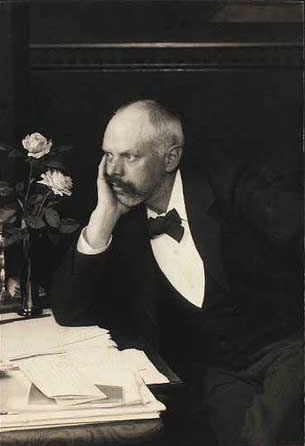
Ewald, photographed by Frederik Riise.

Carl Ewald ([ˈe̝ːˌvælˀ], 15 October 1856 – 23 February 1908) was a Danish novelist and satirist, known for his fairy tales.

== Biography ==
Carl Ewald was born on 15 October 1856 in Bredelykke by Gram in the Duchy of Schleswig, then a part of Denmark. He was named after his grandfather of the same name and he had twelve siblings. His father, H. F. Ewald was an author. He was educated at the University of Copenhagen, where his family had moved to after the Duchy of Schleswig fell to Prussia in 1864. From 1880 to 1883, he was a school director in Copenhagen. His first literary work was published in 1882. After spending a few years as a forester, he turned to literature in 1887, issuing school texts and translations.

In 1893, he had a son, Jesper Ewald, with Betty Ponsaing. In 1894, due to an extramarital relationship he had with Agnes Henningsen, Ewald's second son Poul was born. The relationship ended in a divorce.

Ewald died in Charlottenlund (near Copenhagen) on 23 February 1908, aged 51. He was buried in Gentofte.

== Works ==
- Singleton's Udenlandsrejse (1894)
- Glaede over Danmark (1898)
- Sulasmiths Have (1898)
- Der Kinderkreuzzug (The Children's Crusade, 1896)
- Mein Kleiner Junge (My little boy, 1899)
- Crumlin (1900)

Several of his works have been translated into English.

- The Pond and Other Stories, tr. Alexander Teixeira de Mattos, ill. Harry B. Neilson (London: Everett & Co., 1909)
- The Queen Bee, and other nature stories, tr. by George Charles Moore-Smith (Thomas Nelson & Sons, 1907) and illustrated by Margaret Thompson
