= Ewald Fabian =

German dentist (1885–1944)

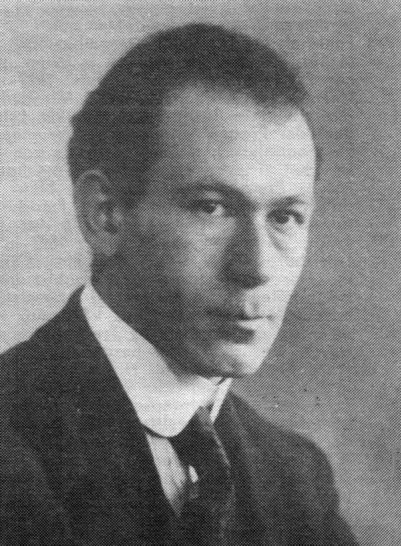
Dr Ewald Fabian

Dr Ewald Fabian (4 November 1885, in Berlin – 17 February 1944, in New York City) was a German dentist who worked in Berlin in the 1930s. He was the editor of Der Sozialistische Arzt (The Socialist Doctor), organiser of Verbandes sozialistischer Aerzte in Deutschland and the Secretary of the International Socialist Medical Association.

== Biography ==
Originally a member of the Democratic Union, Fabian became a member of the Social Democratic Party in 1912.

In 1914, when war broke out, he was arrested by an Italian ship in Marseille as an enemy alien with military service while on a Mediterranean voyage. Until 1918, he was interned as a civilian prisoner in Carcassonne and Ajaccio and was then exchanged for illness in Switzerland. There he joined the anti-war movement. In 1919, he returned to Berlin, where he became a member of Spartacists, the USPD and the KPD. In 1926, he was expelled from the KPD. Later he joined the KPD-O. On November 23, 1931, he resigned as a founding member of the SAP at. From 1925 to 1933, he was secretary of the Association of Socialist Doctors and editor of the journal The Socialist Doctor.

After the Nazi seizure of power, Fabian was listed as an enemy of the state and arrested. He was set free with a bail from his sister and moved to Prague. With the Germany invasion of Czechoslovakia, Fabian fled to Paris, and eventually New York, where he lived until his death in 1944.

== Works and legacy ==
He is credited by Charles Brook with inspiring the formation of the Socialist Medical Association (later the Socialist Health Association) which played a prominent part in establishing the British National Health Service. He corresponded with and eventually met Dr. Brook in 1930. Brook explains that Fabian was a man of heavy build and when he got in his fragile car, which was contemptuously referred to by his friends as “The Dung Cart,” the front passenger seat collapsed. The SMA later helped him by securing his release from a French internment camp at the beginning of the Second World War.
