= Evald Nielsen =

Danish silversmith

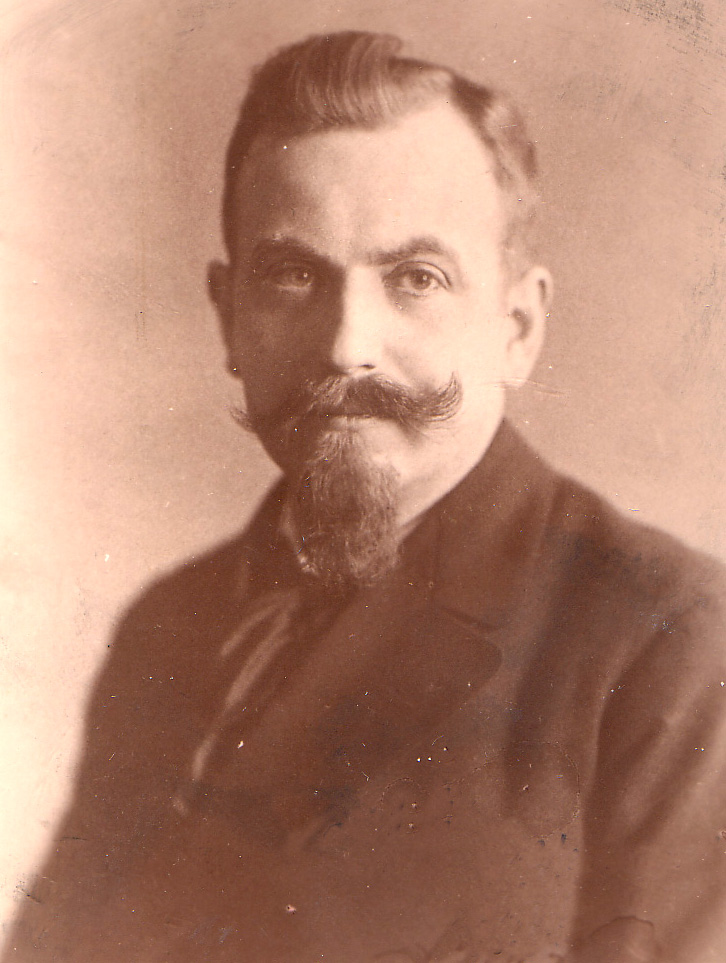
Evald Nielsen in 1918 when he had been elected master of The Goldsmith's Guild of Copenhagen

Evald Nielsen (June 5, 1879 in Stubbekøbing, Denmark – May 12, 1958 in Copenhagen) was a Danish silversmith and long-standing master of the Goldsmith's Guild of Copenhagen and one of the leading men behind the organizing of the Danish gold- and silversmiths.

== Life and career ==
Nielsen was born in Stubbekøbing on the island Falster in the southeast of Denmark. In 1887 his father, a coach builder, smashed his knee in a working accident and went bankrupt with his workshop. When the father died in 1893, the family was left in poverty.

In 1893 Evald Nielsen was apprenticed to the workshop of Aug. Fleron in Copenhagen, first as a press operator, later as steel engraver. In 1900, when he had finished his training, he travelled and worked in Germany, Switzerland and France, and he visited the World Exhibition in Paris 1900.

In 1905 Evald Nielsen opened his own shop and workshop in a cellar in Raadhusstræde, Copenhagen. At first he worked as silversmith as well as engraver, but after a few years he concentrated on silver producing and selling hollow ware, jewelry and first of all cutlery. In 1914 his workshop employed 14 persons.

In 1918 his shop and workshop moved to Vester Voldgade 11 in Copenhagen, where the firm had its base for the following decade.

In 1926 Evald Nielsen bought a property at Nygade 5 - a street which is part of the main shopping area in Copenhagen, and moved his shop to this building. In 1931 the shop was renovated and rebuild in the art deco style, attracting much attention among the Copenhageners of that time. In 1930 the workshop was moved from Vester Voldgade to rented premises in Ny Vestergade 7 some hundred meters east of Nygade.

From 1927 and a decade onwards Evald Nielsen's oldest son, the silversmith Aage Weimar (1902–1986) worked in the firm, until he opened his own workshop.

Evald Nielsen's other son, Bjarne Weimar (1906–1988), finished his education as a chaser in 1929 and started working in his father's firm. In 1941 he was taken into partnership, and he tried to carry on with the firm, when Evald Nielsen died in 1958. His attempt wasn't successful, and the shop in Nygade closed in the spring of 1970.

The workshop in Ny Vestergade was in 1958 let on lease to Ejnar Olsen, who produced to the shop in Nygade. In 1967 the workshop was sold to Helge Hansen. The following year he moved the activities to Rødovre (a suburb west of Copenhagen), where he already had a workshop. Up to 2006 the firm was carried on in the name of Evald Nielsens Eftf. (Evald Nielsen's successor), the last years with Helge Hansen's sons Harly Hansen and Søren Pedersen as owners. In 2006 they sold the firm and the rights to the Evald Nielsen-name and -design to silversmith Gregers Holt; today he is running Evald Nielsens Eftf. from premises in Stenløse northwest of Copenhagen.

== Design ==
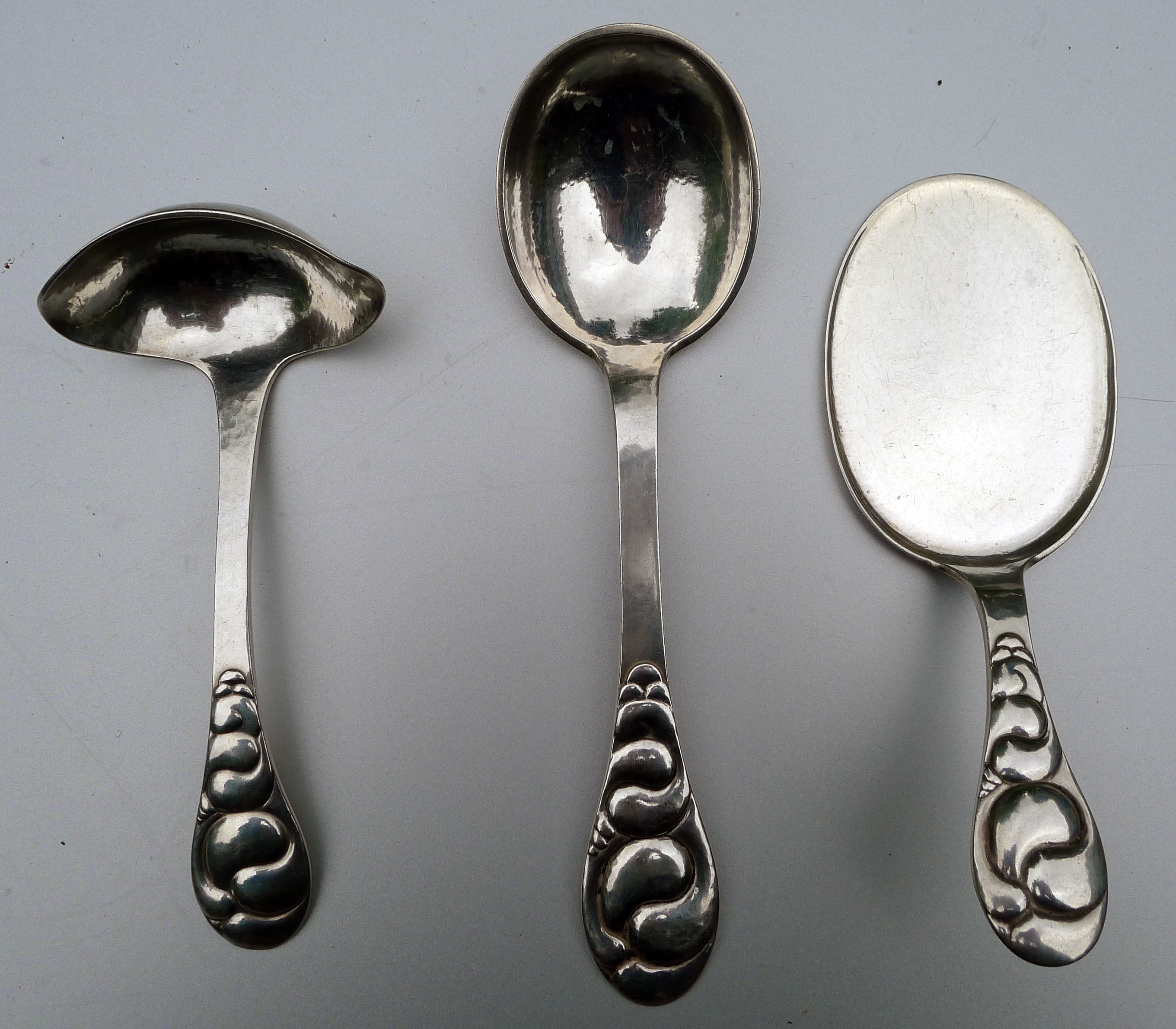
Silversmith Evald Nielsen - anno 1924 No 4

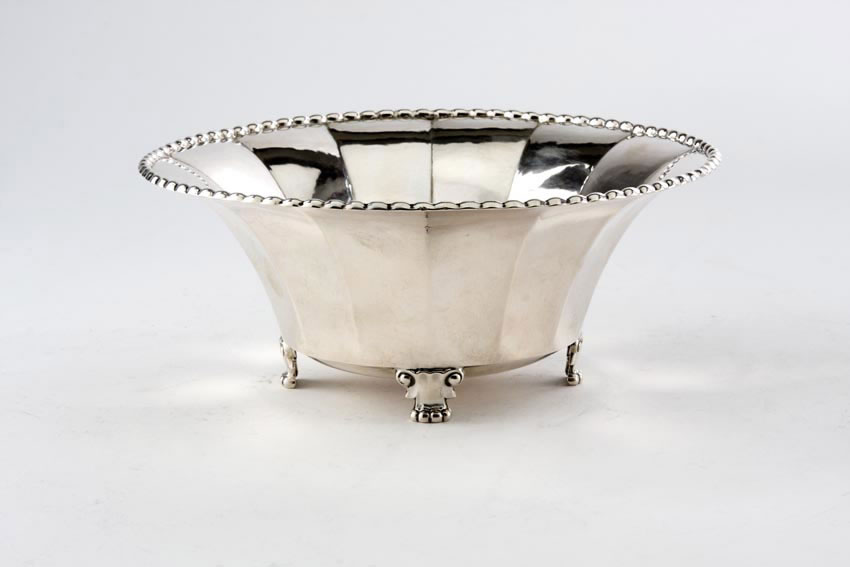
Silversmith Evald Nielsen - anno 1924 No 4

Evald Nielsen opened his workshop the year after the well known Georg Jensen started as silversmith. In the years to come Evald Nielsen put his mark on the Danish skønvirke-style (jugend).

Contrary to Georg Jensen Evald Nielsen based his firm on his own design and only to a small extent used artists and architects as designers.

During the first decades he himself designed jewellery, hollow ware and cutlery. He generated his own style, among other things characterized by the so-called drawn out or stretched mountings holding the stones of the jewellery.

In the 1930s his son Aage Weimar was attached to the firm, he worked with design, and he took part in bringing Evald Nielsen into the art deco style with its tighter use of form.

Evald Nielsen sold his silver not only in Denmark; he had many customers in Germany, and from the 1930s and forward Americans were frequent customers. Today his works are highly appreciated by collectors in the two countries.

Throughout his whole life Evald Nielsen was characterized by his wholehearted holding on to skilful craftsmanship and excellent quality. To him the fully trained craftsman was the one and only to design and create. "The professional skill and knowledge of the trade has always been essential in preserving the confidence between the goldsmith and the customers," he in January 1935 wrote in Guldsmede-Bladet (trade paper for the Danish gold- and silversmiths).

Because of that he worked hard to organize the training of the employees at the workshops, and among other things he in 1918 took part in planning and teaching at the first courses for gold- and silversmiths at the Danish Technological Institute.

== Organizing work ==
In 1913 Evald Nielsen became a member of the Goldsmith's Guild of Copenhagen. In 1918 he was elected master of the guild. From then on he engaged himself in organizing work, building up an organization that could represent the Danish gold- and silversmiths in negotiations with the rapidly growing labor unions that defended the rights of the employees.

The most important step was the formation of Dansk Guldsmedemesterforening (the Union of Danish Goldsmithmasters) in 1920 with Evald Nielsen as the first chairman. From here he was engaged in a number of organizations, and among other things he for many years was a member of the executive committee of The Confederation of Danish Employers.

During the 1940s Evald Nielsen cut down on the organizing work. He resigned the chairmanship of Dansk Guldsmedemesterforening in 1946, shortly after his silver jubilee. In 1948 - after 30 years - he retired from the mastership of the Goldsmith's Guild of Copenhagen and was at that occasion made honorary master.

Through his contribution Evald Nielsen to a high degree formed the basis of the organization of the Danish gold- and silversmiths that is prevailing today.

== Hallmarks ==
Silver from the workshop of Evald Nielsen is marked with "EN" or his full name: "Evald Nielsen".

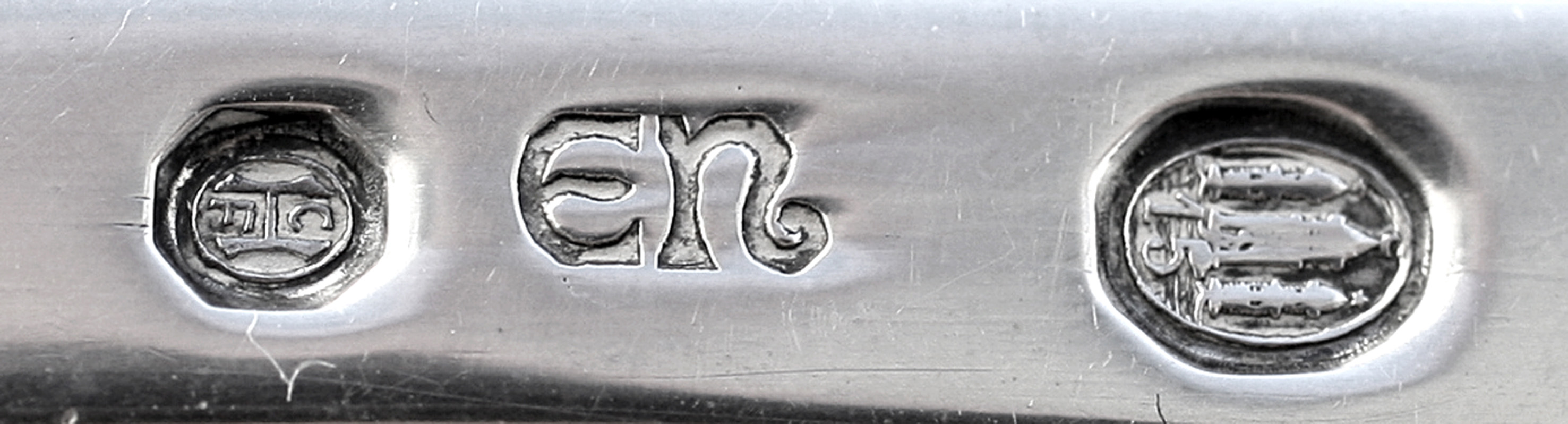
Hallmark of Evald Nielsen. To the right the three towers, the Danish mark for the genuineness of the silver. To the left the mark of the assayer Christian Fr. Heise, assyer 1904-1932

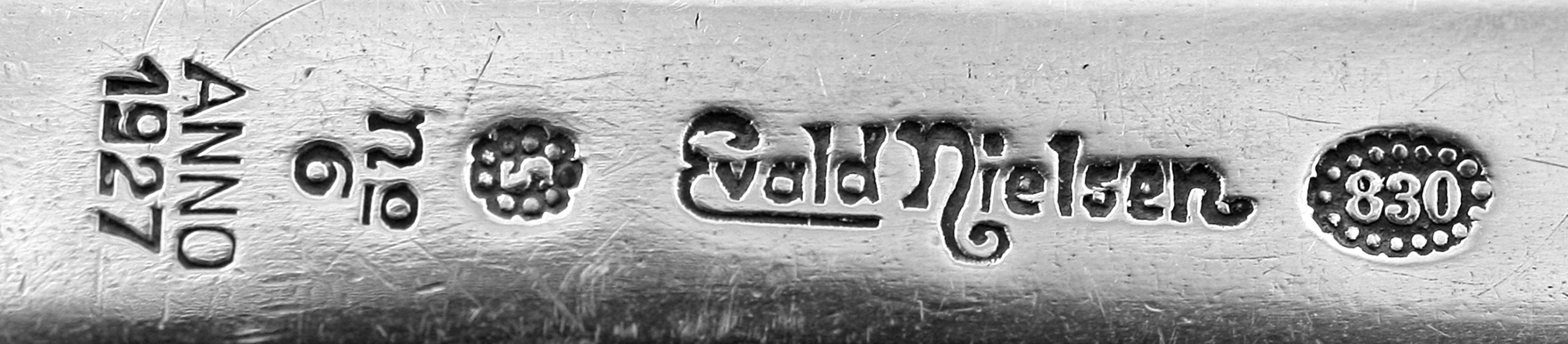
Hallmark of Evald Nielsen. To the left marks which can often be found on his cutlery: the number of the design and the year of production. To the right "830", telling the purity of the silver: 830/1000.
