= Ewald Frie =

German historian (born 1962)

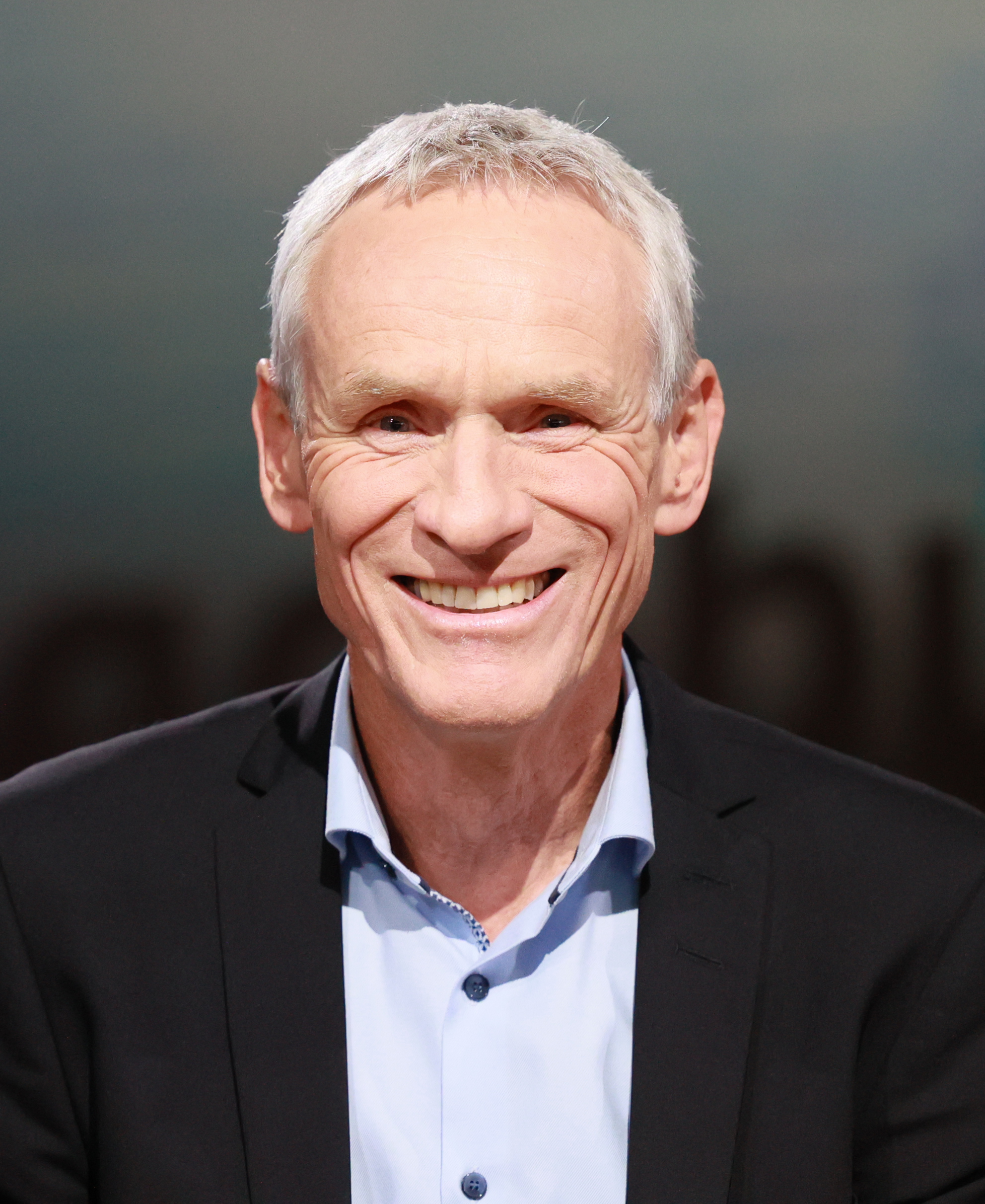
- Frie (2023)
- Born: 10 October 1962 (age 63); Nottuln, Münster, Germany
- Education: University of Münster
- Scientific career
- Fields: Modern history
- Workplaces: University of Duisburg-Essen, University of Trier, University of Tübingen
- Thesis: (1992)
- Doctoral advisor: Hans-Ulrich Thamer
- Website: www.uni-tuebingen.de/en/4386

Ewald Frie (born 10 October 1962) is a German historian and biographer at the University of Tübingen. His research interests include German history of the 18th, 19th and 20th centuries, European nobility, poverty and the welfare state, and Australian history.

== Early life ==
Frie was born on 10 October 1962 to a farmer and his wife two kilometres from the village of Nottuln in the Münster region of Germany. He is the third youngest of 11 children.

== Career and education ==
Frie studied modern history, medieval history, and Catholic theology at the University of Münster. He worked as an academic trainee at the Institute for Westphalian Regional History in Münster between 1989 and 1991 before earning his PhD in 1992. He was an assistant professor at the Science Center North Rhine-Westphalia in Düsseldorf 1993-1995, then in the University of Duisburg-Essen's modern history faculty (1995-2007). He finished his second doctorate in 2001. He joined University of Trier in 2007 before accepting a position as a full professor of modern history at the University of Tübingen.

Between July 2011 and August 2016, Frie was a spokesperson for the Collaborative Research Center 923, a research institute at the University of Tübingen that focuses on threatened social orders. He is a member of the Prussian Historical Commission, the Working Group for Prussian History, the Lamprecht-Gesellschaft in Leipzig, the Working Group for Non-European History, and the board of the Sigurd-Greven-Stiftung in Cologne. He is the university liaison for the Friedrich-Ebert-Stiftung and has been a review editor for H-SOZ-KULT. He has also been involved with the University of Tübingen's journals Bedrohte Ordnungen, Adelswelten, and Contubernium. Tübinger Beiträge zur Universitäts- und Wissenschaftsgeschichte.

== Selected publications ==
- Revolution, Krieg und die Geburt von Staat und Nation. Staatsbildung in Europa und den Amerikas 1770–1930. (= Bedrohte Ordnungen. Bd. 3). Mohr Siebeck, Tübingen 2016, ISBN 978-3-16-153597-0.
- Aufruhr – Katastrophe – Konkurrenz – Zerfall. Bedrohte Ordnungen als Thema der Kulturwissenschaften. Mohr Siebeck, Tübingen 2014, ISBN 978-3-16-152757-9.
- Friedrich II. Rowohlt, Reinbek 2012, ISBN 978-3-499-50720-5.
- Das Deutsche Kaiserreich. Wissenschaftliche Buchgesellschaft, Darmstadt 2004, ISBN 3-534-14725-1.
- Friedrich August Ludwig von der Marwitz: 1777–1837. Biographien eines Preußen. Schöningh, Paderborn 2001, ISBN 3-506-72730-3.
- Caritativer Katholizismus in Deutschland im 19. und 20. Jahrhundert: Literatur zur Erforschung seiner Geschichte aus den Jahren 1960 bis 1993. Lambertus, Freiburg im Breisgau 1994, ISBN 3-7841-0728-1.
- Wohlfahrtsstaat und Provinz: Fürsorgepolitik des Provinzialverbandes Westfalen und des Landes Sachsen 1880–1930. Schöningh, Paderborn 1993, ISBN 3-506-79580-5.
