= Ewald Bonzet =

South African runner (1951–2016)

Personal information
- Nationality: South African
- Born: George Groenewald Bonzet; 25 December 1951 Caledon, South Africa
- Died: 7 September 2016 (aged 64) Bellville, South Africa
- Education: Cape Technikon, Epping High School
- Occupation: Health inspector
- Spouse: Rene

Sport
- Sport: Track and Road running
- Club: Bellville Athletics club

George Groenewald (Ewald) Bonzet (25 December 1951 – 7 September 2016) was a South African Track and Road runner. At his time he was the National record holder in various distances.

== Early days ==
Bonzet was born in Caledon, Western Cape South Africa. His father was a Train Station Master. He attend Epping High School (today known as Goodwood College) He qualified as a Health Inspector at Cape Technikon Later the Technikon merged and became the Cape Peninsula University of Technology. He is married to Rene and have one child. He was a Steam Train Enthusiast.

== Running career ==
Bonzet ran in the colours of Bellville Athletics club

Personal bests
Distance	Time (Men)	Year
1500m	3m37,3s	1975
1 mile	3m57,3s	1977
3000m	7m49,6s	1976
3000m steeple chase	8m31,6	1975
5000m	13m30,4s	1978
10000m	28m16,2s	1974
10 km Road	29m15s	1983
15 km Road	49m22s	1994
21,1 km Road	1h2m54s	1982
42,2 km Road	2h12m8s	1983

South Africa National record
Distance	Time (Men)	Year
2000m	5m2,8s	1977
3000m	7m53,12s	1974
3000m	7m51,8s	1975
3000m	7m49,6s	1976
3000m steeple chase	8m37,6	1974
3000m steeple chase	8m31,6s	1975
2 miles	8m30,8s	1975
5000m	13m31,2s	1974
5000m	13m30,4s	1978
10000m	28m51,6s	1972
10000m	28m16,2s	1974

== Award ==
In 1982 he received the Reggie Walker medal. This medal was presented by Athletics South Africa for excellent performances through the years.
