= Ewald Wurzinger =

Austrian journalist (born 1987)

Ewald Simon Wurzinger (born 12 February 1987 in Graz, Styria) is an Austrian journalist for Radio Vienna at the national public broadcaster ORF and a newspaper columnist for the Kleine Zeitung. He is also known for raising a memorial on Diana, Princess of Wales.

== Life ==
Wurzinger grew up in Styria on the farm estate of his parents and studied Media science in Graz. Since 2007 he has been working for the public broadcaster ORF as a local radio and TV reporter. On Radio Wien he does any news and society reports as well as talk shows. He is also working as a news correspondent for the Italian Rai based in Vienna and London. In 2013 he raised the first monument dedicated to Diana, Princess of Wales in a German-speaking country in a park in Vienna. Former friends of the late princess have visited Wurzinger's tribute. In 2014 the memorial was presented at Kensington Palace. The white bust and the memorial plaque were created by the sculptor Wolfgang Karnutsch.

Diana's close friend Rosa Monckton has supported the memorial project. In 2017 Wurzinger was chosen to become a godfather to Monckton's daughter Domenica, who had been the last godchild of the late princess.

On his farm estate, Wurzinger developed a rent-a-cow-program for bridging a divide between the city and the farmers in 2015.

== Awards ==
IFAJ Alltech Young Leaders Award, 2015, New Zealand.
