= Jesper Ewald =

Danish writer (1893–1969)

Jesper Ewald (24 December 1893 in Vordingborg – 30 August 1969 in Copenhagen) was a Danish author, journalist and translator. He was the son of Carl Ewald and half-brother to Poul Henningsen.

Beside the books he wrote under his own name, Jesper Ewald wrote many children's books under different pseudonyms. He also translated works by Honoré de Balzac and Rudyard Kipling.

== Bibliography ==
- The provident Dane's trip in Paris (Den sparsommelige Danskers Pariserfærd) (1921)
- The little (Den lille) (1926)
- The young one (Ungen) (1939)
- Fairytales in Selection (Eventyr i Udvalg) (1941)
- The twins: A beautiful birthday (Tvillingerne: en dejlig Fødselsdag) (1941)
- Hansen & Son (Hansen & Søn) (1942)
- The War of Proxima (Krigen over Proxima) (1943)
- S. Seidelin: 1843 - 10th of October 1943: A brief history of a Danish tradinghouse: History through 100 years. (S. Seidelin : 1843 - 10. Oktober - 1943 : Træk af et Dansk Handelshus' Historie gennem hundrede Aar) (1943)
- Gråpeter (1943)
- Lundquist and Elvira and other stories (Lundquist og Elvira og andre historier) (1944)
- The Green Years (De grønne år) (1945)
- On a hunt in Copenhagen (Paa Jagt i København) (1945)
- The bright night (Den lyse nat) (1947)
- The rich years (De rige år) (1947)
- An ugly boy (En grim Dreng) (1947)
- Poetic Works: 1912-1948 (Poetiske Skrifter : 1912-1948) (1948)
- Travel in France (Frankrigsrejse) (1948)
- Poetic Works (Poetiske skrifter) (1948)
- Europe is my home (Europa er mit hjem) (1949)
- The little paradise and other experiences between Skagen and Rome (Det lille paradis og andre oplevelser mellem Skagen og Rom) (1950)
- Travel in Spain (Spaniensrejse) (1952)
- Letters from a childhood (Breve fra en barndom) (1953)
- Niels Hansen: A biography (Niels Hansen : et portræt) (1953)
- Danish fairytales (Danske folkeeventyr) (1954)
- Strømkæntring (1954)
- A fight with life (I kamp med livet) (1954)
- Treklang (1960)
- Stories (Historier) (1961)
- He turns the hourglass (Han vender timeglasset) (1963)
- Jesper Næsvis and other Danish fairytales (Jesper Næsvis og andre danske folkeeventyr) (1964)
- Miseri Mø and other Danish fairytales (Miseri Mø og andre danske folkeeventyr) (1965)
- A naǐve traveller in France, Italy and Spain (En troskyldig rejsende i Frankrig, Italien og Spanien) (1965)
