= Ernst Julius Richard Ewald =

German physiologist (1855–1921)

Ernst Julius Richard Ewald (14 February 1855 – 22 July 1921) was a German physiologist born in Berlin. He was a younger brother to gastroenterologist Carl Anton Ewald (1845–1915).

In 1880, after finishing his studies in mathematics, physics and medicine, he became an assistant to physiologist Friedrich Goltz (1834-1902) at the University of Strasbourg. In 1900, he succeeded Goltz as chair of physiology at Strasbourg, a position he maintained until 1918.

Ewald is best remembered for his research of the vestibular system of the inner ear, which largely involved experiments performed on the semicircular canal system of pigeons. From these studies the so-called "Ewald laws" are derived, which deal with the effects of endolymph motion on body, head and eye movements and also on the phenomena of excitation-inhibition asymmetries in the vestibular system.

- Ewald's first law: "The axis of nystagmus parallels the anatomic axis of the semicircular canal that generated it".
- Ewald's second law: "Ampullopetal endolymphatic flow produces a stronger response than ampullofugal flow in the horizontal canal".
- Ewald's third law: "Ampullofugal flow produces a stronger response than ampullpetal flow in the vertical canals (anterior and posterior semicircular canals).

In 1892, he was given an award by the Paris Academy of Sciences for his monograph "Physiologische Untersuchungen über das Endorgan des Nervus octavus".

== Selected writings ==
- Physiologische Untersuchungen über das Endorgan des Nervus octavus (1892).
- Ist die Lunge luftdicht? (with Rudolf Kobert).
- Zur Physiologie des Labyrinths (1895) – physiology of the labyrinth.
- Die Physiologie des Kehlkopfs (1896) – physiology of the larynx.
- Eine neue Hörtheorie (1899) – new theory of hearing.
- Schallbildertheorie und Erkenntnistheorie, Z. Sinnesphysiol. 53, 213-217. (1914) – theory of sound patterns and epistemology.
