= Evald Tordik =

Estonian singer

Evald Tordik (26 September 1923 Saru Parish, Võru County – 5 January 1989 Tartu) was an Estonian opera singer (bass).

In 1949 he graduated from Estonian State Theatre Institute and in 1957 Tallinn State Conservatory.

From 1953 until 1987, he was a soloist at Estonian Radio's mixed choir and from 1957 until 1989, at Vanemuine Theatre.

Awards:

- 1967: II place in Estonian singers competition

== Operatic roles ==
- Mehis (E. Kapp's "Tasuleegid, 1956 in Estonia Theatre)
- hermit (Weber's "Nõidkütt", 1957)
- Vaho (Aav's "Vikerlased", 1958)
