= Ewald Kienle =

German inventor and entrepreneur (1928–2021)

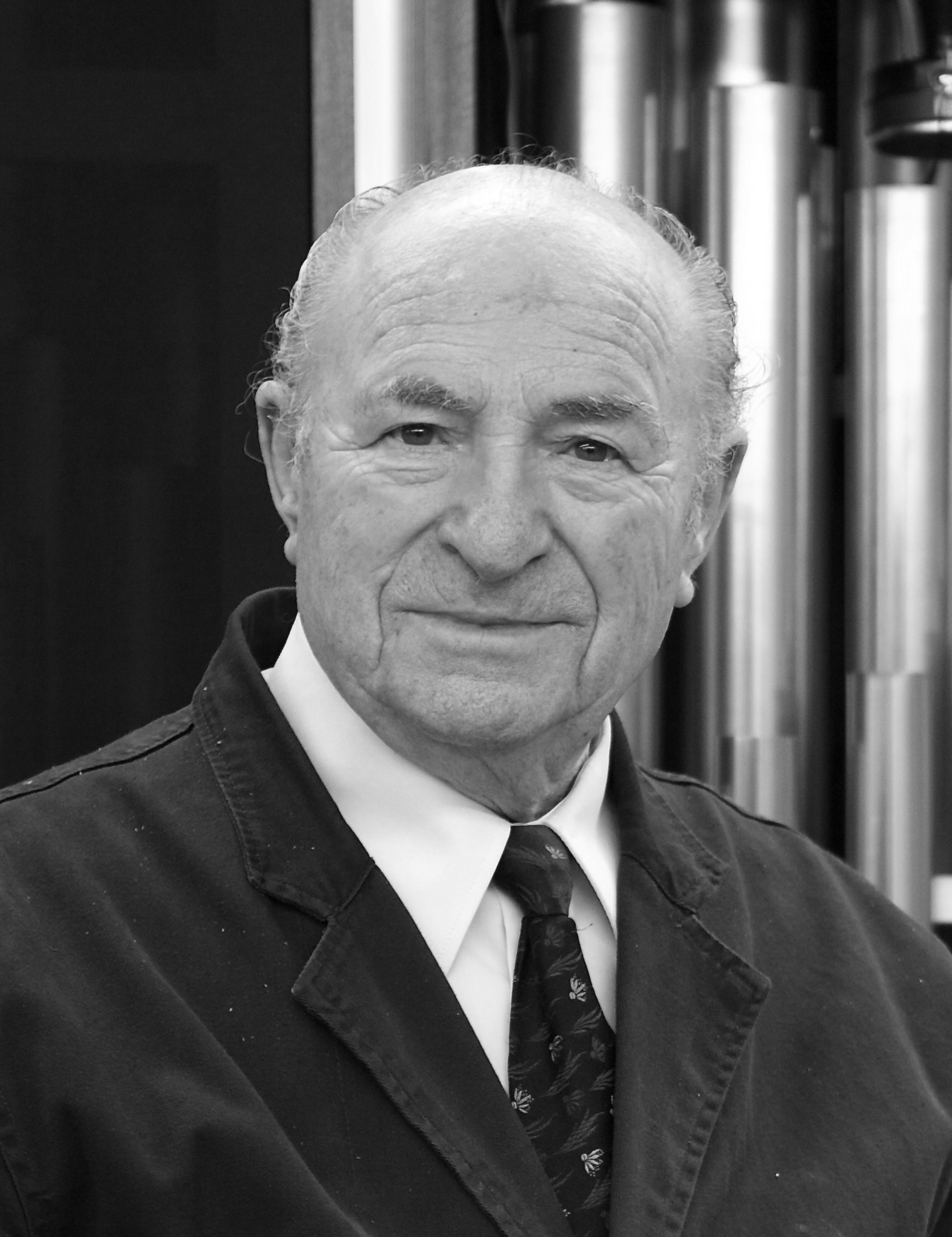
Kienle in 2008

Ewald Kienle (21 December 1928 – 1 February 2021) was a German inventor and entrepreneur. He developed and produced electronic church organs.

== Early life and work ==
Born in Nußdorf nearby Ludwigsburg (today a part of Eberdingen), Kienle is the son of a village blacksmith and the village blacksmith's Sicilian wife. At the age of 15, he was summoned from school to go work for the aircraft manufacturer Messerschmitt, learning aircraft construction. After World War II in 1945, he concentrated on improving and repairing radio and the first television sets. Eventually, he began to develop his own church organs.

=== Organ innovations ===
By 1970, Kienle was producing his own analogue church organs (the Kienle T-Model). They were so well constructed that even the Physikalisch-Technische Bundesanstalt (Federal Institute of Physics and Technology) validated it had a lively sound. Simultaneously, Kienle started to experiment with resonator tubes to improve the sound quality of the loudspeaker. In 1980, he installed the first analogue church organ with resonators in St. Rochus Catholic Church in Bonn-Duisdorf.

From 1980 onwards, Kienle developed digital church organs. In Europe, the first digital church organ (Model Kienle PK II), was installed in the European Parliament in Strasbourg in 1985 and was inaugurated with a Bach concert.

By 1990, Kienle had started research on the use of original organ pipes without core as resonators (pipe resonators) which he installed, partly with additional resonator tubes, in the Kienle Resonator System for all kinds of digital organs.

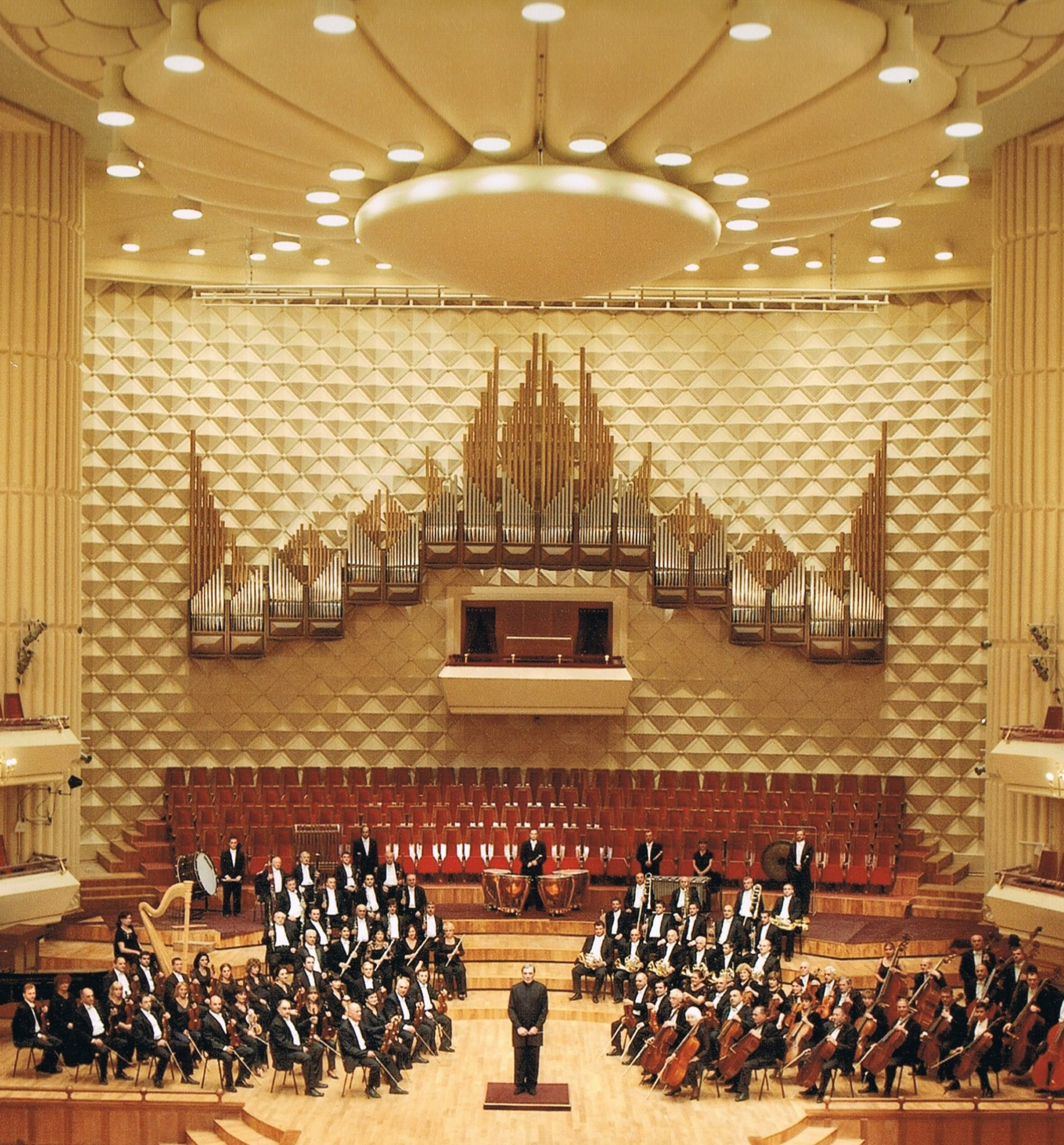
Kienle-Organ in the Centre for Music and Culture in Georgia

Kienle held several patents as of 1970, the earliest ones in the field of analogue organs. His later inventions allowed the technically complex airflow stimulation of organ pipes to be replaced by simpler loudspeaker sound stimulation with more frequencies at the same time. In addition to the sound innovations, this reduced manufacturing costs to about one-third of the costs of a traditionally built pipe organ. With the elimination of the high maintenance costs for pipe organs, which are prone to temperature and humidity fluctuations, smaller parishes were able to purchase and maintain an organ.

During an approximately 50-year period, Kienle installed more than 3,000 organs worldwide: in Europe, South Africa, Peru, and Russia. In 2010, the largest organ with the Kienle Resonator System was installed in the concert hall of the newly built Tbilisi Centre in Tbilisi, Georgia.

Due to old age, Kienle closed down his retail company, Ewald Kienle e.K., in 2011. His life's work is continued by the newly founded KIENLE® Orgeln GmbH.
