= Andrew Ewald =

American cell biologist

- Education: Haverford College (1997) California Institute of Technology (2003) University of California, San Francisco (2008)
- Occupation: Professor of cell biology at Johns Hopkins University
- Known for: Metastatic breast cancer research

Andrew Ewald is a professor of cell biology at Johns Hopkins University School of Medicine. He is known for his contributions in the field of metastatic breast cancer research.

== Education ==
Ewald earned a BS in physics from Haverford College in 1997. He then went on to complete a PhD in 2003 from the California Institute of Technology in biochemistry and molecular biophysics. He researched in Scott Fraser's Lab where he studied light microscopy which would later influence his research.

For his postdoctoral work completed in 2008, Ewald studied in Zena Werb's lab at the University of California, San Francisco focusing on epithelial biology and breast cancer.

== Career ==
Ewald initially joined the Johns Hopkins University faculty as an assistant professor of cell biology in 2008. He was promoted in 2014 to associate professor where he taught until 2018. In March 2021, Ewald was appointed the Director of the Department of Cell Biology at Johns Hopkins School of Medicine.

Ewald was an editor for the Journal of Cell Science. In 2013, he became a Breast Cancer Research Foundation investigator.

Ewald serves as a founder and co-director of the Cancer Invasion and Metastasis Research Program at the Sidney Kimmel Comprehensive Cancer Center.

Ewald is a member of the American Association for Cancer Research, American Society for Cell Biology, and the Society for Developmental Biology.

== Research ==
Ewald's research focus is primarily on breast cancer cells and their movement throughout the body. His aim is to determine which various cell types enable or disable the spread of metastatic breast cancer. His lab utilizes novel cell culturing and imaging techniques to study metastasis in real-time.

His lab is known for having discovered the molecular program by which breast cancer cells metastasize and that breast cancer cells metastasize in groups.

Some of Ewald's research is focused on the cancer cell microenvironment and how it communicates with other cells. His research aims to isolate this microenvironment to test different variables and see how they influence growth. He is also interested in the effects of the extracellular matrix on preventing invasion. He uses 3D gels that imitate the behavior of the collagen matrix in the human body to test its interaction with cancer cells.

Ewald developed an innovative light microscopy method to study cell-to-cell movement that he calls 4-D Confocal Microscopy. This new methodology utilizes imaging techniques to identify cellular mechanisms that allows for the differentiation and spread of cancer cells. Using mouse models, he developed assays to determine which cell types were more prone to migration away from the primary tumor. His research identified the lead migratory cancer cell to be K14+ across several models for breast cancer. K14 is a type of epithelial cell, which lines organs and tumors, which Ewald believes may be a major component necessary for cancer cells to metastasize.

Ewald was invited to speak at the Nobel Foundation Conference on Cancer Metastasis in Stockholm, Sweden in 2018.

== Awards and honors ==
- American Association of Anatomists Morphological Sciences Award (2011)
- American Cancer Society's Research Scholar Award (2012)
- Johns Hopkins University Provost's Catalyst Award (2016)
- Johns Hopkins University Provost's Discovery Award (2016)
- JHU Daniel Nathans Scientific Innovator Award (2020)
