= University of NorthWest =

US distance learning university

Coordinates: 40.70290°N 73.99041°W

The University of NorthWest is a degree mill based in the United States.

Originally established in 2001 in New York City, the University provides distance education courses that lead to academic degrees in several fields. Its website states that it offers classes at 'learning centers' in Canada, China, Bangladesh, Ireland, India, Kenya, Lebanon, Malaysia, Nepal, Nigeria, Pakistan, Russia, Singapore, Sri Lanka, Taiwan, Thailand and the United Kingdom. In the summer of 2010, the Oregon Office of Degree Authorization reported that the University of NorthWest was actively engaged in Afghanistan.

== Accreditation status ==
NorthWest's promotional materials state that it is incorporated in the United States, but that it is "not accredited by an accreditation agency approved by the US Department of Education" Allen Ezell's 2007 book Accreditation Mills discusses the institution as an example of a "degree mill". It is listed as an unaccredited institution by the education agencies in Oregon and Maine. It is illegal to use its degrees in Texas. The website lists the institutions that it is accredited by.

In 2009, it was listed as registered with the American Association of Collegiate Registrars and Admissions Officers.
