= Ewald Meltzer =

German physician (1869–1940)

Ewald Meltzer (11 August 1869 in Auerbach, Vogtland – 30 January 1940 in Herrnhut, Oberlausitz) was a German director of an asylum in Saxony whose work was used by the Nazis to justify their Aktion T4 euthanasia program.

== Life ==
Conrad Ewald Meltzer was born in 1869 in Auerbach, Vogtland, to Ernst Meltzer (1833–1896) and Marie Martha Beyer. Meltzer had six siblings. A younger brother, Hermann Meltzer, became a teacher and educator, while a sister, Marie, married the priest and educator Karl Ernst Thrändorf.

Many members of Meltzer's family held positions in fields which involved civic duty, education and personal piety, which is thought to have played an integral part in Meltzer's life and his views on life.

Meltzer's father held the position of superintendent and pastor in Auerbach for the Evangelical-Lutheran church. Meltzer's paternal grandfather, Carl Gottlieb Traugott Melzer, had been a preacher and poet laurate of Wittenberg university, while an uncle, Karl Meltzer, was the mayor of Frankenberg. Meltzer's maternal grandfather Ewald Beyer was a priest and theologian.

== Education ==
Meltzer was enrolled at the Furstenschule St. Afra in Meissen.

He studied medicine at Leipzig, Würzburg, and received his doctorate at 1894 from the University of Jena on his dissertation Dynamometrische untersuchungen bei Geisteskranken.

== Career ==
After graduation, Meltzer was an assistant physician in the sanatorium in Grobhennersdorf Katarinehof between 1901 and 1905. He then took a position at Altendorf-Chemnitz and subsequently became the head at the Zuchthaus Waldheim (English: house of corrections) in Löbau, where Meltzer worked with the criminally insane.

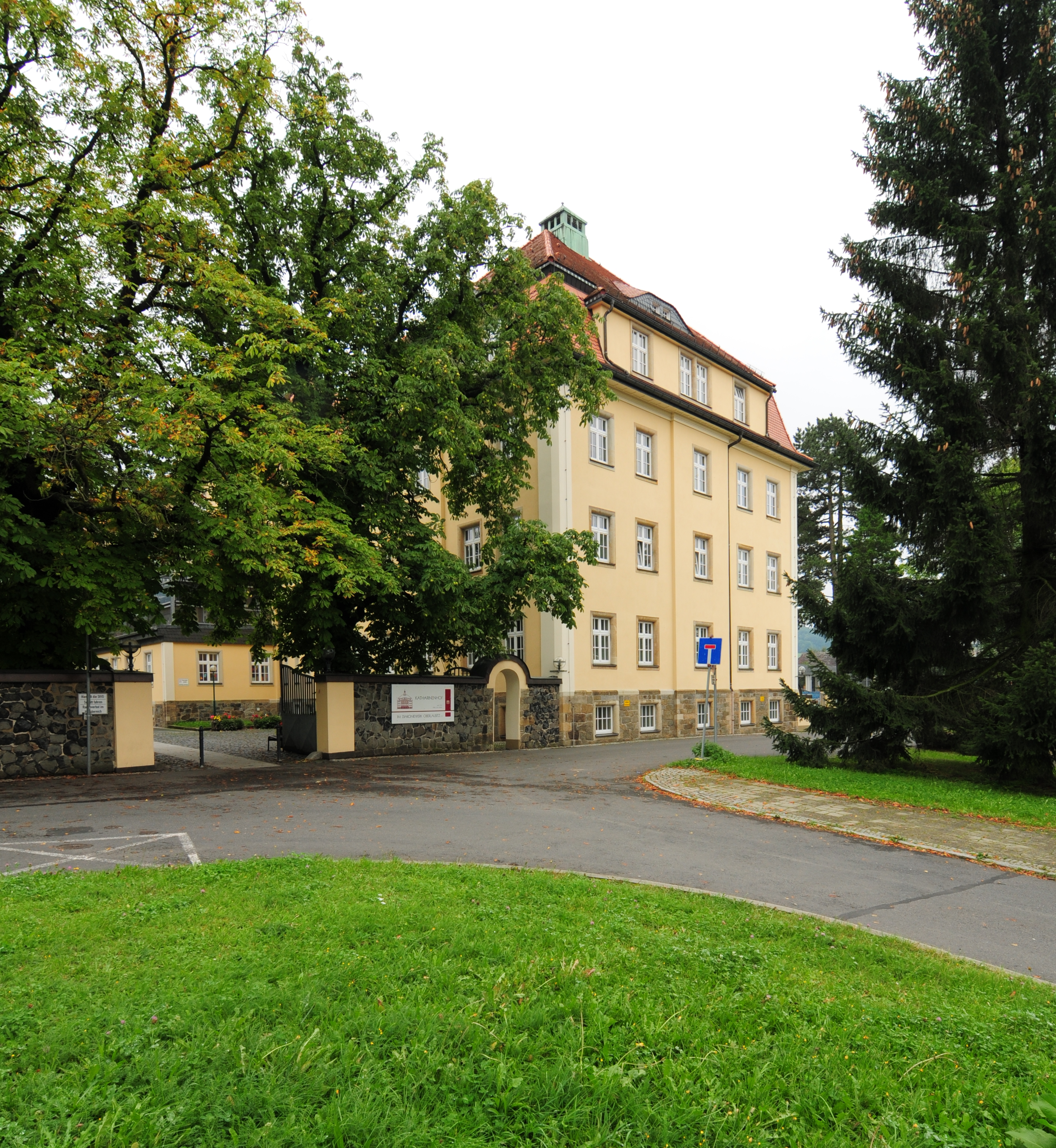
Katharinenhof Grobhennersdorf

Meltzer was also a physician for several other institutions, such as the mental asylums in Untergöltsch, Colditz, and "Landestanstalt fur blinde un zwachsinnige" in Chemnitz. The staff at Grobhennersdorf in particular were loyal and devoted to Meltzer, as he gave them a fair wage and saw that they were given ample food. This care of his staff led to the institution having a very small turnover rate, compared with other similar institutions in Germany.

After the Nazi Party gained power in 1934, the ownership and direction of Grobhennersdorf was given over to the religious welfare organization Inner Mission (German: Innere Mission), an organization that was tied closely to Nazi ideologies. The effect was soon noticed, and Inner Mission staff soon began replacing the nurses and orderlies who worked at Grobhennersdorf.

When the law of compulsory sterilization was put into action, many of Grobhennersdorfs patients were subject to it, and in many cases this resulted in death. Meltzer himself was not against sterilisation as a treatment method, but he disapproved of the way that the government was implementing it indiscriminately.

Meltzer officially retired as a director for Grobhennersdorf in 1937, but continued as unofficial director for two years until 1938.

"I know further that in Saxon euthanasia was practiced upon children in Grosshennersdorf by Löbau. I know for certain from relatives in my parish who lost children in this program that the parents' agreement to the killing of children in the euthanasia program was not obtained. The director of the institution where the killings were carried out, Dr. Meltzer, told me that parents were not informed. Because Meltzer opposed the killing of the children, the institute, which was the property of the church's Inner Mission [its charitable arm], was confiscated and placed under state supervision, and Meltzer was retired."

— Affidavit by clergyman Richard Schaefer-Wienecke concerning the euthanasia program, Nüremberg documents, NO 3817

=== Thesis ===
Meltzer was a vocal critic of Alfred Hoche and Karl Binding, whose polemic about "life unworthy of living", Die Freigabe der Vernichtung Lebensunwerten Lebens, sparked a controversy about euthanasia for people with disabilities.

According to Burleigh, Meltzer hotly disputed the claim that people with mental handicaps had lost the last vestiges of human personality, stressing instead their capacity and will to enjoy life. In Das Problem der Abkürzung "lebensunwerten" Lebens (1925), Meltzer wrote that it was "far more heroic to accept these beings to the best of one's abilities, to bring sunshine into their lives, and therewith to serve humanity." He claimed asylums for handicapped people were not only valuable centres of scientific research, but also tangible manifestations of Christian charity.

Meltzer was a deeply religious man who was strongly committed to the Evangelical Lutheran faith. It was his strong personal belief that the position taken by Hoche and Binding, that the care of mentally disabled people was a waste of resources and energy, was wrong. Meltzer's reply was that it was no less a waste of energy than able-bodied people's waste of energy in reading filthy literature and pursuing immoral pleasures.

According to Mostert, "In an attempt to support his belief, Meltzer surveyed the parents of his patients to ascertain their perceptions of disability and euthanasia." To Meltzer's astonishment, the survey results showed a widely held contradiction among the parents, that although they had strong emotional ties to their children, they simultaneously expressed, with varying degrees of qualification, a "positive" attitude toward killing them. In fact, only a handful of respondents completely rejected all notions of euthanasia". Meltzer also noted that many of the parents cited personal and economic reasons for their pro-euthanasia stance.

Meltzer attempted to publish his findings in several psychological journals, but found them rejected by readers as pure fabrication and too outlandish to believe.

However, this was one of many such documents which was brought to the attention to Hitler by his personal physician Theodor Morell and included in his memorandum "Extermination of Worthless Life". The form of the survey would be used in a way Meltzer had not intended, rather than as a hypothetical situation; it was subverted by Hitler and the Nazi government to show a clear consensus among the German population for the euthanasia of the country's disabled population, and that such an action would not any substantial resistance from the families of the victims. Meltzer's survey has been cited as a major rationale for the killing of thousands of people with disabilities in Nazi Germany.

== Personal life ==
Meltzer married Meta Melanie Warneck in 1899, and the couple had a daughter, Eleonore (b. 1900)

== Death ==
Meltzer died on 30 January 1940 in Herrnhut, due to complications of an operation.
