= Carl Anton Ewald =

German gastroenterologist (1845–1915)

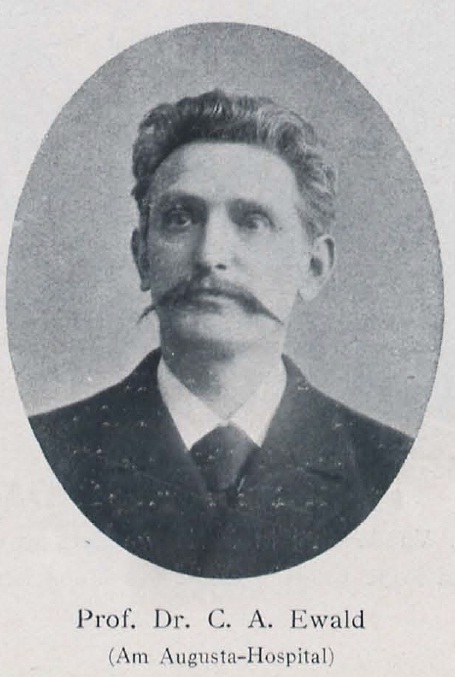
Carl Anton Ewald

Carl Anton Ewald (30 October 1845 – 20 September 1915) was a German gastroenterologist who was a native of Berlin. He was the brother of physiologist Ernst Julius Richard Ewald (1855–1921).

In 1870, he earned his medical doctorate in Berlin, and subsequently became an assistant to pathologist Friedrich Theodor von Frerichs (1819–1885). In 1888, he was appointed head physician of the department of internal medicine at Augusta Hospital in Berlin.

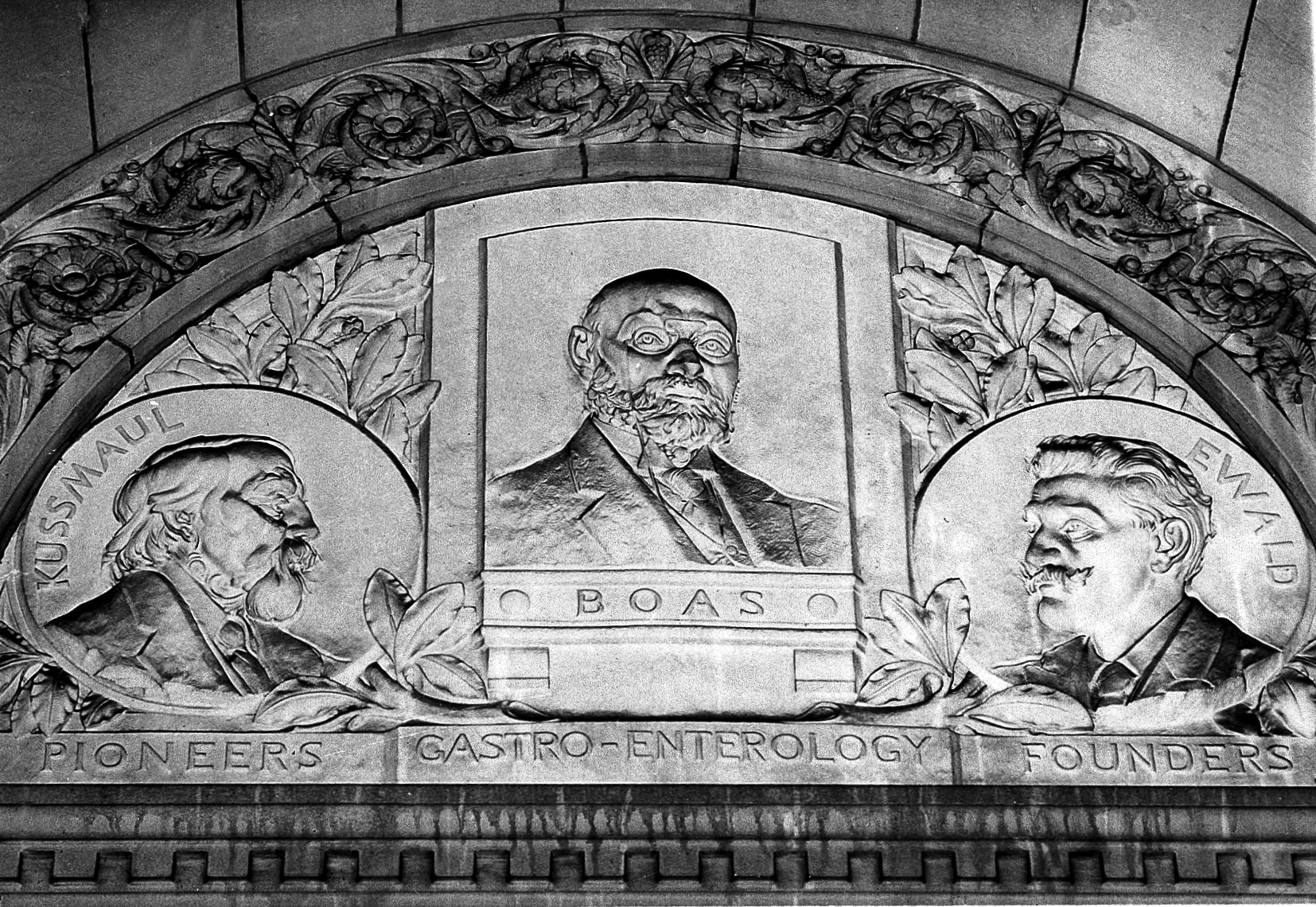
Lunette over entrance porch of theatre, Lennox Hill Hospital, New York; Portrait plaques of Adolf Kussmaul, Ismar Isidor Boas and Carl Anton Ewald.

Carl Ewald was a pioneer in the field of gastroenterology, and was a catalyst in making Augusta Hospital a center for pathological studies of digestion. Ewald is remembered for investigations of gastric secretions, and the introduction of intubation as a medical aid in gastric analysis. The eponymous "Ewald tube" is named after him, a device that serves as a gastric tube for emptying the contents of the stomach.

With Ismar Isidor Boas (1858–1938), he developed a standard "test meal" for gastric analysis. This involved a process in which various foods were given to a patient, and followed by analysis of gastric juices at scheduled intervals.

Among his published works are "The Diseases of the Stomach" and "Lectures on Digestion", two books that have been translated into English. For many years he was editor of the Berlin klinische Wochenschrift. He also served as librarian to the Berlin Medical Society.

== Works ==
- Handbuch der allgemeinen und speciellen Arzneiverordnungslehre : auf Grundlage des Arzneibuchs für das Deutsche Reich . Hirschwald, Berlin 12. Aufl. 1892 Digital edition by the University and State Library Düsseldorf
